= Timeline of Belgian history =

This is a timeline of Belgian history, including important legal and territorial changes and political events in Belgium and its predecessor states. To read about the background to these events, see History of Belgium. See also the list of Belgian monarchs.

== 1st century BC ==
Year	Date	Event
57 BC		Roman General Julius Caesar invades and conquers the lands of the Belgae: Battle of the Sabis; Siege of the Atuatuci
56 BC		Julius Caesar campaigns unsuccessfully against the coastal tribes of the Morini and Menapii.
55 BC		Julius Caesar subdues the Morini.
54–53 BC		Ambiorix's revolt under Ambiorix and Cativolcus.
53–51 BC		Punitive campaigns subdue Nervii and Treveri; exterminate Eburoni.
50 BC		Julius Caesar completes writing Commentarii de Bello Gallico, his account of his campaigns in Gaul.
29 BC		Marcus Nonius Gallus suppresses revolt among Treveri.
27 BC		Augustus creates the province Gallia Belgica.
ca. 15 BC		Probable origins of the city of Tongeren.
12 BC		Augusta Treverorum becomes a city.
12 BC		Nero Claudius Drusus, commander in chief of Roman forces in Gallia Belgica, has a series of canals dug in the Rhine–Meuse–Scheldt delta.
ca. 10 BC		Probable origins of the city of Aarlen.
9 BC		Nero Claudius Drusus dies after falling from his horse. Command of Rome's northern armies passes to Tiberius.
4 BC		Monument honouring Tiberius erected in Bagacum.

== 1st century ==
Year	Date	Event
13		Germanicus becomes commander of the Roman army of the Rhine.
16		Roman invasion of Germany under command of Germanicus launched from Fectio in Gallia Belgica.
19	10 October	Death of Germanicus.
21		Treveri revolt at high taxes.
39	October	Galba becomes commander of the armies in Lower Germany.
47		Gnaeus Domitius Corbulo becomes commander of the armies in Lower Germany. Orders canals dug in the Rhine–Meuse–Scheldt delta.
47–48		Roman law replaces customary law in Gallia Belgica; druids outlawed; Gaulish aristocracy given senatorial rank.
69	January	Armies of the Rhine proclaim Aulus Vitellius as emperor.
	July	Batavian Revolt begins.
70		Treveri, Menapii, Nervii and Tungrii come out in support of the Batavian Revolt, some under compulsion.
77		Pliny the Elder starts writing his Historia Naturalis, book 4 of which contains a description of Gallia Belgica.
ca. 85		Northern border fortified with series of castra.
ca. 90		Domitian restructures provinces of the Roman Empire: Gallia Belgica divided into the provinces of Belgica Prima, Belgica Secunda, Germania Superior and Germania Inferior.

== 2nd century ==
Year	Date	Event
172–174		Chauci launch maritime raids on the coasts of Gallia Belgica.

== 3rd century ==
Year	Date	Event
286		Carausius, a Menapian general in the Roman army, declares himself emperor of Britain and Gaul.
293		Death of Carausius, brings the end of the Carausian revolt 3 years later.

== 4th century ==
Year	Date	Event
343		Servatius, bishop of Tongeren, attends the Council of Serdica.
357		Land south of the Rhine delta ceded to Frankish foederati
359		Servatius, bishop of Tongeren, attends the Council of Ariminum.

== 5th century ==
Year	Date	Event
431		Salian Franks take possession of Tournai.
c. 481		Childeric I buried in Tournai.

== 6th century ==
Year	Date	Event
561		Sigebert I inherits the Frankish kingdom of Austrasia.

== 7th century ==
Year	Date	Event
659	17 March	Death of Gertrude of Nivelles
679		Death of Amandus.
679	23 December	Murder of Dagobert II in the Ardennes Forest.
687		Pepin of Herstal and his wife Plectrude found what will become the Abbey of Saint-Hubert.
693	17 December	Death of Begga.

== 8th century ==
Year	Date	Event
705	17 September	Death of Lambert of Maastricht: murdered at a site that would become Liège.
717		See of Maastricht moved to the location of Lambert of Maastricht's murder, now Liège.
727	30 May	Death of Hubertus, Bishop of Liège.
748	2 April	Birth of Charlemagne, first Holy Roman Emperor.

== 9th century ==
Year	Date	Event
819	13 April	Louis the Pious confirms the liberties granted to St Bavo's Abbey by Charlemagne (oldest extant original charter in a Belgian archive).
820		First recorded Viking raid on the Flemish coast.
825	30 September	The remains of St Hubert (died 727) installed in the monastery that would become the Abbey of Saint-Hubert.
843	August	Treaty of Verdun divides the Carolingian Empire between the three sons of Louis the Pious: Lothair I, Louis the German and Charles the Bald, creating the kingdom of Middle Francia (including most of the Low Countries) for Lothair and assigning Flanders to Charles the Bald.
850		Norsemen raid Flanders.
855	September	Treaty of Prüm divides Middle Francia into the Kingdom of Lotharingia (including most of the Low Countries), the Kingdom of Provence and the Kingdom of Italy.
861		Norsemen raid Flanders.
864		Norsemen raid Flanders.
870	August	Treaty of Meerssen partitions Lotharingia (including most of the Low Countries) between East Francia (Germany) and West Francia (France).
879		Norsemen raid Taxandria.
880		Norsemen raid Tournaisis.
881		Norsemen plunder Cambrai and encamp near Maastricht, extorting tribute from Maastricht, Tongeren, Liège, Sint-Truiden, Malmedy, Stavelot, and Prüm.
891	September or October	Norse invaders defeated in Battle on the Dijle.
895		Holy Roman Emperor Arnulf of Carinthia appoints his illegitimate son Zwentibold as king of Lotharingia.
900	13 August	Zwentibold slain by Count Reginar I of Hainault; Lotharingia reincorporated into East Francia.

== 10th century ==
Year	Date	Event
908		Bishop of Liège granted right to levy a toll in Maastricht.
910		Count Reginar I of Hainault appointed margrave of Lotharingia; historically regarded as the first Duke of Lorraine.
915		Death of Reginar, Duke of Lorraine, at his palace in Meerssen; succeeded by his son Giselbert.
918	10 September	Death of Baldwin II, Margrave of Flanders at Blandijnberg; succeeded by his son Arnulf.
925		Henry the Fowler invades Lotharingia and receives oaths of loyalty from the local aristocracy.
936	7 August	Gilbert, Duke of Lorraine, attends the coronation of Otto I in Aachen.
939	2 October	Battle of Andernach: death of Gilbert, Duke of Lorraine; end of independence of Lotharingia (referred to as "Belgica" in the 10th-century histories of Richer of Rheims).
around 940		Saint-Ghislain Abbey reformed by Gérard of Brogne
948		Death of Isaac, Count of Cambrai; powers of count transferred to Fulbert, Bishop of Cambrai.
953		Bruno the Great, Archbishop of Cologne, appointed Duke of Lotharingia.
954		Hungarian attackers raid Lower Lotharingia, besiege Cambrai.
959		Bruno the Great divides Lotharingia into Upper Lotharingia (the later Duchy of Lorraine) and Lower Lotharingia (the later Duchy of Lothier).
959	3 October	Death of Gérard of Brogne.
964		Godfrey I, Duke of Lower Lorraine, dies in Italy; no immediate successor.
965	28 March	Death of Arnulf I, Count of Flanders; succession of Arnulf II, Count of Flanders
965	2 June	Otto I, Holy Roman Emperor, confirms Godfrey of Lower Lotharingia's gift to Saint-Ghislain Abbey of 18 mansi of land in Villers-Saint-Ghislain.
965	11 October	Death of Bruno the Great, Duke of Lotharingia.
966	5 May	Lothar, King of the Franks, confirms the possessions of St. Peter's Abbey, Ghent, including those bequeathed by Arnulf I, Count of Flanders, and contested by his heirs.
968		Richar, Count of Mons, appointed Duke of Lower Lotharingia.
972	October	Richar, Duke of Lower Lotharingia, dies; no immediate successor.
977		Otto II, Holy Roman Emperor, appoints Charles, brother of Lothair of France, as Duke of Lower Lotharingia.
980		Otto II, Holy Roman Emperor, confirms all previous endowments to Notker, Bishop of Liège, and issues a general immunity for the bishopric's lands: beginning of the establishment of the Prince-Bishopric of Liège.
985		Otto III, King of Germany, endows Notker, Bishop of Liège, with the County of Huy: full establishment of the Prince-Bishopric of Liège.
987	30 March	Death of Arnulf II, Count of Flanders; succession of Baldwin IV, Count of Flanders.
990		Death of Hildegard of Flanders, daughter of Arnulf II, Count of Flanders, and wife of Dirk II, Count of Holland.

== 11th century ==
Year	Date	Event
1008	April	Baldrick II succeeds Notger as prince-bishop of Liège
1018	29 July	Battle of Vlaardingen: imperial forces commanded by Godfrey II, Duke of Lower Lorraine, and Baldrick II, bishop of Liège, defeated by the army of Dirk III, Count of Holland. Baldrick died after a sudden illness on the journey; Godfrey was captured in the battle.
1018	November	Wolbodo consecrated bishop of Liège.
1021		Durandus succeeds Wolbodo as prince-bishop of Liège
1025		Reginard succeeds Durandus as prince-bishop of Liège
1035	30 May	Death of Baldwin IV, Count of Flanders; succession of Baldwin V, Count of Flanders
1037		Nithard succeeds Reginard as prince-bishop of Liège
1042		Wazo succeeds Nithard as prince-bishop of Liège
1047		Baldwin V, Count of Flanders, seizes control of the imperial castle at Ename
1048		Theodwin succeeds Wazo as prince-bishop of Liège
1049	13 January	Forces of Theodwin of Liège defeat forces of Dirk IV, Count of Holland, killing Dirk and restoring imperial authority in the Rhine delta.
1060		Baldwin V, Count of Flanders, becomes regent of France
1063		Ename Abbey founded
1066		Theodwin of Liège grants city rights to Huy, the oldest such charter to survive from what is now Belgium.
1067	1 September	Death of Baldwin V, Count of Flanders; succession of Baldwin VI, Count of Flanders
1067		Genealogia comitum Flandrensium compiled.
1070	17 July	Death of Baldwin VI, Count of Flanders; succession of Arnulf III, Count of Flanders
1071	22 February	Battle of Cassel between Robert the Frisian and his nephew, Arnulf III, Count of Flanders. Arnulf was killed in the battle and Robert succeeded him as count.
1074	29 April	Pope Gregory VII issues bull of protection for the Abbey of Saint-Hubert.
1075	23 March	Pope Gregory VII writes to Theodwin, bishop of Liège, urging him to leave the abbot of Saint-Hubert unmolested.
1075	23 June	Death of Theodwin of Liège.
1077	28 April	Pope Gregory VII issues bull of protection for Watten Abbey.
1080		Adela of Flanders marries Canute IV of Denmark
1081	1 February	Traditional date of the first apparition of Our Lady of Tongre.
1086		Adela of Flanders, queen consort of Denmark, returns to the Low Countries after her husband's murder
1087		Godfrey of Bouillon becomes Duke of Lower Lorraine
1093	13 October	Death of Robert I, Count of Flanders; succession of Robert II, Count of Flanders
1096	August	Godfrey of Bouillon, Duke of Lower Lorraine, sets off as one of the leaders of the First Crusade.
1100	18 July	Death of Godfrey of Bouillon

== 12th century ==
Year	Date	Event
1105		Baldric of Noyon, Bishop of Tournai, awards the right of presentment for Tielt to the chapter of St Salvator in Harelbeke.
1105		St Michael's church, Hekelgem becomes a dependency of Affligem Abbey.
1106	13 May	Godfrey I, Count of Louvain, invested as Duke of Lower Lotharingia in Worms Cathedral.
1107		The hermit Ligerius founds a community that would become Ten Duinen Abbey (the Abbey of Dunes).
1111	5 October	Death of Robert II, Count of Flanders; succession of Baldwin VII, Count of Flanders
1119	17 July	Death of Baldwin VII, Count of Flanders; succession of Charles I, Count of Flanders (Charles the Good)
1125		Godfrey I, Count of Louvain confirms the agreement of Ava of Waver and her sons with the priory of Forest, transferring ownership of an allod in Woluwe.
1127	2 March	Murder of Charles the Good, Count of Flanders
	30 March	William Clito claims countship of Flanders
1128	1 January	Albero I of Louvain, prince-bishop of Liège, dies; succeeded by Alexander of Jülich
	28 July	William Clito dies while laying siege to Aalst; Thierry of Alsace established his claim to the countship of Flanders
1129		Foundation of Park Abbey.
1139	25 January	Godfrey I, Count of Louvain, dies; succeeded by Godfrey II
1141	17 August to 22 September	Siege of Bouillon Castle by Albero, prince-bishop of Liège.
1142	13 June	Godfrey II, Count of Louvain dies; succeeded by Godfrey III
1146	24 June	Pope Eugene III confirms Wibald, Abbot of Stavelot and Malmedy, in possession of the goods of the abbey.
1147	after 11 May	Henry II of Leez, Bishop of Liège, confirms Affligem Abbey in possession of its property in the diocese of Liège.
		Arnout IV, Count of Aarschot, and Christian of Ghistelles, leaders of forces from the Low Countries on the Second Crusade, are diverted to the Siege of Lisbon
1159	1 October	Godfrey III, Count of Louvain, takes Grimbergen
1163	June	Henry the Blind, Count of Namur and of Luxembourg, being childless, names his sister Alice of Namur with her husband Baldwin IV, Count of Hainaut, and their son Baldwin, as heirs of all his allodial possessions, "with sod and twig", retaining usufruct during his own lifetime.
1164	4 September	Henry II of Leez, prince-bishop of Liège, dies
1167		Rudolf of Zähringen becomes prince-bishop of Liège
1168	17 January	Death of Thierry, Count of Flanders; succession of Philip of Alsace as count of Flanders
		Godfrey, Duke of Lower Lotharingia, confirms the privileges of the borough of Tienen (oldest extant civic charter from the Duchy of Brabant)
1171	8 November	Baldwin IV, Count of Hainaut, dies; succeeded by Baldwin V
1178		Gislebert of Mons becomes chancellor to Baldwin V, Count of Hainaut.
1183		Godfrey III, Count of Louvain, departs for Jerusalem
1184	1 April	Henry the Blind, Count of Namur and of Luxembourg, being childless, names his nephew, Baldwin V, Count of Hainaut, already heir to all his allodial possessions, as heir equally to all his feudal possessions, "with sod and twig", retaining usufruct during his own lifetime.
1185	28 to 29 April	Saint Lambert's Cathedral, Liège, destroyed by fire.
1186	July	birth of Ermesinde, later countess of Luxembourg, only child of Henry the Blind. As a female heir she would inherit his allodial possessions, but not his feudal possessions.
1190	21 August	Godfrey III, Count of Louvain dies; succeeded by Henry I, Duke of Brabant
1191	1 August	Death of Philip of Alsace, Count of Flanders; succession of his daughter Margaret I, Countess of Flanders, and her husband and co-ruler Baldwin V, Count of Hainaut
	5 August	Rudolf of Zähringen, prince-bishop of Liège, dies
	8 September	Albert of Louvain elected prince-bishop of Liège
1192	24 November	Murder of Albert of Louvain, prince-bishop of Liège, by supporters of Emperor Henry VI
1193	19 May	Relics of Saint Alena enshrined in Forest Priory.
1194	20 August	Peace treaty between Henry I, Duke of Brabant and Baldwin V, Count of Hainaut, ending twelve years of conflict between the Duchy of Brabant and the County of Hainaut.
	15 November	Death of Margaret I, Countess of Flanders; her husband Baldwin V, Count of Hainaut continues to rule as Baldwin VIII of Flanders
1195	17 December	Death of Baldwin V, Count of Hainaut; succession of his son Baldwin VI as count of Flanders and Hainaut
1197		Henry I, Duke of Brabant, departs for Jerusalem.
1198		Baldwin VI, Count of Hainaut, donates all his possessions in the village of Horrues to the collegiate church of Soignies to endow a Lady chapel and a chantry.

== 13th century ==
Year	Date	Event
1205	14 April	Battle of Adrianople: Baldwin I of Constantinople, count of Flanders and Hainaut, captured by the Bulgarians
1213	22 April	Henry I, Duke of Brabant, marries Marie of France in Soissons.
	30 to 31 May	Battle of Damme: English fleet destroys French fleet at anchor near Damme.
	13 October	Battle of Steppes: army and allies of Hugh Pierrepont, Bishop of Liège, defeat the forces of Henry I, Duke of Brabant.
1214	27 July	Battle of Bouvines: decisive French victory against the forces of Ferdinand, Count of Flanders, Henry I, Duke of Brabant, and Otto IV, Holy Roman Emperor. Count of Flanders carried captive to Paris.
1224	12 August	Guy of Saint-Pol and his brother, Hugo of Saint-Pol, stand surety for a loan of 3693 pounds borrowed from citizens of Arras by Daniel, Lord of Béthune: an early example of the use of French rather than Latin in legal documents.
1229	10 June	Henry I, Duke of Brabant, issues charter of city rights for Brussels.
1232	20 September	Ferdinand, Count of Flanders and Joan, Countess of Flanders release inhabitants of the Brugse Vrije from the feudal relief of "best beast".
1235	5 September	Henry I, Duke of Brabant, died; succeeded by Henry II
1236		Statutes of the Ghent Leper Hospital translated from Latin: the earliest known example of a legal document entirely in Dutch.
1237		Charters of the city of Ghent translated into Dutch.
1238		Benedictine priory at Vorst, a dependency of Affligem Abbey, becomes the independent Forest Abbey.
1245	14 June	Pope Innocent IV authorizes the canons regular of St Augustine to establish a grammar school in Leuven.
1248	1 February	Henry II, Duke of Brabant, died; succeeded by Henry III
1255		Gothic choir of Tournai Cathedral completed
1261	28 February	Henry III, Duke of Brabant, dies; succeeded by Henry IV
1270	1 September	Margaret of Constantinople, Countess of Flanders, impounds wares of English merchants in Flanders in retaliation for their king's non-payment of a money fief, sparking a trade war between Flanders and England.
1272	after 29 April	Henry IV, Duke of Brabant, died; succeeded by John I
1274	28 July	Treaty of Montreuil-sur-Mer between Edward I of England and Guy, Count of Flanders, ending four years of economic warfare and providing for free movement of merchants between their territories.
1275	27 September	Future John II, Duke of Brabant, born.
1281	21 August	Guy de Thourout does homage to Guy, Count of Flanders for lands in Wervik, Reninge and Rollegem. He also held land in Menen and Rekkem, a manor in Varsenare, and owned a number of houses within the city of Ypres.
	24 August	John of Enghien, prince-bishop of Liège, dies of wounds sustained during an abduction attempt.
1288	5 June	Battle of Worringen
1293	7 May	Aldermen of Nieuwpoort accept the mediation of Guy, Count of Flanders in their dispute with the abbeys of Duinen and Bourbourg concerning a dyke built near the town.
1294	3 May	John I, Duke of Brabant, died; succeeded by John II
1295	16 August	John II, Duke of Brabant, recognises that Affligem Abbey by immemorial custom has the right to appoint a panel of seven aldermen for the village of Hekelgem.
1296	2 November	Edward I of England grants Flemish merchants the right to buy wool for export anywhere in the British Isles, rather than being limited to the wool staple.
1297	12 June	Treaties of alliance between Philip IV of France and John of Avesnes, Count of Hainaut, culminate in a trade treaty allowing merchants from Hainaut to trade freely in the kingdom of France.
	5 November	Guy, Count of Flanders and Marquis of Namur transfers government of Namur to John of Namur, his eldest son by Isabelle of Luxembourg, breaking the personal union of Namur with the County of Flanders (which would pass to Robert, Guy's son by Matilda of Béthune).

== 14th century ==
Year	Date	Event
1302	11 July	Battle of the Golden Spurs: Flemish forces defeat knights of Philip IV of France near Kortrijk
1303	9 July	Aldermen of the city of Namur authorize formation of a butchers' guild with militia obligations, requiring members to arm themselves, follow their own banner, and bury their own dead.
1312	27 September	The Charter of Kortenberg finalised at Kortenberg Abbey, establishing fundamental rights for the inhabitants of the Duchy of Brabant such as no punishment without due process. Council of four knights and ten representatives of the boroughs established (beginnings of representative institutions in the duchy).
	27 October	John II, Duke of Brabant, dies; succeeded by John III
1313	24 August	Henry of Luxembourg died in Buonconvento while besieging Siena, reputedly of poison put in the chalice during mass.
1317	11 April	Works begins on a new cloth hall in Leuven, which is now University Hall.
1322	24 June	Joanna of Brabant born.
1323	June	Rebellion of the commoners in maritime Flanders, sparked by Louis I, Count of Flanders, ceding Sluis to John I, Marquis of Namur.
1327	30 August	Pope John XXII provides a dispensation for the marriage of Philippa of Hainault and Edward III of England. The marriage itself took place by proxy in Valenciennes in October.
1328	24 January	Marriage of Philippa of Hainault and Edward III of England celebrated in York Minster.
1328	23 August	Battle of Cassel: Philip VI of France defeats Flemish rebels led by Nicolaas Zannekin.
1339	3 December	Treaty of mutual support between John III, Duke of Brabant and Louis I, Count of Flanders, and the cities subject to them, providing for offensive and defensive alliance and free trade between their territories.
1340	24 June	Battle of Sluys
1345	24 July	Jacob van Artevelde killed in Ghent.
1355	8 March	The boroughs of the Duchy of Brabant and the Duchy of Limburg undertake to remain united under a single prince after the death of John III, Duke of Brabant, not allowing the territory to be divided among his heirs.
	5 December	John III, Duke of Brabant, died; succeeded by Joanna
1356	3 January	Joyous Entry of 1356: Joanna, Duchess of Brabant and her husband Wenceslaus I of Luxembourg sign the great charter of liberties of the Duchy of Brabant.
1370		Extirpation of small Jewish population of Brabant after accusations of profaning eucharistic hosts.
1379		Ghent Revolt led by Philip van Artevelde begins
1382	3 May	Battle of Beverhoutsveld – men of Ghent take Bruges and gain control over most of the county of Flanders
	27 November	Men of Ghent defeated in Battle of Roosebeke; Philip van Artevelde slain
1383	25 May	Battle of Dunkirk
	8 June to 8 August	Siege of Ypres
1384	30 January	Louis II, Count of Flanders, last count of the House of Dampierre, dies; succeeded by his daughter Margaret III, Countess of Flanders, whose husband Philip the Bold ruled on her behalf: beginning of period of Burgundian rule in the Low Countries
1385	18 December	Peace of Tournai ends the Ghent Revolt
1386	15 February	Philip the Bold founds the Lille Chamber of Accounts to audit the accounts of his functionaries in the county of Flanders.
1387	2 November	Oldest record of the incorporation of the Brussels guild of painters, goldbeaters and glassmakers.
1389		John of Bavaria elected Prince-Bishop of Liège (resigned 1418).
1390	28 September	Joanna, Duchess of Brabant secretly relinquishes possession of the Duchy of Brabant to her niece, Margaret of Male, and offspring thereof.
1392	1 November	John of Bavaria, bishop-elect of Liège, writes to Philip the Bold to intercede for merchants from Liège arrested by the officers of Rethel.

== 15th century ==
Year	Date	Event
1408	9 September	John the Fearless takes fiscal measures to pay Alexander Stewart, Earl of Mar's archers joining him on the Liège campaign. (Letter bearing only known surviving signature of John the Fearless).
	28 September	Battle of Othée: forces of John the Fearless and John of Bavaria defeat Liège rebels.
1411		Suppression of the Homines Intelligentiae in Brussels.
1421	23 April	Philip the Good transfers usufruct of the County of Namur to John of Flanders, Lord of Béthune, for the duration of his life.
1425	9 December	Pope Martin V issues papal bull founding University of Leuven.
1441		Tapestry weavers of Oudenaarde form the Guild of St Barbara.
1450	28 February	Tournament held on the main square in Leuven in the presence of Philip the Good, Duke of Burgundy and Brabant.
1451	28 October	Guilds of Ghent take up arms against the Count of Flanders, Philip the Good.
1452	31 May	Philip the Good declares war on the city of Ghent.
	7 September	Writer and translator Jean Wauquelin dies in Mons.
1453	23 July	Battle of Gavere: forces of Philip the Good defeat rebels of Ghent, ending their rebellion.
1454	17 February	The Feast of the Pheasant, a banquet given by Philip the Good, Duke of Burgundy, held in Lille.
1458	3 August	Tower of St. Peter's Church, Leuven, catches fire.
1459	Autumn	Beginning of the series of witch trials known as the Vauderie d'Arras.
1464	9 January–12 February	Estates General of 1464: first joint meeting of representatives of various territories of the Burgundian Netherlands.
1465	20 October	Battle of Montenaken: forces of Philip the Good defeat Liège militiamen.
	22 December	Treaty of Saint-Trond ends hostilities between Liège and Burgundy, subjecting the prince-bishopric of Liège to Burgundian control.
1466	19 to 25 August 1466	Dinant sacked by the forces of Philip the Good, commanded by Charles the Bold
1467	15 June	Death of Philip the Good; Charles the Bold succeeds as Duke of Burgundy.
	28 October	Battle of Brustem: forces of Charles the Bold defeat forces of Liège.
	12 November	City of Liège surrenders to Charles the Bold.
1468	3 July	Marriage of Charles the Bold and Margaret of York (Now commemorated with the five-yearly Procession of the Golden Tree)
	September	Liège again rises against Burgundian rule.
	27 October	Army of Charles the Bold reaches Liège.
	29 October	Six hundred Franchimontois raid the Burgundian encampment outside Liège, failing to dislodge besiegers.
	30 October to 2 November	City of Liège pillaged by Burgundian troops.
	3 November	Charles the Bold orders the city of Liège systematically razed, sparing only the churches and the houses of canons.
1469	1 July	Charles the Bold grants Prince-Bishop Louis of Bourbon permission to begin rebuilding Liège.
1473	24 April	Charles the Bold appointed mediator in the peace negotiations between Poland and Hungary.
	December	Charles the Bold overhauls the administrative structures of the Burgundian Netherlands: establishes Great Council of Mechelen; orders the chambers of accounts of Lille and Brussels be combined and sit in Mechelen.
1477	5 January	Charles the Bold dies in the Battle of Nancy.
	29 May	Joyous Entry of Mary of Burgundy in Leuven as Duchess of Brabant.
	18 August	Maximilian of Austria makes his entry into Ghent.
	19 August	Marriage between Mary of Burgundy and Maximilian of Austria celebrated.
1478	22 July	Birth of Philip the Fair
1479	7 August	Battle of Guinegate: forces of Mary of Burgundy and her husband Maximilian I of Habsburg defeat forces of Louis XI of France.
1480	10 January	Birth of Margaret of Burgundy
1482	27 March	Mary of Burgundy dies as a result of having fallen from her horse while hawking some weeks earlier. Leaving an infant heir and a foreign husband, this set the scene for the Flemish revolts against Maximilian of Austria (1483–1485).
	3 April	Funeral of Mary of Burgundy in Church of Our Lady, Bruges
	30 August	Louis de Bourbon, Bishop of Liège, assassinated by William de La Marck.
	19 November	Six women burned at the stake in Bruges for having committed "sodomy" with women.
	23 December	Treaty of Arras between Louis XI of France and Maximilian I of Habsburg as heir of the Burgundian Netherlands, ceding Burgundy and Artois to France.
		Oldest surviving parish register from the territory of what is now Belgium: marriage register from Brussels Minster.
1493	23 May	Treaty of Senlis: Charles VIII of France cedes the County of Flanders and County of Artois to the House of Habsburg.
1495	20 January	Wedding contracts concluded for the double marriage of Philip the Fair and Margaret of Burgundy to Joanna of Castile and John, Prince of Asturias.
	5 November	Double wedding by proxy of Philip the Fair and Margaret of Burgundy to Joanna of Castile and John, Prince of Asturias.
1496	20 October	Henry of Bergen, Bishop of Cambrai, celebrates nuptial mass of Philip the Handsome and Joanna of Castile at St Gummarus Church, Lier.
1500	24 February	Birth of the future Charles V, Holy Roman Emperor, in Ghent.
	7 March	Christening of the future Charles V, Holy Roman Emperor, in Ghent, with Margaret of York, Margaret of Austria, Charles, Prince of Chimay, and John, Lord of Bergen op Zoom as godparents.
	May	Philip of Burgundy received as ruler in Béthune, Saint-Omer and Dunkirk.
	9 June	Conference outside Calais between Henry VII of England and Philip of Burgundy.

== 16th century ==
Year	Date	Event
1501	18 July	Birth of Isabella of Austria, daughter of Philip of Burgundy and Joanna of Castile, future Queen of Christian II of Denmark.
1502		Katherine Hasselet commissioned to produce a series of tapestries on the life of St Anatoile — now the oldest known Flemish tapestries extant
1509	25 June	Pope Julius II grants indulgence for those contributing to the rebuilding of the collegiate church of Dinant, equal to the indulgence for a pilgrimage to Rome.
1511	2 April	Érard de La Marck, Prince-Bishop of Liège, orders publication of Julius II's bull granting an indulgence for those contributing to the rebuilding of the collegiate church of Dinant.
1521	8 May	Charles V issues decree for the Habsburg Netherlands prohibiting Lutheran preaching, teaching, printing or disputation, largely parallel to the Edict of Worms that he was to sign for the Empire as a whole on 26 May but providing more repressive powers to secular authorities.
1523	1 July	Johann Esch and Heinrich Voes burned at the stake in Brussels for their adherence to Lutheran doctrines.
	8 September	Pope Adrian VI draws up a last will and testament to dispose of his possessions in the Habsburg Netherlands, among other bequests founding a papal college for students of Theology at the University of Leuven.
1526	14 January	Peace of Madrid temporarily ends the war between Charles V and Francis I of France, with France briefly relinquishing all claim to the County of Flanders, County of Artois, Tournai and the Tournaisis, and the Duchy of Burgundy.
1531	26 September	Mary of Hungary appointed regent over the Habsburg Netherlands.
	1 October	Charles V establishes the three "collateral councils": the Council of State, Privy Council, and Council of Finances.
1532	11 September	Charles V issues decree establishing protocols and procedure of the reorganized Council of Luxembourg.
1540	4 October	New edict requiring printers and booksellers to provide local magistrates with inventories of their stock.
1546	9 May	University of Leuven issues the first index of prohibited books.
1542	August	French forces plunder Arlon.
	1 September	Francis I of France appoints Claude, Duke of Guise as governor of the Duchy of Luxembourg.
1544		Peace of Crépy ends the war between Charles V and Francis I of France, returning status quo of 1538: Duchy of Luxembourg restored to the Habsburg Netherlands.
1549	12 September	Edict regulating the organization of markets throughout the Habsburg Netherlands.
1559	12 April	King Philip establishes the Royal Library of the Low Countries.
1566	5 April	Compromise of Nobles petition Margaret of Parma to suspend the laws on heresy.
	31 July	Philip II of Spain authorises Margaret of Parma to abolish the inquisition in the Habsburg Netherlands.
	August to September	Iconoclastic Fury: churches and monasteries vandalised and plundered in many parts of the Habsburg Netherlands.
1567	15 March	Attempted Calvinist coup in Antwerp.
	June	Margaret of Parma reinstitutes suspended edicts against heresy.
1568	18 May	Duke of Alva banishes thirty inhabitants of the city of Antwerp and their spouses, with forfeiture of property, for supporting or disseminating Calvinism – including the pensionary of the city, Jacques van Wesenbeke, and the head of the Calvinist consistory in Antwerp, the Portuguese merchant Marcus Perez.
	5 June	Lamoral, Count of Egmont, and Philip de Montmorency, Count of Horn, executed in Brussels.
	20 October	Battle of Jodoigne
1569	17 May	Maximilien Morillon founds the first diocesan seminary in Mechelen.
1570	30 May	Abraham Ortelius' Theatrum Orbis Terrarum published in Antwerp.
	5 July	First of the criminal ordinances of 1570 issued, codifying and streamlining criminal procedure throughout the Habsburg Netherlands, followed on 9 July by further ordinances on imprisonment and on confessions and witness testimony.
1572	3 July	Gerard van Groesbeeck, Prince-Bishop of Liège, promulgates a new codification of the legal procedures in the principality's courts.
1574	6 June	Don Luis de Requesens, Governor of the Habsburg Netherlands, issues general pardon to rebels willing to return to loyalty.
1575	16 June	Philip II of Spain decrees that the change of year is to be counted from 1 January throughout the Habsburg Netherlands, rather than from Christmas (25 December), the Feast of the Annunciation (25 March) or Easter day, as was the custom in various parts.
1576	4 November	Sack of Antwerp by Spanish mutineers from the Army of Flanders.
	8 November	Pacification of Ghent: alliance of the provinces of the Habsburg Netherlands to drive mutineers from the Army of Flanders from the country and promote a peace treaty with the rebellious provinces Holland and Zeeland.
1577	1 May	John of Austria makes his formal entry into Brussels as Governor General of the Low Countries.
1578	1 October	Governor General John of Austria dies near Namur.
1579	6 January	Union of Arras concluded.
	17 May	Treaty of Arras signed between the Union of Arras and Philip II of Spain.
1596	11 February	Archduke Albert arrives in Brussels to begin his administration as Governor General of the Habsburg Netherlands.
	24 April	Archduke Albert takes Calais.
	18 August	Archduke Albert takes Hulst.
1597	11 March	Army of Flanders takes Amiens.
	10 September	Philip II of Spain decides to bequeath his lands in the Low Countries and Burgundy to his daughter, Isabella Clara Eugenia.
1598	2 May	Peace of Vervins signed.
	6 May	Philip II of Spain signs the Act of Cession bequeathing the Habsburg Netherlands to his daughter, the Infanta Isabella.
	13 September	Philip II of Spain dies.
	14 September	Archduke Albert departs from Brussels to marry the Infanta Isabella.
1599	9 February	Edict prohibiting all trade with the enemy issued.
	18 April	Archduke Albert marries Infanta Isabella.
	20 August	Archduke Albert and Infanta Isabella arrive in the Low Countries.
	28 August	Archduke Albert and Infanta Isabella make their Joyous Entry into Brussels.
1600	5 February	Battle of Lekkerbeetje in the countryside outside 's-Hertogenbosch
	28 April	Estates General meet in Brussels.
	2 July	Battle of Nieuwpoort between the armies of Maurice of Nassau and the Archduke Albert.

== 17th century ==
Year	Date	Event
1601	5 July	Siege of Ostend begins.
1602	7 January	General assault on Ostend launched.
	July	Ambrogio Spinola arrives in the Low Countries with 8,000 men to reinforce the Army of Flanders
	18 July to 20 September	Siege of Grave
	September	Mutiny of Hoogstraten begins.
	November	Military engineer Pompeo Targone arrives in the camp before Ostend.
1603	26 May	Federico Spinola dies in the Battle of Sluis.
	2 June	Tanneken Sconyncx, suspected witch, dies under torture.
	October	Ambrogio Spinola appointed commander-in-chief of the army besieging Ostend.
1604	19 May	Maurice of Nassau lays siege to Sluis.
	20 September	Negotiations for the surrender of Ostend begin.
	22 September	Siege of Ostend concludes.
1605	17 May	Don Íñigo de Borja repulses attempted Dutch landing at Blokkersdijk, near Antwerp.
	1 July	Foundation of Liège College, Leuven
1607	August	Beginning of a series of six witch trials in Laarne (ending May 1608).
1609	9 January	Death of Joannes Bochius, secretary to the city of Antwerp
	9 April	Twelve Years' Truce agreed in Antwerp
1611	12 July	Perpetual Edict (1611) reforming the basic rules of criminal and civil procedure in the courts of the Habsburg Netherlands.
1614	6 May	Aylid, wife of Giele le Hayverlin, sentenced to death for witchcraft by the magistrates of Ouffet: one of the first trials in a local spate of witchcraft accusations.
	27 December	Death of Maximiliaan de Vriendt, secretary to the city of Ghent
1617		Fund-raising lottery held to fund the opening of Mounts of piety in the Low Countries.
1618	28 September	Opening of Mount of piety (low-interest loan bank) in Brussels, founded by Wenceslas Cobergher.
1619	May to September	Tax resistance by Guilds of Brussels.
1620	19 February	First Flemish newspaper, Nieuwe Tijdinghen, begins regular publication.
	3 May	Chamber of Rhetoric De Peoene hosts a rhetoric competition in Mechelen.
1621	April	Twelve Years' Truce expires.
	13 July	Death of Albert VII, Archduke of Austria; Spanish Netherlands revert to Philip IV of Spain; Isabella Clara Eugenia remains in Brussels as Governess General
1622	29 August	Battle of Fleurus: Army of Flanders defeats Protestant German invasion force.
1624	Lent	Fr Charles of Brussels preaches the Forty Hours' Devotion at the court chapel in Brussels.
	9 November	Charles Alexandre de Croÿ, Marquis d'Havré shot through a window of his house in Brussels, dying the following day.
1629	30 April to 14 September	Siege of 's-Hertogenbosch: one of the four chief cities of the Duchy of Brabant falls to the Dutch Republic.
1632		Political crisis: Conspiracy of Nobles and Siege of Maastricht prompt Isabella Clara Eugenia, Governess General of the Spanish Netherlands, to summon the final session of the Estates General.
1633	1 December	Death of Isabella Clara Eugenia
1634	4 November	Arrival of Cardinal-Infante Ferdinand of Austria as new governor general.
1635	May to July	Beginning of hostilities in the Franco-Spanish War (1635–59): Battle of Les Avins, Sack of Tienen, Siege of Leuven
1637	17 April	Exiled Dutch nobleman René de Renesse, 1st Count of Warfusée, has the mayor of Liège, Sébastien de La Ruelle, murdered by Spanish soldiers.
1638	24 May to 16 July	Siege of Saint-Omer: French army fails to take the city of Saint-Omer
	20 June	Battle of Kallo: Cardinal-Infante Ferdinand of Austria prevents Dutch forces from encircling Antwerp.
1639	7 June	Relief of Thionville: imperial forces under Ottavio Piccolomini break the French siege of Thionville in the Duchy of Luxembourg
1642	26 May	Army of Flanders victorious in the Battle of Honnecourt
		David Teniers the Younger, The Guard Room (painting)
1643	19 May	Army of Flanders defeated in the Battle of Rocroi
		David Teniers the Younger, The Oude Voetboog Guild in the Grote Markt (painting)
1644		Pieter and François Hemony cast the first tuned carillon
	28 July	Gravelines taken by the French after a two-month siege
1648	15 May	Peace of Münster ends the war with the Dutch Republic.
1651	20 March	Archduke Leopold Wilhelm of Austria lays the foundation stone of the Capuchin church in Brussels, designed by Fr Charles of Brussels.
1652	14 July	Jacobus de la Torre consecrates the new Capuchin church in Brussels, designed by Fr Charles of Brussels.
1658	14 June	Battle of the Dunes: the Army of Flanders and British Royalist allies fail to raise the French-Cromwellian Siege of Dunkirk, leading to the loss of the city.
1666	2 October	Charles II of Great Britain issues the city of Bruges with a Fisheries Privilege in gratitude for the hospitality shown him by the city during his exile.
1669	5 June	Death of Fr Charles of Brussels at the Capuchin house in Brussels.
1671	27 June	Marguerite Tiste, a native of Jemappes convicted of witchcraft, strangled and burned at the stake on the main square in Mons.
1675	13 November	Death of Leonard Voeller, secretary of state for German affairs 1642-1675.
1695	2 July to 1 September	Siege of Namur
	13–15 August	Bombardment of Brussels by the army of Louis XIV

== 18th century ==
Year	Date	Event
1704	20 June	Edict in the name of Charles VI, Holy Roman Emperor, reorganises office of notary in the Habsburg Netherlands.
1711	30 September	Art school established in Brussels, later to become the Royal Academy of Fine Arts, Brussels.
1713	29 January	Second Barrier Treaty confirms the closing of the Scheldt.
1714	6 March	Treaty of Rastatt signed: hostilities between France and Austria arising from War of the Spanish Succession cease; Spanish Netherlands become Austrian Netherlands.
1715		Start of Flemish China trade.
1719	5 February to 3 August	The Saint-Joseph sails from Ostend to Canton.
	19 September	Frans Anneessens, dean of the masons' guild, beheaded in Brussels for resisting innovations in city government detrimental to the power of the guilds of Brussels.
1720	3 June	The Saint-Joseph reaches its home port of Ostend after a voyage to Canton, bringing a cargo of tea, porcelain, silk, and Chinese roots.
1722	19 December	Charles VI, Holy Roman Emperor grants a charter to the Ostend Company to trade with the Indies.
1723	22 April	Work starts on Henri-Joseph Rega's new wing on the University Hall (Leuven).
	11–12 August	Shares in the Ostend Company issued on Antwerp Exchange.
1725	14 March	Henri-Joseph Rega's new wing on the University Hall (Leuven), taken into use.
1727	18 July	Ostend Company petitions for the harbour of Ostend to be deepened.
1734	16 February	Ostend Company officially ceases trading in accordance with the Treaty of Vienna (1731).
1737	16 February	Ostend Company officially wound up.
1738		Henri-Joseph Rega establishes Leuven's botanical garden.
1744		Henri-Joseph Rega establishes Leuven University's anatomical theatre.
1745	11 May	Battle of Fontenoy
	9 July	Battle of Melle
	15 July	Fall of Ghent
	August	Siege of Ostend
1746	January to February	Siege of Brussels
	11 October	Battle of Rocoux
1748	24 April	Congress of Aix-la-Chapelle convenes in Aachen to negotiate an end to the War of the Austrian Succession
	18 October	Treaty of Aix-la-Chapelle ends the War of the Austrian Succession
1771	7 January	Privy Council grants necessary permits for artillery general Joseph de Ferraris to chart Mechelen and Brabant.
1775		François-Charles de Velbrück establishes an academy of fine arts in Liège
1778	6 August	Government edict regulating registration of baptisms, weddings and funerals: parish priests ordered to ensure that registrations of baptisms include the child's date of birth and the parents' places of birth; of weddings include the full names, status, place of birth and place of residence of the parties; of funerals include the date and time of death; and that a copy of each year's new entries in the parish register be deposited with the provincial authorities every January.
1779	5 April	François-Charles de Velbrück founds the Société littéraire de Liège.
1780	29 November	Death of Maria Theresa.
1782	1 August	Council of Luxembourg becomes a "sovereign" court: its legal decisions can no longer be appealed to the Great Council of Mechelen.
1787	1 January	Joseph II, Holy Roman Emperor, decrees the abolition of the Council of Brabant and the institution of new law courts for the Duchy of Brabant, to take effect from 1 May 1787.
	20 April	Council of Brabant declares its abolition unconstitutional.
	21 September	Joseph II's interim minister plenipotentiary, Sir Joseph Murray, 3rd Baronet, postpones the abolition of the Council of Brabant.
1788	22 January	Council of Brabant refuses to issue a new decree by Joseph II's minister plenipotentiary, Ferdinand von Trauttmansdorff.
1789	26 August	Republic of Liège proclaimed.
	October	Army of émigré volunteers invades the Austrian Netherlands. Manifesto of the People of Brabant published. Government forces defeated in Battle of Turnhout (1789).
1790	4 January	Manifesto of the Province of Flanders: States of Flanders repudiate loyalty to the count of Flanders and the House of Austria and declare the old County of Flanders an independent sovereign state
	11 January	United States of Belgium proclaimed.
	22 September	Battle of Falmagne: short-lived restoration of Austrian rule in the Low Countries
1791	13 February	Austrian military intervention restores César-Constantin-François de Hoensbroeck as prince-bishop of Liège
1792	16 November	Battle of Jemappes: French gain control of Belgium and Liège.
	23 December	The men of the village of Hekelgem assemble and declare that they wish to remain Catholic and continue to live as a free people under the institutions of the Duchy of Brabant, rather than accept French rule.
1793	18 March	Battle of Neerwinden: short-lived restoration of Austrian rule in the Low Countries.
	12–13 September	Battle of Menin between French and Dutch forces
	15 September	First Battle of Courtrai between French and Austrian forces
1794	26 June	Battle of Fleurus: decisive French victory in the Flanders Campaign of the French Revolutionary Wars.
	17–18 September	Battle of Sprimont: final Austrian defeat in the Low Countries
1795	1 October	Former Austrian Netherlands and Prince-Bishopric of Liège unilaterally annexed to the French First Republic.
	6 November	Decree of 14 Brumaire, Year IV brings into force in Belgium the Le Chapelier Law 1791 abolishing craft guilds and prohibiting membership of trade unions.
1796	17 June	Decree of 29 Prairial, Year IV establishes civil registration of births, marriages and deaths throughout what is now Belgium.
	August	Moveables and archives of the guilds of Brussels sold at public auction on the Grand-Place.
1797		Suppression of religious life begins in earnest.
	28 June	École Centrale for the Department of the Scheldt inaugurated in Ghent.
	18 October	By the Treaty of Campo Formio the Austrian monarchy accepts the French annexation of the former Austrian Netherlands.
1798	October to December	Peasants' War (Boerenkrijg) in Flanders and Brabant; peasant army defeated near Hasselt on 5 December.
1799	21 June	Execution of Pieter Corbeels, one of the leaders of the Peasant Army, in Tournai.

== 19th century ==
Year	Date	Event
1801	9 February	Treaty of Lunéville reaffirms French annexation of the former Austrian Netherlands.
1806	27 May	Minor Seminary, Roeselare, opens.
1810	2 May	Napoleon Bonaparte attends the launching of the warship Friedland in Antwerp.
1814	31 March	Battle of Courtrai between French and Saxon forces.
	21 July	Belgium made part of the United Kingdom of the Netherlands.
1815	16 June	Battle of Ligny: Napoleon Bonaparte's last victory.
	18 June	Battle of Waterloo: final defeat of Napoleon Bonaparte.
1820		Publication of J. B. Romberg's A New Picture of Brussels and its Environs
1822		Société Générale founded
1823		Publication of Edmund Boyce's The Belgian Traveller (4th edition)
1830	25 August	Belgian Revolution begins
	26 December	Allied powers recognise Belgian independence.
1831	21 July	Leopold, Prince of Coburg, sworn in as king of the Belgians.
	2–12 August	Ten Days' Campaign: Dutch attempt to re-establish rule over Belgium fails, but Dutch forces retain control of Antwerp Citadel.
1832	20 October	Albert Joseph Goblet d'Alviella replaces Félix de Muelenaere as Prime Minister
	15 November to 23 December	Siege of Antwerp by Belgian army with French support forces Dutch from Antwerp Citadel.
1834	4 August	Barthélémy de Theux de Meylandt replaces Albert Joseph Goblet d'Alviella as Prime Minister
1835	9 June	Partial legislative elections held.
1836	18 June	Belgium adopts the metric system.
1837	28 December	Pastoral letter of Belgian bishops deprecates Catholic membership of masonic lodges.
1838		Hendrik Conscience's De Leeuw van Vlaenderen published.
1839	4 February	The Kingdom of the Netherlands recognises Belgian independence.
	19 April	Treaty of London signed, finalising international guarantees of Belgian independence and neutrality.
1840	18 April	Joseph Lebeau replaces Barthélémy de Theux de Meylandt as Prime Minister
1841	13 April	Jean-Baptiste Nothomb replaces Joseph Lebeau as Prime Minister
1845	30 July	Sylvain Van de Weyer replaces Jean-Baptiste Nothomb as Prime Minister
1846	31 March	Barthélémy de Theux de Meylandt replaces Sylvain Van de Weyer as Prime Minister
1847	12 August	Charles Rogier replaces Barthélémy de Theux de Meylandt as Prime Minister
1848	1 April	French Republican agitators seeking to foment revolution in Belgium arrested at Quiévrain.
	13 June	Belgian general election, 1848
1850	5 May	National Bank of Belgium founded
	11 June	Partial legislative elections
1851	27 October	Commercial treaty between Belgium and the United Kingdom concluded in London.
1852	8 June	Partial legislative elections of 1852
	31 October	Henri de Brouckère replaces Charles Rogier as Prime Minister
1853	22 August	Marriage of Leopold, Duke of Brabant, heir to the Belgian throne, and Marie Henriette of Austria.
1854	27 February	Commercial treaty with France on tariffs, transit and navigation for five years.
	13 June	Partial legislative elections of 1854
1855	30 March	Pierre de Decker replaces Henri de Brouckère as Prime Minister
1856	10 June	Partial legislative elections of 1856
1857	9 November	Charles Rogier replaces Pierre de Decker as Prime Minister
	10 December	Belgian general election, 1857
1859	18 April	Five-year commercial treaty with France (1854) extended for two more years.
	14 June	Partial legislative elections of 1859
	31 August	Lower House of the Belgian Parliament passes a motion for the fortification of Antwerp.
1860	9 July	Belgian consulate in Damascus destroyed during anti-Christian pogroms.
	18 July	Civic customs duties abolished.
1861	11 June	Partial legislative elections of 1861
1863	12 May	Dutch government agrees to perpetual abolition of tolls on the Scheldt river in return for a payment of 17 million guilders
	9 June	Partial legislative elections of 1863
1864	11 August	Belgian general election, 1864
1865	10 December	Death of Leopold I; succeeded by Leopold II
1866	12 June	Partial legislative elections of 1866
1867	13 February	Work begins on covering of the Senne in Brussels.
1868	3 January	Walthère Frère-Orban replaces Charles Rogier as Prime Minister
	9 June	Partial legislative elections of 1868
1869	April	Violent repression of strikes in Belgium inspires Karl Marx to write The Belgian Massacres.
1870	11 June	Partial legislative elections of 1870 return a hung parliament
	2 July	Jules d'Anethan replaces Walthère Frère-Orban as Prime Minister
	2 August	Belgian general election, August 1870, to break impasse of hung parliament
	23 September	Sumptuous public celebration of the 40th anniversary of Belgian independence.
1871	21 February	Regular railway services between France and Belgium resumed.
	7 December	Barthélémy de Theux de Meylandt replaces Jules d'Anethan as Prime Minister
1872	11 June	Partial legislative elections of 1872
1874	9 June	Partial legislative elections of 1874
	21 August	Prime Minister Barthélémy de Theux de Meylandt dies in office; succeeded by Jules Malou
1875	8 April	Birth of future king Albert I of Belgium
1876	13 June	Partial legislative elections of 1876
1878	June to July	Partial legislative elections of 1878
	19 June	Walthère Frère-Orban replaces Jules Malou as Prime Minister
1880	8 June	Partial legislative elections of 1880
	25 December	Pope Leo XIII issues a breve to establish a new chair in Thomist philosophy at the Catholic University of Louvain.
1881	6 March	Review L'Art Moderne begins publication.
1882	6 May	North Sea Fisheries Convention signed, to come into effect in 1884.
	13 June	Partial legislative elections of 1882
	31 July	Désiré-Joseph Mercier appointed to the new chair in Thomist philosophy at the Catholic University of Louvain.
1883	28 October	Founding meeting of the art association Les XX
1884	16 June	Jules Malou replaces Walthère Frère-Orban as Prime Minister
	June and July	Belgian general election, 1884
	26 October	Auguste Beernaert replaces Jules Malou as Prime Minister
1885	6 April	Inaugural meeting of the Belgian Labour Party held in Brussels
	2 May to 2 November	World Exhibition in Antwerp
1886	18–29 March	Series of strikes and disturbances in industrial areas of Wallonia
	8 June	Partial legislative elections of 1886
1888	12 June	Partial legislative elections of 1888
1889	15 April	Death of Father Damien
1890	10 June	Partial legislative elections of 1890
	8 November	Composer César Franck dies
1892	14 June	Belgian general election, 1892
1893	12–18 April	General strike demanding an extension of the franchise
	15 April	Inaugural meeting of the Christene Volkspartij held in Okegem, with a party programme drafted by Adolf Daens
1894	26 March	Jules de Burlet replaces Auguste Beernaert as Prime Minister
	5 May to 5 November	International Exposition (world's fair) in Antwerp
	14 October	Belgian general election, 1894
1896	25 February	Paul de Smet de Naeyer replaces Jules de Burlet as Prime Minister
	5 and 12 July	Partial legislative elections of 1896
1897	10 May to 8 November	Exposition Internationale (world's fair) held in Brussels
1898	22 May	Partial legislative elections of 1898
1899	24 January	Jules Vandenpeereboom replaces Paul de Smet de Naeyer as Prime Minister
	5 August	Paul de Smet de Naeyer replaces Jules Vandenpeereboom as Prime Minister
	3 December	Antoon Stillemans, bishop of Ghent, suspends Adolf Daens as a diocesan priest due to his political activism
1900	27 May	Belgian general election, 1900
	2 October	Wedding of King Albert I of Belgium and Elisabeth of Bavaria.

== 20th century ==
Year	Date	Event
1901	3 November	Birth of future king Leopold III of Belgium.
1902	25 May	Partial legislative elections
	15 November	Italian anarchist Gennaro Rubino attempts to assassinate Leopold II
1904	1 May	Belgium national football team play their first official game, against France.
	29 May	Partial legislative elections
1905	27 April to 6 November	Exposition Universelle et Internationale de Liège takes place.
1906	27 May	Partial legislative elections
1907	23 July	Port of Zeebrugge formally opened.
1908	24 May	Partial legislative elections
	15 November	Belgium assumes sovereignty of the Congo under the Colonial Charter on the Belgian annexation of the Congo Free State
1909	17 December	Death of Leopold II, King of the Belgians
	23 December	Accession of Albert I as King of the Belgians
1910	23 April to 1 November	Exposition Universelle et Internationale (world's fair) held in Brussels.
	22 May	Partial legislative elections
1911		Stoclet Palace completed
		Maurice Maeterlinck awarded the Nobel Prize in Literature
1912	2 June	Belgian general election, 1912
1913	6 April to 31 October	Exposition universelle et internationale (1913), World's Fair in Ghent.
1914	24 May	Partial legislative elections
	4 August	German invasion with attendant atrocities: beginning of Belgian involvement in the First World War.
1918	11 November	Armistice ends First World War.
1919	16 November	Belgian general election, 1919
1920	14 August to 12 September	1920 Summer Olympics held in Antwerp.
1921	June	Crown Prince Hirohito's official visit to Belgium.
	20 November	Belgian general election, 1921
1923	23 May	Sabena is founded at Brussels Airport
1925	6 March	Annexation of Eupen and Malmedy to the Kingdom of Belgium.
	5 April	Belgian general election, 1925
		Henri de Baillet-Latour is elected President of the International Olympic Committee
1926	20 October	Labour Treaty establishing free movement of labour between Belgium and Luxembourg signed at Luxembourg.
	10 November	Wedding of King Leopold III of Belgium and Astrid of Sweden.
1929	10 January	The Adventures of Tintin first published in Le Petit Vingtième
	26 May	Belgian general election, 1929
1930	3 May to 3 November	Exposition internationale held in Liège
	7 September	Birth of future king Baudouin of Belgium
1931	12 May	Eugène Ysaÿe dies.
1932	27 November	Belgian general election, 1932
1933	20 February	Convention regarding Establishment and Labour signed at Geneva, establishing free movement of labour between Belgium and the Netherlands.
1934	17 February	Death of Albert I, King of the Belgians.
	6 June	Birth of King Albert II of Belgium
1935	27 April to 6 November	Brussels International Exposition (1935) held in Heysel, near Brussels.
	29 August	Queen Astrid dies in a car crash
1936	24 May	Belgian general election, 1936
1937	22–25 May	King Baudouin makes a state visit to Britain.
1939	2 April	Belgian general election, 1939
	30 July	Exposition internationale de l'eau opens in Liège.
1940	10 May	German invasion: beginning of Belgian involvement in the Second World War.
1941	11 September	King Leopold III secretly marries Lilian Baels
1944	17–18 August	courcelle massacre.
1944	4 September	Liberation of Brussels and Antwerp.
	5 September	Customs Convention between Belgium, the Netherlands and Luxembourg signed.
	16 December	German reinvasion: the Battle of the Bulge begins.
1945	25 January	Liberation of Belgium completed.
	8 May	End of World War II in Europe.
1946	17 February	Belgian general election, 1946
	12 April	Flemish nationalist leader August Borms executed by firing squad as a collaborator
1947	8 September	Victor Horta dies.
1948	1 January	Customs Convention between Belgium, the Netherlands and Luxembourg comes into force.
	17 March	Belgium, France, Luxembourg, the Netherlands, and the United Kingdom sign the Treaty of Brussels, establishing the Brussels Pact for economic, social and cultural collaboration and collective self-defence.
	25 August	Treaty of Brussels, establishing the Brussels Pact for economic, social and cultural collaboration and collective self-defence, comes into effect.
1949	26 June	Belgian general election, 1949
1950	12 March	Royal Question brought to a head with Belgian monarchy referendum, 1950
	4 June	Belgian general election, 1950
1951	18 April	Treaty of Paris signed, establishing the European Coal and Steel Community.
	16 July	King Leopold III abdicates
	17 July	Baudouin of Belgium sworn in as king
1952	25 July	Treaty of Paris establishing the European Coal and Steel Community comes into force.
1953	31 January to 1 February	North Sea flood damages Belgian coastal defences, killing 28
1954	11 April	Belgian general election, 1954
	23 October	Paris Protocol agreed, transforming the Brussels Pact into the Western European Union (with Germany and Italy joining).
1955	March–July	First phase of the Second School War
1956	7 June	Labour Treaty signed at The Hague establishing free movement of labour between Belgium, Luxembourg and the Netherlands, to come into force 1 November 1960.
	8 August	Mining accident of Marcinelle claims 262 lives, including 136 Italian foreign workers
1957	25 March	Belgium a signatory to the Treaty of Rome establishing the European Economic Community.
1958	17 April to 19 October	Expo 58, the first major World's Fair since the Second World War.
	1 June	1958 Belgian general election
1960	15 April	Birth of future King Philippe of Belgium
	June	Belgian Congo becomes independent; on the eve of the celebrations Ambroise Boimbo snatches the ceremonial sabre of King Baudouin.
	1 November	Treaty establishing Benelux Economic Union comes into force, providing for the free movement of persons, goods, capital and services between Belgium, the Netherlands, and Luxembourg.
1961	17 January	Patrice Lumumba killed in Congo
	26 March	1961 Belgian general election
1962	14 October	Rioting in Brussels between Flemish nationalist and Francophone demonstrators.
1963		Jeanne Deckers, the Singing Nun, becomes world famous.
1964		Salvatore Adamo becomes one of the most commercially successful musicians in the world.
1965	31 March	Treaty to establish a Benelux Court of Justice signed.
	23 May	1965 Belgian general election
1966	10 February	Belgium ratifies London Fisheries Convention.
	15 March	London Fisheries Convention regulating fisheries in the North Sea comes into force.
1968	31 March	1968 Belgian general election
	24 June	Split of the Catholic University of Leuven announced.
1971	29 September to 1 October	Emperor Hirohito's state visit to Belgium.
	7 November	1971 Belgian general election
1974	10 March	1974 Belgian general election
1977	17 April	1977 Belgian general election
	11 October	Award of Nobel Prize in Chemistry to Ilya Prigogine announced
1978	9 October	Jacques Brel dies.
	11 October	Leo Tindemans resigns as Prime Minister after the failure of the Egmont pact.
	17 November	1978 Belgian general election
1981	8 November	1981 Belgian general election
1985	16 to 21 May	Pope John Paul II visits Belgium.
	13 October	1985 Belgian general election
1986	3 May	Sandra Kim wins the Eurovision Song Contest 1986 singing "J'aime la vie".
1987	13 December	1987 Belgian general election
1988		Stella Artois merges with Piedboeuf Brewery to form Interbrew
1990	4–5 April	Constitutional crisis: King Baudouin suspended as king for 36 hours after refusing to sign a law legalising abortion
1991	18 July	Assassination of Socialist politician André Cools.
	24 November	1991 Belgian general election
1992		Dirk Frimout is the first Belgian in Space
1993	31 July	King Baudouin of Belgium dies in Motril
	9 August	Albert, Prince of Liège becomes 6th King of the Belgians
1995	21 May	1995 Belgian federal election
	June	Pope John Paul II visits Belgium.
1996	20 October	White March: approximately 300,000 people demonstrate to protest police and judicial inefficiency and demand improved child protection in the wake of the Dutroux affair
		Famous cyclist Eddy Merckx created baron by King Albert
1999	13 June	1999 Belgian federal election
	12 July	Verhofstadt I Government sworn in
	4 December	Wedding of Prince Philippe and Mathilde d'Udekem d'Acoz
2000	22 September	Stock exchanges of Amsterdam, Brussels and Paris merge as Euronext.

== 21st century ==
Year	Date	Event
2001	25 October	Elisabeth, duchess of Brabant is born in Anderlecht.
	6 November	Belgian national airline Sabena declared bankrupt
2002	1 January	Euro enters into circulation to replace the Belgian franc
	November	Frank De Winne is the second Belgian in space
		Strépy-Thieu boat lift is completed
2003	18 May	Belgian federal election, 2003 leads to formation of Verhofstadt II Government (sworn in 12 July)
2004	1–22 March	Trial of serial killer and child molester Marc Dutroux, sentenced to life imprisonment
2005		Celebration of 175 years of Belgian independence and 25 years of federalism
2006	8 October	2006 Belgian local elections
2007	10 June	Belgian federal election, 2007
2008	20 March	Leterme I Government sworn in
	30 December	Van Rompuy Government sworn in following Yves Leterme's resignation as Prime Minister
2009	4 January	Johan Bonny consecrated as bishop of Antwerp
	11 October	Father Damien canonised by Pope Benedict XVI
	December	Herman Van Rompuy becomes the first President of the European Council
2010	27 February	André-Joseph Léonard succeeds Godfried Danneels as archbishop of Mechelen-Brussels
	22 April	Fall of Leterme II Government
	23 April	Pope Benedict XVI accepts the resignation of child molester Roger Vangheluwe as bishop of Bruges
	13 June	Belgian federal election, 2010 leads to formation of Di Rupo Government 541 days later
2011	October	Sixth Belgian state reform finalised
	6 December	Di Rupo Government sworn in 541 days after the Belgian federal election, 2010
2012	24 October	Closure of Ford Genk announced, to be completed in 2014 with loss of over 4,000 jobs.
2013	21 July	Philippe becomes 7th king of the Belgians
2014	24 May	Jewish Museum of Belgium shooting kills four
	25 May	Belgian federal election, 2014
2015	6 November	Jozef De Kesel succeeds André-Joseph Léonard as archbishop of Mechelen-Brussels
	21 to 25 November	Brussels lockdown
2016	22 March	2016 Brussels bombings
	20 December	Publifin scandal breaks in Le Vif/L'Express
2017	31 May	Samusocial scandal breaks in Brussels parliament
2018	9 December	Michel I Government splits, to be succeeded by Michel II Government, after division over endorsement of the Global Compact for Migration
2019	26 May	2019 Belgian federal election
2020	4 February	Public confirmation of first patient tested positive for the COVID-19 pandemic in Belgium
2021	4 to 5 May	DDOS attack on Belnet disrupts accessibility of websites using the .be domain, including those of the Belgian government, parliament, police, educational and research institutions, health care, and public broadcasters, forcing the postponement of parliamentary hearings relating to the persecution of Uyghurs in China.
2022	8 June	King Philippe of Belgium condemns the racism of Belgium's colonial history in Congo.
2023	18 December	Largest criminal trial in Belgian history begins in Brussels.
2024	9 June	2024 Belgian federal election

History of the Low Countries (schematic)
Frisii		Germanic tribes		Belgae & Celts			
Frisii	Cana– nefates (Note: Roman foederati)	Chamavi, Tubantes (Note: The Chamavi merged into the confederation of the Franks; the Tubantes merged into the confederation of the Saxons.)		Gallia Belgica (55 BC–c. 5th century AD); Germania Inferior (83–c. 5th century)			
Frisii	Cana– nefates	Salian Franks		Batavi			
unpopulated (4th –c. 5th centuries)		Saxons	Salian Franks (4th–c. 5th centuries)				
Frisian Kingdom (c. 6th century – 734)		Saxons	Frankish Kingdom (481–843)—Carolingian Empire (800–843)				
Frisian Kingdom (c. 6th century – 734)		Austrasia (511–687)					
Middle Francia (843–855)				West; Francia (from 843)	Middle Francia (843–855)		
Kingdom of Lotharingia (Note: Part of East Francia after 939, divided in Upper Lorraine (as part of West Francia) and Lower Lorraine (as part of East Francia) in 959.) (855–959); Duchy of Lower Lorraine (Note: Lower Lorraine—also referred to as Lothier—disintegrated into several smaller independent territories and only the title of a "Duke of Lothier" remained, held by Brabant.) (from 959)			Kingdom of Lotharingia (855–959); Duchy of Lower Lorraine (from 959)	West; Francia (from 843)	Kingdom of Lotharingia (855–959); Duchy of Lower Lorraine (from 959)		
Frisia			Kingdom of Lotharingia (855–959); Duchy of Lower Lorraine (from 959)	County of Flanders (Note: Including County of Artois (part of Flanders until 1237) and Tournaisis.) (862–1384)	Kingdom of Lotharingia (855–959); Duchy of Lower Lorraine (from 959)		
Frisian; Freedom (Note: Lordship of Frisia and Lordship of Groningen (including the Ommelanden) after 1524 and 1536 respectively.) (11th–16th centuries)	County of Holland (Note: Including County of Zeeland, that was ruled by neighboring County of Holland and County of Flanders (until 1432).) (880–1432)	Bishopric of Utrecht (Note: Utrecht included Lordship of Overijssel (until 1528), County of Drenthe (until 1528) and County of Zutphen (until 1182).) (695–1456)	Duchy of Brabant (Note: Duchy of Brabant included since 1288 also the Duchy of Limburg (now part of Belgium's Liège Province) and the "Overmaas" lands Dalhem, Valkenburg and Herzogenrath (now part of the Dutch Province of Limburg).) (1183–1430) Duchy of Guelders (Note: The county, later duchy, of Guelders consisted of four quarters, as they were separated by rivers: situated upstream Upper Quarter (the present day northern half of the Dutch province of Limburg), spatially separated from the three downstream Lower Quarters: County of Zutphen (after 1182), Veluwe Quarter and Nijmegen Quarter. The three lower quarters emerged from the historic gau Hamaland (named after the Chamavi tribe), and formed the present day province of Gelderland. Guelders did not include the Cleves enclave Huissen and the independent counties of Buren and Culemborg, that were much later seceded to the province of Gelderland.) (1046–1543)	County of Flanders (862–1384)	County of Hainaut (1071–1432) County of Namur (981–1421)	Prince- Bishopric of Liège (Note: Throughout the Middle Ages, the bishopric was further expanded with the Duchy of Bouillon in 1096 (ceded to France in 1678), the acquisition of the county of Loon in 1366 and the county of Horne in 1568. The Lordship of Mechelen was also part of the Prince-Bishopric of Liège.)(980–1791)	Duchy of Luxembourg (1059–1443)
Frisian; Freedom (11th–16th centuries)	Burgundian Netherlands (1384–1482)					Prince- Bishopric of Liège (980–1791)	Burgundian Netherlands (1384–1482)
Habsburg Netherlands (1482–1795) (Seventeen Provinces after 1543) (Note: The name Seventeen Provinces came in use after the Habsburg emperor Charles V had re-acquired the Duchy of Guelders, and an continuous territory arose.)						Prince- Bishopric of Liège (980–1791)	Habsburg Netherlands (1482–1795) (Seventeen Provinces after 1543)
Dutch Republic (1581–1795)				Spanish Netherlands (1556–1714)		Prince- Bishopric of Liège (980–1791)	Spanish Netherlands (1556–1714)
Dutch Republic (1581–1795)				Austrian Netherlands (1714–1795)		Prince- Bishopric of Liège (980–1791)	Austrian Netherlands (1714–1795)
Dutch Republic (1581–1795)				United States of Belgium (1790)		Republic of Liège (1789–'91)	United States of Belgium (1790)
Dutch Republic (1581–1795)				Austrian Netherlands (1795–1797)		P.-Bish. of Liège (1791–1794)	Austrian Netherlands (1795–1797)
Batavian Republic (1795–1806); Kingdom of Holland (1806–1810)			associated with French First Republic (1795–1804) part of First French Empire (1804–1815)				
part of First French Empire (1810–1813)			associated with French First Republic (1795–1804) part of First French Empire (1804–1815)				
Sovereign Principality of the Netherlands (1813–1815)			associated with French First Republic (1795–1804) part of First French Empire (1804–1815)				
United Kingdom of the Netherlands (1815–1830)							Grand Duchy of Luxembourg (from 1815)
Kingdom of the Netherlands (from 1839)				Kingdom of Belgium (from 1830)			Grand Duchy of Luxembourg (from 1815)
Kingdom of the Netherlands (from 1839)				Kingdom of Belgium (from 1830)			Grand Duchy of Luxembourg (from 1890)

== See also ==
- History of Belgium
  - History of Wallonia
  - History of Flanders
  - History of the Jews in Belgium
- Timeline of Burgundian and Habsburg acquisitions in the Low Countries
- List of Belgian historians

Cities in Belgium

- Timeline of Antwerp
- Timeline of Bruges
- Timeline of Brussels
- Timeline of Ghent
- Timeline of Leuven
- Timeline of Liège
