= Nithard of Liège =

Nithard was bishop of Liège, in the Low Countries, from 1038 to 1042.

== Life ==
Nithard, who had lived in Liège for decades, was elected bishop in succession to his uncle Reginard, on the endorsement of Wazo of Liège, who had been ahead in the voting and would eventually be elected as his successor. The monastic chronicler Renier of St Laurent recorded that Nithard had kept for himself the riches that his uncle had intended to be used for the benefit of his soul after his death.

Immediately after his election, Nithard travelled to Italy, where his appointment was confirmed by Henry III, King of the Romans, at Nonantola in January 1038. In August 1039 he attended upon the king in Maastricht. On 17 and 24 January 1040 his presence was again attested in the royal entourage, at Augsburg and Ulm respectively. In Ulm the emperor granted the bishop the County of Haspinga. On 5 June 1040 Nithard was among the bishops who accompanied the king to the Princely Abbey of Stavelot-Malmedy for the consecration of the new church, built by Abbot Poppo.

On 29 December 1040 Nithard was in Münster for the consecration of an altar there, and on 3 June 1041 he was at Aachen, seeking royal favour for the Collegiate Church of Saint Gertrude, Nivelles. He died in Liège on 11 August 1042 and was buried in the cathedral, to which he had donated considerable treasures.

Catholic Church titles
Preceded by Reginard	Bishop of Liège; 1038–1042	Succeeded by Wazo
