= Battle of Bar-le-Duc =

1037 battle

The Battle of Bar-le-Duc was a confrontation between two feudal armies led by Odo II, Count of Blois, and Gothelo I, Duke of Lorraine, that took place on 15 November 1037 outside Bar in the Duchy of Lorraine.

== Background ==
When Rudolph III of Burgundy died in 1032, his kingdom was inherited by Emperor Conrad II and incorporated into the Holy Roman Empire. Rudolph's nephew, Odo II, continued to dispute this outcome, maintaining his own right to the inheritance.

== Conflict ==
In 1037, Conrad II led an army to Italy to put down a rebellion in Lombardy. Odo took advantage of his absence to invade the Duchy of Lorraine and occupy the city of Bar. Emissaries from the rebels in Italy offered him the Kingdom of Italy if he would come to their aid.

Initially having been taken by surprise, Gothelo I, Duke of Lorraine, had meanwhile been able to raise an army—in part by appealing to Reginard, bishop of Liège, and Albert II, Count of Namur for troops. When their armies met outside Bar, six hours of fighting ensued at the conclusion of which Odo's forces were defeated. Odo himself died in the rout.
