= Wolbodo =

Saint and bishop of Liège from 1018 (c. 950–1021)

Saint Wolbodo (c. 950 – 20 April 1021) was the bishop of Liège from 1018 to 1021.

St. Wolbodo's day is celebrated on 21 April.

== Life ==
Wolbodo probably descended from a Flemish noble family related to that of the Counts of Flanders. After being educated at the cathedral school in Utrecht, he became a canon of Utrecht Cathedral, and in 1012 scholaster there. He later became provost of the cathedral chapter.

He was appointed to the see of Liège after the death of Baldrick II (29 July 1018), and negotiated the release of Godfrey II, Duke of Lower Lorraine, who had been captured by Dirk III, Count of Holland, at the Battle of Vlaardingen. In November 1018 he was consecrated bishop in Liège by Heribert of Cologne, assisted by Gerard of Cambrai, in the presence of Emperor Henry II.

He named Olbert of Gambloux as head of the Abbey of St James in Liège, and in 1020 deposed Ingobrand as abbot of Lobbes Abbey, replacing him with Richard of Saint-Vanne. In 1020 he also installed Poppo, prior of the Abbey of Saint-Vaast in Cambrai, as abbot of Stavelot Abbey.

He bequeathed his moveables, 300 marks of silver and his lands in Flanders to the Abbey of St Laurence, Liège, and was buried in the abbey's crypt. In 1656 his tomb was opened and his remains reburied.

== Veneration ==
After his death Wolbodo was honoured as a saint. He is a patron saint of students. In Delft the student society Menschen Vereeniging Wolbodo is named after him.

Catholic Church titles
Preceded by Baldrick II	Bishop of Liège; 1018–1021	Succeeded by Durandus
