= Theodwin of Liège =

Belgian prince-bishop

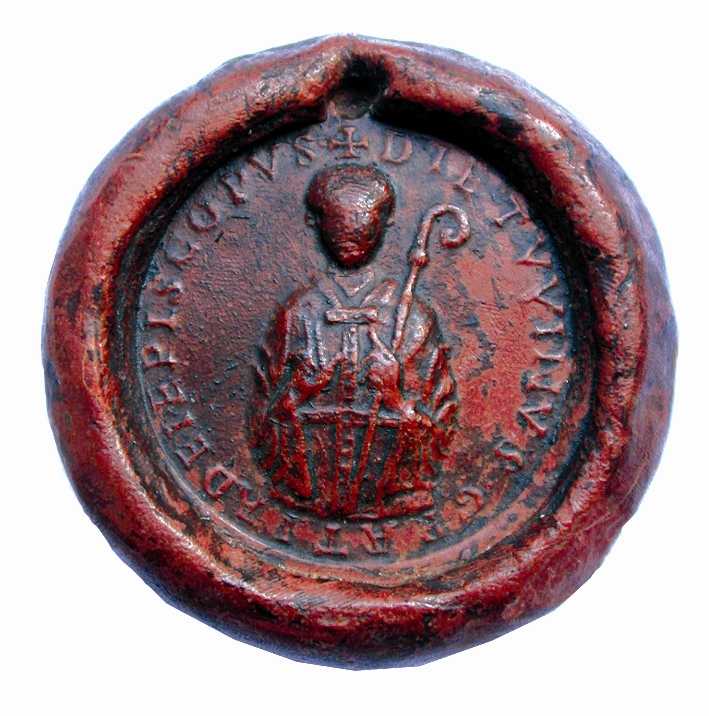
Seal of Theodwin of Liège from the Charter of Huy (1066)

Theodwin (Latin Dietwinus) was prince-bishop of Liège from 1048 to 1075.

== Life ==
Originally from Bavaria, Theodwin was named by Henry III to succeed Wazo as bishop of Liège. In 1049 he led the imperial victory over Dirk IV of Frisia. In 1050-1051 he wrote to Henry I of France encouraging him to take firm action against Berengar of Tours.

In 1066, Theodwin ceded city rights to Huy, the oldest such charter to survive from what is now Belgium. On 23 March 1075 Pope Gregory VII wrote to him reproachfully about the lax clerical discipline in his diocese, urging him to leave the Abbey of Saint-Hubert unmolested.

Theodwin died on 23 June 1075 and was buried in the collegiate church at Huy, which he had built, consecrated and endowed with fifteen prebends.
