= Anselm of Liège =

Belgium historian (1008–c.1056)

Anselm of Liège (1008 – c. 1056) was a chronicler of the eleventh century of the Prince-Bishopric of Liège.

== Biography ==
He was educated at the episcopal school of Liège, and became canon and dean of the cathedral, where he enjoyed the friendship of the bishop of Liège, Wazo. His chronicle, regarded as one of the best of the period, both for literary merit and for historical value, is known as the Gesta Episcoporum Tungrensium, Trajectensium, et Leodiensium, and is a continuation of the earlier work by Heriger of Lobbes (d. 1007) that dealt with the first twenty-seven bishops, from Maternus of Cologne (90) to Remaclus (680). Anselm's work, written at the request of his godmother, the countess Ida, Abbess of St. Cecilia, Cologne, added the lives of twenty-five more bishops, down to Wazo, of whom he gave a very full and particular account.

The Gesta is to be found in the Monumenta Germaniæ Historica (Scriptores, VII, 161-234; also Scriptores, XIV, 107-120 (1883)). The 1913 Catholic Encyclopedia praises Anselm for his clarity, his "critical intelligence", and his "zeal for church reform".
