= Collegiate Church of Our Lady, Dinant =

Roman Catholic church in Dinant, Belgium

Coordinates: 50.261012°N 4.9120°E

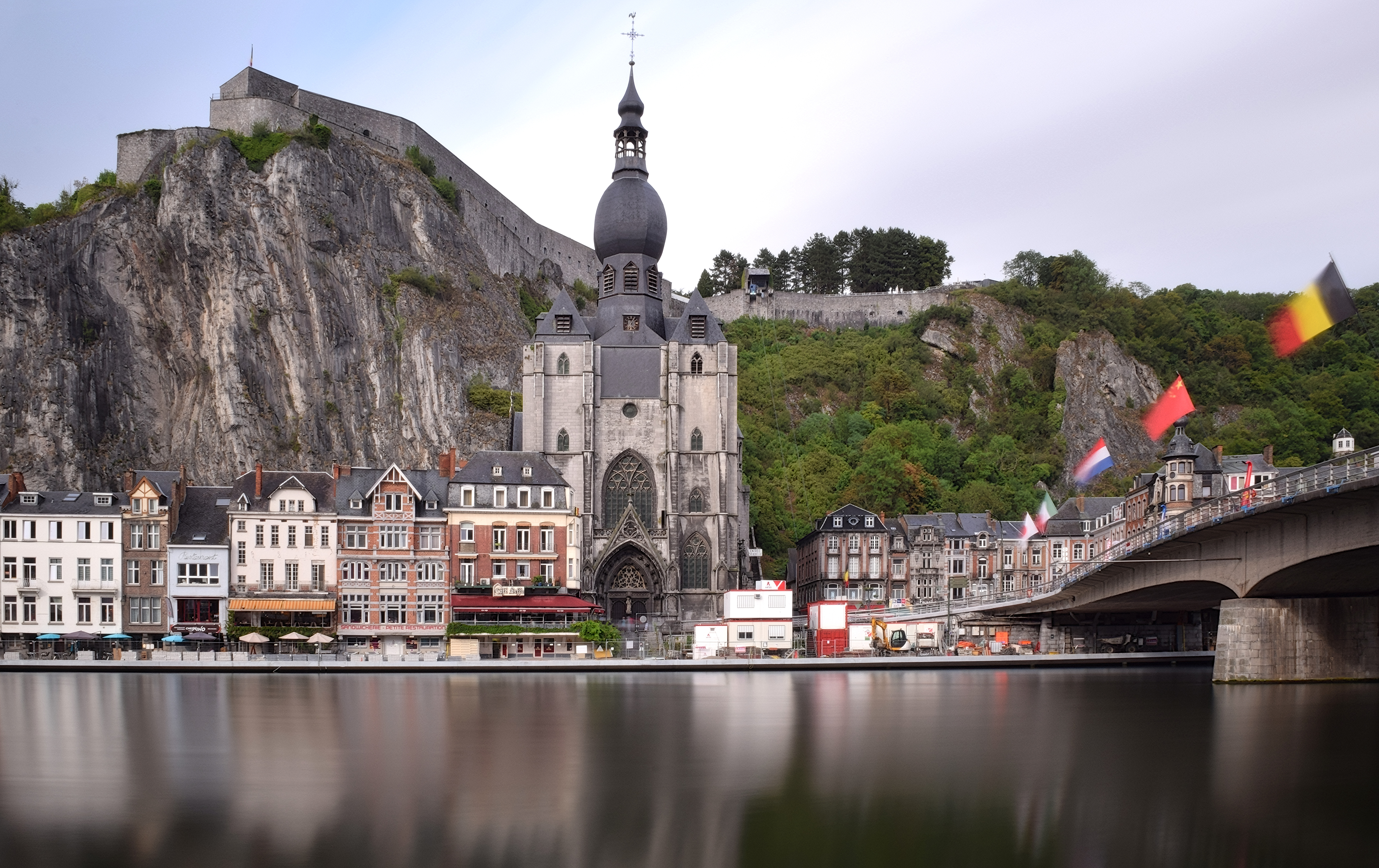
The Church, with the city, the citadel, and the Meuse river

The Collegiate Church of Our Lady of Dinant (French: Collégiale Notre-Dame de Dinant) is a Roman Catholic collegiate church located in Dinant, a city in Wallonia (southern Belgium), on the banks of the river Meuse. The 13th-century Gothic building replaced a 10th-century Romanesque church which collapsed in 1228, leaving only the north door. Its most iconic part is the separate 16th-century pear-shaped bell tower.

== Gallery ==
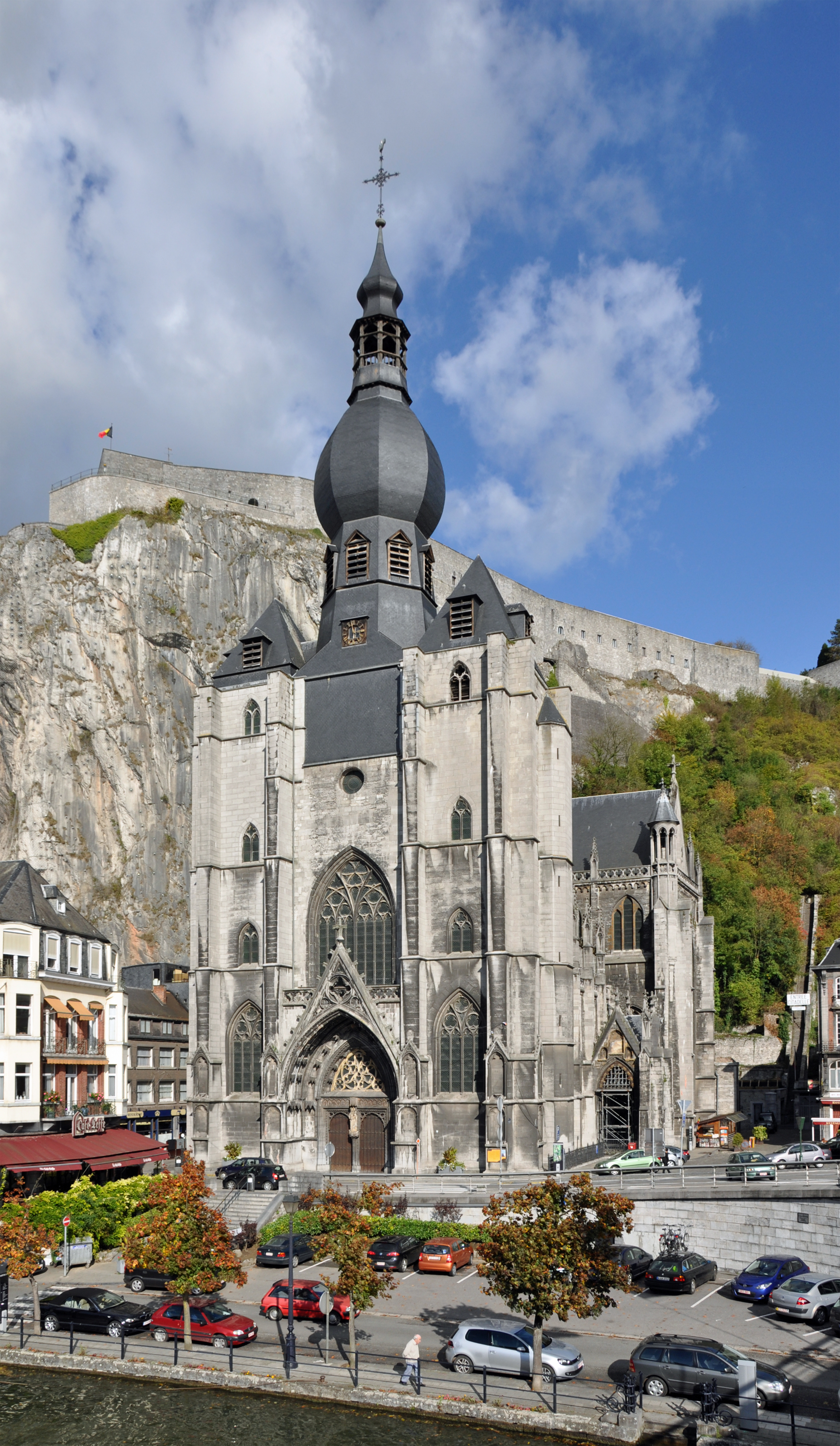
Church exterior

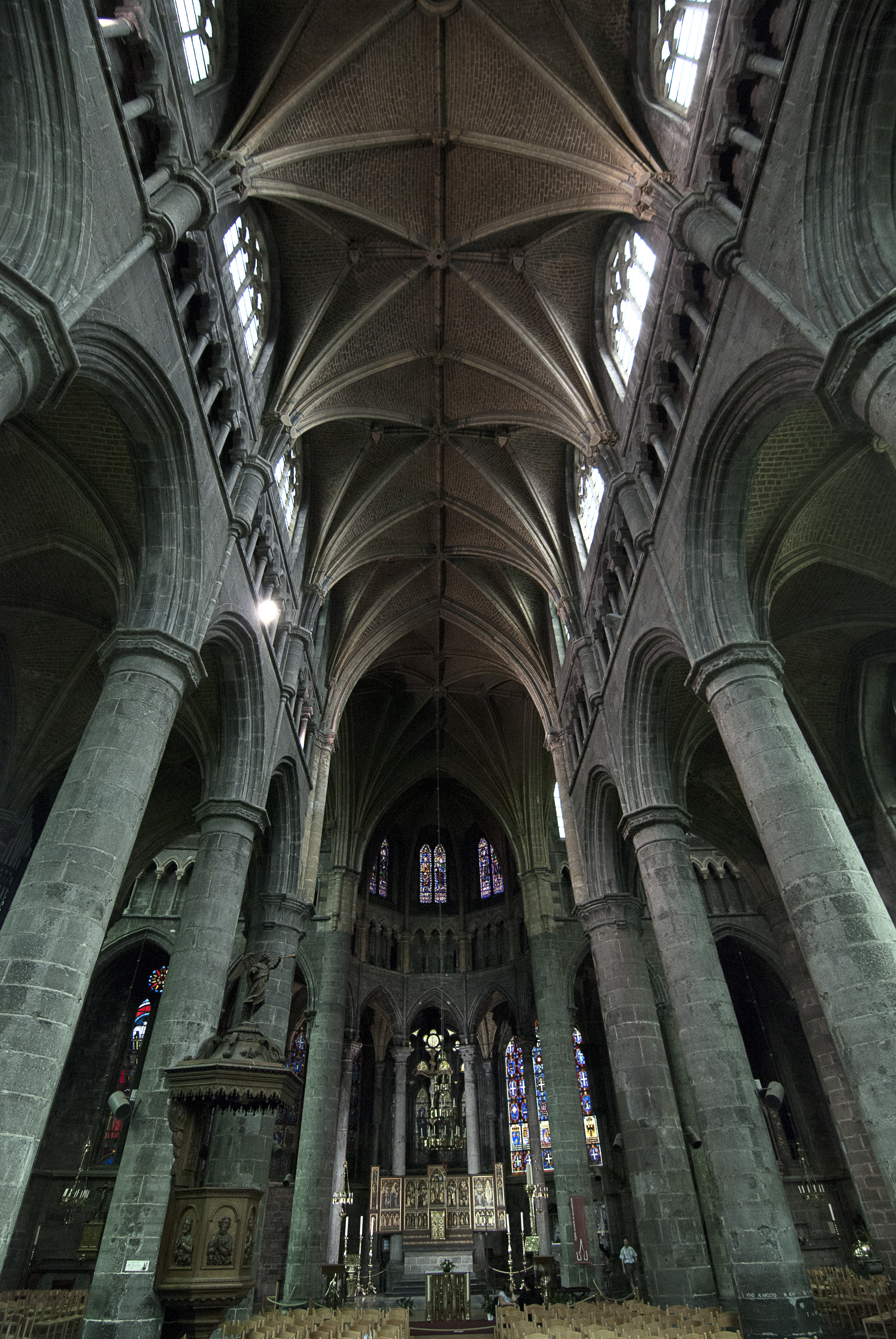
Interior

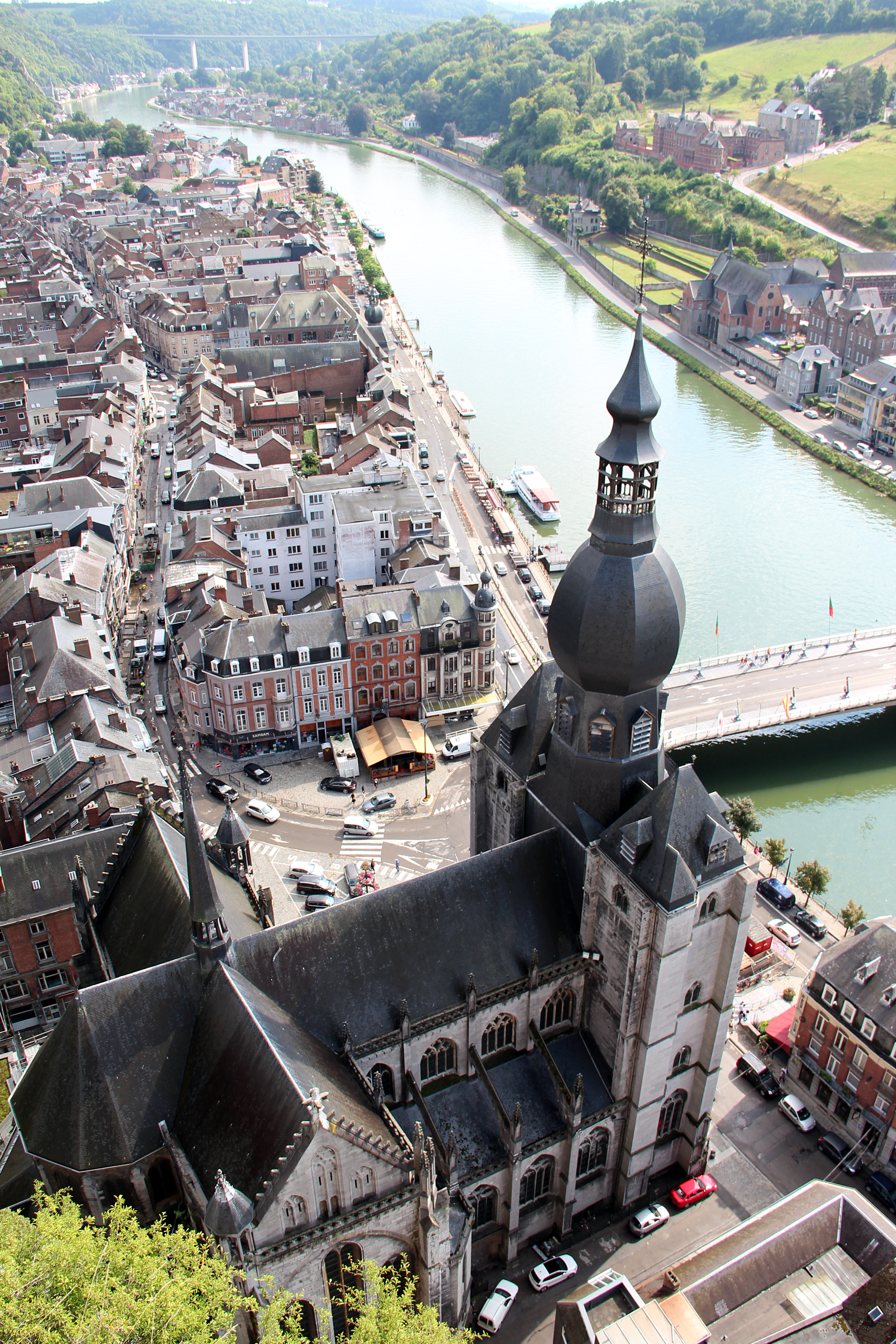
From above

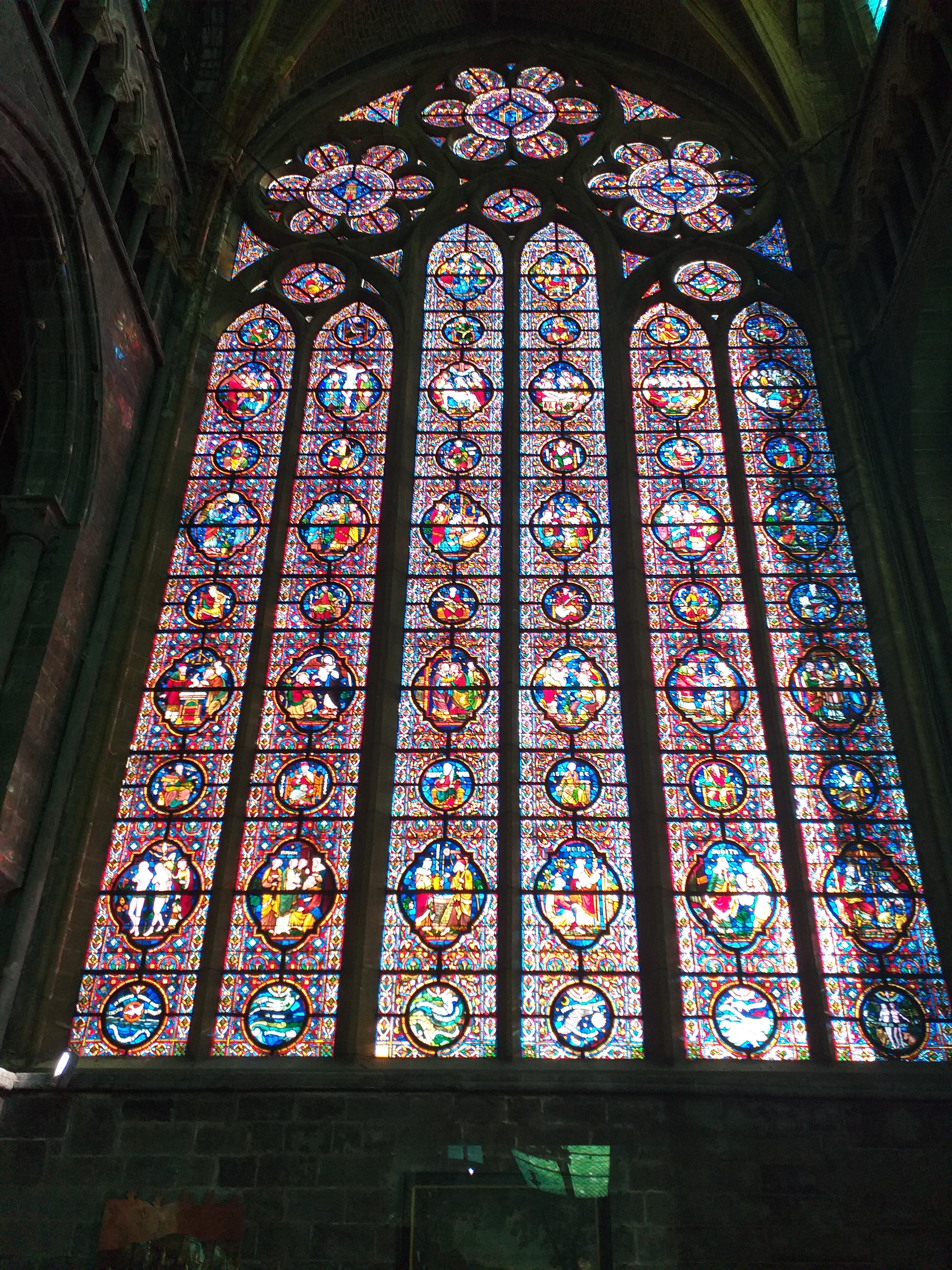
Stained glass
