= Durandus of Liège =

Bishop of Liège (died 1024/5)

Durandus (died 1024/5) was an 11th-century bishop of Liège.

== Life ==
Durandus was born to an obscure family in Morialmé, in the principality of Liège, and was a vassal of the local lord. Recommended to Notker of Liège by his lord, he was educated in the bishop's school. On the recommendation of Wolbodo, Emperor Henry II appointed him vice-chancellor of the Empire and scholaster of Bamberg Cathedral.

After Wolbodo's death, in 1021, Durandus succeeded him as bishop of Liège. He consecrated the church of Gembloux on 25 July 1022. In 1023 he took part in the Synod of Cologne.

He died in Liège on 23 January 1024 or 1025.

Catholic Church titles
Preceded by Wolbodo	Bishop of Liège; 1021–1024/5	Succeeded by Reginard
