= Fisheries Privilege (1666) =

Eternal grant of fishing rights in English waters to Belgian fishermen by King Charles II

The Fisheries Privilege is a charter issued by Charles II granting rights to 50 fishermen from Bruges to fish in British coastal waters in perpetuity. It was considered to be a demonstration of gratitude for his exile there from 1656 to 1659. The charter was forgotten for many years but has regained prominence on three occasions. The exact status in law of the agreement remains open to this day.

== History ==
=== Charles II in Bruges ===
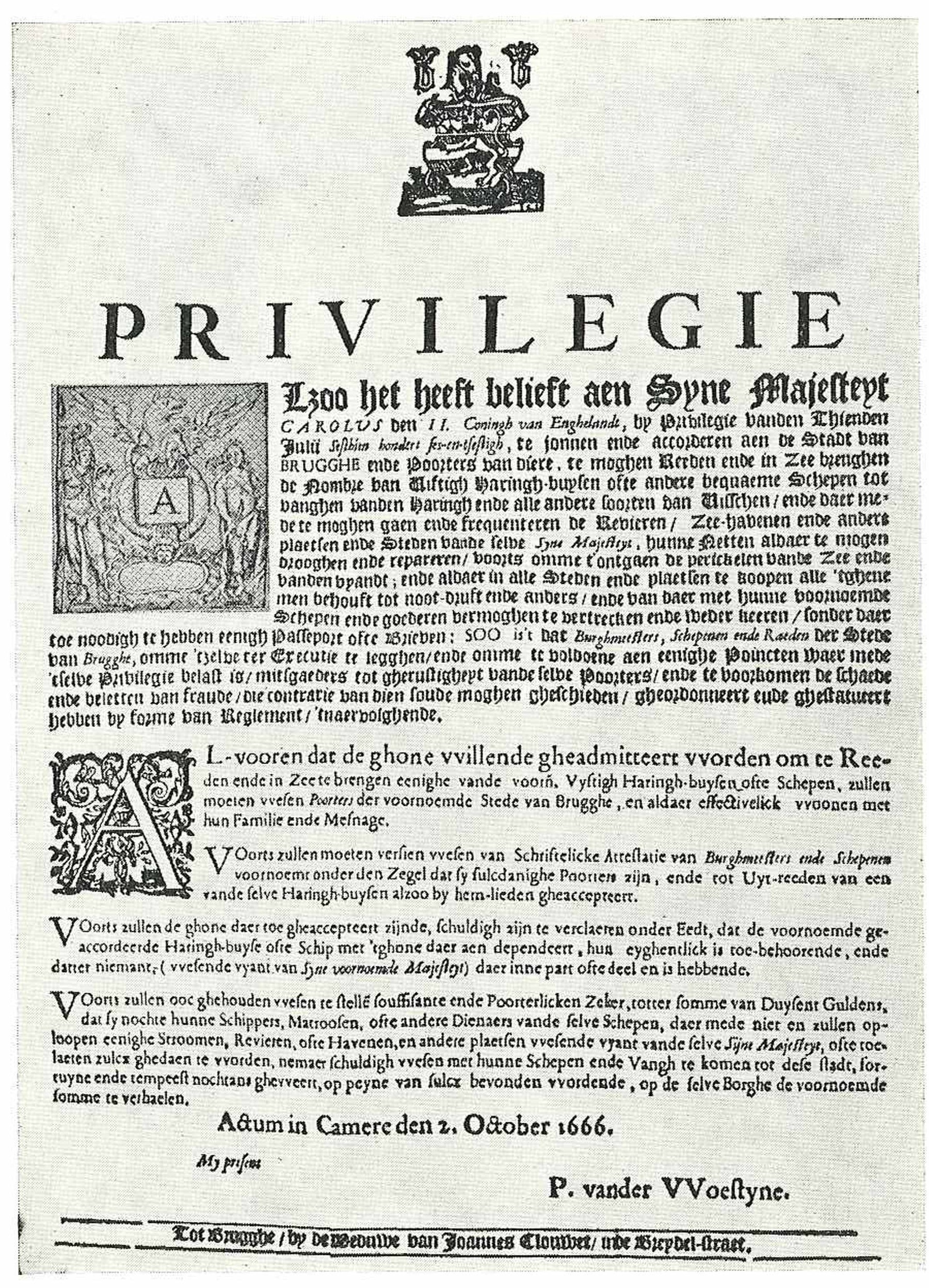
Publication of the Charter

Having been driven from Britain in 1651 by Oliver Cromwell, Charles initially sought refuge in Paris and the Cologne. However, when he attempted to reach Brussels he was barred by Philip IV of Spain who wanted to avoid a conflict with Cromwell. The two princes secretly agreed to join forces to regain the British throne for Charles and to allow Charles to settle anonymously in Bruges. During his stay in Bruges, Charles was an active member of the civil society of Bruges and became a member of the Saint Joris Guild, through which he made some strategic friendships. When Oliver Cromwell was succeeded by his son Richard, Charles went to Brussels (1659) in order to prepare his return to Britain. In June 1660 he officially regained the throne of England. In 1666 his earlier guide and friend in Bruges, the knight Arrazola de Oñate was named "exceptional" ambassador to Charles by the Spanish king Philip IV with the intention to negotiate a trade treaty. Although the treaty has been lost, the City of Bruges still possesses a charter granting privileges to the fishermen of Bruges to fish in English waters. The charter was never really tested until 1851 due to the numerous conflicts that affected Europe between its signing and the mid nineteenth century.

== Conflicts ==
=== 19th century ===
In 1849 Britain initiated the first negotiation with the newly founded Kingdom of Belgium about a fishing convention. The aim of the United Kingdom was to keep exclusive fishing rights for its fishermen up to 3 nautical miles from the coast. Belgium sent the former prime minister Sylvain Van de Weyer as special envoy to London with the aim of preserving the status quo. The strength of the Belgian case was reinforced by the head of the Bruges Chamber of Commerce (Mr Sinave) spoke of the existence of the Fisheries Privilege of 1666 in a letter to the Foreign Minister (Constant d'Hoffschmidt). Initially the British government was unaware of the Charter.

The British foreign minister H. J. Temple implicitly recognised the existence of the charter in a letter to the Belgian ambassador.

... the undersigned has the honour to inform M. Van de Weyer that the persons claiming under these Charters must establish their claims in the proper Law Courts of England and Scotland, and that after the Belgian Fishermen will not be allowed to fish on the Coast of the United Kingdom except in so far as any of the parties claiming shall have succeeded in establishing their rights in due course of Laws.

— H. J. Temple, British Foreign Minister 1846-1851

The government of Belgium decided not to pursue the legal route and prioritised a fisheries convention covering all Belgian fishermen (rather than just the fishermen of Bruges).

During the debate in the Belgian senate about the signature of the Convention between Great Britain and Belgium, relative to Fishery (22 March 1852), it was claimed that the treaty was without prejudice to the Fisheries Privilege of 1666;

... (la convention) attribue aux pècheurs des deux Etats le traitement de la nation la plus favorisée pour l'exercise de la pêche sur les còtes de chaque pays, sans préjudice des droits que les pecheurs belges pourraient tirer des chartes du roi Charles II.

— Exposé des Motifs

=== 20th century ===
In 1963, the issue of the Charter of 1666 came to the fore once more when a certain Victor Depaepe wrote to the Belgian Prime Minister, the British Prime Minister (Harold Macmillan), and the British Queen informing them that he wished to avail himself of the rights granted under the charter of 1666. He informed them that he intended to be arrested at sea so that he could press his claim in the English courts. On 8 July his boat "'King Charles the Second" (Z.264) was intercepted by the Royal Navy off the coast of East Sussex near Seaford. The case never came before the courts and according to papers released in 1993 under the 30 year rule it became clear that the British legal team advised the British agriculture minister to avoid a court case because they considered that the Charter was still legally enforceable.

=== 21st century ===
In 2020 during a Brexit-related meeting of EU ambassadors, Belgium's Ambassador Extraordinary and Plenipotentiary to the European Union, Willem Van De Voorde, cited the treaty when the issue of the future access of European fishing fleets came up. Flemish Vice minister-president and Minister of Economy and Agriculture Hilde Crevits confirmed during a Radio 1 interview that a legal team is looking into the treaty as a backup plan but that they prefer an agreement between the United Kingdom and the European Union.
