= Hortus Botanicus Lovaniensis =

Belgian Botanical Garden

Coordinates: 50.8779°N 4.6901°E

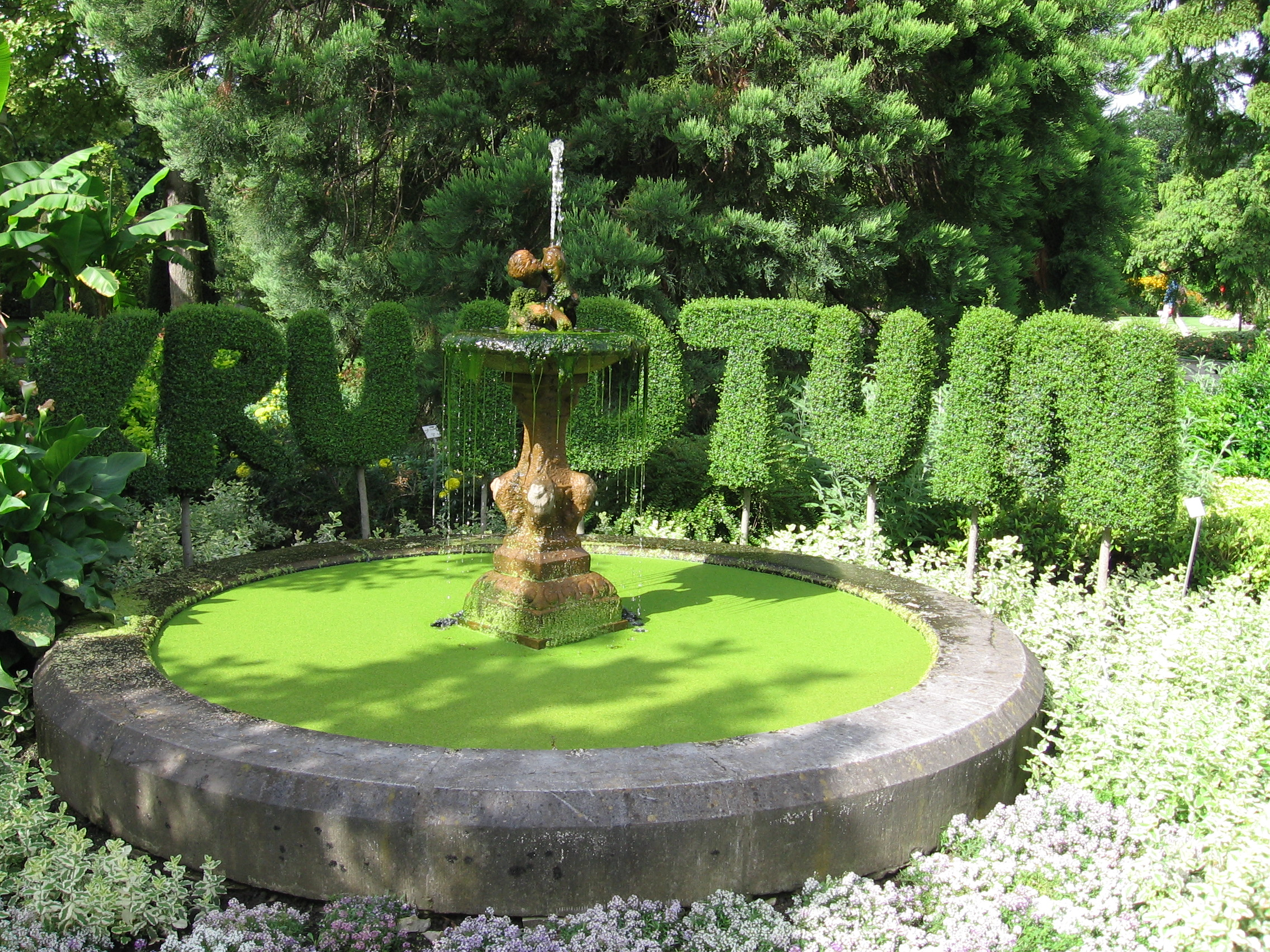
Fountain near side entrance of Kruidtuin

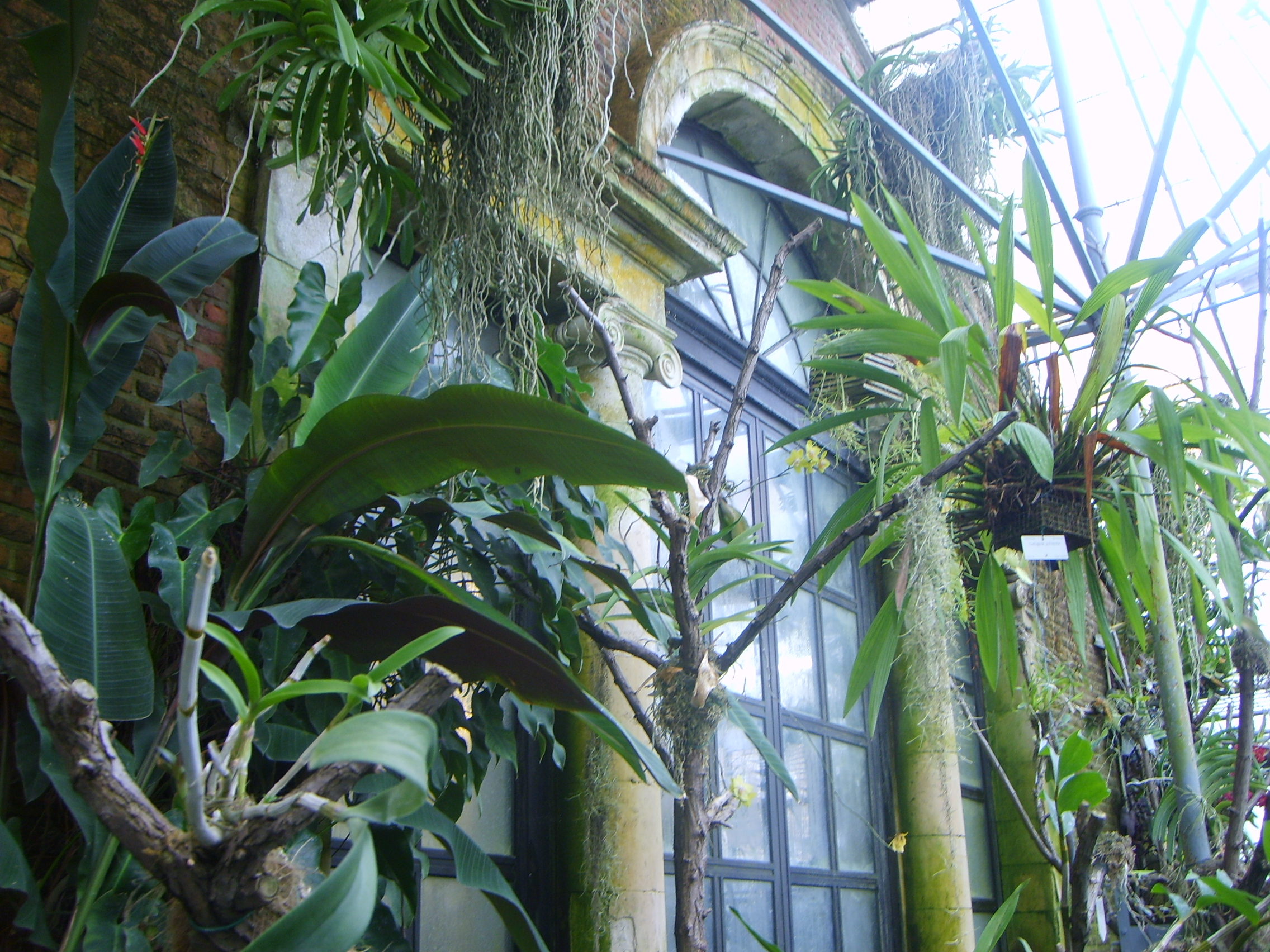
A greenhouse of the orangery

The Hortus Botanicus Lovaniensis (Dutch: Kruidtuin) is a botanical garden in Leuven, Belgium, dating from 1738. It is situated in the city centre and has an extent of 2.2 hectares.

== History ==
A first botanical garden was established in Leuven in 1738 by Henri-Joseph Rega, Professor of Medicine at the University of Leuven. Its first aim was to provide herbs for medical use. Later, the gardens became used for study purposes and they hosted an extensive collection of ornamental plants, cultivated plants with economic potential, and rare plants.

When the university was closed in 1797, the botanical garden was seized by the state. A botanical garden was re-established in the 1820s, adjacent to the original garden, under the auspices of the new State University of Leuven. When the State University closed in 1835, ownership of the new botanical garden was transferred to the city authorities. In 1874, a girls' school was built over the original site of the 1738 botanical garden, but the newer garden established in the 1820s continues in use as a municipal park. Access is free and it is used extensively by tourists and citizens alike. The garden functions sometimes as a place of exhibition for contemporary art.
