= Reginard =

Reginard was bishop of Liège in the Low Countries from 1025 to 1037, and had the city's first stone bridge over the Meuse built, the Pont des Arches.

== Life ==
The earliest sources are contradictory on Reginard's background, but it seems likely that he was originally from Liège itself or the area of the County of Loon. His ecclesiastical career, however, began in Bonn, where he was appointed to a canonry by Heribert of Cologne, with whom he had studied at Gorze Abbey in the Duchy of Lorraine. In 1025 Emperor Conrad II nominated him as bishop of Liège in succession to Durandus. According to the chroniclers of St Laurence's Abbey, Liège, he acquired the appointment through simony but repented and tendered his resignation to the Pope, who insisted that he retain the nomination.

In the first year of his episcopacy, he was criticised by Gerard, bishop of Cambrai, for his laxity in simply releasing suspected heretics after they had made an orthodox profession of faith, and for allowing someone excommunicated in Cambrai to be buried in consecrated ground in Liège. According to the chronicler Anselm of Liège, in 1026 refugees from famine-stricken lands to the west of Liège sought succor in the city, and Reginard encouraged others to support them while providing doles of food for 300 of them at his own expense. In 1036, Reginard and Gerard together consecrated the newly rebuilt church of Lobbes Abbey. In 1037 he provided troops from Liège to support Gothelo I, Duke of Lorraine's forces in their struggle against the invading Odo II, Count of Blois, culminating in the Battle of Bar-le-Duc.

Reginard was a particular patron of St Laurence's Abbey in Liège, reconsecrating their church in 1034 and granting the community numerous charters, as well as showing favour to the Church of St Bartholomew in Liège.

Reginard died on 5 December 1037 and was buried in Saint Lambert's Cathedral. In 1569, his tomb was opened and he was found to have been buried with his crosier beside him and a small silver chalice next to his head.

About a century after his death, a Vita Reginardi was composed by Renier, a monk of Saint Laurence's, which historians consider to have very little value as a source.
