= Wazo of Liège =

Belgium bishop and theologian (c. 985–1048)

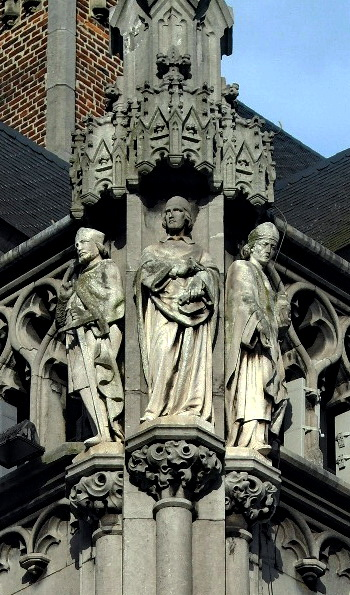
19th-century statue of Wazo (right), Palais Provincial, Liège

Wazo of Liège (c. 985 – 1048) was bishop of Liège from 1041 to 1048, and a significant educator and theologian. His life was chronicled by his contemporary Anselm of Liège.

During this period Liège became known as an educational center. Wazo, who had himself studied under Heriger of Lobbes, served as scholaster under Notker of Liège before succeeding Notker as bishop.

He is noted also for his nuanced approach to cases of heresy (not common in his day). In a letter he wrote to Roger, Bishop of Châlons, he quoted the New Testament Parable of the Tares and argued "the church should let dissent grow with orthodoxy until the Lord comes to separate and judge them".

He was involved in the period 1021–5 in a controversy with John, canon and provost in Liège; Durandus of Liège, then bishop, had Wazo leave for a time. His election as bishop in 1041 was strongly contested, with Emperor Henry III against him.
