= Antoine of Arenberg =

Prince Antoine d'Arenberg (1593-1669), also known as Father Charles of Brussels, was a Capuchin biographer and architect who served as definitor and commissary-general of his order.

== Life ==
Arenberg was born in Brussels, the son of Charles, Prince of Arenberg. He bore the title 'Count of Seneghem' but renounced the world and on 4 March 1616 was clothed in the Capuchin habit at Leuven. In religion he took the name Charles.

As a friar, Charles gained a reputation for piety, learning and modesty. He became knowledgeable in theological and biblical studies, and in what time he had available beyond his religious duties, he studied the history of the order he had joined. There were some suggestions of making him a bishop, or even a cardinal, but he rejected all such proposals. In 1623 Archduchess Isabella instituted an annual Lenten Forty Hours' Devotion in the court chapel in Brussels, which Fr Charles preached to great acclaim in 1624.

Fr Charles himself designed the Capuchin house in Tervuren (1627-1628) and the Capuchin church in Brussels (1651-1652). The house in Tervuren was built on land granted by Isabella, surrounded with ponds and groves (now part of the Sonian Forest). At the end of the garden there was a little retreat house for Isabella's own use. The church in Brussels was subsidised by Fr Charles's brother, Philippe, Duke of Aarschot, and by the city of Brussels. The foundation stone was laid by Archduke Leopold Wilhelm of Austria on 20 March 1651, and the church was dedicated by Jacobus de la Torre on 14 July 1652. In 1650, when in Rome for the general chapter of the Capuchin order, Fr Charles had obtained from Pope Innocent X several corpses of martyrs recovered from the Roman catacombs. On 22 July 1652 these were ceremonially deposited in the new church.

Fr Charles died at the Capuchin house in Brussels on 5 June 1669 and was buried under the floor of the chapter house.

== Writings ==
- Flores Seraphici, containing biographies of eminent Capuchins from 1525 to 1612 (Cologne, 2 vols., 1640) Reprinted Antwerp, 1640; Milan, 1648.
- Clypeus Seraphicus (Cologne, 1643), a defence of Boverius's Annales Capucinorum.
