= Henri-Joseph Rega =

Professor

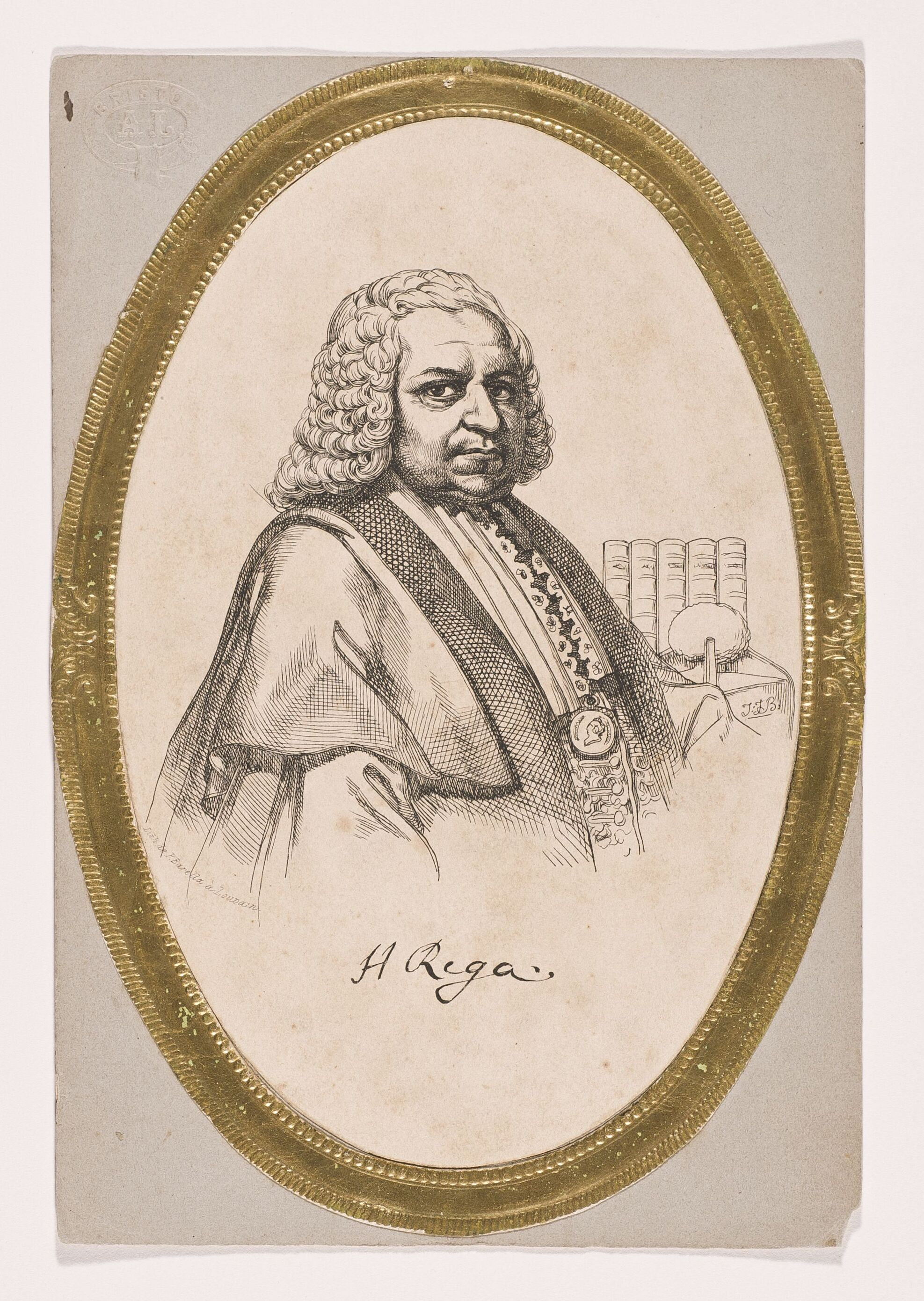
H.J. Rega

Henri-Joseph Rega (1690–1754) was a professor of medicine and rector of Leuven University, in the Habsburg Netherlands, where he established a botanical garden, laboratories for chemistry and physics, and an anatomical theatre, as well as adding a new wing to the University Hall (originally Leuven's medieval cloth hall).

== Life ==
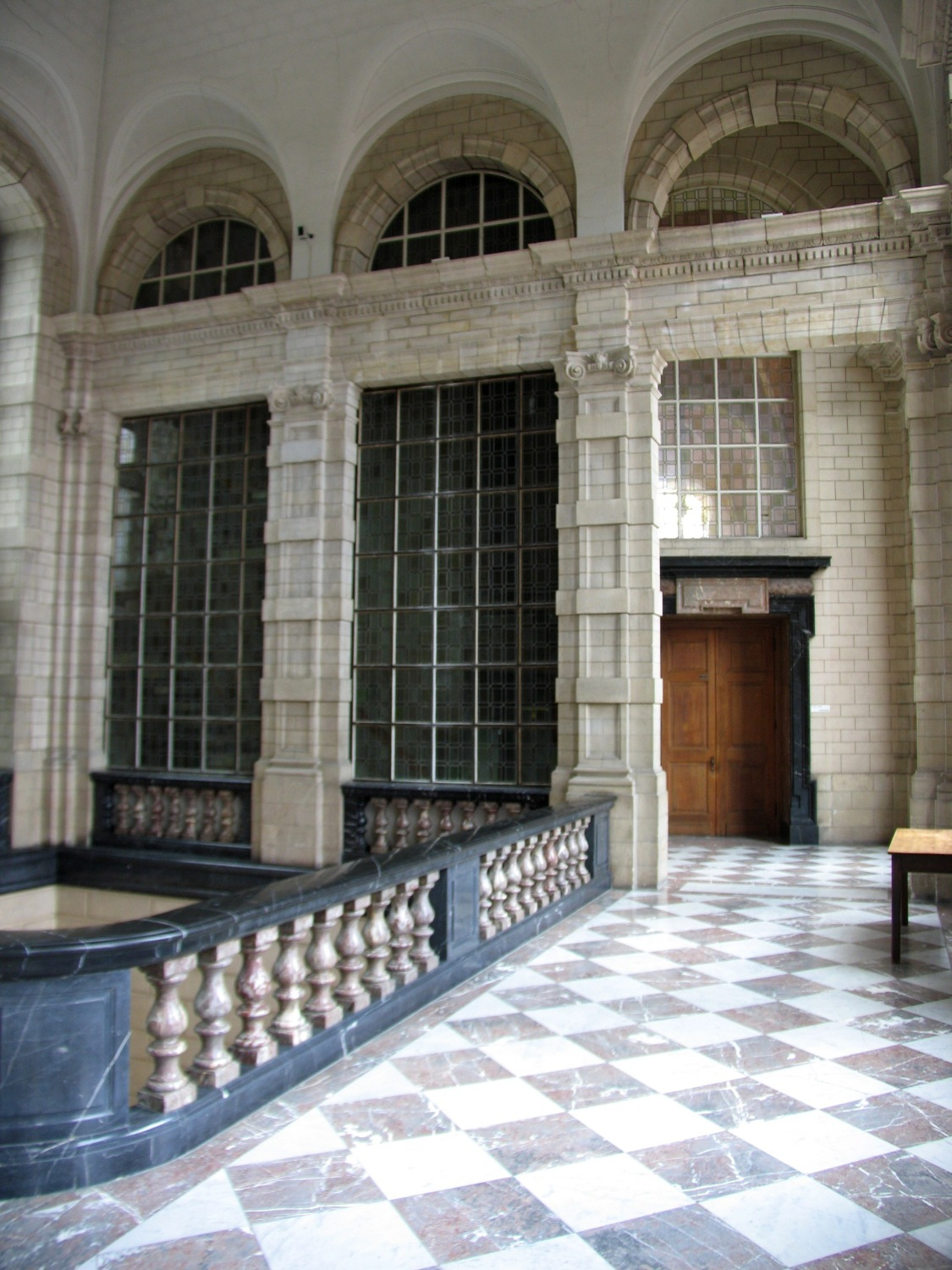
The main staircase in the "Rega Wing" of the University Hall in Leuven

Rega was born in Leuven on 26 April 1690. His parents ran a bleachworks on a branch of the Dijle on the edge of the town. He matriculated at the University of Leuven in 1707, aged 17, and graduated Licentiate of Medicine in 1712. The university sent him to Paris for further studies, and on his return in 1716 he was appointed professor of Chemistry. He graduated Doctor of Medicine on 22 February 1718, and in the same year began to teach Anatomy instead of Chemistry. In 1719 he was appointed Professor of Medicine and also began his first of several terms as rector of the university. One of his first priorities as rector was to commission a new wing on the University Hall, which was then used for medical lectures and demonstrations. The first stone was laid on 22 April 1723, and the new wing was first taken into use on 14 March 1725.

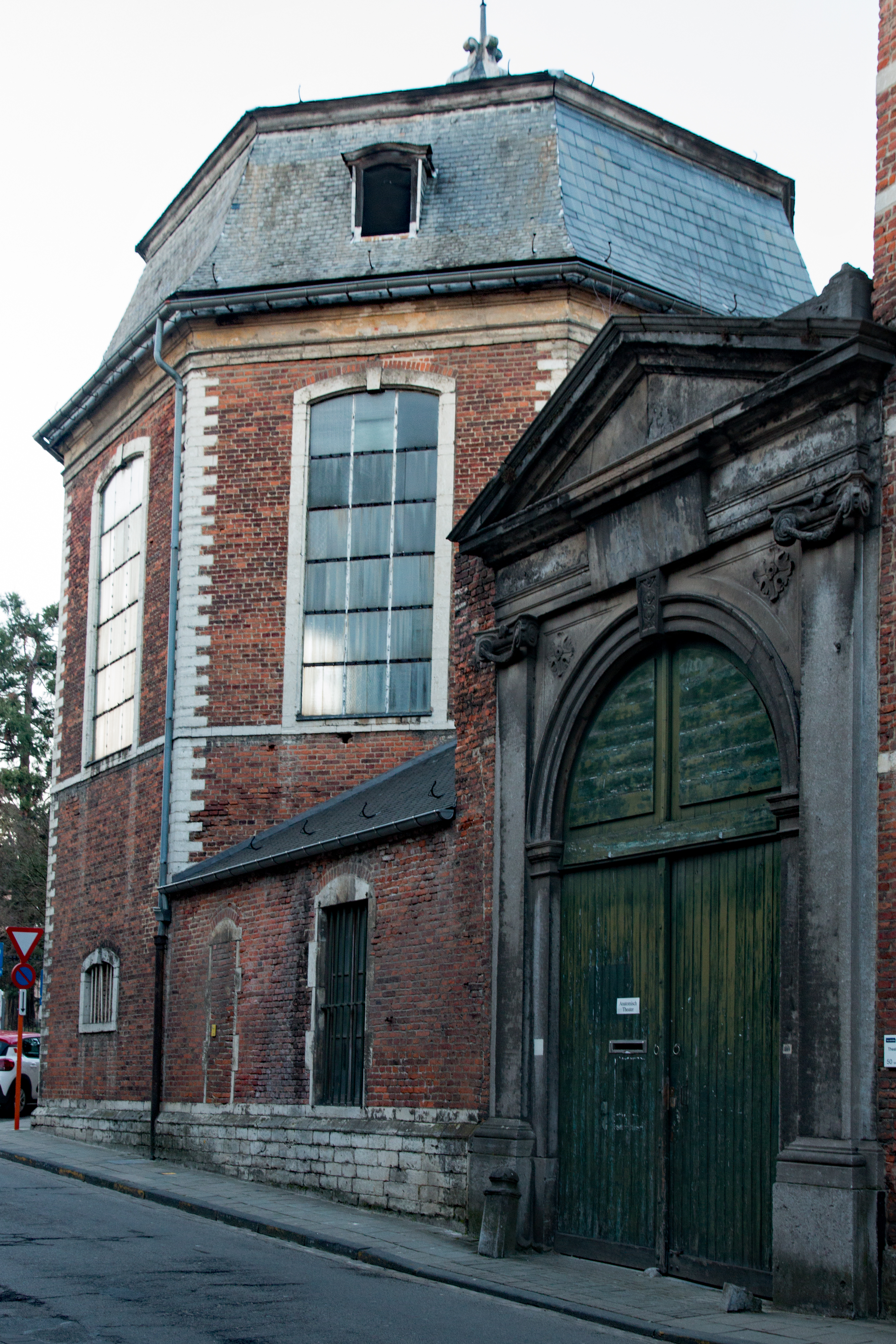
The anatomical theatre and the entrance to the botanical garden established in Leuven by Rega

In 1738, he established Leuven's botanical garden, and in 1744 the university's anatomical theatre.

Rega treated numerous wealthy patients in private practice, including Archduchess Maria Elisabeth of Austria, Governess-General of the Austrian Netherlands, who became a generous patron to him and gave him a gem-encrusted medal bearing her likeness. In 1740 he undertook a study of the healthful properties of mineral water from the estate of her summer residence in Mariemont (the site of the current Musée royal de Mariemont). His wealth enabled him to purchase a country estate of his own, and a fine town house in Leuven. The former is now the site of a 19th-century country house, Regahof, and the latter (at Parijsstraat 74 in Leuven) is a listed building known as "Hotel Rega".

In 1745, in Brussels, Rega treated Maurice de Saxe, the leader of an invading French army during the War of the Austrian Succession. The following year, after the civic militia of Leuven had fired upon French troops who had tried to force access to the town, Maurice threatened Leuven with bombardment. Rega rode through enemy lines in his coach to successfully appeal to him not to carry out the threat.

Since 1733, criminals executed in Brussels had been taken to the dissection chamber of the college of surgeons in Brussels Town Hall. In 1752, the then-governor, Prince Charles Alexander of Lorraine, decreed that the bodies of executed criminals be transferred to the Faculty of Medicine in Leuven for dissection in Rega's anatomical theatre.

Rega died in Leuven on 22 July 1754. He had been a book collector, and after his death his immense library was auctioned off over a period of three weeks. He bequeathed the gem-encrusted medal that Archduchess Maria Elisabeth had given him to St. Peter's Church, Leuven, his parish church.

== Writings ==
- De Sympathia, seu Consensu partium corporis humani, ac potissimum ventriculi, in statu morboso. Haarlem: Mathias van Lee. 1721.
- De Urinis tractatus duo. Leuven: Martinus van Overbeke. 1733.
- Accurata medendi methodus quantum fieri potest ab omni hypothesi abstracta, in 3 partes divisa pathologiam universalem, particularem et therapicam. Leuven: Martinus von Overbeke. 1737.
- Dissertatio medica de aquis mineralibus iisque saluberrimis tam ad conservandam quam restaurandam valetudinem Fontis Marimontensis. Leuven: Martinus van Overbeke. 1740.
- Dissertatio medico-chymica qua demonstratur sanguinem humanum nullo acido vitiari: accedit appendix. Leuven: Martinus Van Overbeke. 1744.
