= University Hall, Leuven =

Building in Leuven, Belgium

Coordinates: 50.8779°N 4.7005°E

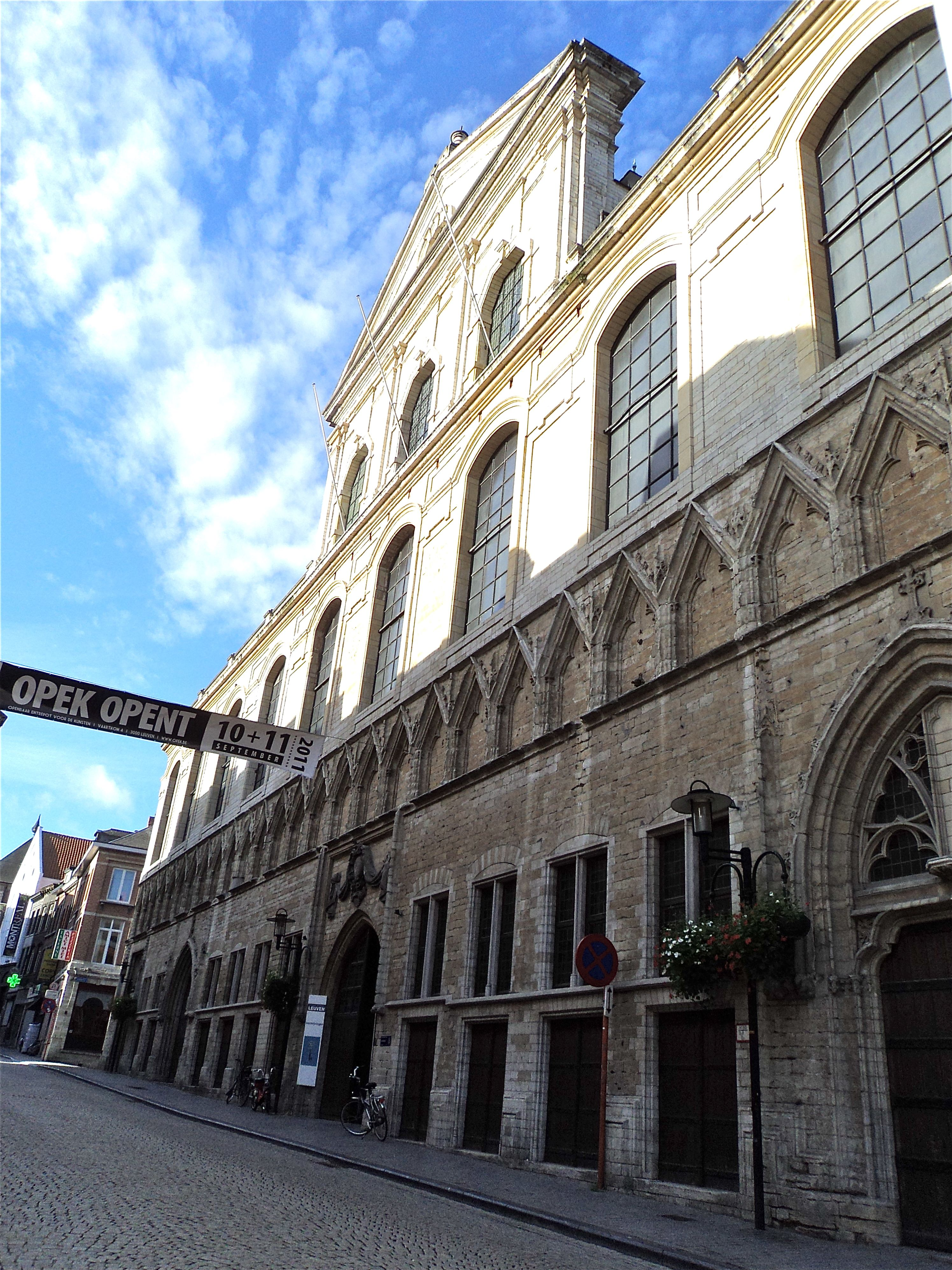
University Hall, Leuven

University Hall (Dutch: Universiteitshal) in Leuven, Belgium, is a medieval cloth hall with 17th and 18th-century extensions that is now the main administrative building of KU Leuven. Heavily damaged during the Sack of Leuven in August 1914, the building was restored 1921–1926. It has been a listed building since 26 November 1942, and protected built heritage since 14 September 2009. The building fills most of a city block, with entrances on three of the surrounding streets at Krakenstraat 2, Naamsestraat 22, and Oude Markt 13.

== History ==
Work on the oldest parts of the building began on 11 April 1317, with the aim of replacing the 12th-century cloth hall, which had become too small after a rapid expansion of the city's cloth trade around 1300. The builders were Jan Stevens, Arnout Hore and Goert Raes.

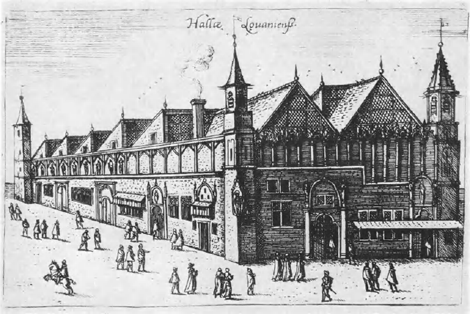
The University Hall in 1610

The University of Leuven, founded in December 1425, began to occupy the building in 1431, although initially sharing it with some of the town's guilds and with the city armoury. In the late 17th century, the university sued the city of Leuven before the Privy Council of the Habsburg Netherlands to repair the building, and a settlement was reached on 28 May 1679 by which the city relinquished ownership of the building to the university, absolving itself of further responsibility for repairs. The university in return undertook to build a new guild house for the guilds which had been established in the cloth hall. On 18 June 1680, work started on an entirely new upper floor, which after completion in 1690 housed teaching spaces and the university library. A Baroque cartouche was added above the main entrance with the inscription from the Book of Proverbs (9:1), Sapientia aedificavit sibi domum ("Wisdom has built herself a house").

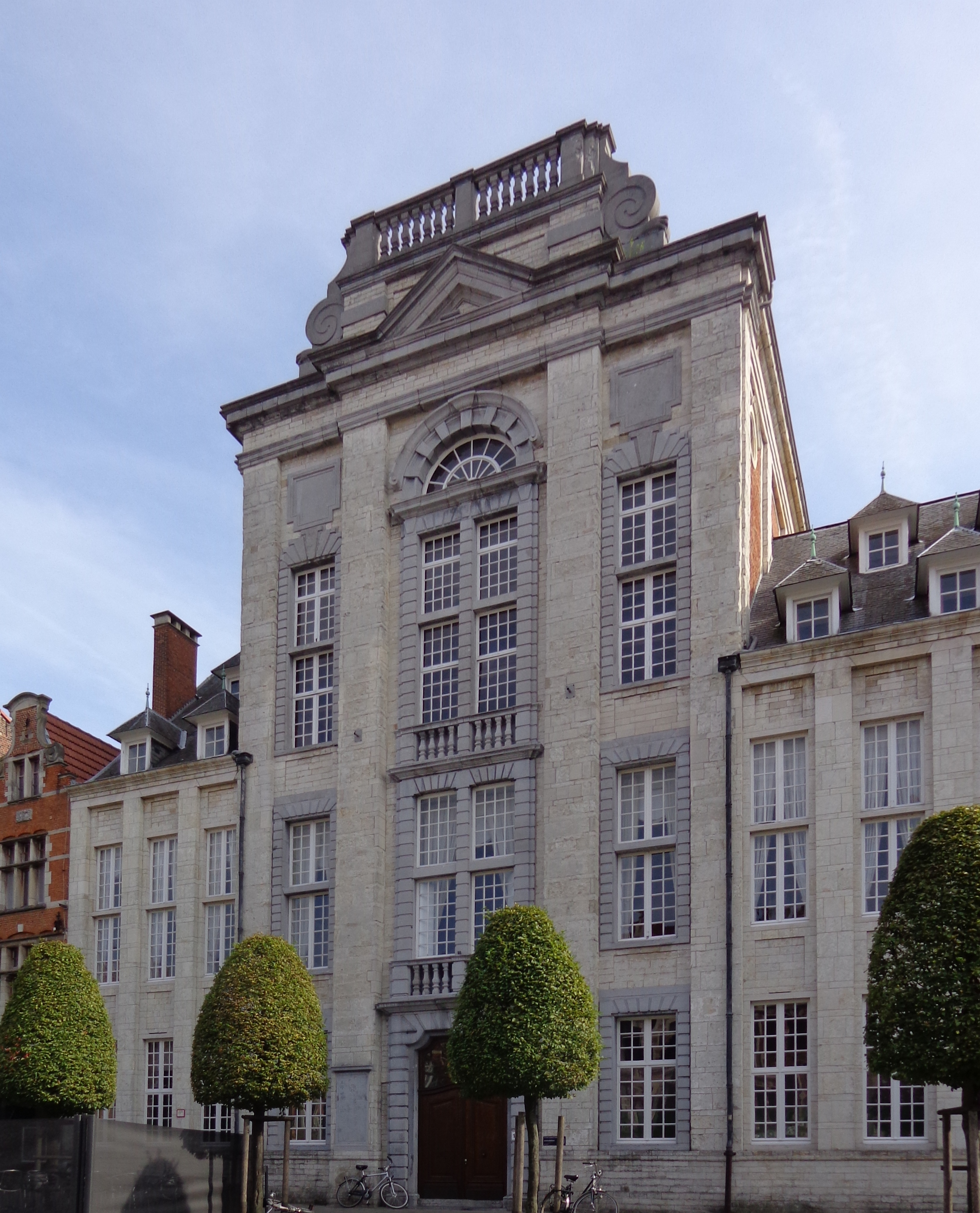
Rega's 18th-century extension

In 1719, Rector Henri-Joseph Rega commissioned the addition of a new wing. Work started on 22 April 1723, and the new wing was inaugurated on 14 March 1725.

After the university was closed and its assets seized in 1797, University Hall became state property. An imperial decree of 12 December 1805 returned the former University Hall to the city, which housed the city library in part of the building and rented the rest out to private businesses, including a butcher's shop, a tavern and a theatre. Under the United Kingdom of the Netherlands (1815–1830), a State University of Leuven was established, with a royal order of 25 September 1816 obliging the city to vacate all former university buildings and make them available to the new university. The State University was active from 1817 to 1835.

In 1835, the Catholic University of Belgium, founded the previous year in Mechelen, relocated to Leuven and took the name Catholic University of Leuven. One of the attractions of the move was the city's offer to lease University Hall. Initially used for faculty offices and teaching, the building was gradually given over entirely to the library as new faculty buildings and lecture theatres became available.

=== Library ===
The medieval university had a collegiate structure, but in the early 17th century, a central university library began to take shape with the bequests of the libraries of Laurentius Beyerlinck, a canon of Antwerp Cathedral, in 1627, and of Professor of Medicine Jacobus Romanus in 1637. The university library was housed in University Hall until 1797, when most of the holdings were seized and transported to Brussels and Paris, and again from 1835 until 1914.

=== August 1914 ===
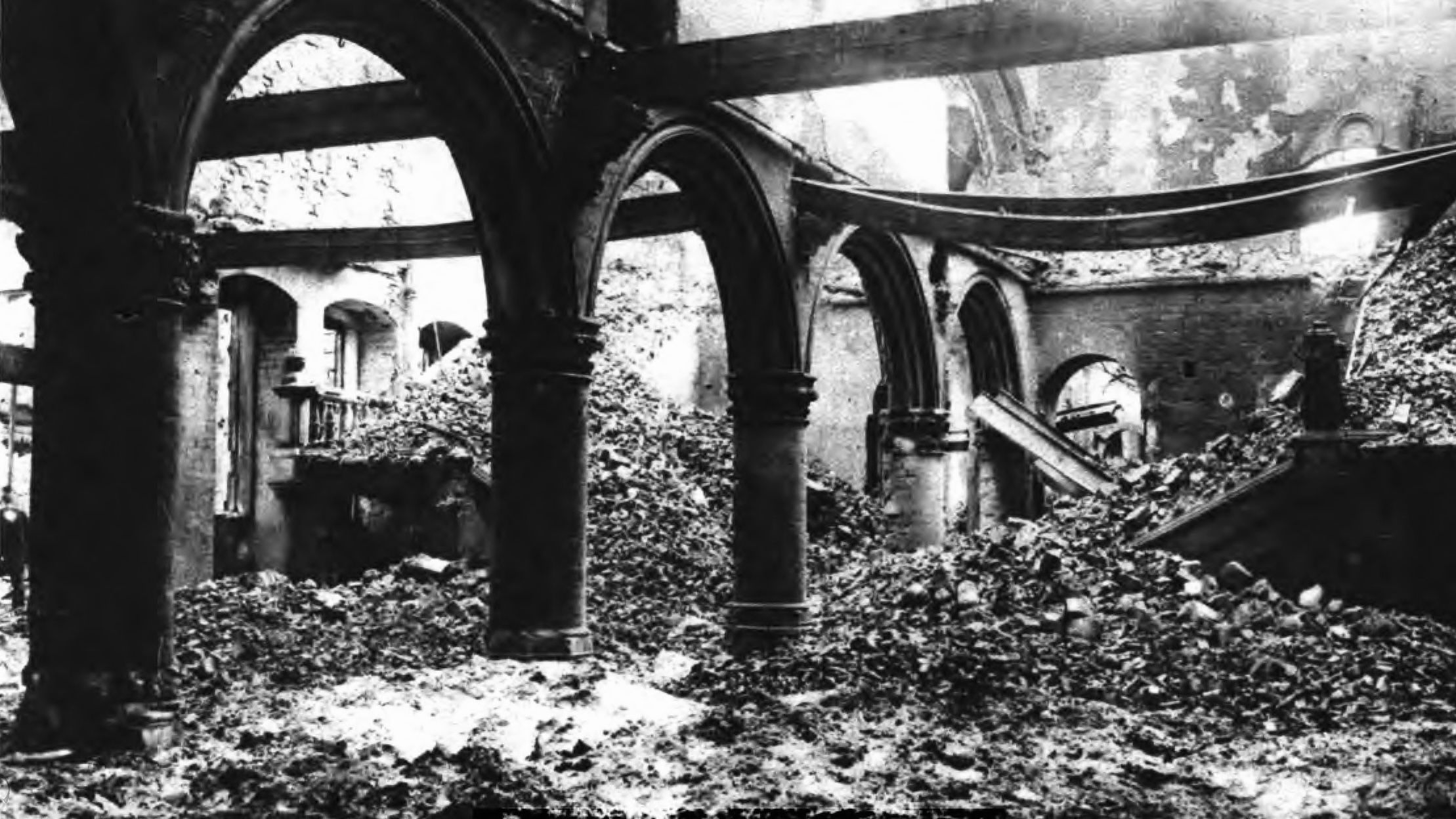
The ruins of the university library after it was burned by the German army in 1914

In the night of 25–26 August 1914, invading German forces deliberately set fire to the university library, using petrol and incendiary pastilles. Within ten hours, the library and its collection was virtually destroyed. The fire continued to burn for several days. Approximately 230,000 volumes were lost in the destruction, including Gothic and Renaissance manuscripts, a collection of 750 medieval manuscripts, and more than 1,000 incunabula (books printed before 1501). Only the outer walls of University Hall remained standing. The destruction of the library shocked the world, with the Daily Chronicle describing it as war not only against civilians but also against "posterity to the utmost generation." Only urgent stabilisation works could be carried out during the war, and research on the structures that the fire had laid bare was carried out by Professor of Architecture, Raymond Lemaire.

=== University offices ===
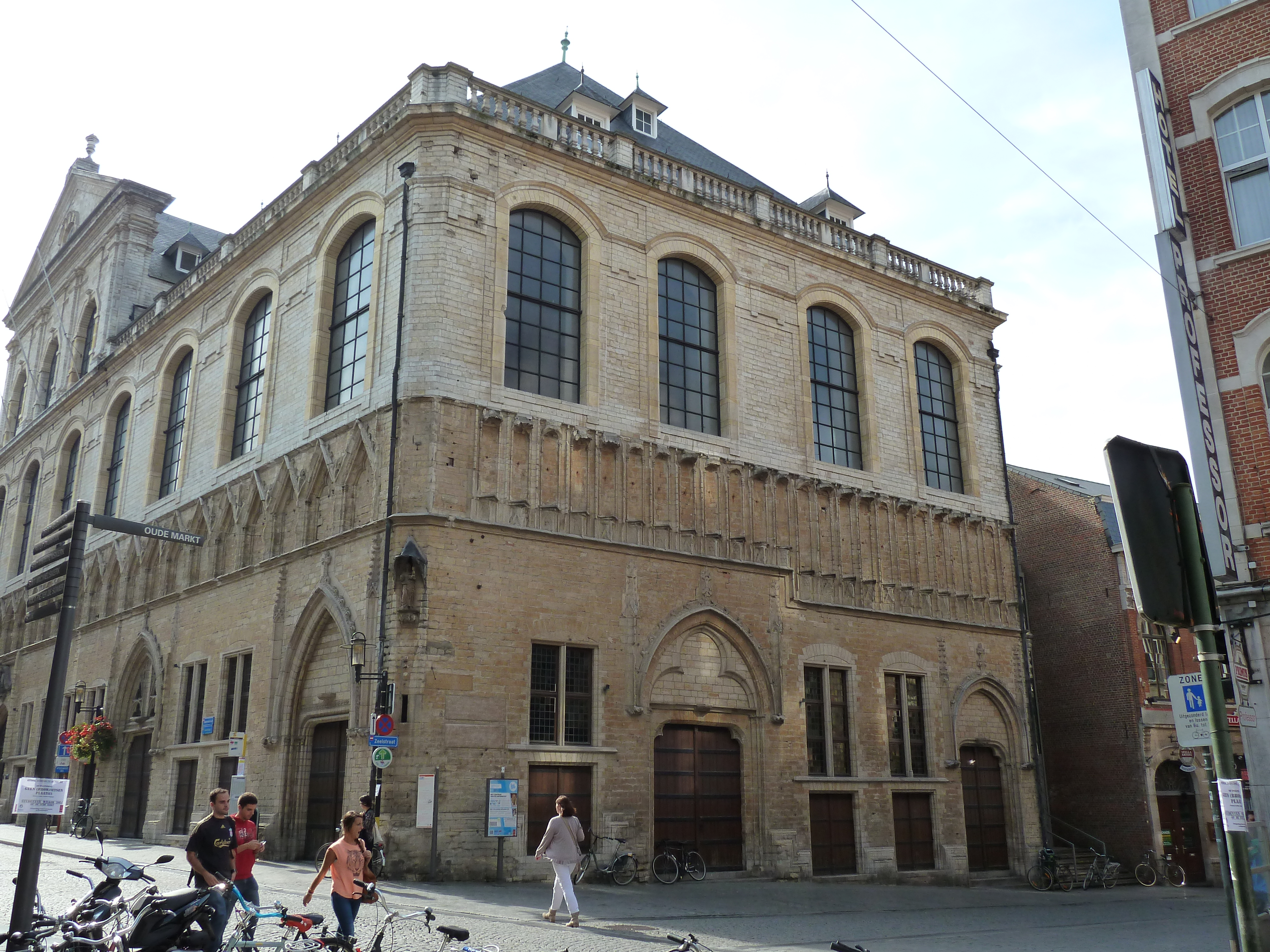
The University Hall in the early 21st century

After the war, the building was returned to the university on a 99-year lease. Between 1921 and 1926, renovation works were undertaken to return the building to its pre-war appearance. Works were completed on 20 October 1926, and the restored building was inaugurated on 28 June 1927. A new, dedicated University Library was built on the square now known as Ladeuzeplein, and University Hall housed a museum and the central offices of the rector and staff. What had been the library reading room became a hall for the conducting of public doctoral vivas. In the 1970s, the museum was rehoused and the resulting spaces refurbished for formal receptions. Further minor restoration works were carried out in the 1980s, in part for a papal visit by John Paul II in 1985.
