= Scholaster =

Head of an ecclesiastical school

A scholaster, from the Latin scholasticus (schoolmaster), or magister scholarum, was the head of an ecclesiastical school, typically a cathedral school, monastic school, or the school of a collegiate church, in medieval and early-modern Europe. Depending on the size of the school and the status of the institution to which it was attached, the scholaster might be the only teacher, the head of a considerable educational establishment, or have oversight over all the schools in their city or territory. The scholaster might be a dignitary in a cathedral or collegiate chapter, alongside the provost, dean, cantor, succentor, precentor, archdeacon, treasurer, cellarer, sacristan or almoner. It was not unknown for a scholaster to take the revenues of the post and deputise somebody else to carry out any teaching work involved.

== See also ==
- Licentiate (degree) § History
