= List of bishops and prince-bishops of Liège =

This is a list of the bishops and prince-bishops of Liège. It includes the bishops of the Roman Catholic Diocese of Liège and its predecessor see of Tongeren and Maastricht. From 972 to 1795, the bishops of Liège also ruled a lordship (not co-extensive with their diocese) known as the Prince-Bishopric of Liège.

== Bishops of Tongeren-Maastricht-Liège, 315–971 ==
=== See in Tongeren (4th-century) ===
- St. Maternus of Tongeren (?) (c. 315)
- Saint Servatius (342–384)

=== See in Maastricht (380s? to 718) ===
- Falco (c. 498–c. 512)
- Domitian (?–560)
- Saint Monulphus (549–588)
- Saint Gondulphus (589–614)
- Saint Ebregise ? (614–627)
- Saint John I Agnus (627–647)
- Saint Amand (647–650)
- Saint Remaclus (652–662)
- Saint Theodard (662–669)
- Saint Lambert, patron saint of the diocese (669–705 or later)
- Saint Hubert of Liège, patron saint of the city (705 or before – 727)

=== See in Maastricht and/or Liège (718 to 810) ===
- Floribert of Liège (727–736 or 738)
- Fulcaire (736 or 738–769)
- Agilfride (769–787)
- Gerbald (787–809)
- Walcaud (809–831)

=== See in Liège (810 to 972) ===
- Pirard (831 – 838 or 840)
- Hartgar (838 or 840 – 857)
- Franco (858–901)
- Stephen (901–920)
- Richer (920–945)
- Hugh I (945–947)
- Farabert (947–953)
- Rathier (953–955)
- Baldrick I (955–959)
- Eraclus (Eraclius, Evraclus) (959–971)

== Prince-bishops of Liège, 972–1794 ==
- Notger (972–1008; founder of the Principality of Liège)
- Baldrick II (1008–1018)
- Wolbodo (1018–1021)
- Durandus (1021–1025)
- Reginard (1025–1037)
- Nithard (1037–1042)
- Wazo (1042–1048)
- Theodwin (1048–1075)
- Henry of Verdun (1075–1091)
- Otbert (1091–1119)
- Frederick of Namur (1119–1121)
- Albero I of Leuven (1122–1128)
- Alexander I (1128–1135)
- Albero II of Chiny-Namur (1135–1145)
- Henry II of Leez (1145–1164)
- Alexander II (1164–1167)
- Rudolf of Zähringen (1167–1191)
- Saint Albert of Leuven (1191–1192)
- Lothaire of Hochstaden (1192–1193)
- Simon of Limbourg (1193–1195)
- Albert of Cuyck (1195–1200)
- Hugh of Pierrepont (1200–1229)
- John of Eppes (1229–1238)
- William of Savoy (1238–1239)
- Robert of Thourotte (1240–1246)
- Henry of Guelders (1247–1274)
- John of Enghien (1274–1281)
  - Bouchard d'Avesnes (1281–1282), elect
  - William of Auvergne (1281–1282), elect
- John of Flanders (1282–1291)
- Hugh of Chalon (1295–1301)
- Adolph of Waldeck (1301–1302)
- Thibaut of Bar (1302–1312)
- Adolph de la Marck (1313–1344)
- Englebert de la Marck (1345–1364)
- John of Arkel (1364–1378)
- Arnold of Horne (1378–1389)
- John of Bavaria (1389–1418)
- John of Walenrode (1418–1419)
- John of Heinsberg (1419–1455)
- Louis of Bourbon (1456–1482)
- John of Hornes (1484–1505)
- Érard de La Marck (1505–1538)
- Corneille of Berghes (1538–1544)
- George of Austria (1544–1557)
- Robert of Berghes (1557–1564)
- Gerard of Grœsbeek (1564–1580)
- Ernest of Bavaria (1581–1612)
- Ferdinand of Bavaria (1612–1650)
- Maximilian Henry of Bavaria (1650–1688)
- John Louis of Elderen (1688–1694)
- Joseph Clemens of Bavaria (1694–1723)
- Georges-Louis de Berghes (1724–1743)
- Jean-Théodore of Bavaria (1744–1763)
- Charles-Nicolas d'Oultremont (1763–1771)
- François-Charles de Velbruck (1772–1784)
- César-Constantin-François de Hoensbroeck (1784–1792)
- François-Antoine-Marie de Méan (18 August 1792 – 20 July 1794)

== Bishops of Liège, 1802–present ==
- Jean-Évangéliste Zäpfel (1802–1808)
- vacancy (1808–1829)
- Corneille Richard Antoine van Bommel (1829–1852)
- Theodor Joseph de Montpellier (1852–1879)
- Victor Joseph Doutreloux (1879–1901)
- Martin-Hubert Rutten (1902–1927)
- Louis-Joseph Kerkhofs (1927–1961)
- Guillaume Marie van Zuylen (1961–1986)
- Albert Houssiau (1986–2001)
- Aloys Jousten (2001–2013)
- Jean-Pierre Delville, consecrated 14 July 2013

== See also ==
- Prince-Bishopric of Liège
