= Louis-Joseph Kerkhofs =

Belgian bishop (1878-1962)

- Bishop Emeritus of Liège
- Province: Mechelen–Brussels
- Metropolis: Mechelen–Brussels
- Diocese: Liège
- See: Liège
- Appointed: 18 December 1924 (Coadjutor)
- Installed: 17 July 1927
- Term ended: 7 December 1961
- Predecessor: Martin-Hubert Rutten
- Successor: Guillaume Marie van Zuylen
- Other post: Titular Bishop of Serrae (1961 - 1962)
- Previous post: Titular Bishop of Diocaesarea in Palaestina (1924 - 1927)

Orders
- Ordination: 22 September 1900
- Consecration: 11 February 1925 by Martin-Hubert Rutten
- Rank: Bishop

Personal details
- Born: 15 February 1878 Val-Meer, Riemst, Belgium
- Died: 31 December 1962 (aged 84) Liège, Belgium
- Motto: Quia ego servus
- Coat of arms

Louis-Joseph Kerkhofs, (15 February 1878 - 31 December 1962) was the Roman Catholic Bishop of Liège from 1927 - 1961.

== Life ==
Following his schooling in Peer, Louis-Joseph Kerkhofs studied at the Seminary in Hasselt and in Rome. On 22 September 1900, Kerkhof was ordained a Catholic Priest in Liège. In 1901 he became a professor at the minor seminary in Sint-Truiden. He took over the teaching of Dogmatics at the Major Seminary in Liège in 1917, and in 1922 was appointed Dean.

Pope Pius XI named him Titular Bishop of Diocaesarea in Palaestina and Coadjutor bishop of Liège on 18 December 1924. He was consecrated bishop by Martin-Hubert Rutten on 11 February of the following year, and the Co-Consecrators were Thomas Louis Heylen, Bishop of Namur, und Louis Joseph Legraive, Auxiliary Bishop in Mechelen–Brussels. With the death of Bishop Rutten on 17 July 1927, Kerkhofs succeeded him as the 88th Bishop of Liège. In 1942, he permitted the first deployment of a Worker-priest in a factory.

During the Second World War, Kerkofs protected numerous Jews from the Gestapo. He hid the Chief Rabbi Solomon Ullmann in the episcopal palace, as well as hiding the Rabbi of Liège and his family in a monastery in Huy. Around 400 children and adults were housed and saved with the help of the businessman Max-Albert Van den Berg and the lawyer Guy Wolf in Banneux. For this work he received the Righteous Among the Nations honour posthumously in 1981.

On 7 December 1961 Pope John XXIII accepted his resignation from the Diocese of Liège and named him Titular Bishop of Serrae.

== Marian Apparition in Banneux ==
The twelve year old Mariette Beco claimed that, from the beginning of 1922, the Virgin Mary appeared to her as "Our Lady of the Poor". In 1942, Kerkhofs gave the recognition needed to make Banneux a particular Marian Shrine, and in 1949 he confirmed the supernatural nature of the Marian apparitions, which were later also recognised by the Vatican in 1952.
