= Théodore de Montpellier =

Belgian Catholic bishop (1807–1879)

Théodore Alexis Joseph de Montpellier
- Bishop of Liège
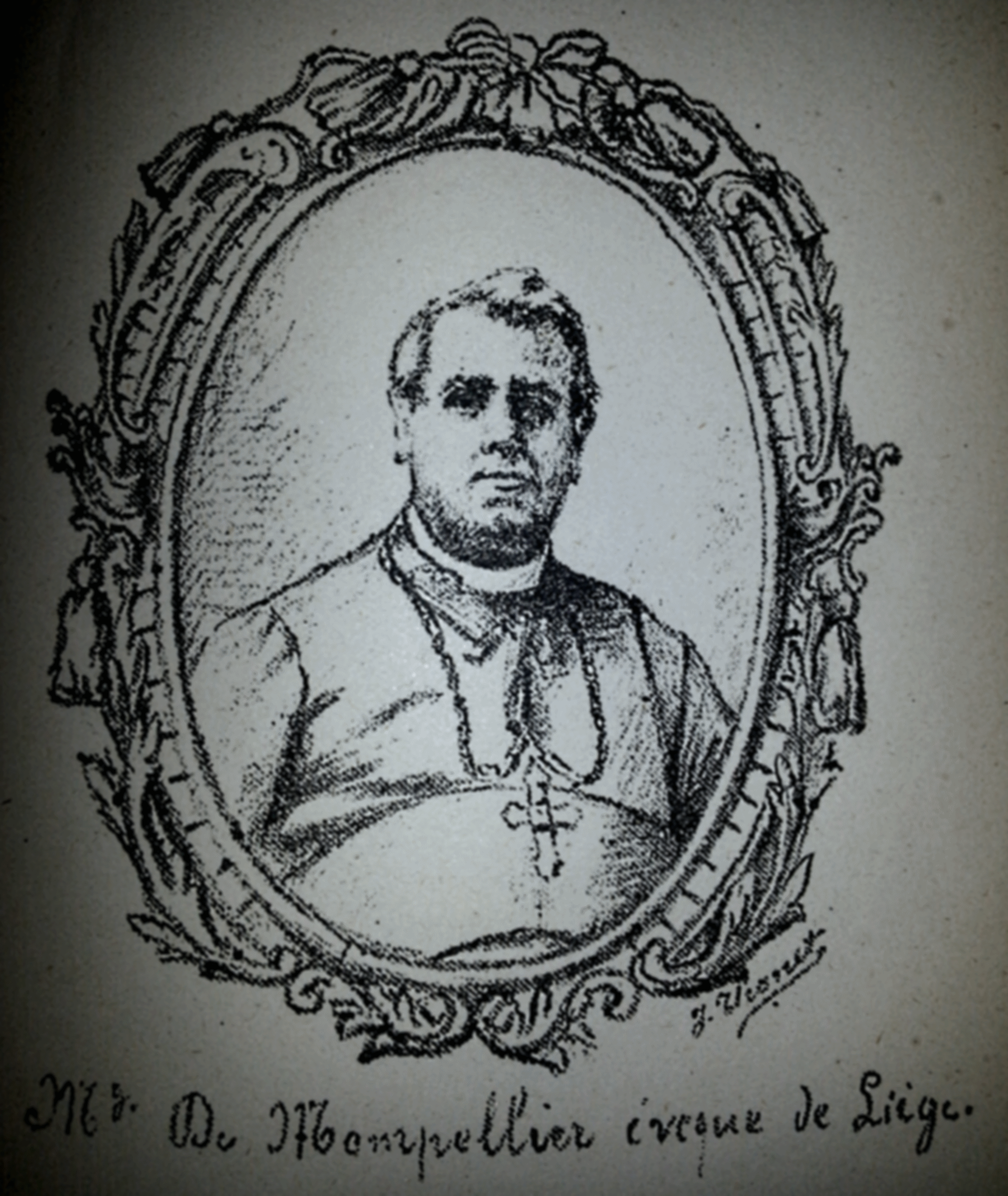
- Diocese: Liège
- See: St Paul's Cathedral
- In office: 1852–1879
- Predecessor: Cornelius van Bommel
- Successor: Victor Joseph Doutreloux

Orders
- Ordination: 7 September 1833 by Carlo Odescalchi
- Consecration: 7 November 1852 by Engelbert Sterckx, Nicolas-Joseph Dehesselle, Jean-Baptiste Malou

Personal details
- Born: 7 May 1807 Vedrin, Sambre-et-Meuse, First French Empire
- Died: 24 August 1879 (aged 72) Liège, Province of Liège, Belgium
- Education: Bishop's College, Aalst; Jesuit College, Amiens
- Motto: Omnibus omnia factus sum, ut omnes salvos faciam (1 Corinthians 9:22)

Théodore Alexis Joseph de Montpellier (1807–1879) was the 85th bishop of Liège in Belgium.

== Life ==
Montpellier was born in the castle at Vedrin on 7 May 1807. His secondary education was at the Bishop's College in Aalst and the Jesuit College in Amiens. He then studied Theology in Rome, where he was ordained to the priesthood on 7 September 1833.

Returning to the diocese of Namur, he was in considerable demand as a retreat master for religious congregations and societies. The bishop of Namur, Nicolas-Joseph Dehesselle, appointed him to establish the first Catholic normal school in modern Belgium, at Malonne. Montpellier was also one of the founders of the newspaper L'Ami de l'ordre. On 27 February 1843, he was appointed inspector of primary schools for the diocese of Namur.

On 27 September 1852, Pope Pius IX confirmed Montpellier's appointment as bishop of Liège in succession to his recently deceased friend, Cornelius van Bommel. He was consecrated on 7 November.

As bishop, Montpellier encouraged the foundation of hospices, hospitals and orphanages; the building of new parish churches (consecrating 88 in person); and the establishment in his diocese of many religious orders and congregations, especially those running schools. He also helped fund the establishment of a school of mining, an anatomical theatre and a pedagogical institute at the Catholic University of Leuven. He frequently preached Advent and Lenten missions in the major churches of his diocese, and led annual retreats for his clergy. He actively opposed Liberal legislation to suppress religious processions and funerals, reallocate the income of Catholic parishes and schools, and subject seminarians and clergymen to military conscription. His zeal led Pope Pius IX to describe him as "a fire burning on the altar for God and for the Church". He died in Liège on 24 August 1879.

== Publications ==
- Lettre pastorale (Liège, Dessain, 1852)
- Pieux souvenirs de M. le comte d'Oultremont de Warfusée, dédiés à ses enfants (Liège, Dessain, 1855)
- Instruction pastorale sur la sépulture chrétienne (Liège, Dessain, 1857)
- Instruction pastorale adressée au clergé et aux fidèles de son diocèse, sur l'autorité temporelle de N. S. P. le Pape, et sur l'administration des Etats pontificaux, et mandement ordonnant des prières pour le Souverain Pontife (Liège, Dessain, 1859)
- Instruction pastorale sur l'éducation chrétienne (Liège, Dessain, 1862)
- Oraison funèbre de Mgr Jean-Baptiste Malou, évêque de Bruges, prononcée en l'église cathédrale de Bruges le 12 avril 1864 (Brussels, Goemare, 1864)
- Défense des droits de Dieu, de l'Eglise catholique et de ses membres, contre le projet de loi sur le temporel des cultes, déposé à la Chambre des représentants de Belgique le 17 novembre 1864 (Liège, Dessain, 1865)
- Mandements, lettres pastorales, circulaires et instructions (2 vols, Liège, Dessain, 1868)
- Le concile oecuménique du Vatican. Instruction pastorale (Liège, Dessain, 1869)
- Recours à S.M. le Roi, au sujet des budgets des fabriques d'églises soumis à l'approbation de la députation permanente de Liége (Liège, Demarteau, 1871)
- Instruction pastorale sur le cimetière catholique (Liège, Dessain, 1874)
- Cinquantième anniversaire de la consécration épiscopale de N. S. P. le Pape Pie IX (3 juin 1827-1877). Lettre pastorale (Liège, Dessain, 1877)
- Lettre pastorale au clergé du diocèse à l'occasion des élections législatives du 11 juin 1878 (Liège, Demarteau, 1878)
