= Cornelius Richard Anton van Bommel =

Dutch bishop (1790-1852)

Corneille Richard Antoine van Bommel
- Bishop of Liège
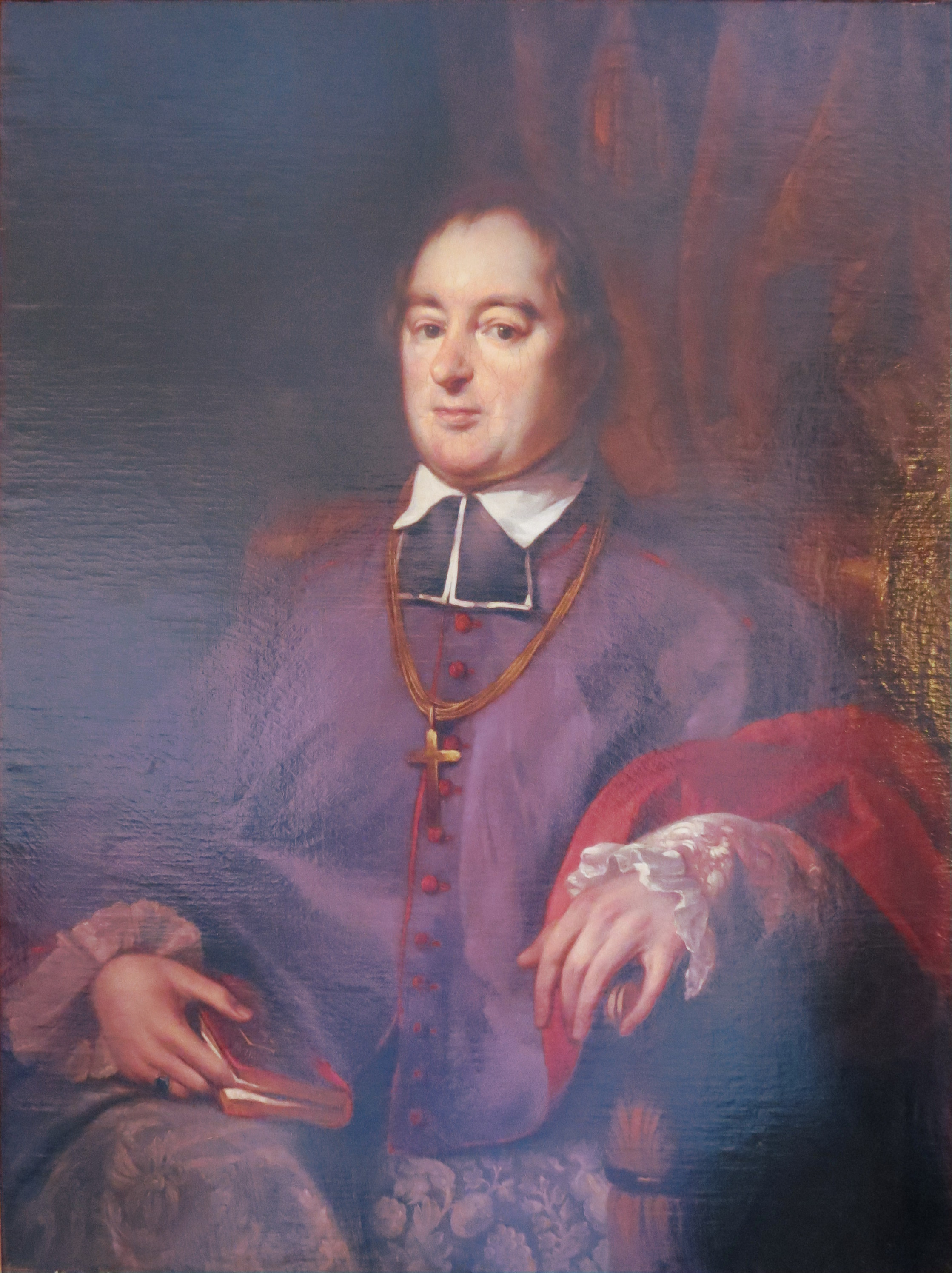
- Portrait in Rolduc Abbey
- Diocese: Liège
- See: St Paul's Cathedral
- In office: 1829–1852
- Predecessor: vacant 1808–1829
- Successor: Theodor Joseph de Montpellier

Orders
- Ordination: 1816 by Kaspar Droste zu Vischering
- Consecration: 15 November 1829

Personal details
- Born: 5 April 1790 Leiden, County of Holland, Dutch Republic
- Died: 7 April 1852 (aged 62) Liège, Province of Liège, Belgium
- Education: Licentiate of Sacred Theology; University of Leuven
- Motto: Tempora nationum implentur

Cornelius Richard Anton van Bommel (5 April 1790, at Leiden – 7 April 1852) was a Dutch Bishop of Liège, Belgium, from 1829 until his death.

== Biography ==
Van Bommel was born in Leiden to a well-established commercial family. His mother was a French immigrant. Orphaned by the age of 13, he was educated at the college of Willingshegge near Münster, and later at the advanced school of Borght. Against strong opposition he entered the seminary of Münster and was ordained priest in 1816 by Bishop Kaspar Droste zu Vischering.

After ordination he returned to the Low Countries, where the United Kingdom of the Netherlands had recently been founded. There he founded a college for young men at Hageveld, near Haarlem. The college was closed in 1825 in consequence of the royal decree that subjected all educational institutions to State control. King William I of the Netherlands offered van Bommel the presidency of another college, but met with a firm refusal.

The Catholics and Liberals joined forces in opposing the arbitrary policy of the Government, and van Bommel took a prominent part in the agitation that forced the king to promulgate the Concordat concluded with Pope Leo XII. Under the provisions of the Concordat, van Bommel was nominated to the See of Liège, which had been vacant for over 20 years. He was consecrated on 15 November 1829. He took no active part in the revolution of 1830, but as Bishop of Liège he was forced to sever his connection with the Netherlands. He organized Liège seminary, revived Catholic elementary education, and it was upon his initiative that the Belgian bishops decided to found the Catholic University of Leuven.

Bishop van Bommel was a defender of the primacy of the Holy See, an opponent of Freemasonry, and an advocate of religious education. At the reorganization of public instruction in 1842, his educational views were put in force in those gymnasia and technical schools which the State maintained wholly or in part.

His writings comprise three volumes of Pastoral Letters, and a number of pamphlets on ecclesiastical and educational questions. He died in Liège on 7 April 1852.

Catholic Church titles
Preceded by vacant	Bishop of Liège; 1829–1852	Succeeded by Theodor Joseph de Montpellier
