= Martin-Hubert Rutten =

Early 20th century Bishop of Liège, Belgium

- Bishop of Liège
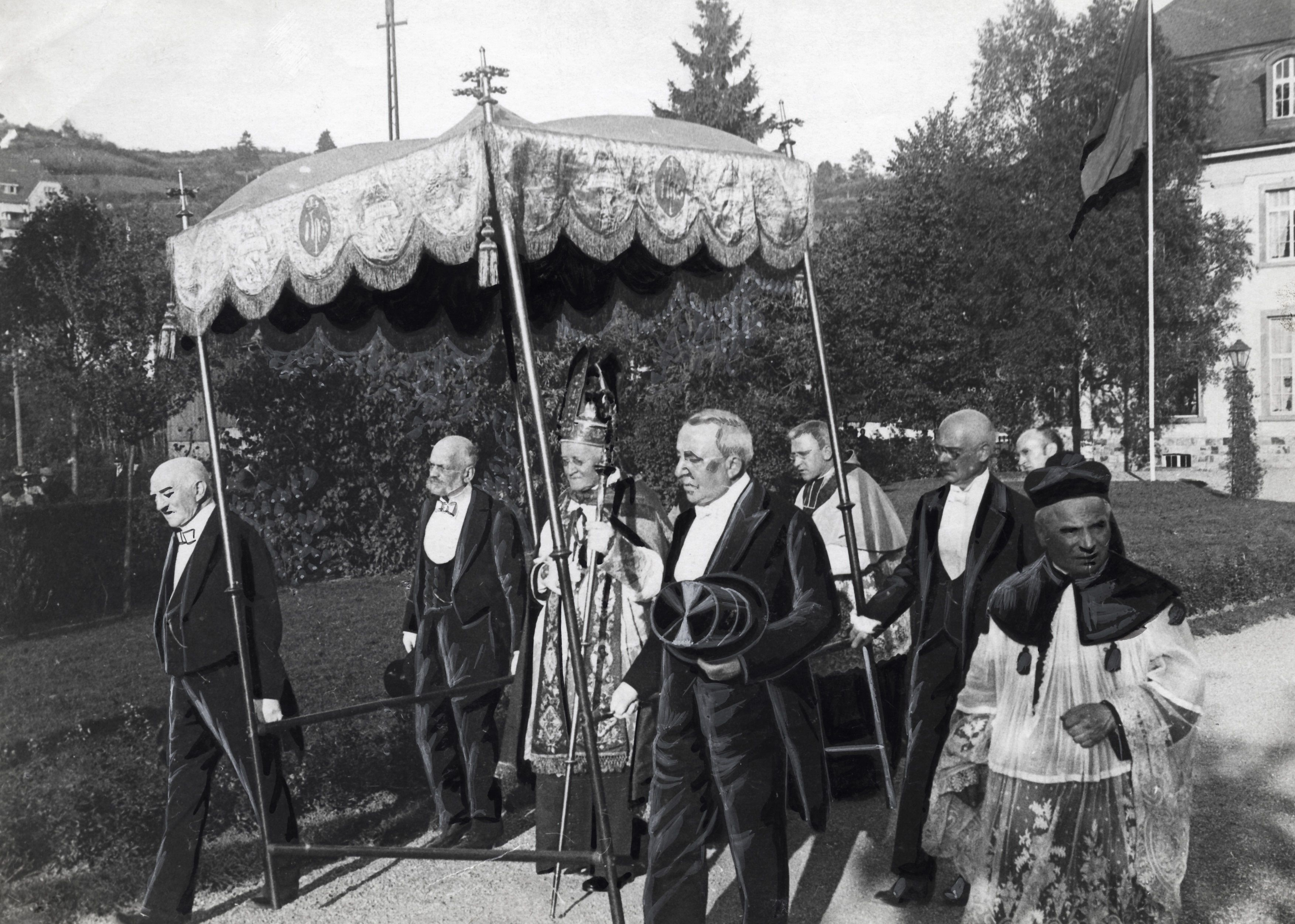
- Church: Catholic Church
- Diocese: Diocese of Liège
- See: St Paul's, Liège
- Predecessor: Victor Joseph Doutreloux
- Successor: Louis-Joseph Kerkhofs
- Previous post: Dean of the cathedral chapter in Liège

Orders
- Ordination: 28 April 1867
- Consecration: 6 June 1902

Personal details
- Born: 18 December 1841 Geistingen, Limburg Province, Belgium
- Died: 17 July 1927 (aged 85) Liège, Liège Province, Belgium
- Education: Diocesan Seminary of Liège
- Motto: Non recuso laborem

Martin-Hubert Rutten (1841–1927), was a bishop of Liège.

== Life ==
Rutten was born in Geistingen, in the Belgian province of Limburg, on 18 December 1841, and was educated at the minor seminary in Sint-Truiden and the Diocesan Seminary of Liège. He was ordained to the priesthood on 28 April 1867, and taught mathematics at the minor seminary of Saint-Roch (Ferneres) from 1868, becoming director of the school in 1873. In 1875, he was appointed an honorary canon, in 1878 rector of the minor seminary in Sint-Truiden, and in 1879 president of the diocesan seminary and vicar general of the Roman Catholic Diocese of Liège. In 1888, he became dean of the cathedral chapter in Liège, and on 26 August 1901 was named bishop. His appointment was supported by Leopold II of Belgium, who saw him as a man who would combat the growth of Christian democracy in Liège. Unlike his predecessor, he was opposed to the franchise extension and thought nobody under 30 should be allowed to vote. He was consecrated on 6 June 1902.

Rutten was from a Dutch-speaking family and inclined to flamingant ideas, thinking it a matter of pressing importance that ordinary people receive instruction in so far as possible in their native language. During the First School War, he interpreted live for Jean-Joseph Thonissen at a political rally in Limburg. He published two articles in Het Belfort, in 1887 and 1892, and addressed the Eucharistic Congress held at Hasselt in 1904 in Dutch. He protested against German atrocities and exactions during the German occupation of Belgium during World War I and condemned those who collaborated to obtain language concessions, but immediately after the end of the war, he decreed that the Catholic secondary schools in Limburg should switch to Dutch as the main medium of instruction.

In 1920 the territories of Eupen-Malmedy were removed from the Roman Catholic Archdiocese of Cologne and became the new Diocese of Eupen-Malmedy, united to the diocese of Liège. These territories became part of the Diocese of Liège in 1925.

Rutten died in Liège on 17 July 1927. Throughout his episcopate, he consecrated 120 churches and 24 chapels to bring the sacraments as close to the people as possible.

Catholic Church titles
Preceded by Victor Joseph Doutreloux	Bishop of Liège; 1902–1927	Succeeded by Louis-Joseph Kerkhofs
