= Victor Joseph Doutreloux =

Late 19th century Bishop of Liège, Belgium

- Bishop of Liège
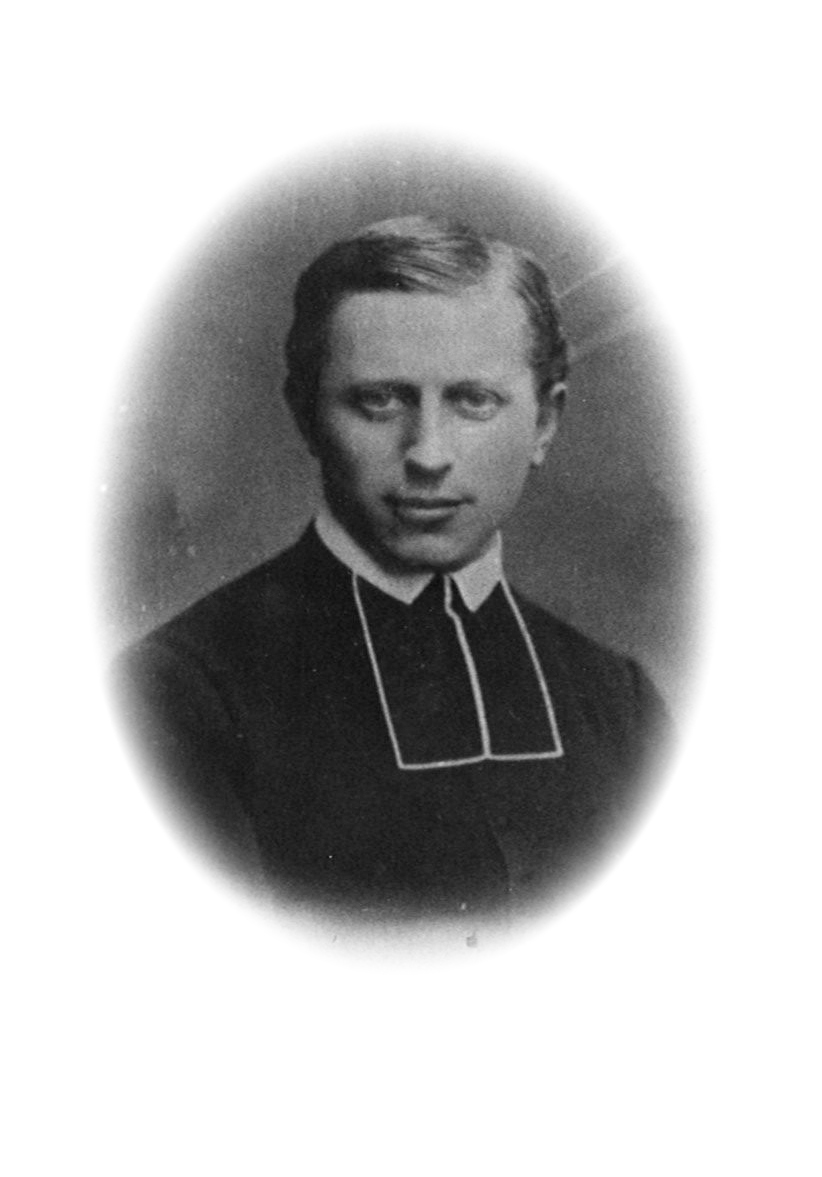
- Church: Catholic Church
- Diocese: Diocese of Liège
- See: St Paul's, Liège
- Installed: 24 August 1879
- Predecessor: Theodor Joseph de Montpellier
- Successor: Martin-Hubert Rutten
- Previous posts: Vicar general and coadjutor bishop of the diocese of Liège; President of the Diocesan Seminary of Liège

Orders
- Ordination: 1861
- Consecration: 5 July 1875

Personal details
- Born: 18 May 1837 Chênée, Liège Province, Belgium
- Died: 24 August 1901 (aged 64) Liège, Liège Province, Belgium
- Education: Diocesan Seminary of Liège, Pontifical Gregorian University

Victor Joseph Doutreloux (1837–1901) was a Belgian Catholic clergyman who became bishop of Liège.

== Life ==
Doutreloux was born in Chênée on 18 May 1837 and educated at the Collège Marie-Thérèse in Herve and the minor seminary in Sint-Truiden. He entered the Major Seminary in Liège and went on to become a Doctor of Sacred Theology of the Gregorian University in Rome.

Doutreloux was ordained to the priesthood in 1861 and became deputy headmaster of the Collège Saint-Quirin in Huy. In 1865 he was appointed director of the minor seminary in Saint-Roch, and in 1871 president of the major seminary in Liège and an honorary canon. In 1874 he became vicar general of the diocese of Liège, and in 1875 coadjutor bishop, with right of succession, being consecrated bishop of Gera on 5 July 1875.

Doutreloux succeeded as bishop of Liège on 24 August 1879, immediately becoming caught up in the conflict (known as the First School War) around the Frère-Orban ministry's 1879 education law. Distrustful of state education, Doutreloux founded Catholic secondary schools in Hasselt, Tongeren, Bree, Peer, Visé, and Dolhain. During his time as bishop he consecrated 150 churches and encouraged largescale religious events, particularly Marian pilgrimages. He supported and helped organise Eucharistic Congresses in Liège, Antwerp and Brussels, but also in Jerusalem, Reims, and Paray-le-Monial. He was concerned to improve the moral and material circumstances of the working class, and took part in the Social Congresses held in Liège in 1886, 1887, and 1890, which were an important influence on the emergence of Christian democracy.

He died in Liège on 24 August 1901.
