= James Buckley =

James Buckley may refer to:

== Government ==
- James L. Buckley (1923–2023), American politician, jurist, diplomat, author, and corporate director
- James R. Buckley (1870–1945), U.S. Representative from Illinois
- James V. Buckley (1894–1954), U.S. Representative from Illinois
- Jimmy Buckley (c. 1905–1943), Royal Navy Fleet Air Arm pilot and prisoner of war

== Religion ==
- James Buckley (bishop) (1770–1828), English Roman Catholic bishop of Geras
- James Monroe Buckley (1836–1920), American Methodist doctor, preacher, and editor
- James Buckley (priest) (1849–1924), Archdeacon of Llandaff

== Others ==
- James Buckley (actor) (born 1987), English actor who starred in The Inbetweeners
- Jim Buckley (born 1959), Australian rules footballer
- Jim Buckley (rugby union), Irish rugby union player
- James Buckley, head of the blackface minstrel troupe Buckley's Serenaders

== See also ==
- James Buchli (born 1945), American astronaut
