= Edwin Linssen =

Dutch footballer (born 1980)

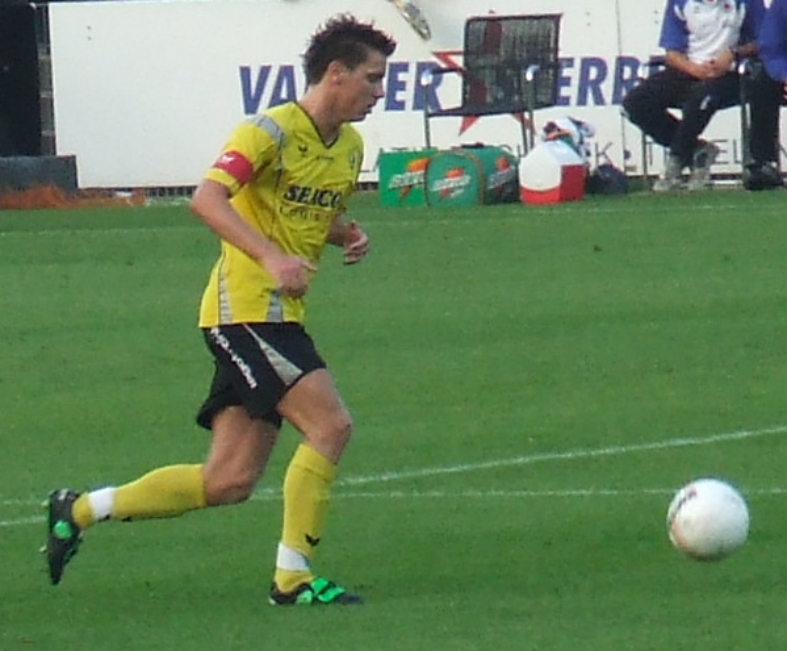

Personal information
- Full name: Edwin Jacobus Gerardus Maria Linssen
- Date of birth: 28 August 1980 (age 45)
- Place of birth: Neeritter, Netherlands
- Position: Midfielder

Senior career*
Years	Team	Apps	(Gls)
1998–2008	VVV-Venlo	265	(19)
2003–2004	→ Helmond Sport (loan)	30	(6)
2008–2010	Roda JC	36	(0)
2010	→ Fortuna Sittard (loan)	12	(0)
2010–2013	AEK Larnaca	64	(6)
2013–2015	De Graafschap	63	(0)
- * Club domestic league appearances and goals

Edwin Jacobus Gerardus Maria Linssen (born 28 August 1980) is a Dutch former professional footballer who played as a midfielder.

== Career ==
Born in Neeritter, Linssen played for VVV-Venlo, Helmond Sport, Roda JC, Fortuna Sittard and AEK Larnaca, before signing with De Graafschap.

== Personal life ==
He is the older brother of fellow professional footballer Bryan Linssen.
