= Our Lady of Banneux =

1933 apparition of Mary in Belgium

Coordinates: 50°32′19.4″N 05°45′02.6″E

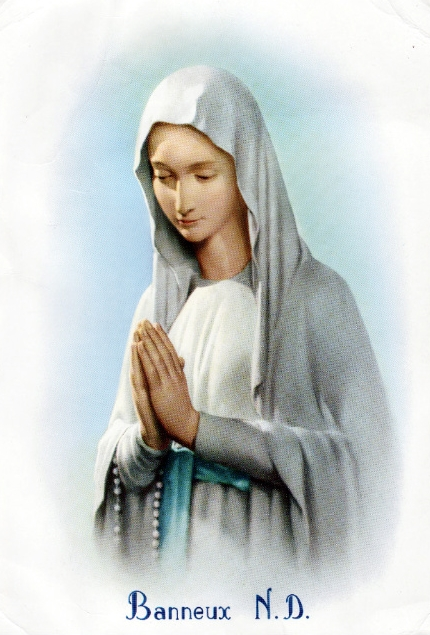
- Our Lady of the Poor – Banneux, Belgium
- Location: Banneux, Belgium
- Date: 15 January – 2 March 1933
- Witness: Mariette Beco
- Type: Marian apparition
- Approval: 22 August 1949; Bishop Louis-Joseph Kerkhofs; Diocese of Liège
- Venerated in: Catholic Church
- Shrine: Shrine of Our Lady of Banneux, Belgium

Our Lady of Banneux (French: Notre-Dame de Banneux), or Our Lady of the Poor, is the Catholic title given to the eight apparitions of the Virgin Mary to Mariette Beco, an adolescent girl living in Banneux, Liège Province, Belgium, between 15 January and 2 March 1933. Beco told her family and parish priest of seeing a Lady in white who declared herself to be the "Virgin of the Poor", saying "I come to relieve suffering" and "Believe in me and I will believe in you".

== History ==
=== Background ===
Mariette Beco was 11 and a half years old when she reported eight Marian apparitions in 1933 in Banneux, Belgium, a hamlet about 15 kilometres (10 mi) southeast of the city of Liège. She was the eldest of seven children and her family's living conditions were difficult. They lived in a modest working-class house on the outskirts of the village, near a large pine forest.

=== The apparitions ===
According to Mariette, she first saw the Blessed Virgin on the evening of Sunday 15 January 1933, as she was looking out the kitchen window. A woman in white stood in the garden of their house and called to her to come out with a wave of her hand. But her mother forbade her to go out. She is described as a young lady in the yard smiling at her. The woman was bent slightly forward and wearing a long white gown with a blue sash, and a transparent white veil.

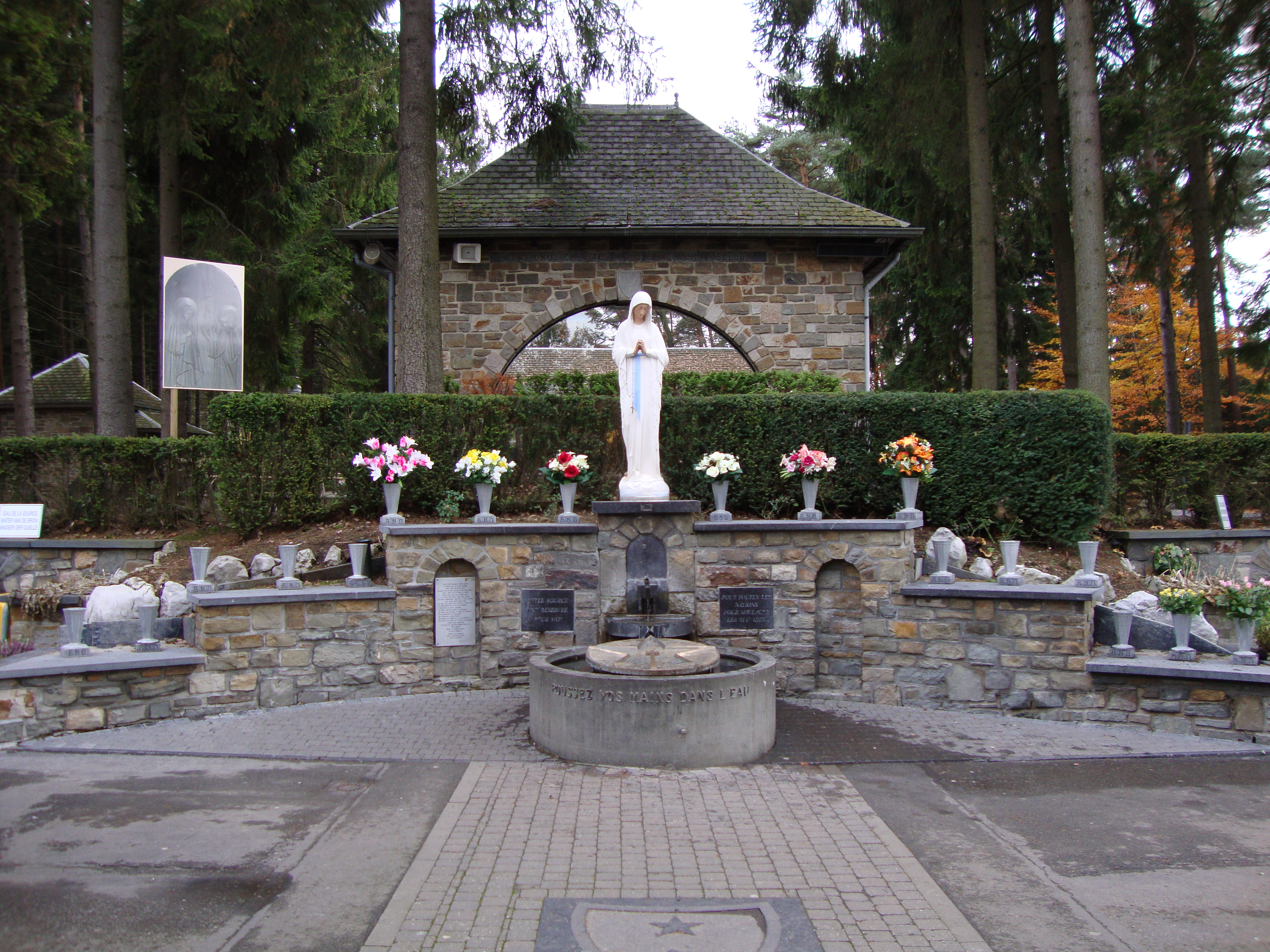
The miraculous spring of Our Lady of the Poor, in Banneux, Belgium

Three days later, on Wednesday 18 January 1933 around 7 p.m., Mariette had been praying on her knees in the garden of her house. Suddenly, the Lady appeared again and called her to leave the garden and head for the road. At some point, Mariette kneeled by a ditch, in front of a puddle of water coming from a spring. The Lady then told her : "Push your hands into the water" and "This spring is reserved for me".

The next day, on 19 January 1933, the Lady appeared to Mariette while she was kneeling on the path in a bad weather. Mariette then asked her : "Who are you, beautiful Lady?" The Lady answered : "I am the Virgin of the Poor". Then, after having led Mariette along the path to the spring, the Virgin told her : “ This spring is reserved for all nations... to relieve the sick”.

On 20 January 1933, Mariette went out around 6.45 p.m. and the Virgin appeared to her again. Mariette asked her: “What would you like, my beautiful Lady?" Smiling, the Virgin replied : "I would like a little chapel." The Virgin stretched out her hands, and with her right hand blessed Mariette.

On 11 February 1933, Mariette has once again been dragged to the spring by the Virgin. Three days later, on 15 February 1933, the Virgin appeared for the sixth time. That time, Mariette passed on Abbé Jamin's request for The Virgin to show them a sign. The lady replied : "Believe in me, I will believe in you." She also added for Mariette: "Pray a lot." The Virgin then gave her a secret and left.

On February 20, the Virgin told Mariette at the spring : "My dear child, pray a lot". Mariette then waited ten days before seeing the Virgin for the last time. On 2 March 1933, during a rainy day, Mariette was praying her third rosary when, around 7 p.m., it suddenly stopped raining and the Virgin appeared. That day, according to Mariette, Mary told her : "I am the Mother of the Savior, Mother of God. Pray much."

=== The seer ===
Mariette became at the time the object of local derision, with even her grandmother and aunt making fun of her. Boys followed her around, calling her "Bernadette", kneeling and asking for her blessing.

After the apparitions, Mariette decided to remain a private person, married and led a quiet family life. Mariette died on 2 December 2011, at the age of 90. In 2008 she made a final statement about her role in the apparitions: "I was no more than a postman who delivers the mail. Once this has been done, the postman is of no importance any more".

== Church approval ==
The claims of Mariette Beco were subject to an official investigation from 1935 to 1937 by an episcopal commission. The evidence collected was submitted to Rome for further analysis. Meanwhile, a hospital was built in 1938.

In May 1942, Bishop Kerkhofs of Belgium's Diocese of Liege approved the veneration of Mary under the title of Our Lady of the Poor and approved the apparitions themselves in 1949. Although the Holy See gave the bishop permission to approve the apparition, the Holy See itself did not approve it.

== The sanctuary ==
A small chapel stands where the Virgin of the Poor is said to have requested it to be built.

Over time the site drew pilgrims. Today, the small spring yields about 2,000 gallons of water a day with many reports of miraculous healings.

On 21 May 1985, during his trip to Belgium, Pope John Paul II visited the Sanctuary of Banneux and presided over a mass.

== Veneration ==
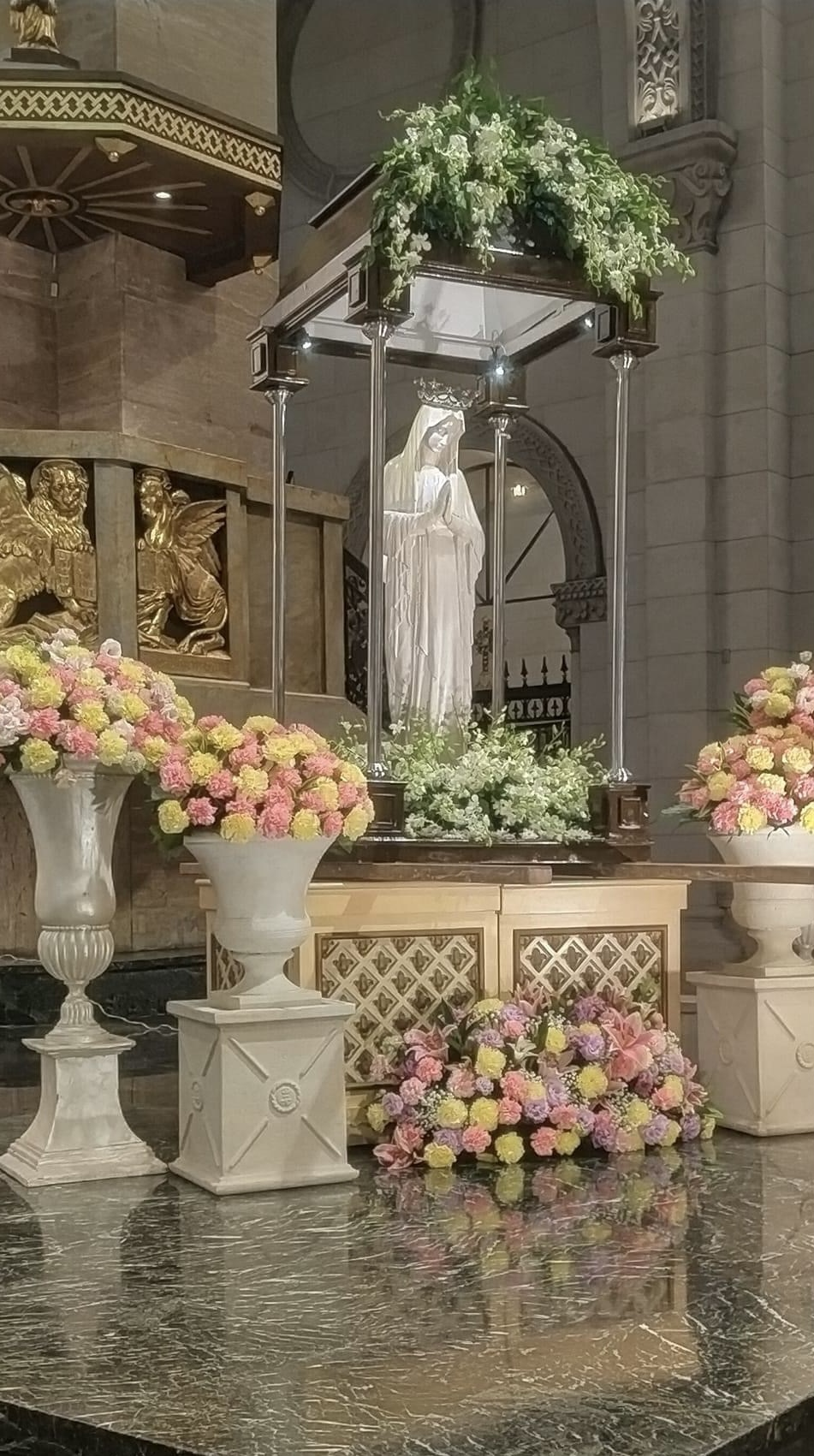
The venerated image of Our Lady of the Poor of Taguig during a visit in the Manila Cathedral. This image was crowned in 2018.

As Our Lady of Banneux she has two titles: Our Lady of the Poor and Queen of Nations. Her feast day under these titles is January 15.

== See also ==
- Our Lady of Beauraing
- Visions of Jesus and Mary
