= Gera (Egypt) =

Gera(s) was an ancient city and former bishopric in Roman Egypt and remains a Latin Catholic titular see.

Its modern location, now in Egypt, is unclear. Gera(s) was important enough in the Late Roman province of Augustamnica Prima to be one of the suffragans of its capital Pelusium's Metropolitan Archbishopric. It was however to fade completely.

== Titular see ==
The diocese was nominally restored as a Latin Catholic titular bishopric in the 18th century under the name Gerrha (Gerra in Curiate Italian), which was changed in 1925 to Gera(s).

It is vacant since decades, having had the following incumbents, all of the fitting episcopal (lowest) rank:

- Francisco Juan Leiza (1739.02.23 – 1747.10.24)
- Juan Francisco Manrique Lara (1749.09.22 – 1754.04.01)
- Alfonso Solís Grajera, OS (1757.07.18 – 1783.02.17)
- Fr. Dominicus Castells (1786.07.24 – 1788.07.23)
- Pablo Sitjar Ruata (1797.07.24 – 1808.03.16)
- James Buckley (1819.03.06 – 1828.03.26)
- Francesco Maria Zoppi (1833.04.15 – 1841.04)
- Johannes Zwijsen (1842.01.24 – 1853.03.04) (later Archbishop of Utrecht)
- Alexander Goss (1853.07.29 – 1856.01.25) (later Bishop of Liverpool)
- Daniel McGettigan (1856.02.29 – 1861.05.01) (later Archbishop of Armagh)
- Victor Joseph Doutreloux (1875.07.05 – 1879.08.26)
- Fedele Abati, OFM (1879.09.22 – 1885.01.11)
- Henri-Charles Lambrecht (1886.03.26 – 1888.06.17) (later Bishop of Ghent)
- João Fernando Santiago Esberard (Esberrard) (1890.06.26 – 1891.05.12) (later Archbishop)
- Constant-Jean-Baptiste Prodhomme, MEP (1913.06.02 – 1920.08.20)
- Luca Ermenegildo Pasetto, OFMConv (1921.11.21 – 1937.09.22), as Secretary of Sacred Congregation of Religious (1935 – 1950.11.11), later Titular Archbishop of Iconium (1937.09.22 – 1950.11.11), Latin Titular Patriarch of Alexandria (1950.11.11 – death 1954.01.22)
- Ilarino Felder, OFMCap (1938.04.12 – 1951.11.27)
- Jacinto Argaya Goicoechea (1952.08.15 – 1957.09.12)
- John Michael Fearns (1957.11.04 – 1977.07.04)

== Source and External links ==
- GCatholic, with titular incumbent bio links
