= Agilfrid =

8th-century Frankish bishop

- See: Diocese of Liège
- In office: 769 - 13 December 787
- Predecessor: Fulcaire
- Successor: Gerbald

Personal details
- Born: 8th century
- Died: 13 December 787
- Denomination: Catholic

Agilfrid (Note: Alternatively spelled Agelfredus, Egelfredus or Eilfried.) (died 13 December 787) was a Roman Catholic bishop, who was an associate of Charlemagne and served as the Bishop of Liège from 769 until his death in 787.

== Biography ==
Agilfrid was born in the early 8th century into a noble Frankish family, and has been said to be a relative of Charlemagne. Due to no clarification of how Agilfrid was related to him, historians suggest that he was related through one of his wives. Agilfrid served as an abbot of Saint-Amand Abbey and Saint Bavo's Abbey prior to his ascension to bishop, and is assumed to have retained the title of abbot during his episcopate. Sometime in 754, Agilfrid, while returning from Rome, acquired and brought the relics of Pharaildis and Bavo of Ghent from Lotharingia to Saint Bavo's Abbey, where they remain present to this day.

Agilfrid was said to be well respected at the courtyard of Charlemagne, who granted him several franchises and considerable assets in favor of his church, and appointed Agilfrid as Bishop of Liège in 769, (Note: Other sources date the appointment as bishop to 765, and 768, but these are in contradiction with historical sources.) replacing the previously deceased Fulcaire. Charlemagne also visited the Diocese of Liège on multiple occasions, celebrating Easter. According to the Annales Laubacenses, in 774, Agilfrid was entrusted by Charlemagne to handle the detention of Desiderius and his wife Ansa.

It has recently been suggested, that Agilfrid sanctified the first church in Osnabrück sometime from 783 to 787, which was a wooden church and served as the seat for the Diocese of Osnabrück at the time of establishment.

Agilfrid died on 13 December 787 and was succeeded by Gerbald.

== Works cited ==
- van den Steen de Jehay, Xavier (1880). La Cathédrale de Saint Lambert à Liège et son chapitre de tréfonciers (in French). Liège: L. Grandmont-Donders. p. 55.
- Dewez, Louis Dieudonné Joseph (1822). Histoire du pays de Liége (in French). Vol. 1. Liège: Delemer. pp. 11–12.
- Normand, Théodule Elzéar Xavier (1841). Galerie des saints et des saints qui protégent la Belgique et les Pay-Bas / par M. l'Abbé Normand (in French). Brussels: Société Nationale des Beaux-Arts. p. 4.
- "AGILFRIDUS". prosopographie.eu (in French).
- Kaemmerer, Walter (1953). "Agilfrid". Neue Deutsche Biographie (in German). Vol. 1. Berlin: Duncker & Humblot. p. 94. (full text online).
- de Ram, Pierre François Xavier (1866). "AGILFRIDE". Biographie Nationale de Belgique. 1. Royal Academy of Belgium: 125–126.
- Stadler, John Evangelist; Heim, Franz Joseph (1875). "Pharaldis, S." Vollständiges Heiligen-Lexikon. 4. Augsburg: B. Schmid: 880–881.
- "De la fondation de la ville à la cité épiscopale". perso.infonie.be (in French). Archived from the original on May 18, 2021.
- Waitz, Georg (1881). "Annales Lobienses". Monumenta Germaniae Historica. 4. Hanover: 229.
- Hoogeweg, Hermann (1908). Verzeichnis der Stifter und Klöster Niedersachsens vor der Reformation (in German). Hanover, Leipzig: Hahnsche Buchhandlung. p. 103.
- Brandi, Karl; Bresslau, Harry; Tangl, Michael (1909). Archiv für Urkundenforschung (in German). Vol. 2. Leipzig: Veit & Company. p. 285.
- Hettner, Felix; Hansen, Joseph (1882). Westdeutsche Zeitschrift für Geschichte und Kunst (in German). Trier: Verlagsbuchhandlung von Jacob Lintz. p. 158.
