= Kessenich =

- Village
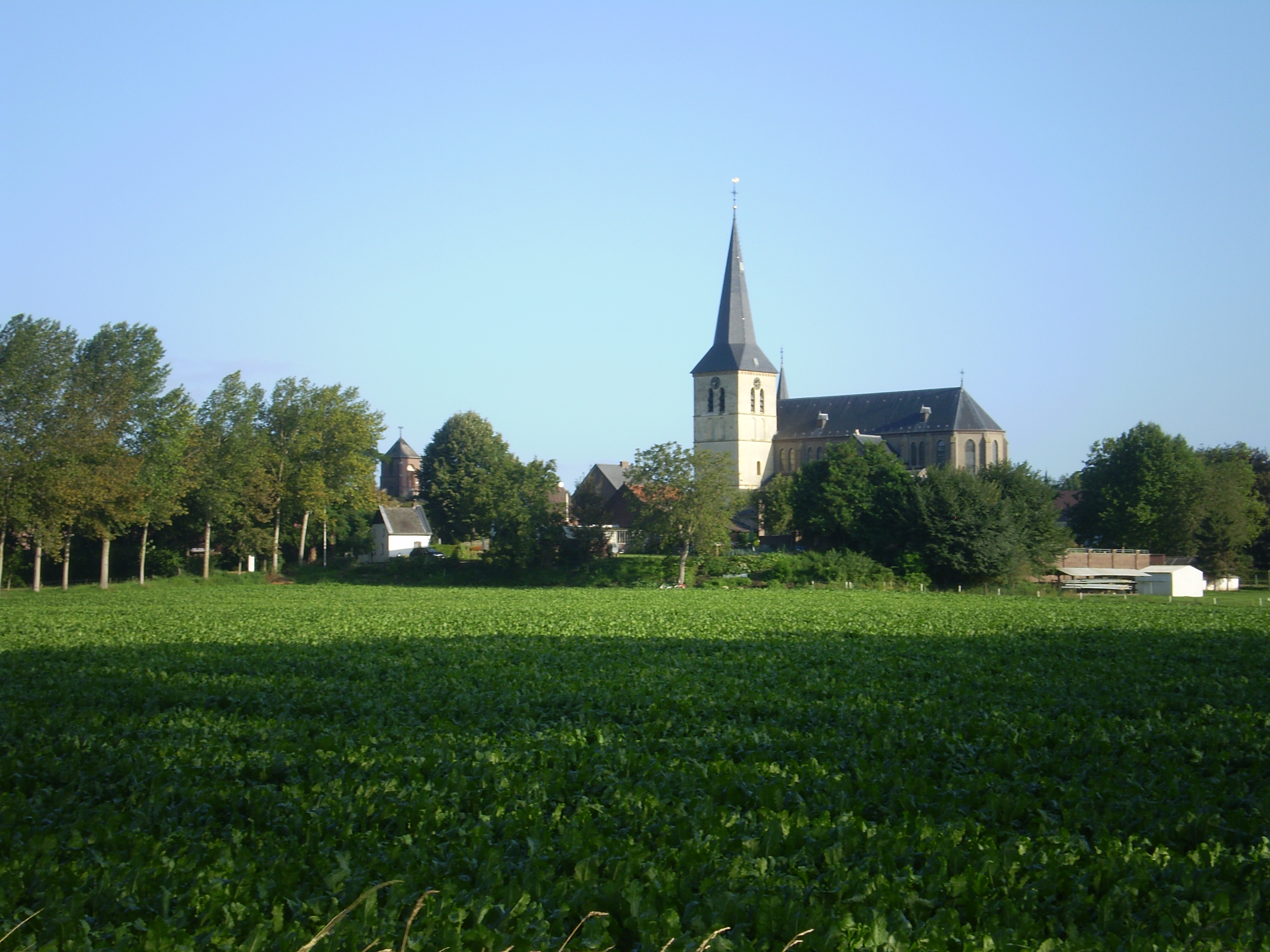

- Location in Belgium
- Coordinates: 51°09′N 5°49′E
- Country: Belgium
- Region: Flanders
- Province: Limburg
- Arrondissement: Maaseik
- Municipality: Kinrooi

Area
  - Total: 10.23 km^{2} (3.95 sq mi)

Population (2021)
  - Total: 1,946
  - Density: 190.2/km^{2} (492.7/sq mi)
- Time zone: CET

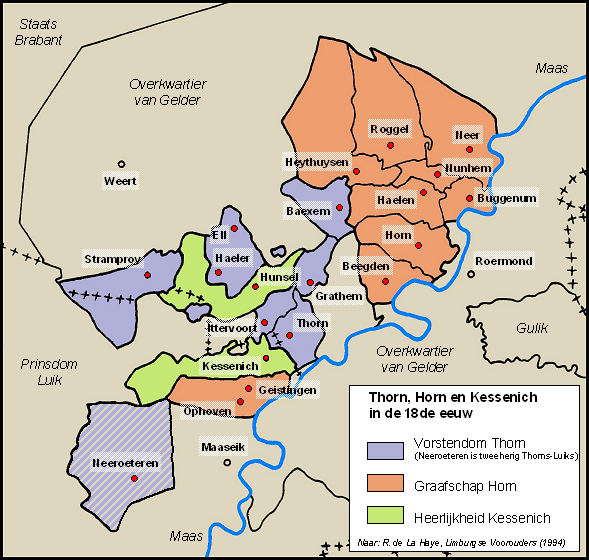
The division of Kessenich and surroundings before the 18th century.

Kessenich (German pronunciation: [ˈkɛsənɪç]) is a village in the Belgian province Limburg. It is a section of the municipality of Kinrooi, lying in the eastern end of the municipality.

== Geography ==
Kessenich is the end of the Grensmaas, the part of the Meuse who forms a natural border with the Dutch province Limburg. This river separates Kessenich from Stevensweert. In the north lie the Dutch villages of Thorn, Ittervoort and Neeritter. In the south lies Maaseik. The region of Kessenich is dissected by several rivers: the Abeek, the Itterbeek and Witbeek on their way to the Meuse.

East of Kessenich is an area with several ponds, the Maasplassen. They were created by large-scale exploitation of gravel from 1949. The gravel layer with a thickness of up to 10 m, was deposited by the Meuse, which repeatedly moved to the east. In May 2008 ended the gravel mining and began the partial attenuation of the lakes. Now, some Maasplassen are equipped for recreation or nature.

== Name ==
Its name is derived from the Gallo-Roman Cassiniacum. Kessenich is also named as Kesnic (1102), Kasnech (1132), Casselin or Cassenic (1155), Kessenich (1219) and Cessenic (1224). Later, it's also identified on maps as Kessingen (1573) and Kesnick (1754). In Limburgish it's still called 'Kesing'.

== History ==
Kessenich is the oldest of the five villages of Kinrooi. It was founded as a Celtic settlement close to the Meuse. The Meuse has since shifted to the east, leaving a bogged arm to north of the village. This marsh, the Vijverbroek, was used in the Middle Ages to create a redoubt. According to a legend there was a village called ‘’Vijvere’’ between Kessenich and Thorn that was drowned. Now it is a unique area overgrown with alder and other tree and plant species.

Remains of a prehistoric settlement have been found on the Boterakker, south of the village. Other prehistoric remains have been found on the Hezerheide, west of the village. Roman catacombs (Molenwegske) and a 12 meter wide Roman road connecting Maastricht and Nijmegen have also been found.

After the fall of the Western Roman Empire, a shire covering Kessenich, Thorn, Aldeneik and some other villages came into existence. Ansfried of Utrecht might have been the last count of this area, because in that period the shire suddenly fall apart. Finally, the area was divided into three parts: Thorn, Aldeneik, and Kessenich. Thorn and Aldeneik became important abbeys, Kessenich was lying between both. So there was a major influence of those abbeys. Kessenich became an imperial free city, since the 14th century united with the county Bronshorn (Hunsel).

The county of Kessenich was governed out of a Motte-and-bailey, built as protection against the pillaging Vikings, who even Maastricht, Tongeren and Aachen have reached via the Meuse, and the many floods of the Meuse. From the tower on the 10 meters high artificial hill are ruins remaining. The new castle has been built in the 17th century, by the family Van Waes. The hamlet where the castle is, lies nearby Neeritter, so it's called Borgitter.

In the 18th century was Kessenich like whole Limburg the battlefield of the various wars. When the Dutch-British troops withdrew from the region under the leadership of the Duke of Malborough during the Spanish Succession War, Kessenich was plundered in 1714, besieged the castle and the countess captured. In the whole region it is still the annual tradition to burn a straw doll, which the Duke of Marlborough should propose.

In 1795, the French annexed also Kessenich and divided it into the department Meuse-Inférieure. The estates of the counts Van Waes were sold by the Frenchmen to the family Michiels. One of their descendants was Willem Michiels of Kessenich, who was mayor of Maastricht from 1937 till 1967. After Napoleon's defeat with the Battle of Waterloo, all countries of the Benelux were united into the United Kingdom of the Netherlands and the department became the Province of Limburg. The anthem of this province is written in Neeritter. In 1839, the province is divided with de Meuse as limit into a Belgian and a Dutch part.
