= Liège College, Leuven =

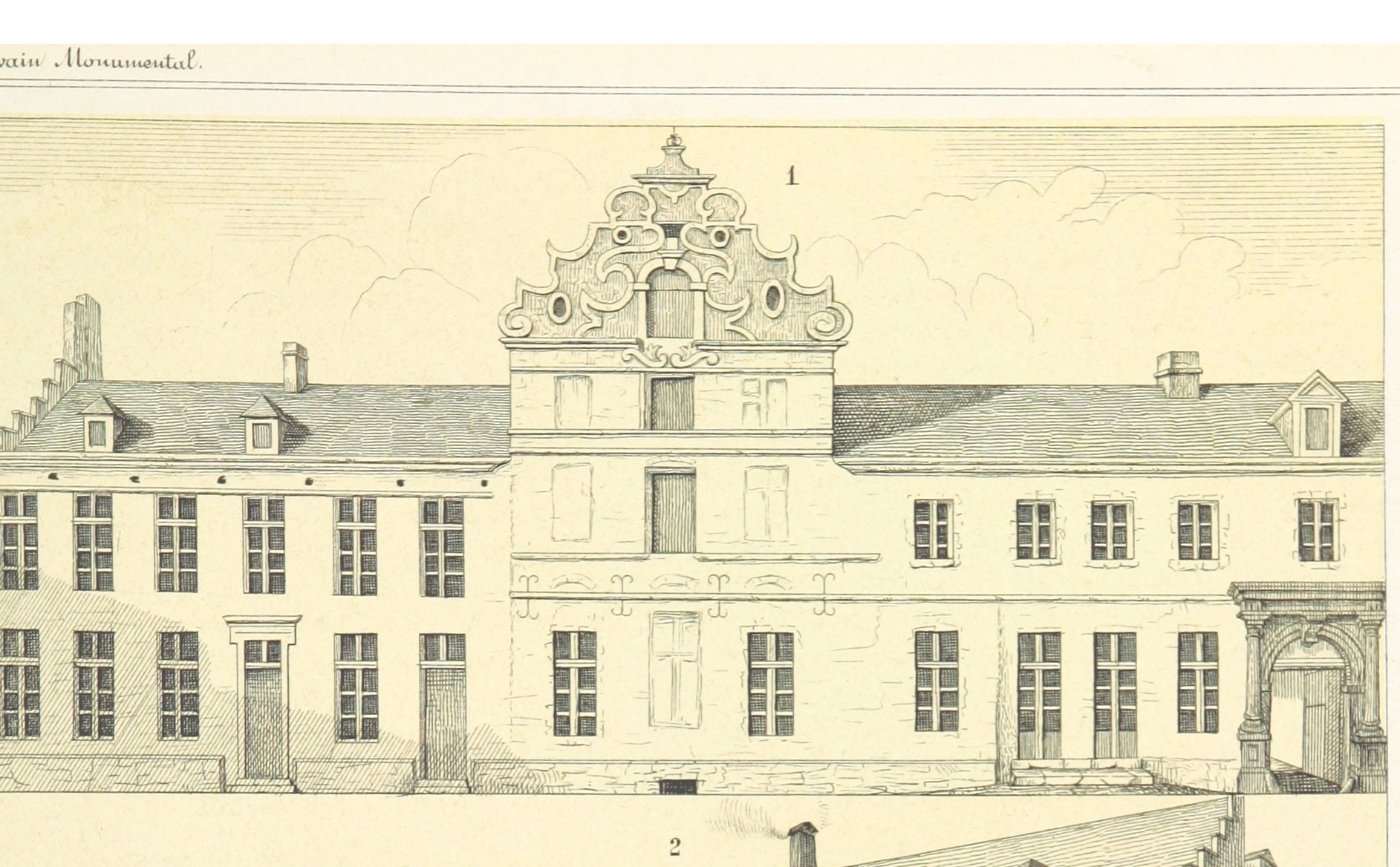

Liège College, founded 1605, was a college for the more academically inclined students of theology from the Diocesan Seminary of Liège to study at the University of Leuven.

The land for the foundation was purchased in 1602 at the request of Ernest of Bavaria, prince-bishop of Liège, as part of his campaign in support of the Catholic Reformation. The official foundation took place on 1 July 1605, with Jan Clarius as college president and three resident students. By 1671 the college consisted of a building on the Muntstraat, a chapel, a large garden and an additional house.

The college was closed in 1797 and the buildings sold in 1806. The parts of the original buildings that survive have been protected since 1974 and now house a number of restaurants. What had been the college garden is now the Jozef Vounckplein.
