= Diocese of Eupen-Malmedy =

Latin Catholic diocese in Belgium (1919-1925)

Coordinates: 50.4269°N 6.0278°E

The diocese of Eupen-Malmedy (initially Apostolic Administration of Eupen–Malmedy–Sankt Vith) is a former Belgian Latin Catholic diocese, which existed between 1919 and 1925, and included the East Cantons.

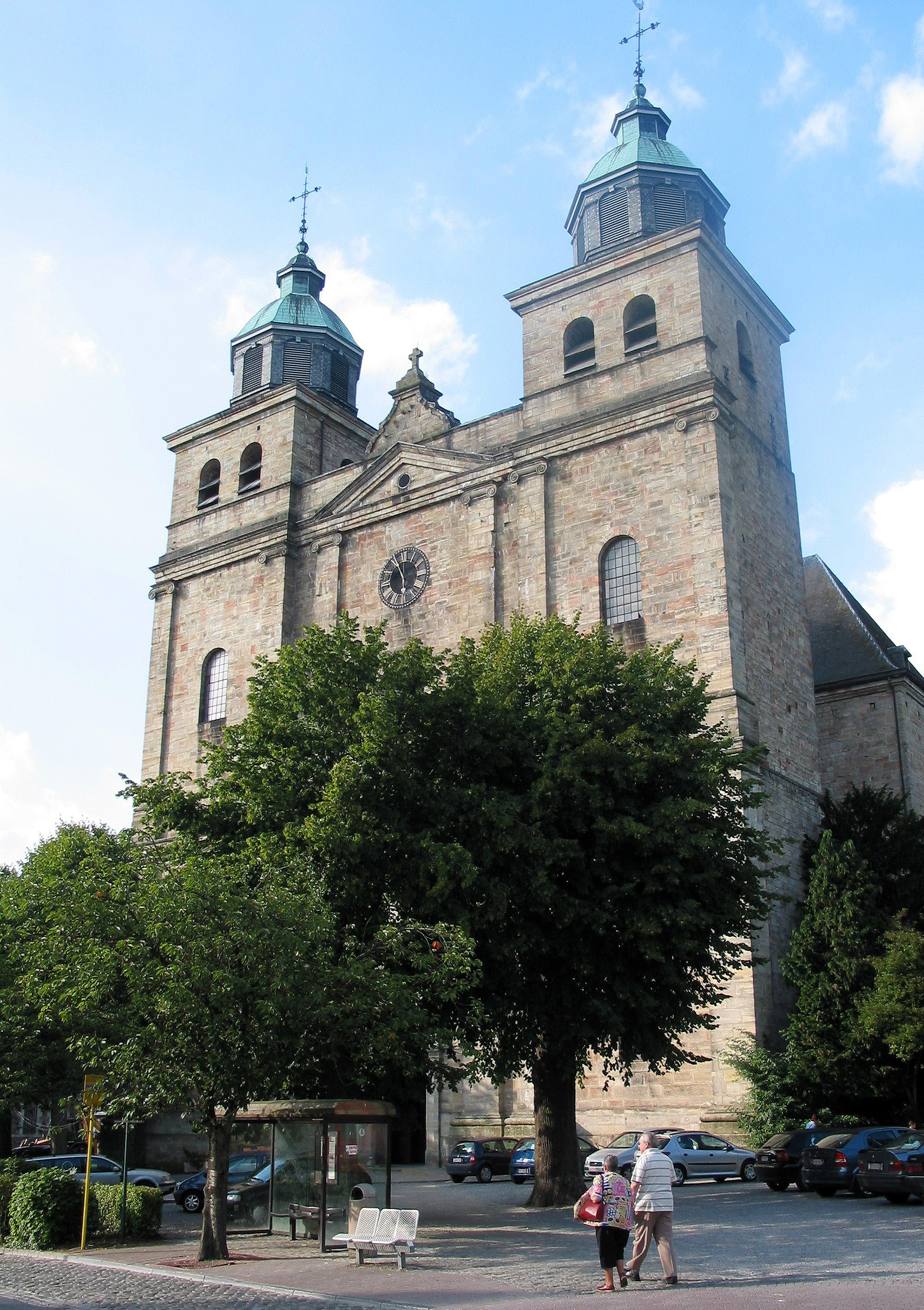
The Saints-Pierre, Paul et Quirin cathedral in Malmedy.

The short-lived diocese of Eupen-Malmedy is one of three former Belgian dioceses, and the only such see in present Belgium that has not been created a titular see.

== History ==
=== Origin ===
The jurisdiction was established in 1919 as Apostolic Administration of Eupen–Malmedy–Sankt Vith (a normally missionary pre-diocesan type of jurisdiction), on Belgian-occupied German territory split-off canonically from the Metropolitan Archdiocese of Cologne and entrusted to Archbishop Sebastiano Nicotra (1919 – 1920.07.30), then apostolic nuncio, the representative of the Holy See, to the Belgium government and the Catholic Church in Belgium.

The German areas Eupen and Malmedy were transferred from defeated Central power Germany to the Allied Kingdom of Belgium in 1920, conforming to the Treaty of Versailles, as part of the hefty compensation (besides huge reparation payments) for the losses the country had suffered during conquest and occupation in World War I.

There were difficulties for the population, who now were part of a different country. On the ecclesiastical field these problems were, that the population felt more related to the German Archdiocese of Cologne, than the French-speaking Diocese of Liège, which was dependent on the primatial archdiocese of Mechelen, the later archbishopric of Mechelen-Brussel.

=== Diocese ===
When the situation escalated, Cardinal Mercier, Primate of Belgium as Metropolitan Archbishop of Mechelen-Brussel, asked Pope Benedict XV to establish a diocese which would encompass the new Belgian territories. On 30 July 1920, the diocese of Eupen-Malmedy was created by elevating the apostolic administration (losing St-Vith in its name) with the publication of the papal bull Ecclesiae Universae.

Martin-Hubert Rutten, bishop of the neighboring but francophone Diocese of Liège, was also named bishop of this new diocese, in personal union. He was officially created bishop of Eupen-Malmedy on 13 October 1920, but remained bishop of the far more important bishopric of Liege as well. The Saints-Pierre, Paul et Quirin church of Malmedy became the cathedral episcopal see of the new bishop.

On 15 April 1925, the diocese was suppressed and its territory merged into the diocese of Liege, following another papal bull. The three deaneries, Eupen, Malmedy and Sankt-Vith became part of the diocese of Liege. The cathedral in Malmedy (former church of the Princely Abbey of Malmedy) would keep the status of cathedral, also after 1925.

== Ordinaries ==
Apostolic Administrator of Eupen–Malmedy–Sankt Vith

- Sebastiano Nicotra (1919 – 1920.07.30), Titular Archbishop of Heraclea (in Europa) (1916.12.18 – 1929.05.21), previously/concurrently Apostolic Nuncio (papal ambassador) to Chile (1916.12.18 – 1918) and Apostolic Nuncio to Belgium (1916.12.18 – 1923.07), Apostolic Internuncio to Netherlands (1918 – 1921) and Apostolic Internuncio to Luxembourg (1918 – 1923.07); later Apostolic Nuncio to Portugal (1923.07 – retired 1928; died 1929).

Suffragan Bishop of Eupen-Malmedy

- Martin-Hubert Rutten was the first and only bishop of Eupen-Malmedy, from 13 October 1920 till 15 April 1925, while Bishop of Liège (Belgium) (1901.12.16 – death 1927.07.17).

== See also ==
- List of Catholic dioceses in Belgium
- Catholic Church in Belgium

== Sources and external links ==
- GCatholic
- De Pooter, P. De rechtspositie van erkende erediensten en levensbeschouwingen in Staat en maatschappij, Larcier, page 240
- Diocese of Liège at Catholic Hierarchy, with notes on namechanges including Eupen-Malmedy
