= Guillaume Marie van Zuylen =

Gulielmus Maria van Zuylen (Argenteau, Belgium, January 4, 1910 – Liège, April 2, 2004) was the 89th bishop of the diocese of Liège from 1961 to 1986.

== Lifecycle ==
Van Zuylen was the grandson of Senator Guillaume van Zuylen (1838-1924), and the fourth of the eight children of Baron Joseph van Zuylen (1871-1962) and Angèle van Caloen de Basseghem (1878-1973). His father also became a senator, as well as a provincial councilor and mayor of Richelle and Argenteau. His mother was the daughter of Camille van Caloen de Basseghem, mayor of Varsenare and Marie-Louise de Bie de Westvoorde, daughter of the mayor of Sint-Kruis, Jules de Bie de Westvoorde.

He studied in Visé at the Collège Saint-Hadelin and in Liège at the Collège Saint-Louis. Like his older brother Antoine (1905-1983), he went to the minor seminary in Sint-Truiden and to the major seminary in Liège, where he was ordained a priest on September 11, 1932. He continued his studies at the Pontifical Gregorian University in Rome, graduating as a Doctor of Philosophy and Licentiate in Theology and Church History.

He became professor in 1936 and president in 1945 of the major seminary in Liège. He became a member of the Commission for the Code of Canon Law.

In 1940 he was chaplain of a regiment of armoured troops and was taken prisoner of war and held for seven months. From 1943 to early 1945, he was concerned with the work of supporting the families of prisoners of war. During the liberation of Liège, he took part, as chaplain, in the activities of the Secret Army.

In 1949 he became Vicar General and in 1951 Bishop Coadjutor of the Diocese of Liège. Ten years later he succeeded Bishop Kerckhofs. At that time, the diocese still extended over the provinces of Liège and Limburg. In 1967 Limburg became the separate diocese of Hasselt.

== Bishop ==
He participated in the Second Vatican Council from its opening in 1962. He became a member of the Commission for the Clergy and the Laity. After the promotion of the Constitution on the Liturgy, he became a member of the council to monitor the application of the document. In 1985 he received Pope John Paul II in the city of Liège.

Bishop van Zuylen made a great effort to put the ideals of the Council into practice in his diocese.

In 1968 he founded the council of priests and in 1971 the pastoral council. From 1979 he supported the creation of parish councils and pastoral teams. He was also the first, in 1969, to ordain permanent deacons in Belgium. However, the decline in priestly vocations forced him to close the seminary in Liège and to have his seminarians complete their studies elsewhere. In 1982 he reopened his seminary. He also emphasized the duties of lay people and for this purpose founded the Institut Supérieur de Catéchèse et de Pastorale, in charge of training teachers of religion and catechists.

In his old industrial diocese, he was deeply concerned about the deterioration of the living conditions for the workers. He encouraged Christian communities in the working class and supported worker-priests. He was outspoken on issues relating to economic recession, the closure of companies and unemployment. On May 22, 1969, he took part in the major trades unions rally that took place on the Place Saint-Lambert. In 1975 he visited the workers who occupied the workshops of Val-Saint-Lambert. Every year he took part in the Workers' March on the Tuesday of Holy Week.

Van Zuylen was trilingual, being fluent in French, Dutch and Walloon, and was also able to speak German. He sometimes gave sermons or speeches in Walloon.

After becoming Bishop Emeritus in March 1986, he retired to Wihou-Richelle. Among other things, he took care of the chaplaincy in a retirement home in 's-Gravenvoeren. He was buried in Saint Paul's Cathedral in Liège.
