= Geistingen =

- Village
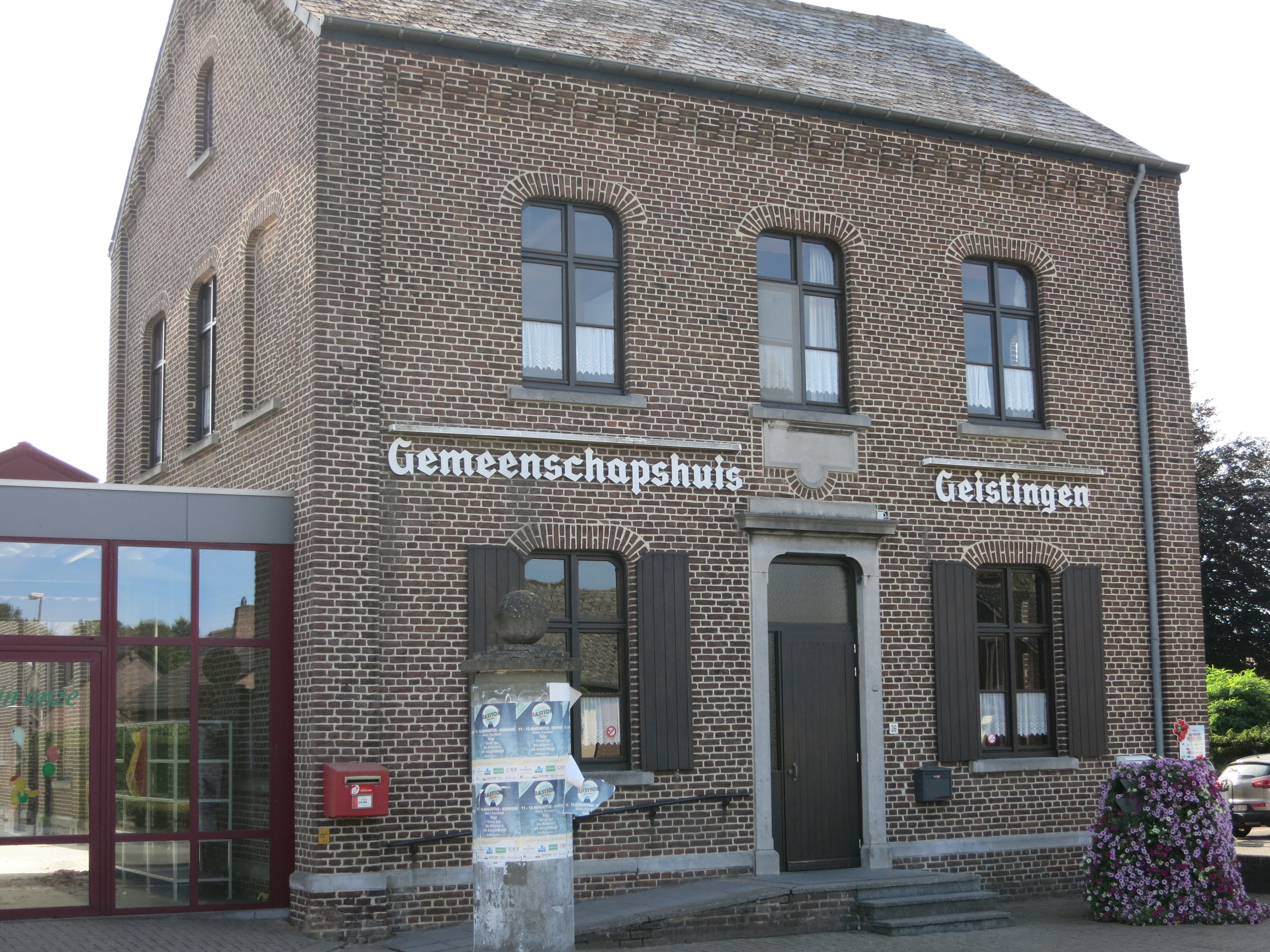
- Community House

- Location in Belgium
- Coordinates: 51.134°N 5.808°E
- Country: Belgium
- Region: Flanders
- Province: Limburg
- Arrondissement: Maaseik
- Municipality: Kinrooi

Area
  - Total: 4.89 km^{2} (1.89 sq mi)

Population (2021)
  - Total: 1,088
  - Density: 222/km^{2} (576/sq mi)
- Time zone: CET

Geistingen is a historic village that is now a submunicipality of Kinrooi, in the Limburg province in the Flemish Community of Belgium.

== History ==
In the 1st and 2nd century, a Roman camp was located in Geistingen, and the parish of Geistingen has existed since the 8th century. The village was located on the Roman road connecting Maastricht and Nijmegen At that time, it lay close to the river Meuse. The Meuse in the meanwhile had changed its course to the east. In the 15th century, Ophoven developed next to Geistingen, and the municipality was referred to as Ophoven-Geistingen. In 1450, both villages became part of the county of Horne. In 1614, Horne ceased to be independent and became part of the Prince-Bishopric of Liège. In 1971, the municipality of Ophoven-Geistingen merged into Kinrooi.

== Gallery ==
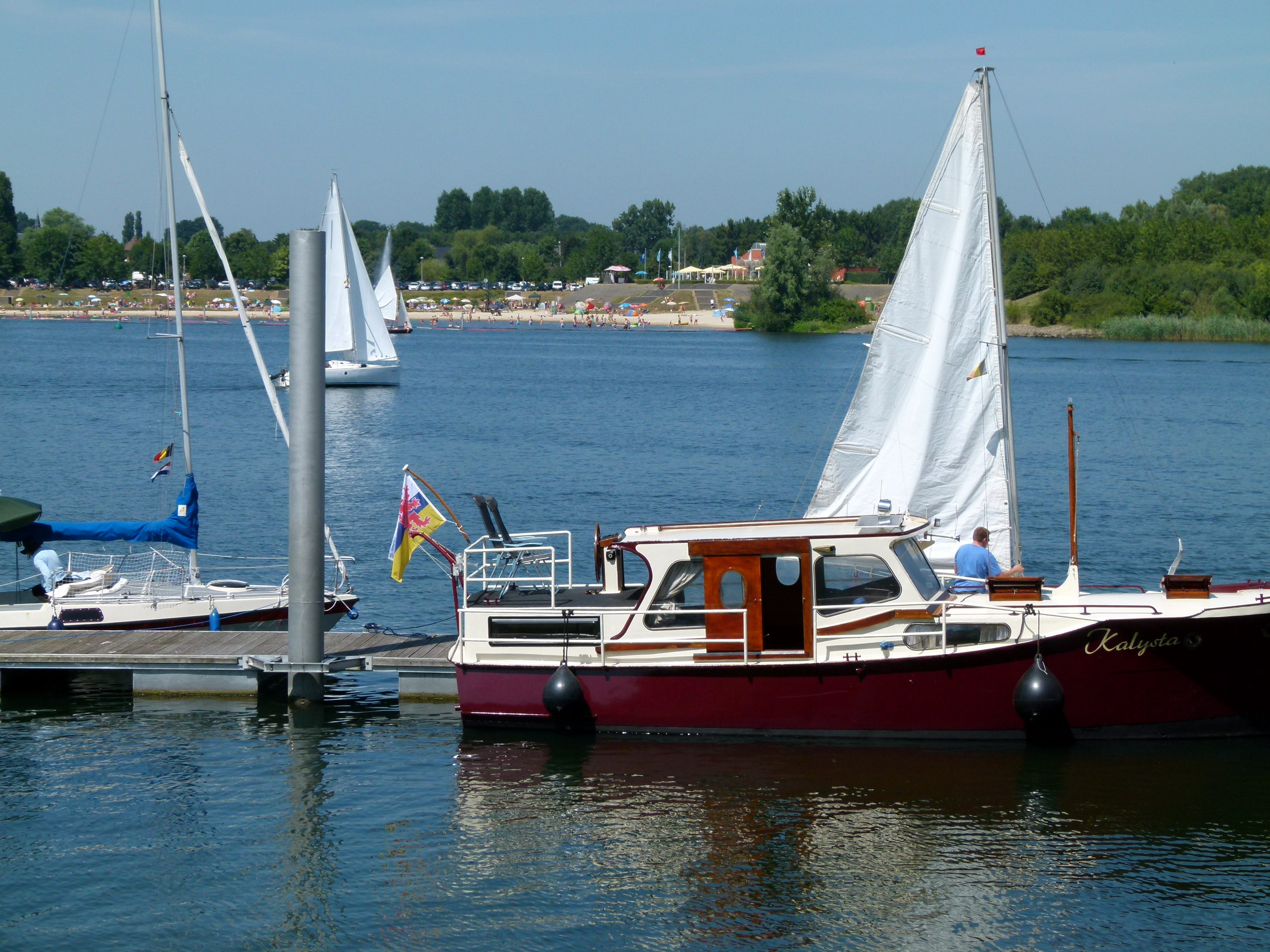
Spaanjerdplas

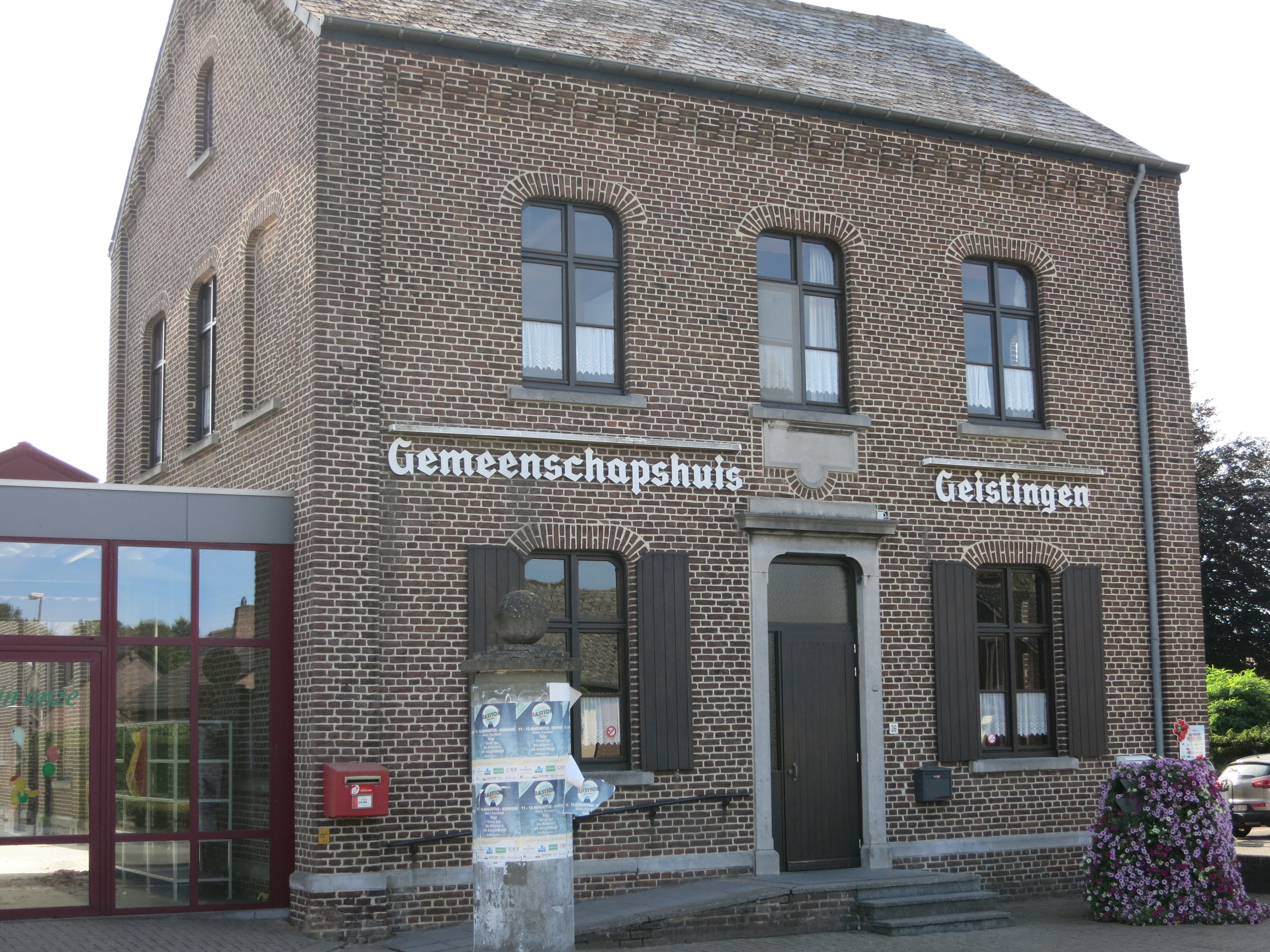
Community house

== Notable people ==
- Martin-Hubert Rutten (1841–1927), bishop.
