= Saint John I Agnus =

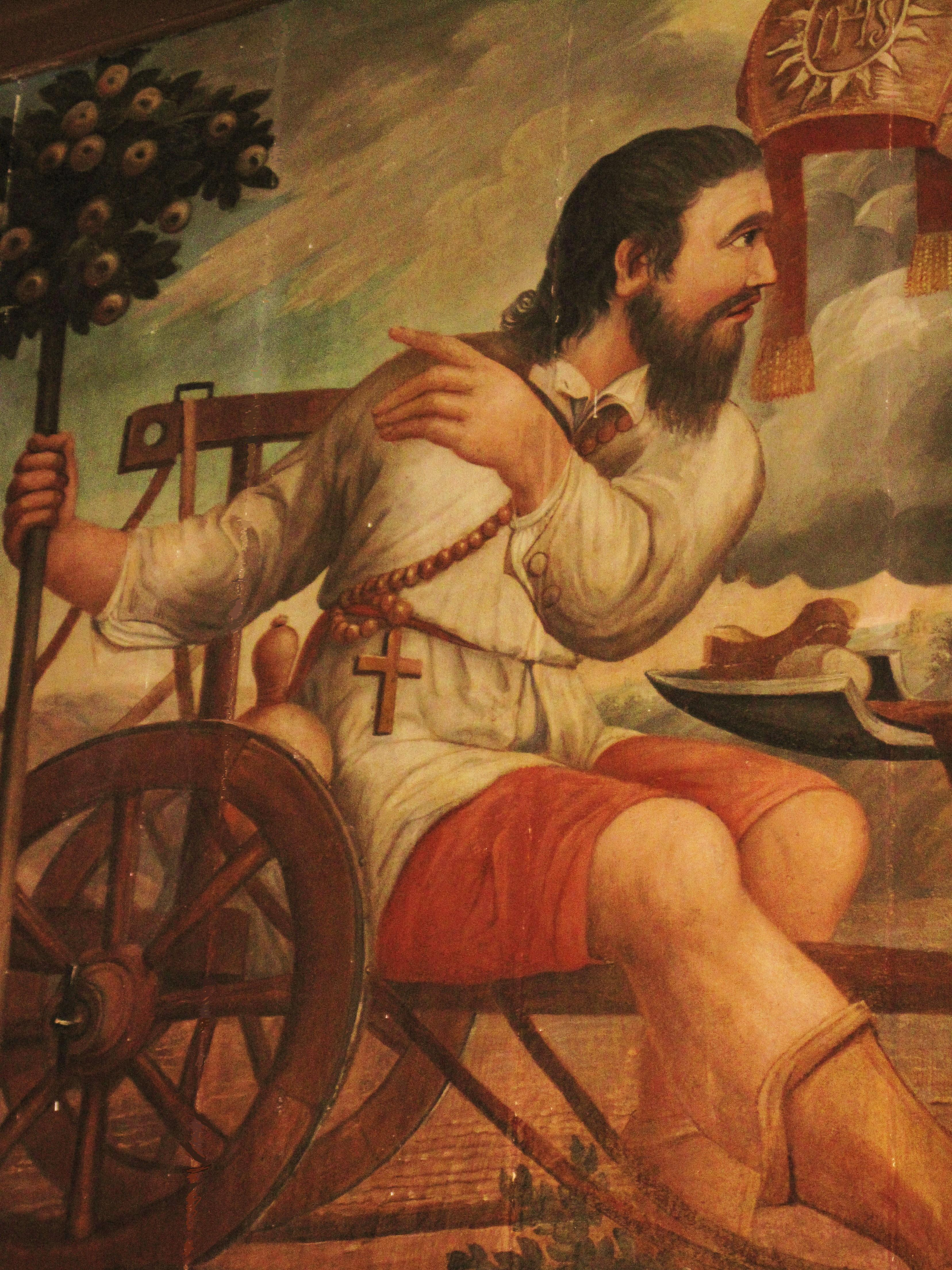
- Painting of St John Agnus in St Marguerite Church, Tihange, Belgium
- Born: 7th century
- Died: 7th century Maastricht
- Venerated in: Roman Catholic Church
- Feast: 25 July

Saint John I Agnus (French - Saint Jean l’Agneau) was the 25th bishop of Tongres. He lived in the 7th century and is considered as a saint by the Roman Catholic Church.

== Life ==
A farmer and the son of a rich landowner, he lived in Tihange, then a village near Huy. He was so well known for his pious life that he was chosen to succeed the 24th bishop of Tongres in 596, 625/626, 631 or even 639/640 according to different sources. These sources are mainly drawn from the saint's Vita in the Gesta Episcoporum Leodiensis by abbot Heriger of Lobbes, a contemporary of bishop Notker of Liège. He only served as bishop for six years before dying and was buried, according to his own wishes, in the chapel of Saints Cosmas and Damian which he had built in a tower of the castle at Huy.

== Bibliography ==
- (in French) Freddy Van Daele, Saint Jean l'Agneau de Tihange, Bande Dessinée,2011, éd. Alfred Van Daele, Hosdent-sur-Mehaigne.
