= Kinrooi =

- Municipality
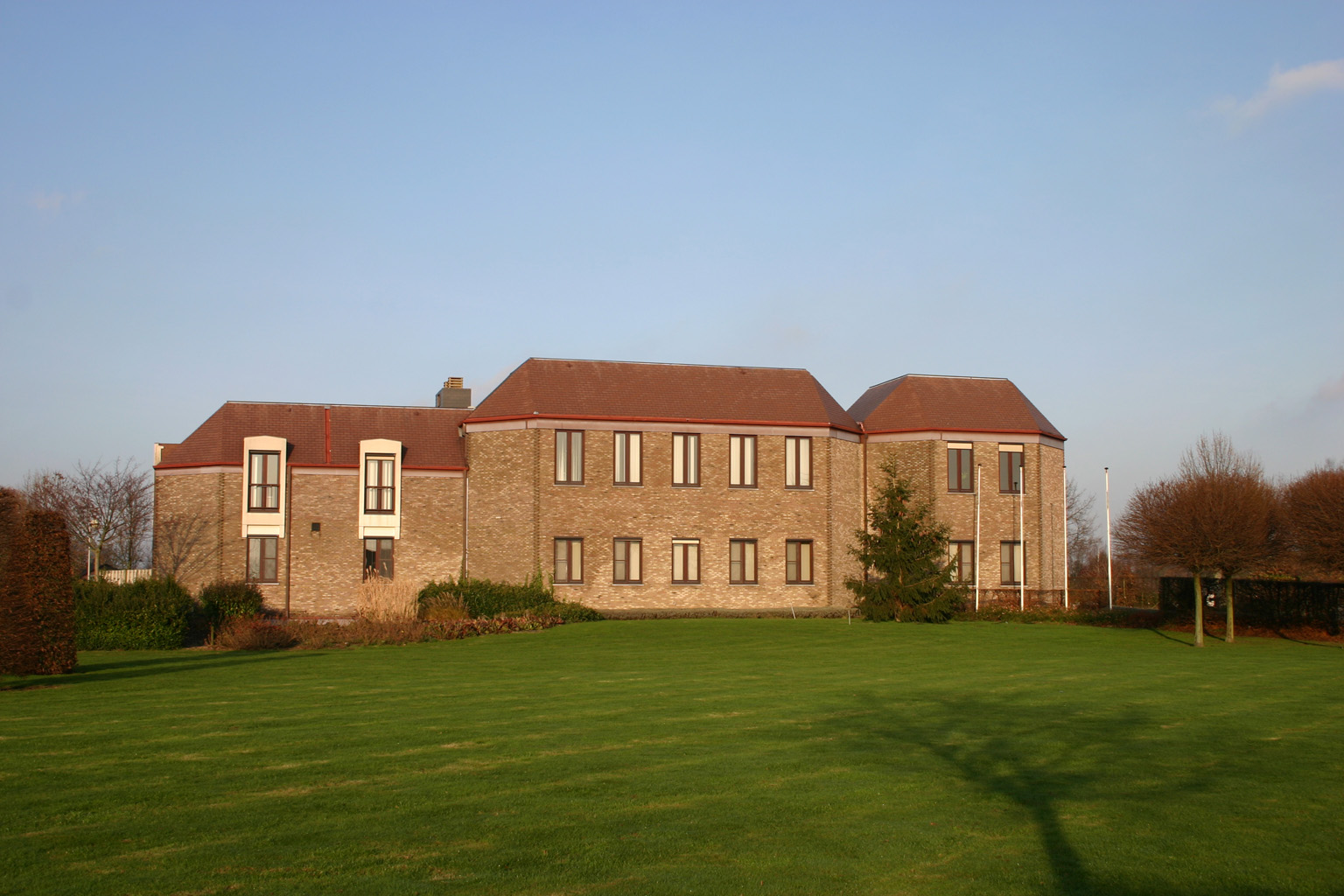
- Kinrooi town hall

- Flag Coat of arms

- Location of Kinrooi in Limburg
- Interactive map of Kinrooi
- Location in Belgium
- Coordinates: 51°09′N 05°45′E
- Country: Belgium
- Community: Flemish Community
- Region: Flemish Region
- Province: Limburg
- Arrondissement: Maaseik

Government
  - Mayor: Jo Brouns (CD&V); Wim Rutten (interim mayor)
  - Governing party: CD&V

Area
  - Total: 54.8 km^{2} (21.2 sq mi)

Population (2018-01-01)
  - Total: 12,233
  - Density: 223/km^{2} (578/sq mi)
- Postal codes: 3640
- NIS code: 72018
- Area codes: 089
- Website: www.kinrooi.be

Kinrooi (Dutch pronunciation: [ˈkɪnroːi]; Limburgish: Kinder) is a municipality in the Belgian province of Limburg, between Maaseik and Bree. On January 1, 2006, Kinrooi had a total population of 11,978. The total area is 54.76 km^{2}, which gives a population density of 219 inhabitants per km^{2}.

Kinrooi was formed on September 18, 1971, when the four municipalities Kinrooi, Kessenich, Geistingen-Ophoven and Molenbeersel were fused. There have been three mayors. The current mayor is Jo Brouns.

== History ==
Before, Kinrooi was a hamlet of the village of Kessenich. The flag reminds to that; the clarions stood on the shield of Kessenich. After the independence of Belgium in 1839 it became a little municipality, together with some nearby hamlets. In 2005 there are prehistoric remains found in the center, when it was being renovated.

== Economy ==
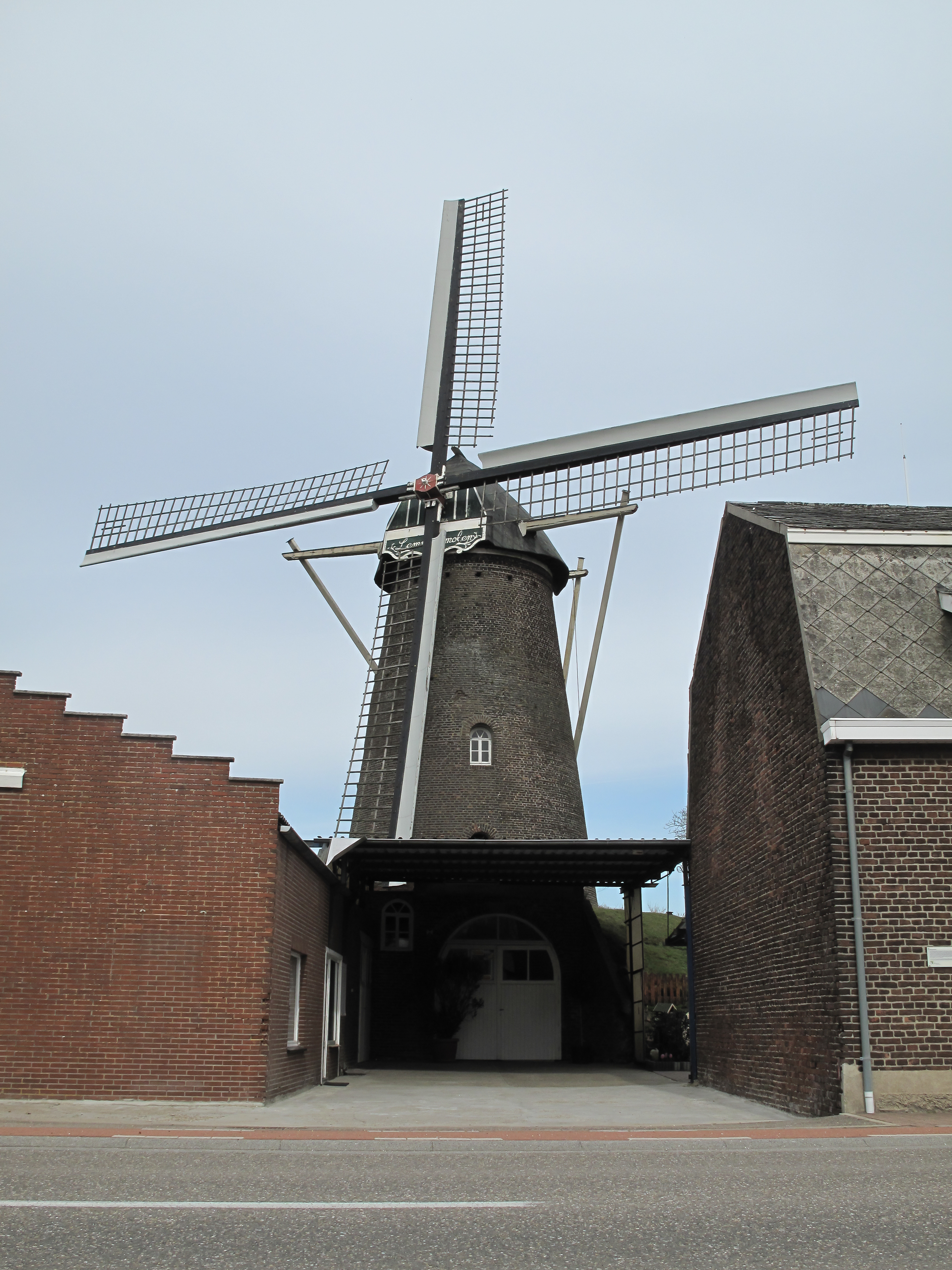
The "Lemmensmolen" in Kinrooi

Kinrooi's main economic activities are agriculture, tourism and the reclamation of gravel, sand and loam. The downside of this reclamation is that a lot of land surface gets lost. Tourism is also an important resource. Kinrooi attracts a lot of tourists because it has seven nature reserves that harbor rare animal and plant species, it has a marina and because it has several old windmills. Besides, there is a lot of watersporting, in the old gravel pools. One of them, lying in Ophoven, is now the greatest inner harbour of Europe.

== Places of interest ==
- The Lemmensmolen, a windmill built in 1856
- Sint-Martinuskerk (Kinrooi), a neogotical church built in 1853
