= Neeritter =

- Village
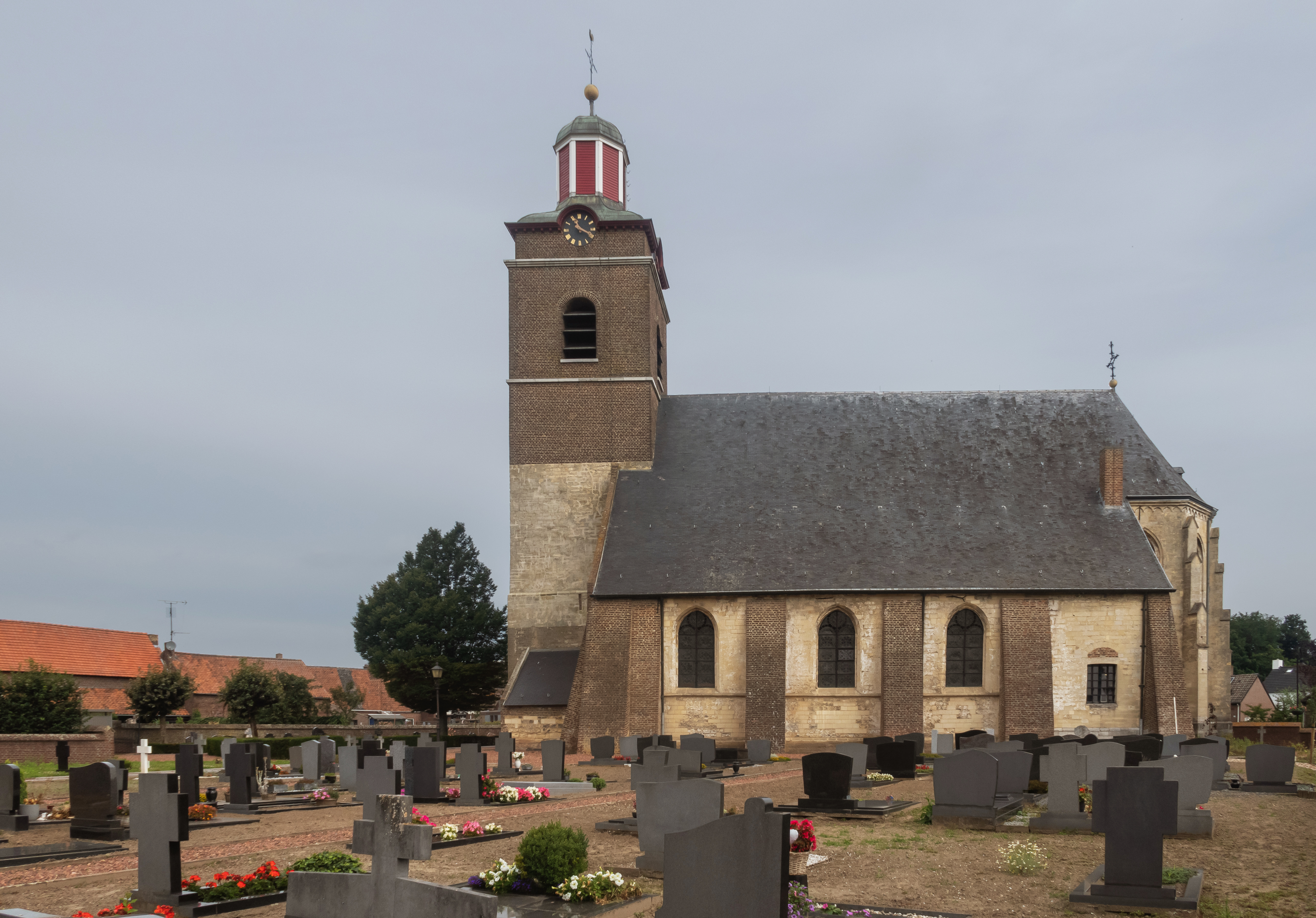
- St Lambertus Church

- Coat of arms

- Location in the Netherlands Location in the province of Limburg in the Netherlands
- Coordinates: 51°09′55″N 5°48′10″E
- Country: Netherlands
- Province: Limburg
- Municipality: Leudal

Area
  - Total: 4.23 km^{2} (1.63 sq mi)
- Elevation: 29 m (95 ft)

Population (2021)
  - Total: 1,275
  - Density: 301/km^{2} (781/sq mi)
- Time zone: UTC+1 (CET)
  - Summer (DST): UTC+2 (CEST)
- Postal code: 6015
- Dialing code: 0475

Neeritter is a village in the Dutch province of Limburg. It is located in the municipality of Leudal.

== History ==
The village was first mentioned in 1143 as "aliam Iteram que dicitur nova", and means "lower lying stream".

Neeritter developed in the Early Middle Ages along the Itterbeek. In 1584, a semi circular wall was built around the village to protect against the plundering armies during the Eighty Year's War. Between 1614 and 1795, it was part of the Prince-Bishopric of Liège. In 1839, the border between Netherlands and Belgium was defined, and the Borgitter Castle ended up in Kessenich, Belgium.

The Catholic St Lambertus Church is a three aisled church which has 13th century elements. The tower was enlarged in 1842.

The Armenmolen is watermill. A watermill has been known to exist at the site since 1280. The current mill was built between 1684 and 1687. It went out of service in 1950, and is a residential home since 1972. The water wheel was replaced in 1997.

Neeritter was home to 656 people in 1840. Neeritter was a separate municipality until 1942, when it was merged with Hunsel. In 2007, it became part of the municipality of Leudal.

== Gallery ==
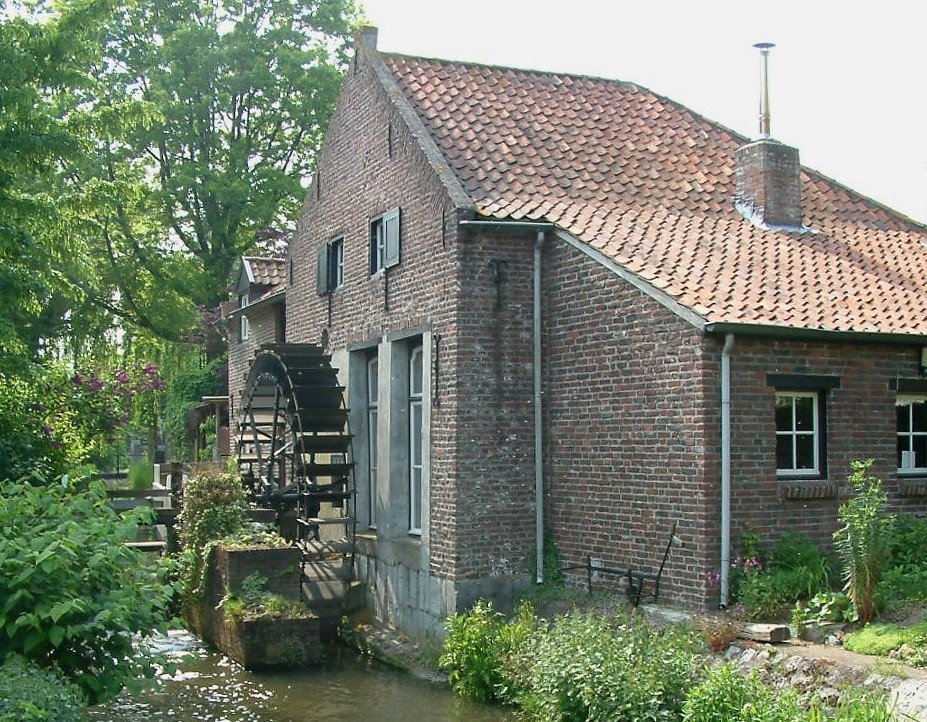
Water mill Armenmolen

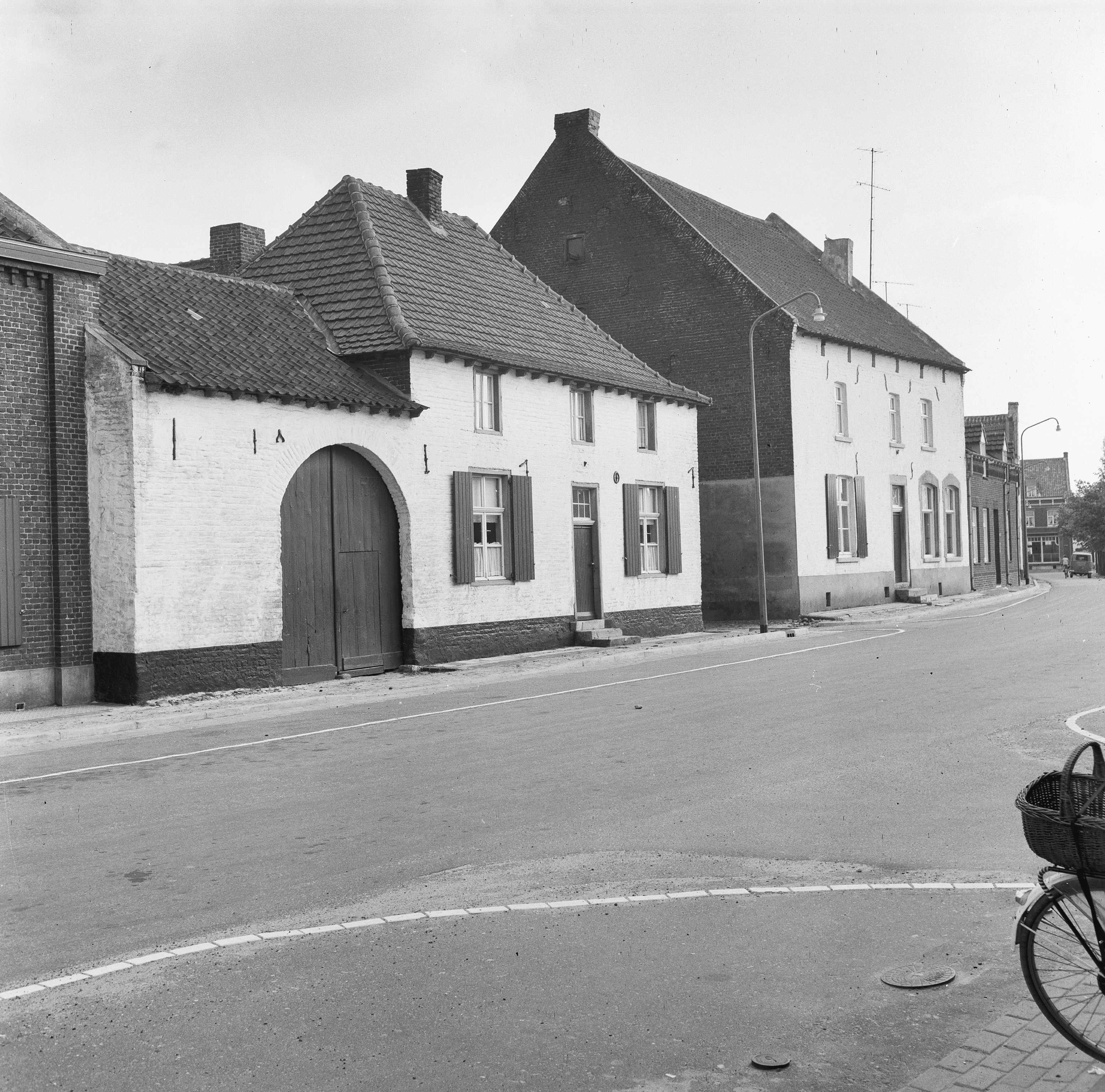
Street view

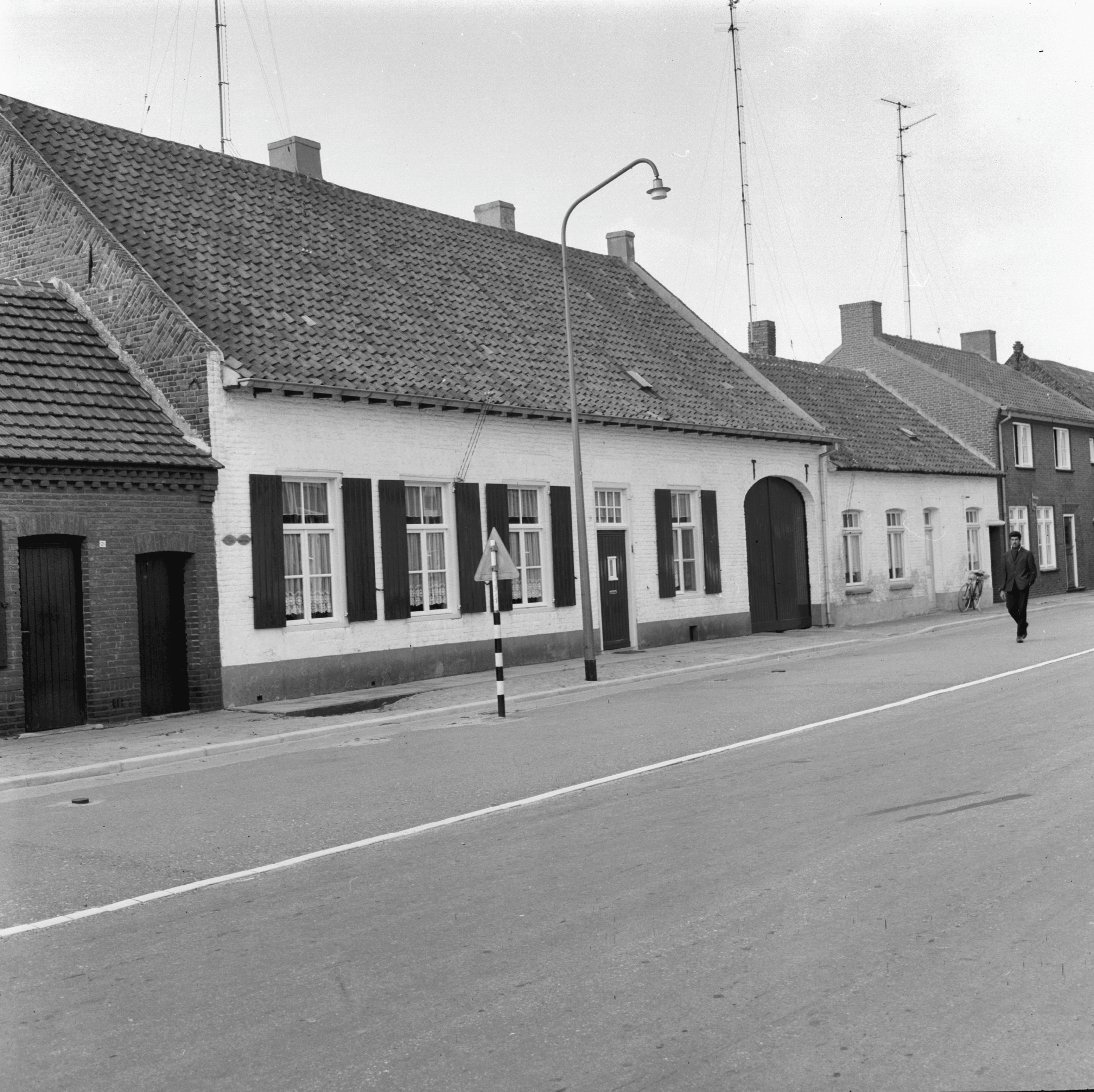
Street view
