= James Buckley (bishop) =

British bishop (1770–1828)

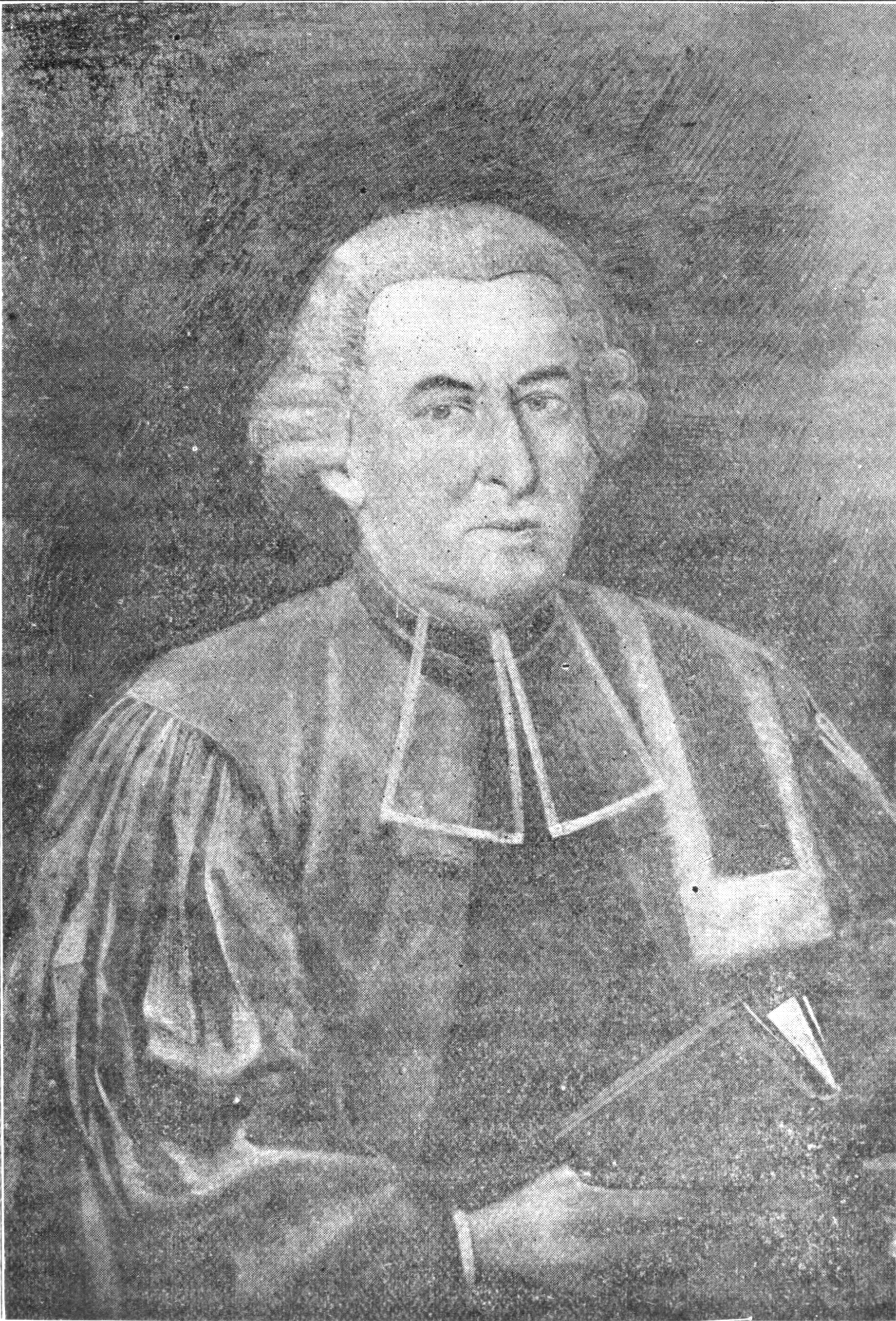

James Buckley (24 February 1770 – 26 March 1828) was a Roman Catholic bishop.

Buckley was born on 24 February 1770, son of John and Ann Buckley, of London. He was baptised by Rev. Gerard Robinson; admitted to English College, Lisbon on 22 February 1785; ordained a priest on 24 December 1794 and retained in the College as a superior till 1801; he was presented to the presidency of the College by Bishops Douglass and Poynter on 29 March and formally installed on 15 December 1806. He resigned and returned to the English mission in 1819.

It is recorded that he had great talents which he displayed throughout his College Course, especially in poetry, in which his compositions were of such beauty and excellence that Father Allen, his master, who himself had a most refined taste, expressed his opinion that not even Pope could have struck off more elegant verses in so short a time. He had been chosen Superior in 1795, a position which he held until 1801, when, at his own request, he came to England; to return again, however, as President in May 1806.

Soon after his return to London on 6 March 1819, Buckley was appointed Vicar Apostolic of Trinidad, Trinidad and Tobago, Antilles and titular Bishop of Geras, ordained on 29 June 1819. He died as the incumbent of both on 26 March 1828.
