= Vedrin =

Sub-municipality of the city of Namur, Belgium

Vedrin Vedrén (Walloon)
- Sub-municipality of Namur
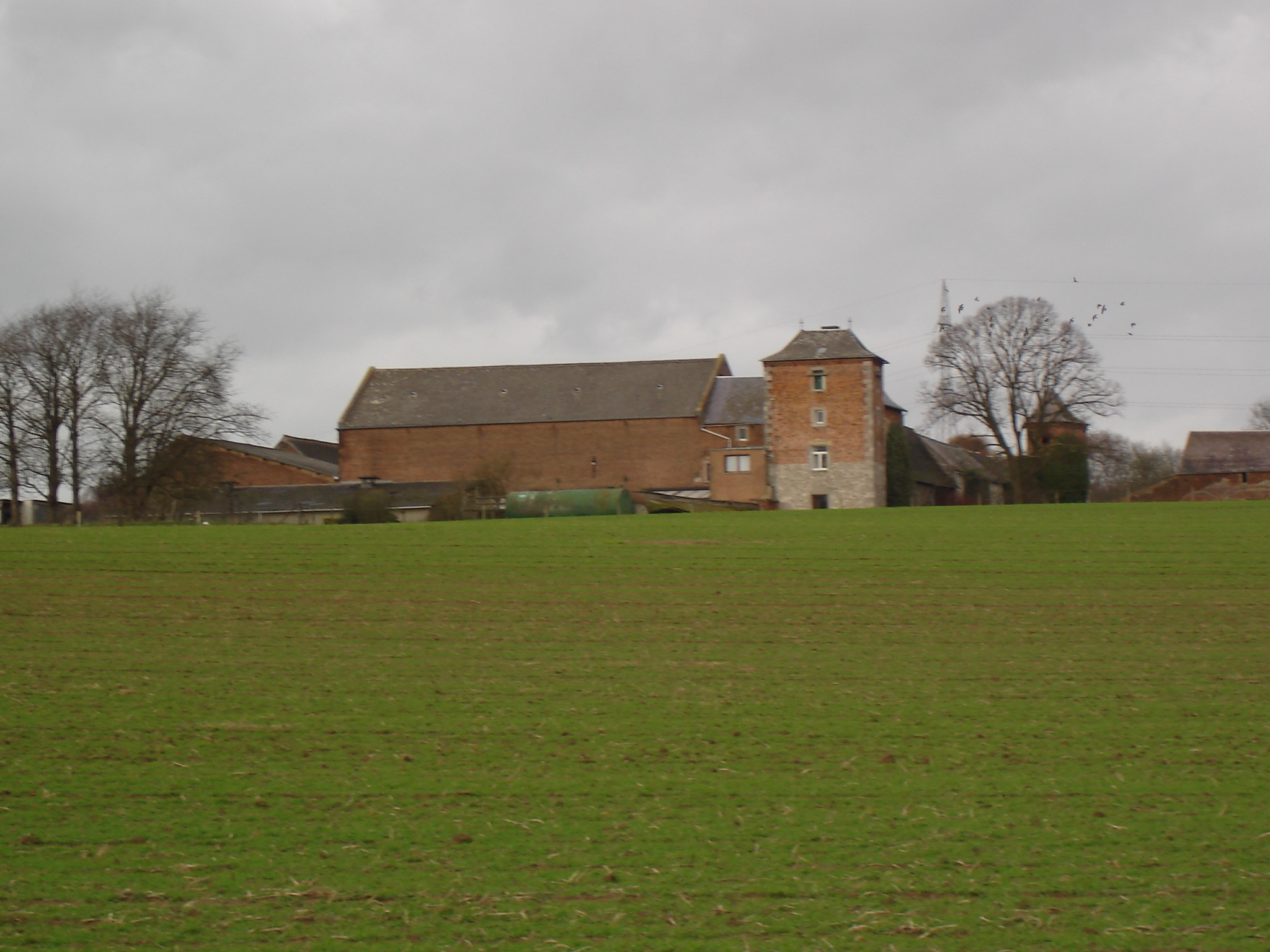

- Location of Vedrin in Namur
- Interactive map of Vedrin
- Location within Belgium Location within Namur Province
- Coordinates: 50°30′00″N 4°52′00″E
- Country: Belgium
- Community: French Community
- Region: Wallonia
- Province: Namur
- Arrondissement: Namur
- Municipality: Namur

Area
  - Total: 7.91 km^{2} (3.05 sq mi)

Population (2020-01-01)
  - Total: 6,647
  - Density: 840/km^{2} (2,180/sq mi)
- Postal codes: 5020
- Area codes: 081

Vedrin (French pronunciation: [vədʁɛ̃]; Walloon: Vedrén) is a sub-municipality of the city of Namur located in the province of Namur, Wallonia, Belgium. It was a separate municipality until 1977. On 1 January 1977, it was merged into Namur.
