= Banneux =

Town in Belgium

Coordinates: 50°32′16″N 5°44′24″E

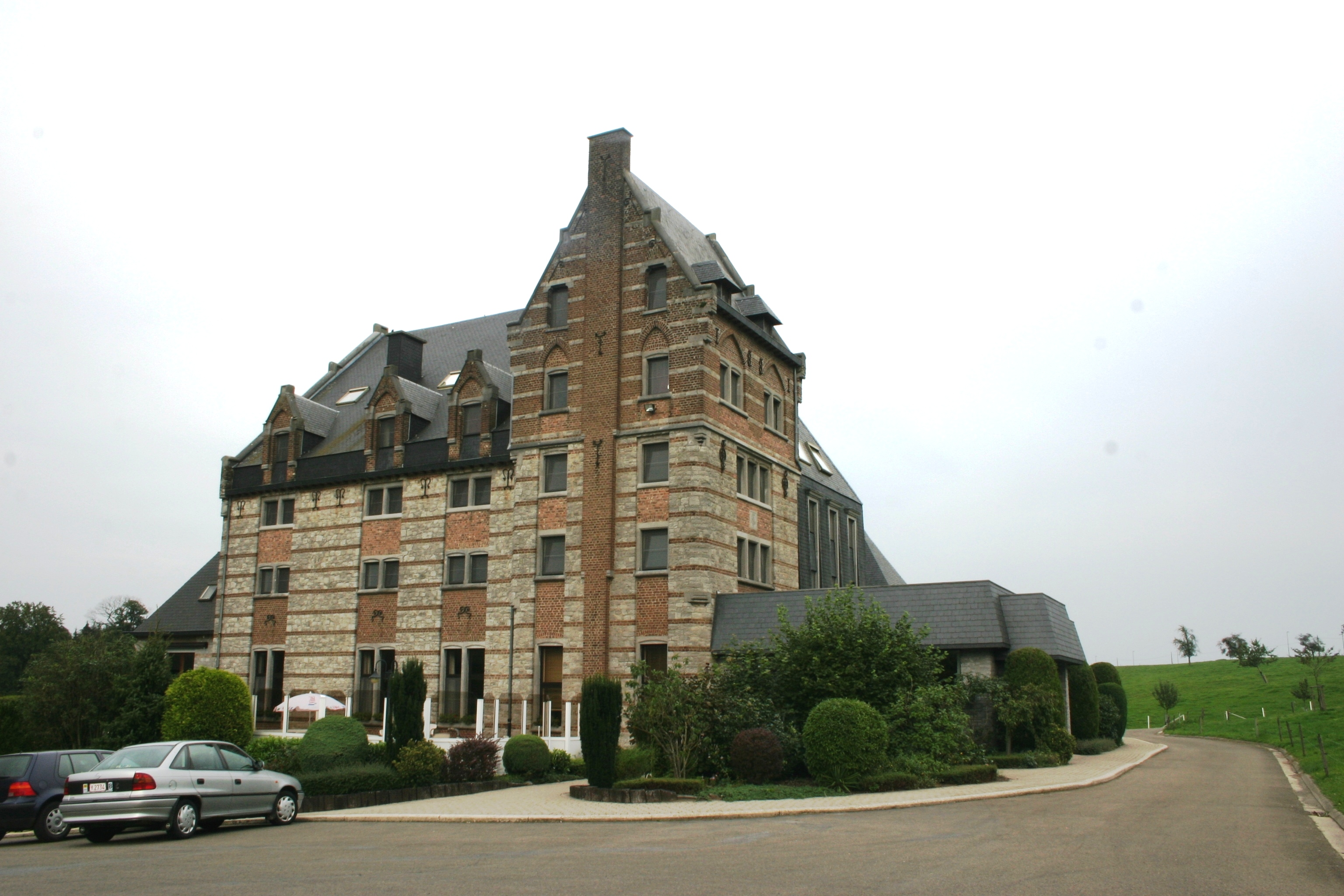
Castle Chaityfontaine near Banneux

Banneux (French pronunciation: [banø]) is a village of Wallonia in the municipality of Sprimont, district of Louveigné, located in the province of Liège, Belgium.

It is known because of the reported Marian apparitions of Our Lady of Banneux, also known as Our Lady of the Poor, to a young girl called Mariette Beco.

== Sources ==
- Belgian Tourist Office
