= Diocesan Seminary of Liège =

Educational institution

Coordinates: 50.637°N 5.574°E

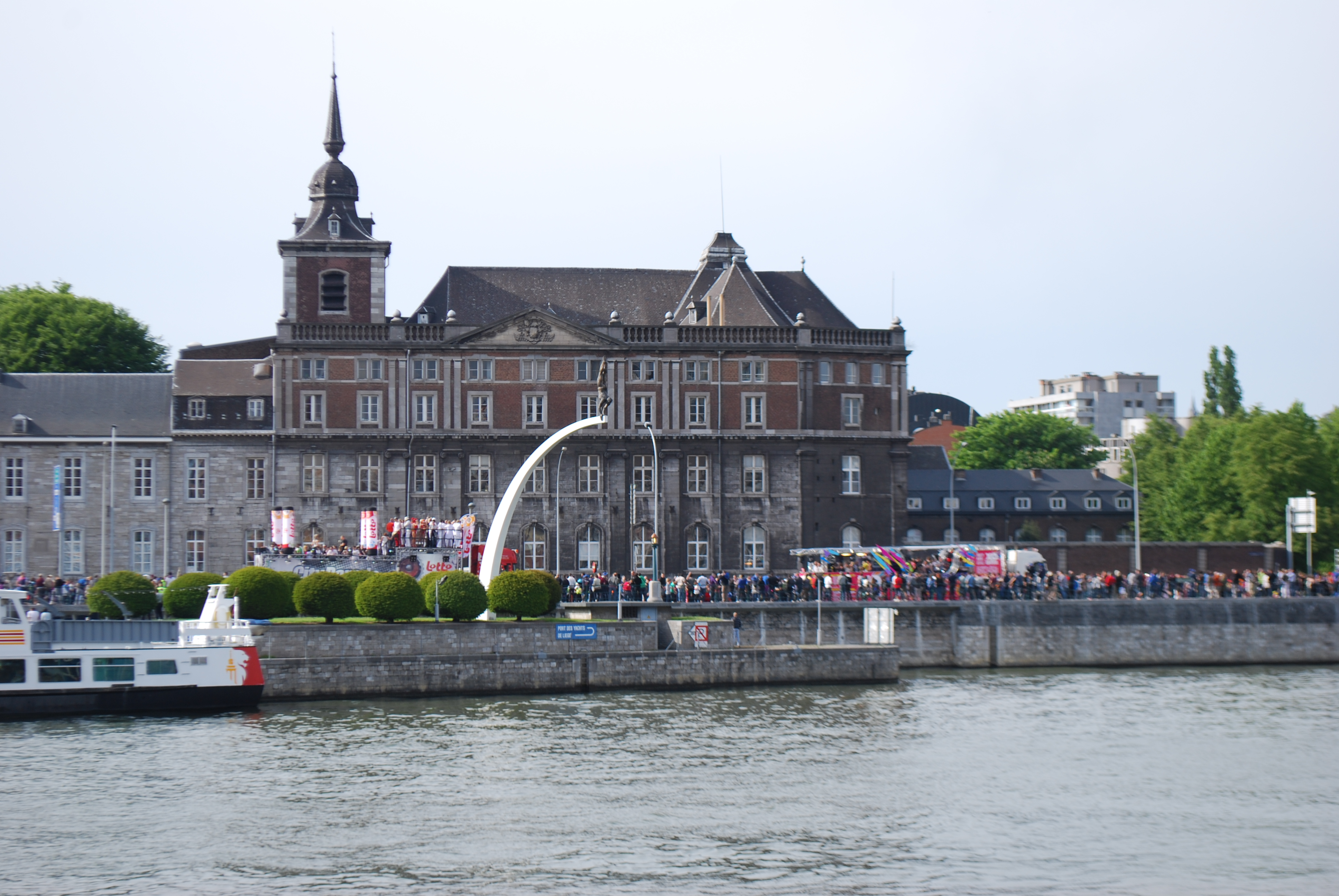
A view from across the Meuse (2012)

The Diocesan Seminary of Liège (in French: Séminaire épiscopal or Grand Séminaire de Liège), now also Espace Prémontrés, is an educational institution in the Diocese of Liège, founded in 1592.

== History ==
The seminary was first founded by Ernest of Bavaria in 1592 to train diocesan clergy in line with the decrees of the Council of Trent. The papal breve of foundation was dated 5 March 1592, and the seminary was formally opened on 28 May that year, in the buildings of the former Hôpital Saint-Mathieu. In 1605, the seminary opened a dependent college, Liège College, at the University of Leuven.

In 1786, after the suppression of the Society of Jesus, the seminary moved into the vacated premises of the Jesuit college. Teaching was suspended during the French period but resumed in 1814, and since 1815 the seminary has been based in the buildings of the former Beaurepart Abbey. The buildings are listed as immovable heritage. While candidates for the priesthood from the diocese of Liège have since 2010 been trained at the Seminary of Namur, the Séminaire épiscopal continues to function as a diocesan centre for training and education.

In 2014 the diocesan treasurer was charged with misappropriating funds from the seminary. In 2018 he was convicted of embezzling 689,000 euros.
