= Republic of Liège =

18th c. unrecognized republic in Europe

Republic of Liège République liégeoise (French)
- 1789–1791
- Flag

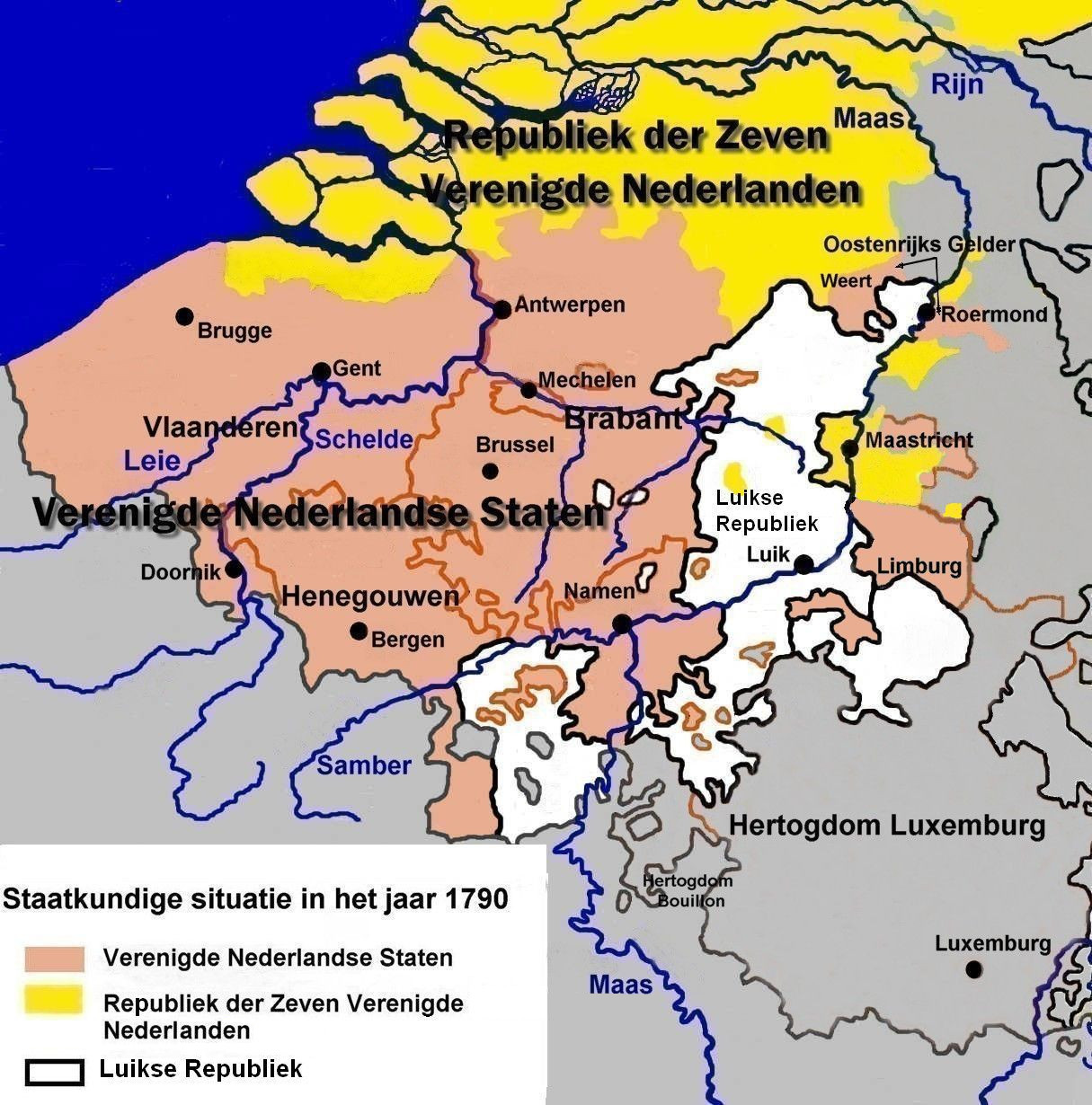
- The Republic of Liège in green
- Status: Unrecognized state
- Capital: Liège
- Common languages: French, Walloon, Limburgish
- Government: Revolutionary republic
- Historical era: Early modern period
  - Proclamation of the Republic: 18 August 1789
  - Declaration of the Rights of Man and Citizen of Franchimont: 16 September 1789
  - Restoration of the prince-bishopric: 12 January 1791
Preceded by	Succeeded by
Prince-Bishopric of Liège	Prince-Bishopric of Liège

The Republic of Liège (French: République liégeoise) was a short-lived revolutionary republic formed after the August 1789 revolution in the former Prince-Bishopric of Liège. It coexisted with the even more short-lived revolutionary state, the United Belgian States, created by the Brabant Revolution of 1789, to the north. By 1791, the forces of the republic had been defeated by Prussian and Austrian forces which restored the rule of the Prince-Bishop.

== Revolution ==
On 18 August 1789, Jean-Nicolas Bassenge and other democrats arrived at the Hôtel de Ville of Liège. They demanded the dismissal of current magistrates in favour of two popular burgomasters: Jacques-Joseph Fabry and Jean-Remy de Chestret. The citadel of Saint Walburge fell into the hands of the rebels. The Prince-Bishop, César-Constantin-François de Hoensbroeck, was brought back from his Summer Palace in Seraing to ratify the nomination of the new officials and to abolish the unpopular Règlement de 1684. Several days later, de Hoensbroeck fled to the city of Trier in modern Germany. The Holy Roman Empire condemned the Liège revolution and demanded the restoration of the ancien régime in the prince-bishopric.

The radical mood in Liège led to the proclamation of a republic, three years before France proclaimed itself a republic.

== Law ==
One of the first acts of the republic was the introduction of the "Declaration of the Rights of Man and Citizen of Franchimont" on 16 September 1789. The document was heavily influenced by the French Declaration of the Rights of Man and of the Citizen introduced in August 1789 but contained several important differences:

- Article 3: Sovereignty resides in the people [and not the nation]
- Article 10: Every citizen has freedom of thought and opinion [without restriction]
- Article 17 of the French declaration concerning property is absent because civil and legal rights in Liège relative to property had been in force since 1196.

== End of the Republic ==
From November 1789 to April 1790, Prussian troops occupied Liège and other major towns on a mission of mediation between the revolutionaries and the Westphalian Circle. Attempts at reconciliation failed, since the Liégeois demanded liberal reforms while Prince-Bishop Hoensbroeck, in exile, refused compromise. After restoring authority in the Austrian Netherlands, Leopold II intervened directly to reinstate the prince-bishopric.

Liégeois volunteers, marching to the patriotic song Valeureux Liégeois, were unable to halt the advance of Austrian forces. On 12 January 1791, imperial troops entered Liège, ending the republic and restoring the prince-bishop to power. Harsh reprisals followed: leading patriots were forced into exile—many in France—while their property was confiscated.

During the War of the First Coalition (1792–1793), Liégeois exiles supported the French conquest of the Low Countries. Austrian troops were finally expelled from the Liège region following their defeat at the Battle of Sprimont on 18 September 1794.
