= Liège Revolution =

1789–1791 revolt against clerical rule

- Part of the Atlantic Revolutions
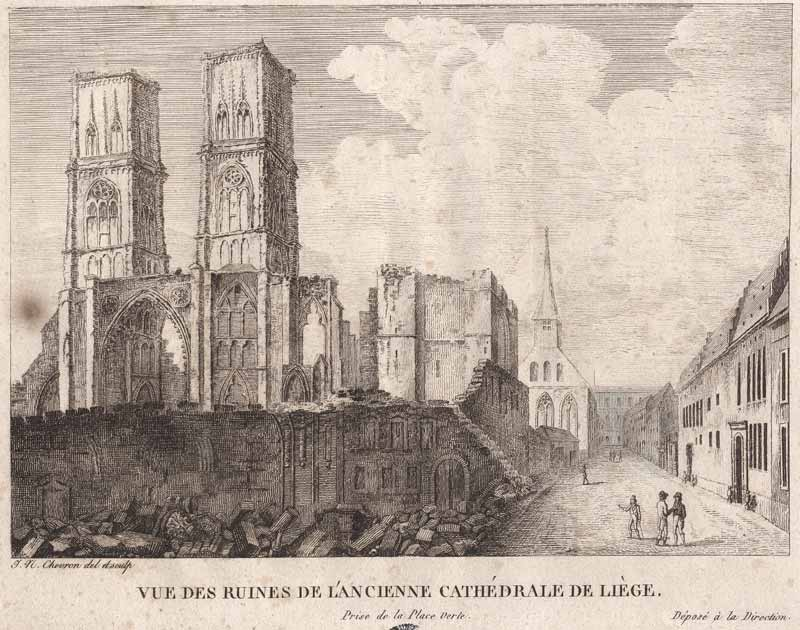
- Destruction of the Cathedral of Saint-Lambert by revolutionaries.
| Date | 18 August 1789 – 12 January 1791 |
| Location | City and province of Liège |
| Result | Foundation of Liège Republic (1789); reversion to Prince-Bishopric (1791); annexation by France (1795) |

Belligerents
| Liège rebels Republic of Liège (1789–1791); France (from 1791) Supported by: Prussia (from July 1790) | Prince-Bishops of Liège Holy Roman Empire: (Austrian Empire) Habsburg monarchy; Supported by: Prussia (1789–1790) |

Commanders and leaders
| Jean-Remy de Chestret; Jacques-Joseph Fabry; Jean-Nicolas Bassenge | César de Hoensbroeck (Holy Roman Empire) Emperor Leopold II |

The Liège Revolution, sometimes known as the Fortunate Revolution (French: Heureuse Révolution; Walloon: Binamêye revolucion), against the reigning prince-bishop of Liège, started on 18 August 1789 and lasted until the destruction of the Republic of Liège and re-establishment of the Prince-Bishopric of Liège by Austrian forces in 1791. The Liège Revolution was concurrent with the French Revolution and its effects were long-lasting and eventually led to the abolition of the Prince-Bishopric of Liège and its final annexation by French revolutionary forces in 1795.

== Timeline ==
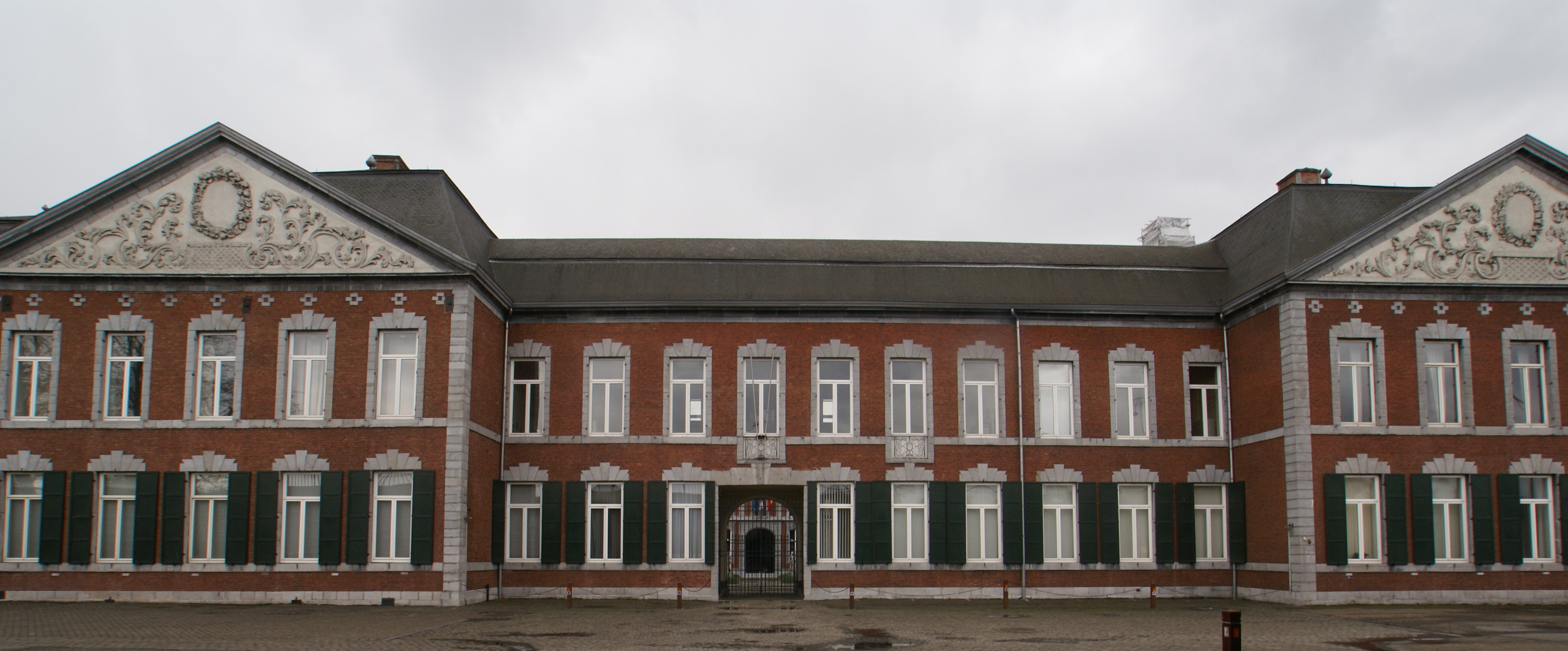
The prince-bishops' summer residence at Seraing

- 985: Otto II, Holy Roman Emperor, makes the bishop of the Roman Catholic Diocese of Liège, Notker of Liège, the prince of a new principality that overlaps with a portion of the large diocese – the Prince-Bishopric of Liège.
- 985–1772: Over the centuries, some of the prince-bishops of Liège expand the holdings of the principality, though it never reaches the full area of the diocese.
- 1772: Velbrück is made prince-bishop of Liège, he encourages the arts and new ideas until his death in 1784.
- 1784: Hoensbroeck replaces Velbrück as prince-bishop, he is much more authoritarian and reactionary than his predecessor.
- 1789: Revolution breaks out simultaneously in Paris and Liège. Hoensbroeck flees to Germany and the Liège Republic is proclaimed.
- 1791: First restoration – the Austrian army puts Hoensbroeck back in power and most supporters of the Republic go into exile in Paris.
- 1792: Hoensbroeck dies and is replaced by François-Antoine-Marie de Méan, who has to make a quick escape after the battle of Jemappes. This enables French troops under Dumouriez to take control of the Principality of Liège and the Austrian Netherlands.
- 1793: The citizens of Liège vote for the principality to be annexed by France, but the Austrians defeat the French at the Battle of Neerwinden and put a prince-bishop back in charge of Liège.
- 1794: In the battles of Fleurus and Sprimont, the French recapture the principality.
- 1795: The French National Convention endorses the principality's incorporation into France.

== Origins of discontent (1684–1789) ==
=== Political functioning of the principality ===
Since the Ruling of 1684 put in place by Maximilian Henry of Bavaria, in principle the prince-bishop of Liège had to govern the principality in agreement with the three estates – the first estate (upper clergy and canons of the cathédrale Saint-Lambert), the noble estate (15 families, intended to represent the whole countryside), and the third estate (representing the middle classes and artisans organised by 32 crafts).

The election of mayors and a council was made by the prince and the 32 crafts. These were split into 16 chambers, whose members were appointed for life, forming an electoral body. These chambers were made up of 20 nobles, patricians and 'rentiers', 10 notable merchants and 6 artisans. The commissioners of the craftsmen were themselves appointed by 28 commissioners, of whom 12 were appointed by the prince-bishop and 16 by the parishes. The third estate also included the representatives of the principality's 'bonnes villes', elected by 567 electors. Formed by the mayors of all these cities, they were almost completely obedient to the prince-bishop and the first estate and had completely lost the partial power they had from the 14th to 17th centuries. The lower clergy, minor nobility, industrial middle classes, workers and peasants had a limited part in public affairs, whilst the working classes' position was unenviable, with high poverty and unemployment causing rising support for political changes and social justice.

=== Enlightenment views on Liège ===
18th-century philosophers were far from unanimous in their opinion of the Principality of Liège. Some saw in the functioning of its state all the characteristics of a republic, while others saw the bishop's power as that of a tyrant. The chevalier de Jaucourt's account of Liège in the Encyclopédie states:

[Here there are] 32 artisans' colleges, who take some part in the government, and bear the ease of the city. [The Liège state shows itself] as a free republic, governed by mayors, by its senators and by other municipal magistrates. [Nevertheless] its number of churches, abbeys and monasteries considerably oppress it.

On the other side, Voltaire's criticism of Liège's government was sharp, writing in the Idée républicaines par un membre d’un corps, critique du Contrat social about Notker of Liège, the principality's founder:

It is an insult to reason and law to pronounce the words "civil and ecclesiastical government". When our bishop, made to serve not to be served, made to support the poor not devour their livelihood, made to catechise and not to dominate, ventures, in times of anarchy, is entitled the prince of the city of which he is not the pastor, he is manifestly culpable of rebellion and tyranny.

=== Velbruck: a first step towards the Enlightenment ===
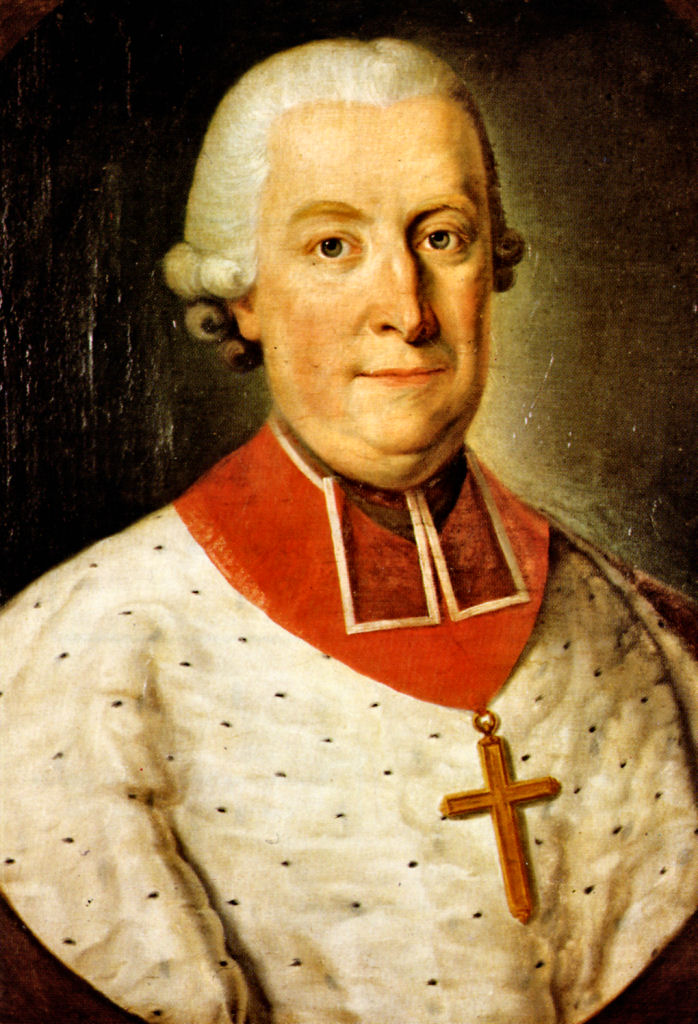
Portrait of Velbruck

On his election as prince-bishop in 1772, the pro-Enlightenment François-Charles de Velbruck (1772–1784) became head of an ecclesiastical principality that had become particularly backward in its intellectual life and its scientific and literary studies. He showed himself favourable to philosophers and the new ideas of the era. He acted as an enlightened despot like his contemporaries Frederick II of Prussia, Catherine II of Russia and Joseph II, Holy Roman Emperor. Like them, he did not lack for ideas, giving his imprimatur to philosophical writers banned from publication in France such as the Journal encyclopédique, on the condition that one copy of each book be deposited in Liège library.

To encourage a taste for arts, letters and sciences, he set up a public academy of painting, sculpture and engraving in 1774. In 1779 he founded the "Société libre d'Émulation" and the Société littéraire de Liège, as places for Liège's intelligentsia to meet each other and foreign scholars – they became a hotbed for later leaders of the revolution. The societies' activities included presentations of scientists', artists' and poets' works and discoveries. However, a lack of money and power meant that these projects did not always succeed – the principality showed a certain lethargy and narrowness of vision at this era which prevented real progress.

Velbrück's attempts to combat social problems like poverty or class inequality were many, but were unable to make a real effect on the deplorable situation. He tried to make changes in many areas, including public health, by setting up the Hôpital général Saint-Léonard to receive and assist the needy, a free midwifery course and establishments to deal with disease. He systematically gave the last rites to those condemned to death. At the start of his reign, Velbrück sought to put more equality into the tax system, thinking that all taxation had only one purpose, the public good – he failed to push this through, due to opposition from the privileged orders.

Velbrück also reformed education, making it accessible to all, regardless of gender or class, but setting up free charity schools for poor children and the 'Plan d'Education pour la Jeunesse du Pays de Liège', an education plan for the principality. He wanted to radically change the recently suppressed Jesuit schools' educational methods, orienting their teaching towards maths and the physical sciences, to provide its students with useful objectives for their critical judgement. He also planned to build a large public library.

=== Political and economic foment ===
Velbruck was succeeded as prince bishop in 1784 by César-Constantin-François de Hoensbroeck, hostile to any reform, whose authoritarian rule fanned the flames of revolution. He tried to roll back Velbruck's reforms and reestablish the privileges of the clergy and nobility, having no sympathy for the liberal aspirations of the third estate or for his people's sufferings. He made himself highly unpopular and the principality's inhabitants nicknamed him 'the tyrant of Seraing' after the prince-bishops' summer residence.

The principality was also undergoing a strong demographic change. Its population increased by about 60 per cent between 1700 and 1785, to 600,000. This included 60,000 in the city of Liège itself, comparable in size to the populations of Antwerp and Ghent and only slightly smaller than that of Brussels. The young population was particularly large, a factor in the later revolution. The principality's middle classes violently opposed Hoensbroeck's regime, criticising his system as unrepresentative and parasitic, particularly in exempting the nobility and upper clergy from taxation. In 1787, one of the middle class's leaders, Fabry, proposed the abolition of indirect taxation affecting the middle classes and the poor, proposing instead that a tax on financiers' fortunes be set up. He also denounced the mismanagement of the city, a quarter of whose revenues were used to pay off debt.

Moreover, the middle classes opposed the third estate's submission to the prince-bishop. Their political programme proposed the establishment of a constitutional monarchy, as emerges from a text by Jean-Nicolas Bassenge, a future revolutionary:

Inhabitants of Liége, you are a free people! A people is free when it only obeys the laws that it gives itself by the consent of all the individuals of which it is composed or by [the consent] of those representatives elected and authorised by them – so a people is only free when sovereignty, legislative power, resides in the whole nation. The head clerk of the nation, its head and not its master, is the organ of the national will. A member of sovereignty when he makes laws, he is only delegated to execute them. He has them promulgated when all consent – but he is only the organ and not the interpreter – he cannot publish or change them – he cannot even put them into execution beyond the prescribed norms.

For their part, despite benefitting from their tax exemption, the nobles also began opposing the prince-bishop and upper clergy, since they had been practically cut off from power. Revolutionary proclamations began to circulate, including under the titles:

- With ardour, trample down slavery now.
- You shall grant no more tax if you have no representation.
- You shall clearly know the cause and use of these taxes.
- You shall never pay to fatten the lazy.
- You shall form good but simple laws, without deceit.
- As for the clergy, you shall boldly suppress all its useless members.
- And from its hands you shall take back the superfluous goods in the fields.
- You shall irrevocably purge the land of despots.
- Aux gens de loi tu couperas les ongles radicalement. ("You will radically cut the claws of the lawyers")
- Aux maltotiers tu donneras congé radicalement. ("You will radically "give leave" (= get rid of?) those who exact the maltôte tax")
- Ton estime tu garderas pour les vertus non-pour l’argent. ("You will keep your esteem for the virtues and not for money")
- Aux dignités tu placeras des gens de bien soigneusement. ("To dignities you will place people very carefully.")
- Et sans grâce tu puniras tout pervers indistinctement. ("And without grace you will punish all wrongdoers equally")
- Ainsi faisant tu détruiras tous les abus absolument. ("Thus doing, you will destroy all abuses absolutely")
- Et de l’esclavage tu deviendras heureux et libre assurément. Ainsi soit-il ("And you will become assuredly happy and free from slavery") "

On the eve of the revolution both town and country dwellers were suffering from an economic crisis. The price of bread was rising and the cities saw high unemployment. In Verviers, where 25% of the population was out of work, the situation had become a catastrophe. In the countryside, the clergy and peasant communities engaged in lawsuits with each other for not paying their tithes to maintain churches, schools and cemeteries – J. Lejeune states that 10% to 11% of labour output was given in tithes to the chapters and abbeys of Liège and Huy. The peasants also sought redress against the nobility, who required maintenance money, and against the middle classes, who appropriated common land. All classes were also disgusted by the export of grain, which worsened the famine in the principality – in 1787–1788 75% of the principality's grain was exported.

Under the rule of Joseph II, Holy Roman Emperor, the Austrian Netherlands which bordered Liège underwent several reforms seeking to weaken the clergy's control on the state. In 1781 an edict of tolerance ended Catholicism's status as state religion and allowed Protestants and Jews to worship freely and work in civil service and government posts. In 1782 an imperial ordnance suppressing "useless religious congregations" (i.e. contemplative orders) was promulgated, reasserting state control over the church. The clergy could now no longer criticise the state and bishops had to take a civil oath. Joseph also allowed civil marriage and divorce and abolished heresy as a crime, establishing liberty of conscience and allowing his subjects to attend non-Catholic schools.

The emperor's own subjects did not like these reforms and began the Brabant Revolution in 1787, partly in opposition to the reforms and partly to the authoritarian fashion in which they had been imposed. Yet in the Principality of Liège these reforms were much discussed, with its middle classes wanting the same.

=== The gambling-house at Spa ===
In the 18th century, especially from 1750 onwards, the spa-town of Spa saw great success as a travel destination, seeing princes and crowned heads arrive there every season. High-class bobelins came to its twenty springs seeking a cure from England, France, the Netherlands, Prussia and Italy and Spa became known as the 'café de l'Europe'. Among the town's attractions were its gambling houses. The La Redoute assembly rooms opened there in 1763 as Europe's first modern casino, and in competition Spa's 'Waux-Hall' (named after Vauxhall Gardens near London) opened its doors in 1770 despite the exclusive patent banning gambling which it had initially been granted by prince-bishop John Theodore of Bavaria. In 1774 the two gambling houses stopped competing and merged, participating in Spa's naming as the Café de l'Europe in 1781.

A third house was built in 1785, founded by the nobleman Noel-Joseph Levoz, putting privilege in question again. This arrival caused political discussions then criticism of the Ancien Régime. Levoz accused his competitors' privileges as illegal and took the affair before the Tribunal des XXII and then before the Reichskammergericht at Wetzlar. In June 1787 Hoensbroeck sent 200 men and two canons to Spa to shut down Levoz's gambling house. This event, and the long trial which resulted, were the pretext for a rise in opposition to Hoensbroeck, then the outbreak of the French Revolution in July 1789 provided the final trigger for Liège's own revolution.

== Course ==
=== Revolution (1789–1791) ===
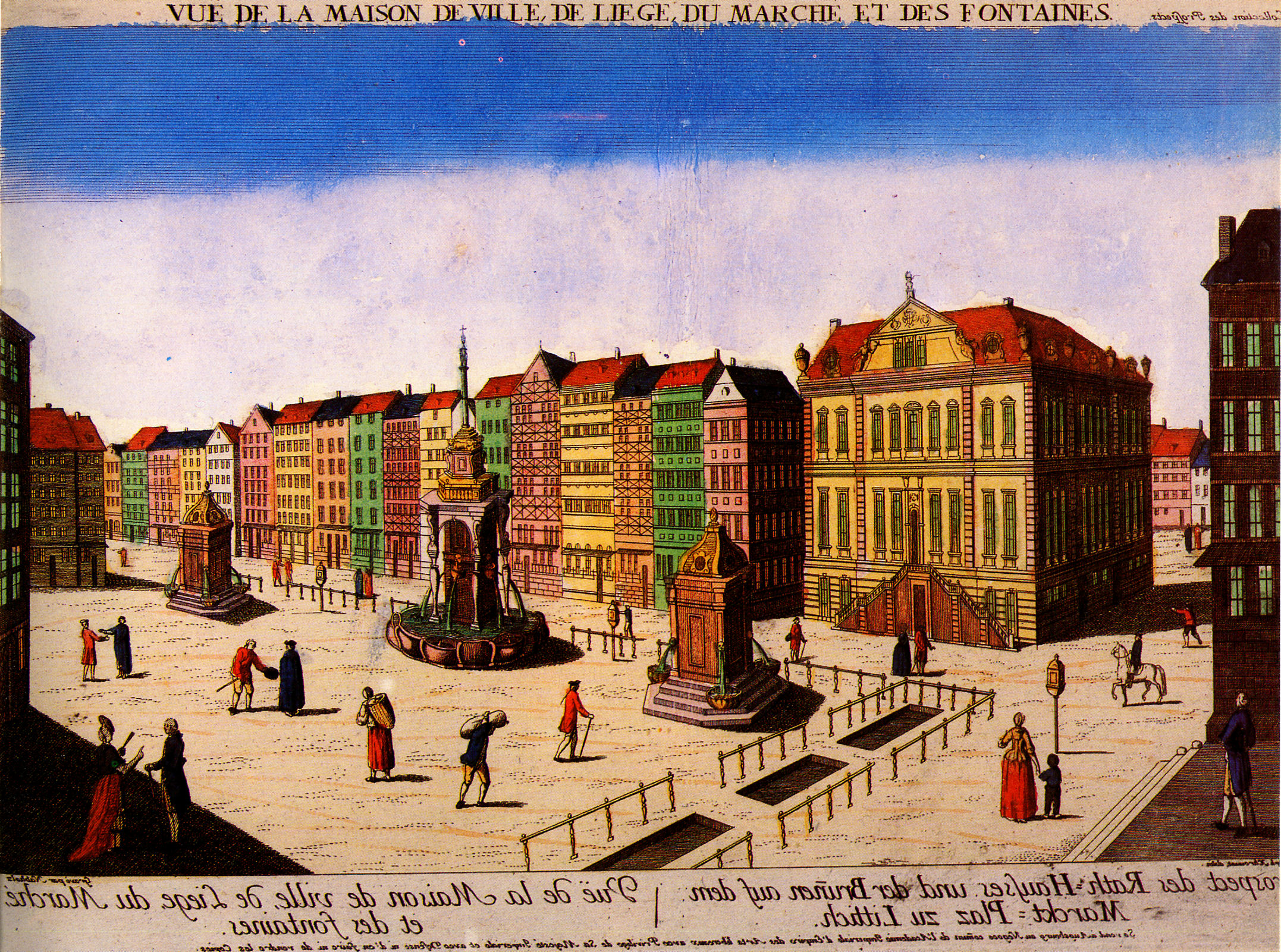
The place du Marché and the city hall of Liège in the mid-18th century

On 18 August 1789, Jean-Nicolas Bassenge and other democrats met at the hôtel de ville, demanding the magistrates' dismissal and their replacement with the popular mayors Jacques-Joseph Fabry and Jean-Remy de Chestret. The citadel of Sainte-Walburge fell to the insurgents and Hoensbroeck was dragged from his summer palace at Seraing to ratify the election of the new aediles and to abolish the 1684 ruling. However, this was only a ruse and some days later the prince-bishop fled to Trier in Germany. The Holy Roman Empire's tribunal condemned the Liège Revolution and ordered the re-imposition of the ancien régime in the principality.

Meanwhile, the insurgent nature of the Revolution was such that the principality was abolished and a republic created, two years before France did likewise. The Estates of the former principality prepared a constitution, including equal taxation for all, the election of deputies by the people and freedom of work. A 'Déclaration des droits de l'homme et du citoyen de Franchimont' was also adopted on 16 September 1789 – though largely inspired by France's Declaration of the Rights of Man and of the Citizen (voted into law 20 days earlier), it did contain some significant differences:

- Article 3: Sovereignty resided in the people not the nation
- Article 10: Every citizen was free in thought and opinions (with no other restrictions)
- Article 17, concerning property, was left out, since the civil and individual rights of the inhabitants of the new republic, including those related to property, had already been sacrosanct since 1196 (Charte d'Albert de Cuyck).

From November 1789 to April 1790 the Prussians occupied the city of Liège and other major towns in the principality, having been put in charge of mediating between the revolutionaries and the Lower Rhenish–Westphalian Circle. However, it proved impossible to reconcile the people's liberal aspirations with the stubborn authoritarianism of the still-exiled Hoensbroeck. Leopold II, Holy Roman Emperor recaptured the Austrian Netherlands and then intervened to reestablish episcopal power in its entirety.

=== First Restoration (1791–1792) ===
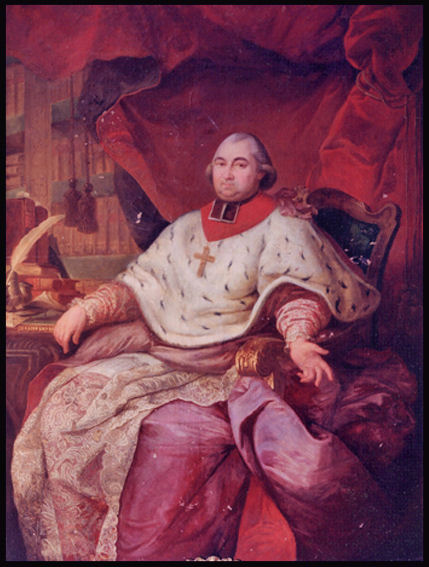
François-Antoine-Marie de Méan, last prince-bishop of Liège

Liège's volunteer Republican troops (singing the "Valeureux Liégeois" by Abbot Gilles-Joseph-Evrard Ramoux) were clearly unable to contain the Austrian army, which entered Liège on 12 January 1791. Hoensbroeck thus recovered his throne and took several reprisals, confiscating the Liège democrats' goods and properties and forcing most of them to flee to France. It was among these exiles that revolutionary France found its keenest supporters. Hoensbroeck became known by his people as 'the tyrant of Seraing' and his rigours and mistakes from 1791 to 1792 created a state of foment and good conditions for France to take over Liège, which had been a pro-French state since the 15th century and where the Enlightenment had been spread by French publishers such as Pierre Rousseau. Hoensbroeck died on 3 June 1792 and was succeeded by François-Antoine-Marie de Méan. On 21 September 1792 France, already at war with Austria and Prussia, abolished its monarchy. The war soon spread into what is now Belgium, including Liège.

=== First French period (1792–1793) ===
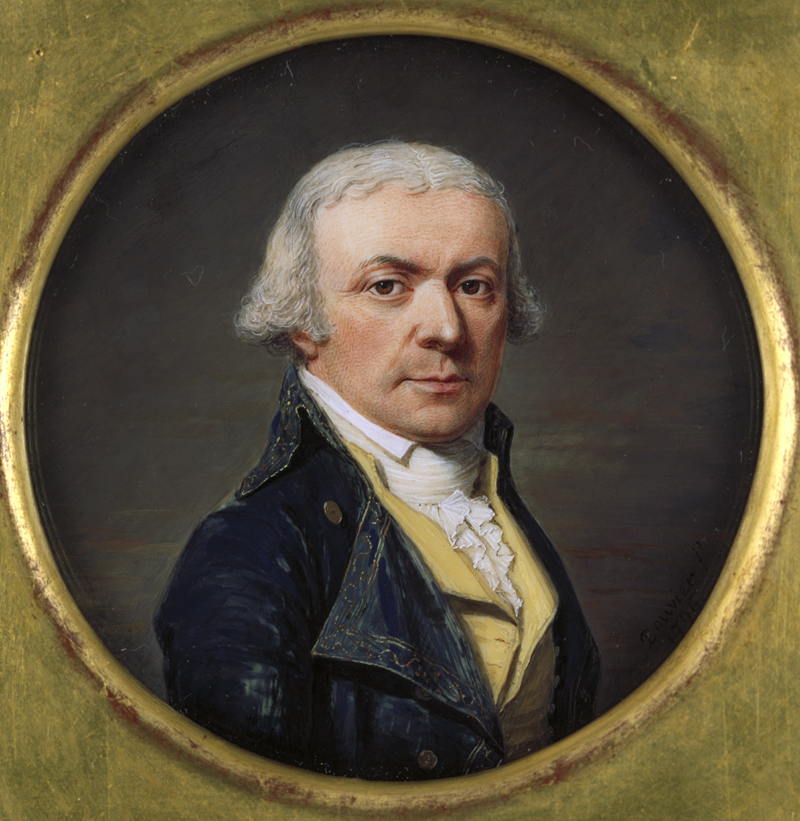
General Dumouriez

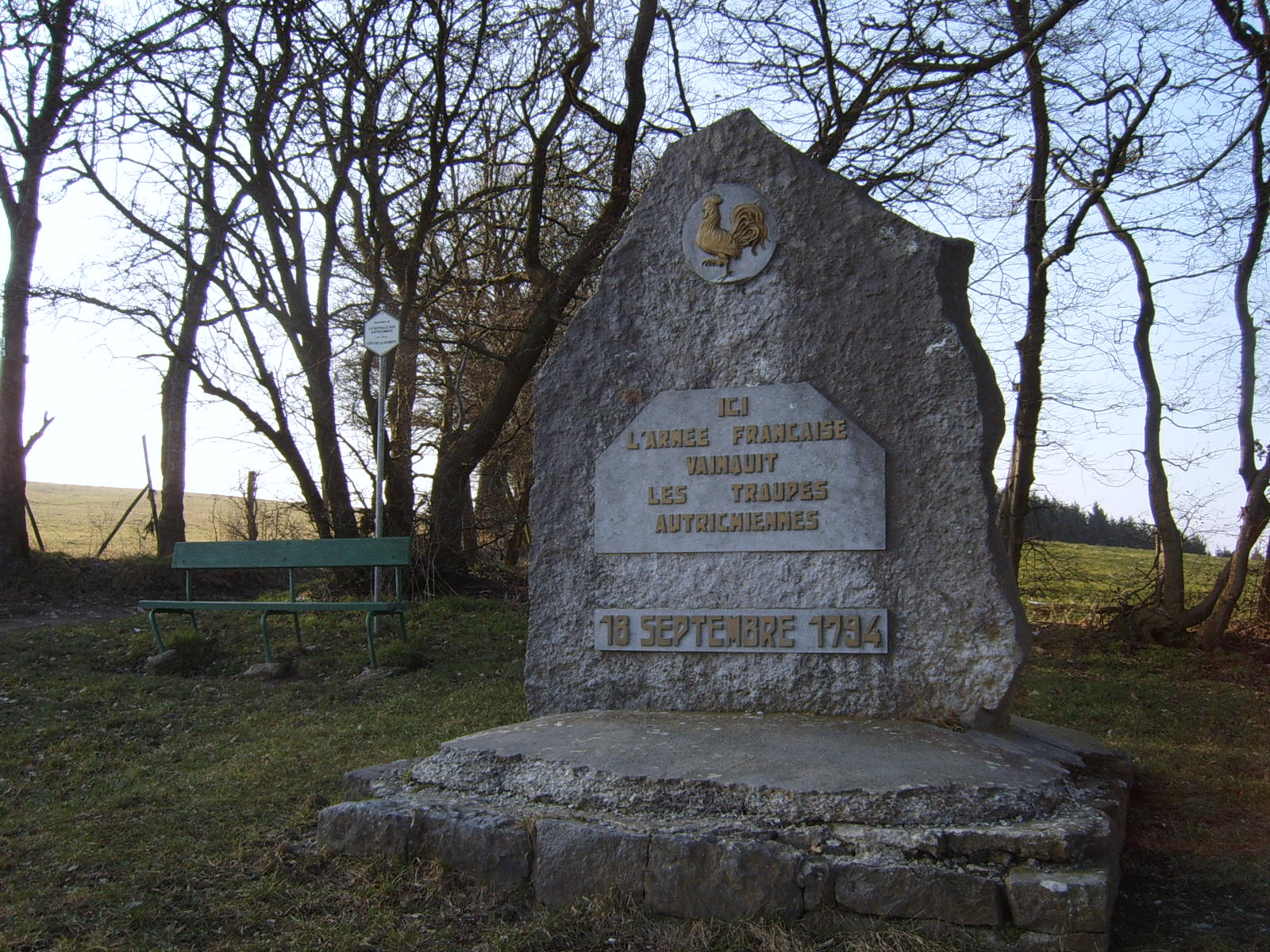
Monument on the site of the Redoute, site of the battle of Sprimont on 17 September 1794

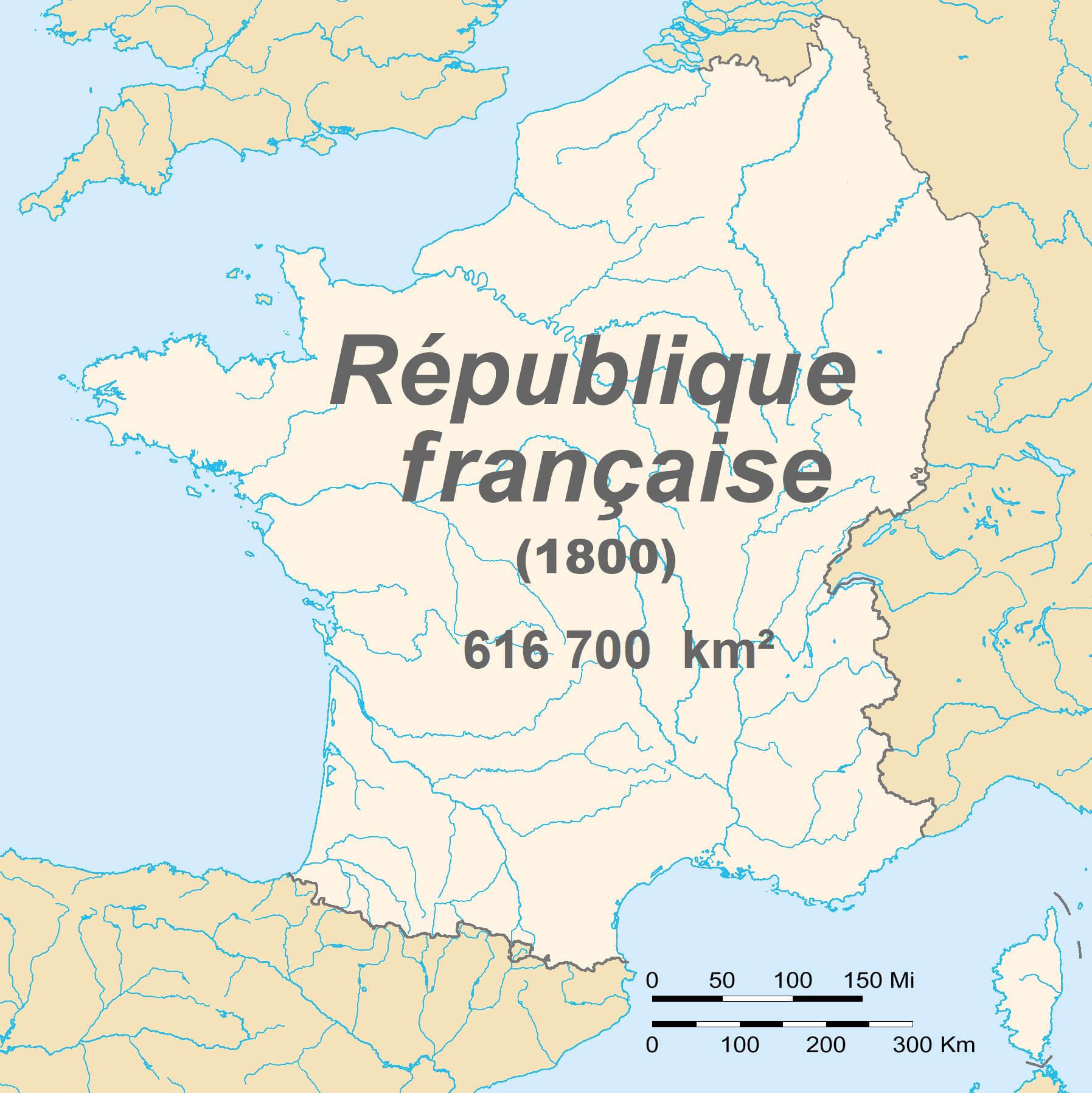
The French First Republic in 1800

On 6 November 1792 the French general Dumouriez, inflicted a heavy defeat on the Austrians in the battle of Jemappes – he then entered Liège on 28 November, amidst popular enthusiasm, though the Flemish towns were more muted in their enthusiasm. The Liège liberals exiled by Hoensbroeck's return reentered the city with the French army and François-Antoine-Marie de Méan fled. More important than these shows of enthusiasm, however, was the effective contribution the French now gained for the first time from the population and its leaders, such as the establishment of a new assembly by universal suffrage.

=== Plebiscite for annexation by France ===
The French presence allowed political societies to re-form – these included the société des amis de la Liberté. Even if these Liège societies played a major role in getting Liège to vote for annexation by France, the initiative for that move belonged to the pays de Franchimont.

Jean-Nicolas Bassenge was put in charge of writing a report, which was then discussed, approved and distributed and which formed the basis on which the municipality of Liège went to the vote. According to him, the former principality of Liège had decided to split from the Holy Roman Empire and thus had no other solution available but to merge with France. In effect in 1792, it was unthinkable that the principality remain independent. The revolutionaries no longer wanted the Ancien Régime and its split from the Duchy of Brabant was not yet complete – if Liège wanted to avoid being crushed by the Austrians, uniting with France was her only option. The report also gave the conditions on which the municipality voted for a merger.

The elections were open to all men who had reached the age of 18. By voter numbers, elections in the former principality of Liège seem to have been freer and more important than in the Austrian Netherlands. In the city of Liège 9700 voters registered, representing 50% of the effective foreseeable electorate. There were 40 'no' votes, 748 votes for a conditional merger, 1548 for a merger pure and simple, and the others for a merger with some of the conditions. Notable features are the massive 'yes' vote and the considerable electoral participation, when participation was not compulsory. Even so, it must be remembered that many opponents of the move preferred to abstain from the vote. This was compared to 3,000 voters in Mons and 2,000 in Ghent during the elections in the former Austrian Netherlands.

It could be said that Liège's 1793 elections were representative of opinion in the principality, though this derived as much from the historic circumstances of the conflicts between the Ancien Régime and the Republic as it did to Liège's marked Francophilia. The 1789 Liège revolution explains the disagreement between the inhabitants of Liège and their French occupiers and the differences in the treatment of its inhabitants by the French. The Brabant Revolution was against the reforming despotism of Joseph II, Holy Roman Emperor, where that in Liège and that in France itself were both aimed at profoundly modifying the social and political system of the Ancien Régime.

=== Second Restoration (1793–1794) ===
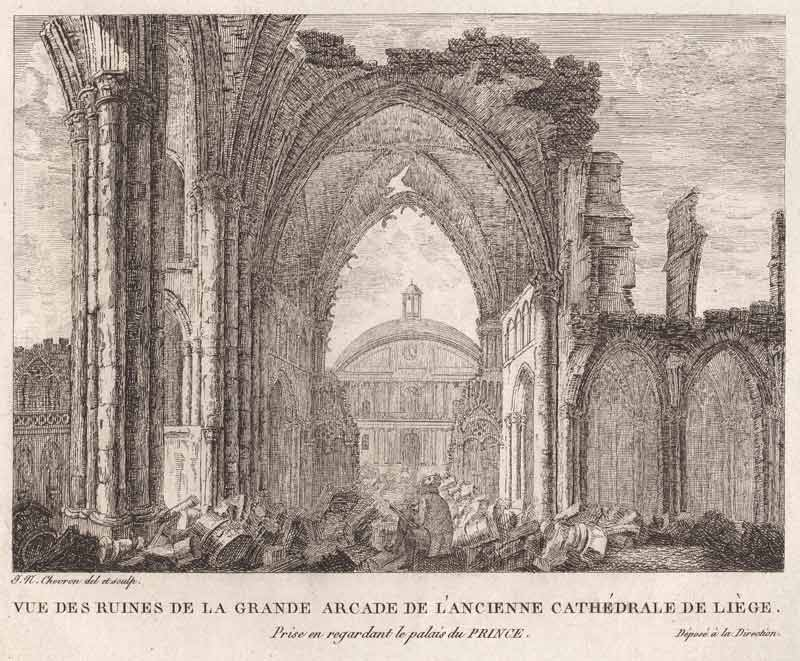
The Saint Lambertus cathedral during its destruction in 1794.

Coat of arms of Liège as a 'Bonne ville', first class under the First French Empire.

In March the French army was beaten at Neerwinden. The Austrians then reinstated the prince-bishop, but this restoration was to prove short-lived. On 26 June 1794 the French Republican troops defeated the Austrians at Fleurus. On 27 July 1794 the Austrian troops left Liège after bombarding and burning the Amercœur district. The last prince-bishop, François-Antoine-Marie de Méan, went into exile. The battle of Sprimont on 17 September at Fontin, between Esneux and Aywaille, was the last battle before the former principality was finally conquered. One of the sides of the Liège–Bastogne–Liège cycling course, La Redoute, takes its name from a fortified position involved in this battle.

=== Second French period (1794–1815) ===
The first French occupation of Liège (1792–1793) had been full of hope for those of its inhabitants attached to Liège's independence, but the military dangers it had undergone in the meantime made Liège aware of the dangerous of isolation. Illusions of independence thus rapidly disappeared upon the second French occupation (1794–95), with the country dismembered and considered as conquered territory by France, which was then at the height of the Reign of Terror. That second occupation ended in the rapid integration of the principality's Walloon territories into France itself, which lasted from 1795 until 1814.

In 1795, the National Convention decreed Liège's annexation following a vote for such action by the inhabitants of Liége, splitting it into three departments called Ourthe, Meuse-Inférieure and Sambre-et-Meuse. This meant Liége disappeared as a single entity, though the three new departments were loyal to France, unlike the other 'départements réunis'. This action was codified in 1801 by the Concordat of 1801 between Bonaparte]] and pope Pius VII. Bonaparte visited Liège in 1803, on which occasion Ingres painted a portrait of him (entitled Bonaparte, First Consul) to offer to the city. Baron Charles Emmanuel Micoud d'Umons became prefect of Ourthe in 1806, and remained so until 1814 and the end of the annexation. After Napoleon's defeat by the Sixth Coalition, the Coalition powers decided at the Congress of Vienna to award Ourthe to the Kingdom of the Netherlands.

== Historiography ==
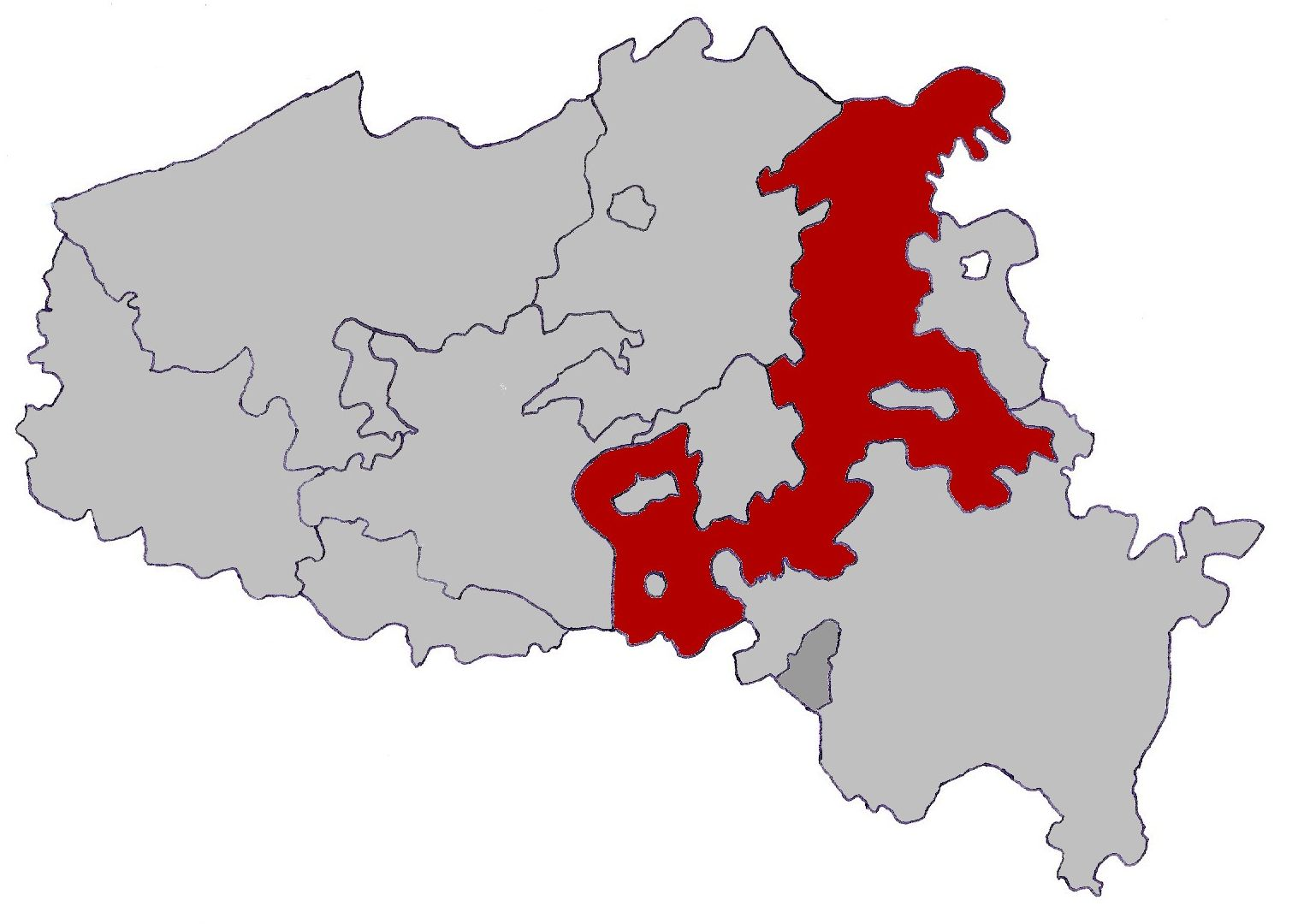
The principality (red) cut the Austrian Netherlands (grey) in two.

According to Hervé Hasquin, the Liège Revolution mirrored the French Revolution or even formed part of it. Both revolutions began in 1789 and in Hasquin's interpretation the Liège Revolution continued after the prince-bishop's temporary return – he sees a second phase with the entry of French revolutionary troops into Liège in 1792, and a third phase in 1794 with the French's second return. In this interpretation the Liège Revolution only ended in 1795 with the disappearance of the principality and its annexation by France. During this phase the Revolution had several extreme episodes, such as the demolition of the cathédrale Saint-Lambert by the city's revolutionaries. The principality's inhabitants were given universal male suffrage for the first time and also voted in a plebiscite for the French annexation.

Other historians see the revolution as occurring during the prince-bishop's absence between his departure on the night of 26–27 August 1789 and his return on 12 February 1791. In this interpretation, the Liège Revolution was a counterpart to the Brabant Revolution in the Austrian Netherlands, which was crushed. Even so, this interpretation carries a contradiction – the Liège Revolution and French Revolution both aimed to ask deeply egalitarian questions about the political and social order, whereas the Brabant Revolution hinged on contesting and rejecting the egalitarian reforms of Joseph II, Holy Roman Emperor. The Liège Revolution led to France's annexation of the principality, meaning that its inhabitants took no part in the Brabant Revolution or the United States of Belgium.
