= Jean-Nicolas Bassenge =

Jean-Nicolas or Nicolas Bassenge (24 November 1758, in Liège – 16 July 1811) was a politician from the Principality of Liège. He was active in the Liège Revolution then the French Revolution.

== Life ==
=== Youth ===
From an upper-middle-class family, he studied at the collège at Visé, headed by the Oratorians. In 1781 he prepared La Nymphe de Spa for abbé Raynal, a letter in which he made an apologia for Enlightenment philosophy. This brought him much difficulty, despite the protection he enjoyed from the prince-bishop François-Charles de Velbrück. Exhausted by the minor persecutions his poetry suffered, he left for Paris, where he became friends with the most famous writers of the era. After Velbrück's death, conflict broke out between the new prince-bishop César-Constantin-François de Hoensbroeck and the people of his principality. Putting his pen at the service of his fellow citizens, Bassenge published pro-liberal pamphlets and at the same time studied the history of Liège, giving extracts of his historical research in his Lettres à l'abbé de P... (1787–1789).

=== Revolution ===
An ardent defender of republican ideas, Bassenge returned to his birthplace on the outbreak of the revolution there in 1789, to support the insurgents. There he was elected as a deputy for the third estate in the conferences of the three orders and he, Fabry and Chestret quickly became the leaders of the liberal forces ranged against the prince-bishop. The Estates put him in charge of pleading their case before the imperial Reichskammergericht at Wetzlar, then in Berlin and finally at the congress of Frankfurt - he failed in his mission. The Société des amis de la liberté et de l'égalité de Liège then gave him the task of editing a report on the question of a merger with France, in which he supported such action. In December 1790 the Austrians reinstated the prince-bishop in Liège. Bassenge was excluded from the resulting amnesty and had to flee to France again, with many of his fellow liberals. In Paris he was put in charge of drafting the proposal for Liège's merger with France and then presenting it to the National Convention. At Sedan in 1791 he prepared an address from the inhabitants of Liège to Leopold II, Holy Roman Emperor, in which he protested against his arbitrary reaction to the Liège revolution.

In 1792 Bassenge returned to Liège with Charles François Dumouriez's French troops, which had captured the principality of Liège and the Austrian Netherlands from the Austrians, but the French defeat at the battle of Neerwinden forced him back into exile in France until 1795. Whilst in Paris from 1792 to 1795 he allied himself with the Girondins and was imprisoned and threatened with the guillotine during the Reign of Terror, until the Liége exiles intervened in his favour and won him Robespierre's support. On his release he returned to Liège on France's final annexation of it in 1795, becoming commissioner general to the executive directory within the departmental administration of Ourthe (one of the three departments created from Liège). In 1798 he was elected to represent that department in the Council of the Five Hundred in Paris (on which his younger brother also served - that brother later became sous-préfet for Montmédy and a member of the Corps législatif). Like many moderate republicans, he supported the 18 brumaire coup which brought Bonaparte and had no notion that Bonaparte would later make himself emperor. He gained a seat on the Corps législatif and defended his republican ideas in the Décade philosophique, a scientific and literary journal headed by Pierre-Louis Ginguené and Amaury Duval.

=== Retirement and death ===
He then retired from political life in 1802 and returned to his birthplace, where he was made curator of the city library. He was also a member of the Société d'émulation de Liège. He died unmarried on 16 July 1811 and his permanent secretary spoke his funeral elogy on 12 September that year. Bassenge's poems, letters and stories were posthumously published in two volumes as Loisirs de trois amis by his friends Henkart and Regnier in 1822.
