= Royal Academy of Fine Arts =

Royal Academy of Fine Arts may refer to:

- Royal Academy of Fine Arts (Antwerp), Belgium
- Royal Academy of Fine Arts (Brussels), Belgium
- Royal Academy of Fine Arts (Ghent), Belgium
- Royal Academy of Fine Arts of Liège, Belgium
- Royal Academy of Art (The Hague), Netherlands
- Royal Danish Academy of Fine Arts, Denmark
- Royal Swedish Academy of Fine Arts, Sweden
- Academy of Fine Arts Vienna, Austria
- Academy of Fine Arts Zagreb, Croatia
- Academy of Fine Arts, Munich, Germany
- Accademia di Belle Arti di Roma, Italy
- Dresden Academy of Fine Arts, Germany
- Hungarian University of Fine Arts, Budapest, Hungary, formerly the Hungarian Royal Drawing School
- Prussian Academy of Arts, Germany
- Real Academia de Bellas Artes de San Carlos de Valencia, Valencia, Spain
- Real Academia de Bellas Artes de San Fernando, Madrid, Spain
- Reial Acadèmia Catalana de Belles Arts de Sant Jordi, Barcelona, Spain
