= Société littéraire de Liège =

Literary society in Liege

Coordinates: 50°38′37.55″N 5°34′19.97″E

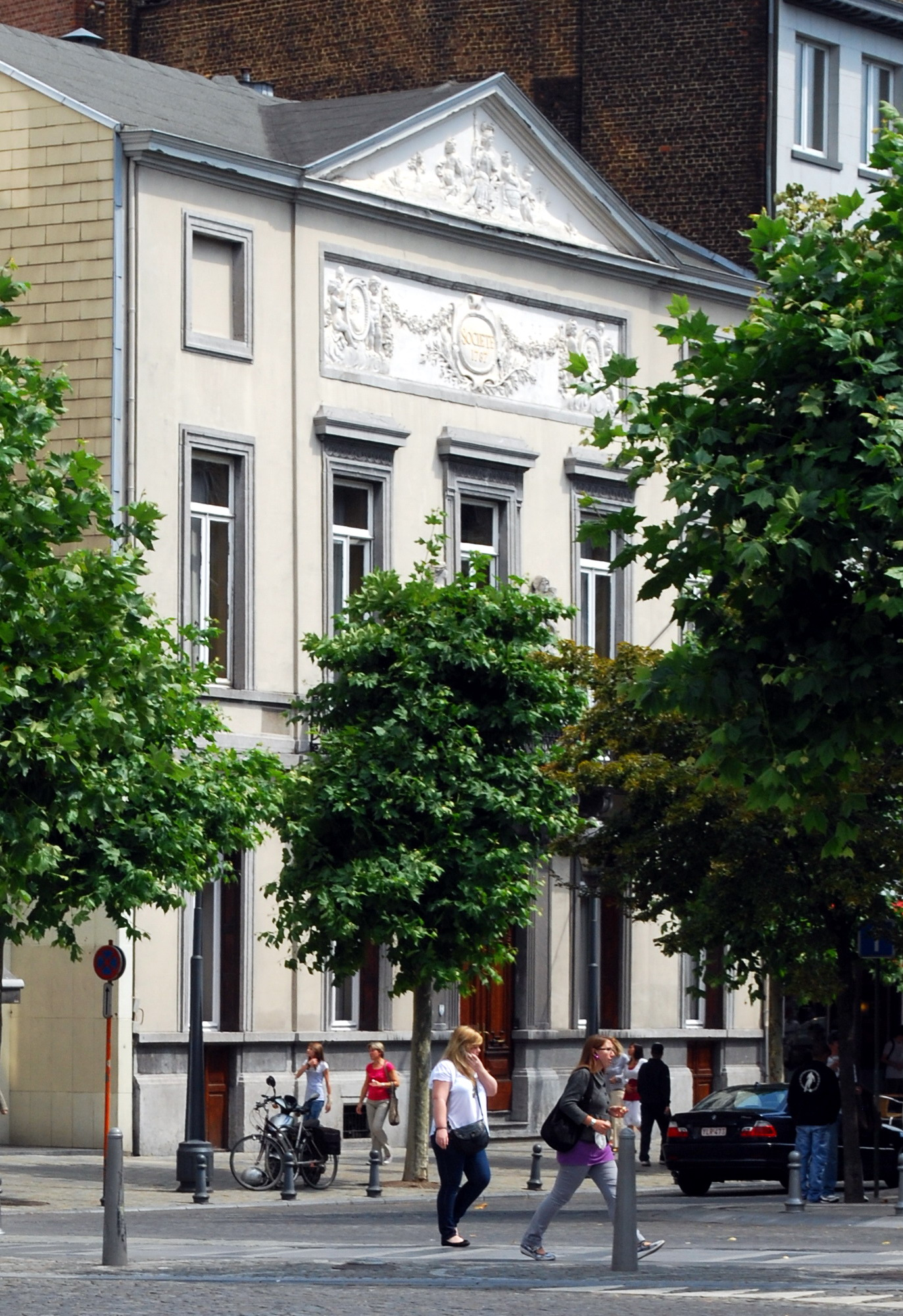
The House of the Literary Society of Liège

The Société littéraire de Liège is a literary society in Liège.

It was set up on 5 April 1779 by François-Charles de Velbrück during his reign as prince bishop of Liege. It aimed to provide its members with newspapers and books in a convivial atmosphere, on the model of other literary societies of the time, like the Cabinet littéraire de Verviers, the Société littéraire de Huy, the Société royale littéraire de Hasselt, the Cercle de l’Union de Maastricht, the "Aachener Casino Club" in Aachen, the Société littéraire de Gand, the Société de littérature de Bruxelles (whose successor, the Société des Douze, is still active), and the famous Gabinetto Vieusseux.

It is still active and provides cultural activities and meeting for its members. It has reciprocal ties with the Cercle Gaulois in Brussels and publishes a quarterly newsletter entitled Lettre de la Littéraire.
