= Valeureux Liégeois =

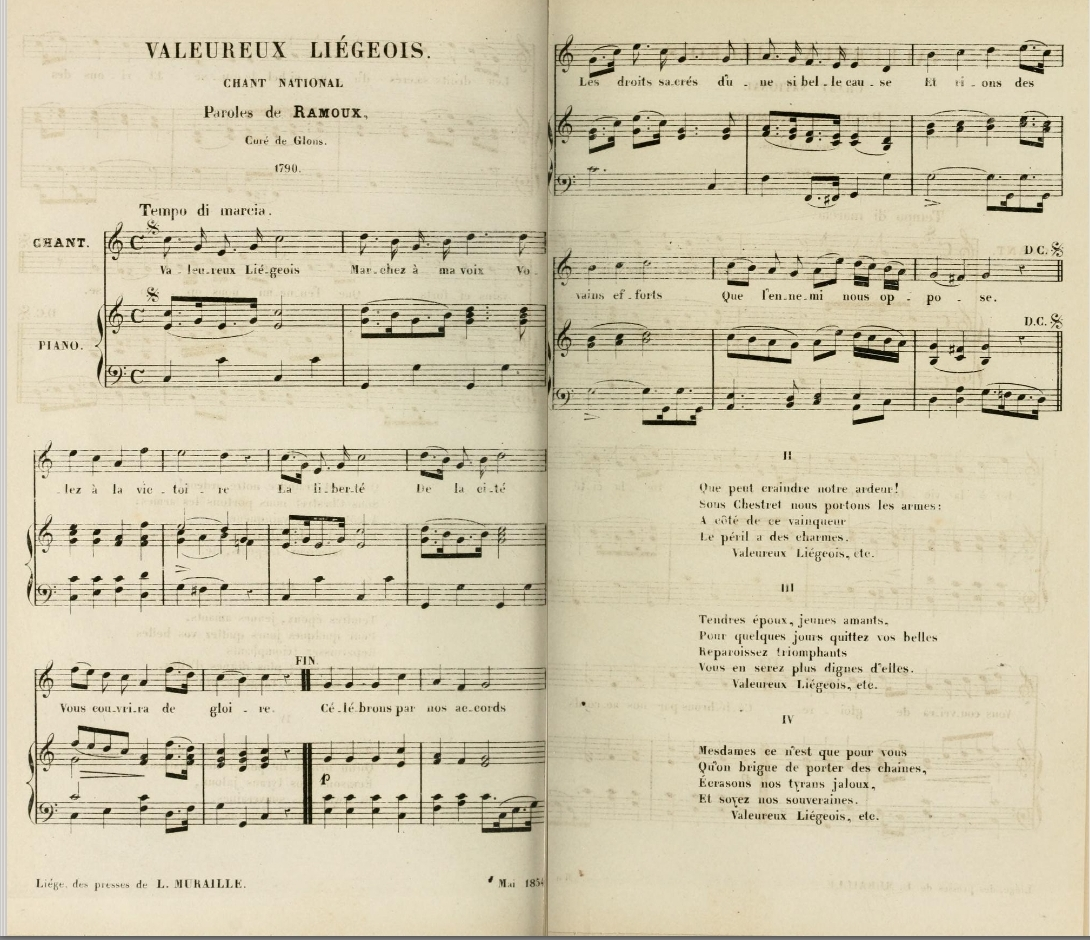
Musical script of the song, from 1852

Valeureux Liégeois (French pronunciation: [valœʁø ljeʒwa], literally "Valiant people of Liège") is a patriotic song written in 1790 by Abbot Gilles-Joseph-Evrard Ramoux in the town of Liège at a time when the Liège Revolution was threatened by Austrian forces seeking the restoration of the Prince-bishop César-Constantin-François de Hoensbroeck.

== Lyrics ==
Abbot Ramoux wrote Valeureux Liégeois in 1790 at the request of Lambert-Joseph de Donceel, a revolutionary and commander of the Liège militia who wanted a national song "to expel from the homes of our citizens the enemies of the fatherland who dared to enter".

The lyrics of the song had a patriotic air, though they were subsequently added to or modified several times. The original song only had two verses.

Chorus:
Valeureux Liégeois,
Fidèles à ma voix, (Note: In some versions, the phrase "Fidèles à ma voix" ("Loyal to my voice") in the chorus is replaced with "Marchez à ma voix", or "March to my command".)
Volez à la victoire!
Et la liberté de notre Cité
Vous couvrira de gloire.

Verses:
Célébrons par nos accords
Les droits sacrés d'une si belle cause,
Et rions des vains efforts
Que l'ennemi nous oppose.

Que peut craindre notre ardeur?
Sous Chestret nous portons les armes:
À côté de ce vainqueur
Le péril a des charmes.

César vainqueur de l’univers
Te décerna le titre de brave,
Des Romains tu brisas les fers,
Jamais tu ne vécus esclave.

Tendres époux, jeunes amants
Pour quelques jours, quittez vos belles;
Reparaissez triomphants,
Vous en serez plus dignes d'elles.

=== Translation ===
Chorus:
Brave people of Liège,
Loyal to my voice,
Fly to victory!
And the liberty of our state
Will cover you in glory.

Verses:
Let us celebrate with our agreement
The sacred rites of such a beautiful cause,
And laugh at the vain efforts
Of the enemy who opposes us.

Why fear our zeal?
Under [Jean-Remy de] Chestret we bear our arms:
At the side of the victor
danger has charm.

Caesar conqueror of the universe
You bestowed the title of the brave,
Your smashed the Roman's chains,
Never did you live as slave.

Tender husbands, young lovers
For several days, you must leave your sweethearts;
When you return triumphant,
You will be more deserving of them.

== Student fokelore ==
Students from the University of Liège (ULg) have a tradition of modifying the song to a version with the refrain:

Valeureux Liégeois,
Fidèle à ma voix,
Vole à la victoire.
Et la liberté
De notre cite
Te couvrira de gloire.

(Brave people of Liège,
True to my voice,
Steal to victory.
And freedom
Of our city
Will cover you with glory.)

Along with verses 3 and 1.
