= Académie royale des beaux-arts de Liège =

Coordinates: 50.6471°N 5.5682°E

The Académie royale des beaux-arts de Liège, officially since 29 March 2021 the Beaux-Arts de Liège - École supérieure des Arts (BAL ou BAL-ÉSA), is the academy of fine arts of the Belgian city of Liège. The art academy was first established in 1775 by prince-bishop François-Charles de Velbrück, and was led initially by Guillaume Évrard and later by Léonard Defrance. The prince-bishop's academy was closed in the French period, and under the United Kingdom of the Netherlands the Royal Academy of Fine Arts in Antwerp was given a monopoly on certifying art teachers. In the wake of the Belgian Revolution, the city of Liège refounded an academy of fine arts in 1837, under the patronage of the Belgian crown. By 1890 there were 650 students enrolled, with another 400 studying at the École Saint-Luc, making Liège a significant centre of art education. In 1898 the alumni association started publishing the art journal L'Effort.

In 1976, a course on drawing comics was instituted in the evening section.

The academy was originally established in a former beguinage, the Hospice Saint-Abraham, but in 1895 moved to a purpose-built Renaissance Revival structure on Rue des Anglais, designed by Joseph Lousberg.
