= François-Charles de Velbrück =

German ecclesiastic

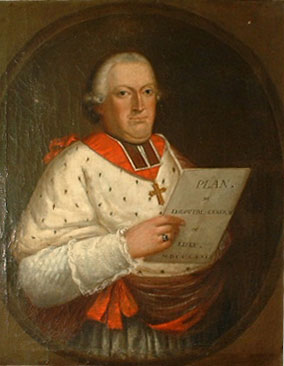

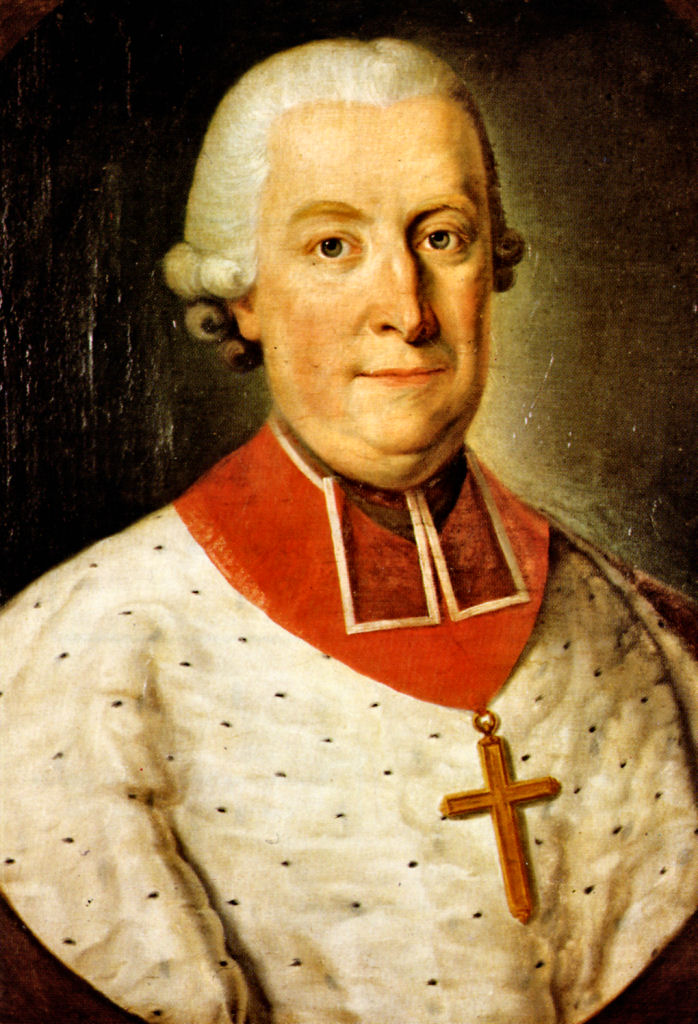

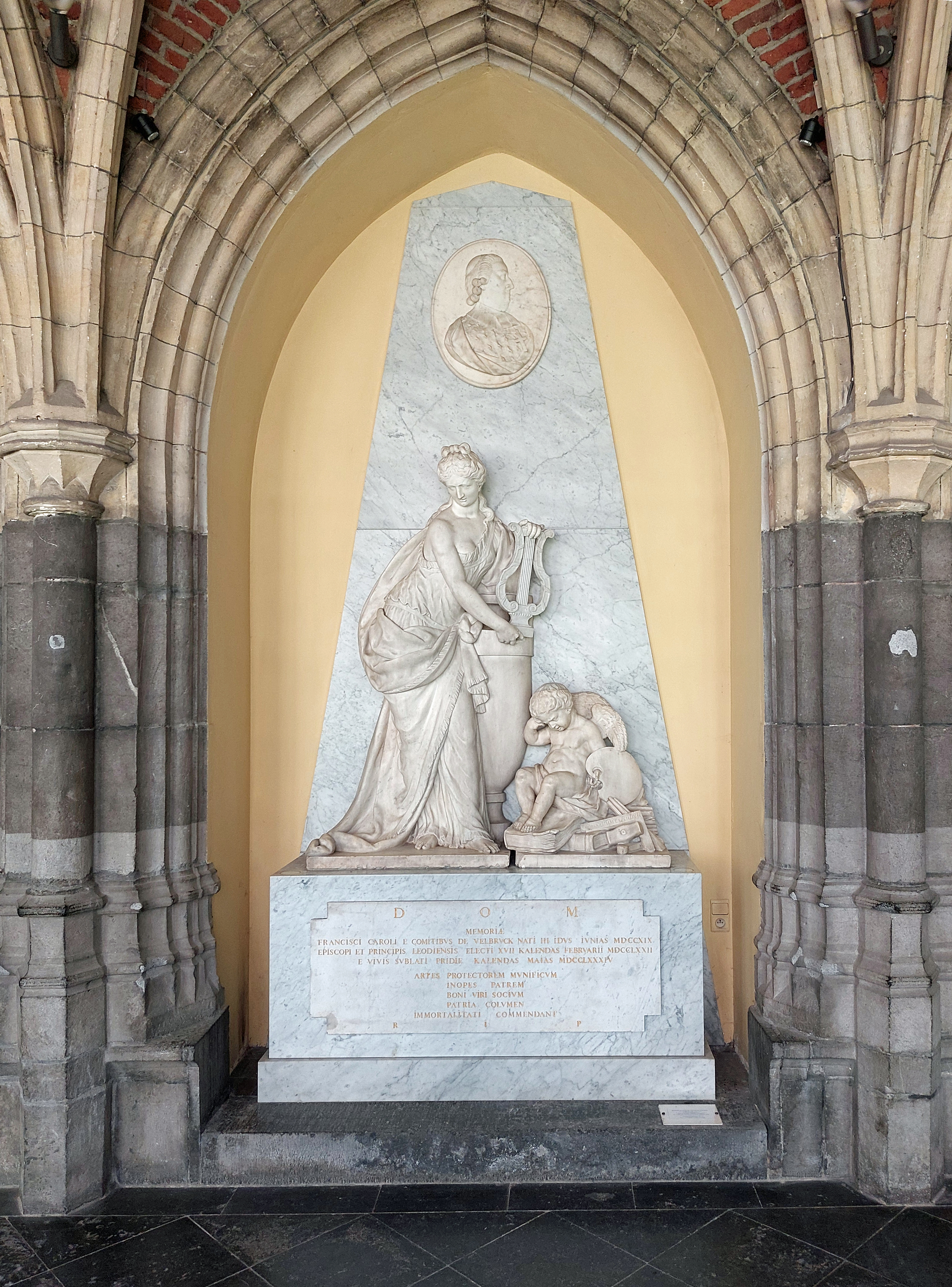
Mausoleum in the cloister of St. Paul's Cathedral, Liège

François Charles de Velbrück (1719–1784) was a German ecclesiastic. He was prince bishop of Liège from 16 February 1772 to his death on 30 April 1784.

== Early life ==
Velbrück was born at Garath Castle near Düsseldorf on 11 June 1719. In 1735, when he was 16, his brother made over to him a prebend of Saint Lambert's Cathedral, Liège. A year later, Velbrück was received onto the cathedral chapter by procuration. He did not reside in Liège until 1745. In 1756 he was appointed archdeacon of Hesbaye and later the same year Scel des Grâces (keeper of the prince-bishop's seal).

In 1757 he was put in charge of a diplomatic mission to the court at Vienna. In 1759 he became grand master of the household and prime minister to Johann Theodor of Bavaria, the prince-bishop of Liège and the head of a sumptuous court. Velbrück was also made a prebendary canon of Münster Cathedral in 1757. Velbrück, who had been a conduit of French influence in Liège, lost his position at court after Johann Theodor's death in 1763 and the election of his rival, Charles-Nicolas d'Oultremont, as prince-bishop. In 1765 Louis XV made him commendatory abbot of the royal abbey of Saint-Nicolas at Cheminon, Champagne. At Oultremont's death in 1772, Velbrück was unanimously elected to succeed him.

== Prince-bishop of Liège ==
His reign saw the birth of several social, artistic and intellectual initiatives. As an 'enlightened despot' receptive to the progressive ideas arising in the last decades of France's Ancien Régime, he tried to introduce Enlightenment ideas to the Principality of Liège, but a lack of money or power meant that these projects were not always successful. A certain lethargy and narrowness of vision then reigned in the principality, preventing any real progress. He made several attempts to combat poverty and class inequality but was unable to make a real difference to the deplorable situation. He tried to make changes in several areas, such as public health by setting up the Hôpital général Saint-Léonard as a place where the needy would be welcomed and assisted, a free midwifery course and establishments to combat disease.

Velbrück also reformed education, making it open to all by creating free charity schools for poor children and an Education Plan for the Youth of the Country of Liège. Put in charge of executing the decree for the suppression of the Jesuits in Liège in 1773, he handed over their Collège en Isle over to his clergy in 1786 to use as a seminary. He modernised teaching by giving more importance to physical sciences and mathematics and the human sciences, which provided the students with useful objectives for their critical judgment. He also planned to create a large public library. Velbrück was a great protector of the arts and his actions were essential to the renaissance in arts in the bishopric. In 1774 he launched the construction of a public academy of painting, sculpture and engraving.

Finally, his most notable work was the 1779 foundation of the Société littéraire de Liège and the Société d’Emulation, a meeting-place for Liège's intelligentsia and for them to come into contact with foreign scholars – these societies' many activities included presentations of scientific discoveries and artists' and poets' works.

It was later claimed that he was also a freemason, effectively a member of a Liège lodge, the Parfaite Intelligence et l'Etoile Réunies, but proof has never been produced. The Master of this lodge, Dwelshauwers-Dery, wrote in his history of freemasonry in Liège: Après avoir fouillé nombre d'archives inconnues jusqu'ici, je n'ai trouvé aucune preuve que le Prince de Velbrück ait été franc-maçon. This has not been convincingly contradicted since.

He died at Hex Castle, near Tongeren, on 30 April 1784, and was buried in Liège. His mausoleum escaped destruction during the Liège Revolution in which his remains, unlike those of his predecessors, were not thrown into a ditch. His restored mausoleum has since 15 June 2000 been in the cloister of St. Paul's Cathedral, Liège. The epitaph bears witness to the great regard he was held in by the people of the bishopric:

The people were instructed by his care, his kindness / He welcomed the arts, advanced their progress, / At the Emulation he opened a sanctuary, / Was its protector and tutelary god. / Good, affable and humane, Velbrück was at once / Both an Augustus and a Maecenas in the midst of the people of Liège

== Bibliography ==
- Joseph Daris, Histoire du diocèse et de la principauté de Liège, Liège, 1868, tome I : François-Charles de Velbruck, p. 261 et suiv.
- Reynier, Éloge de feu Son Altesse Célcissime Monseigneur François-Charles des comtes de Velbruck, 1785.
- J. de Theux, Le chapitre de Saint-Lambert, Bruxelles, 1872, vol. IV, p. 49.
- Georges de Froidcourt, Velbrück prince-évêque philosophe, Liège, Gothier et fils, 1948. In-8°, 83 p., tirage limité à 301 exemplaires don't 300 sur vélin anglais.
- Paul Harsin, "Velbruck, sa carrière politique et son élection à l'épiscopat liégeois", dans, La Vie wallonne, décembre 1924 et janvier 1925.
- Paul Harsin, "Velbruck, le prince, l'évêque", dans, La Terre wallonne, mai 1929, p. 70.
- Ophoven, Continuation du Recueil héraldique des Seigneurs bourgmestres de Liége, 1783, p. 207 et seq.
- Th. Gobert, Liège à travers les âges, volume V, p. 499 et seq.
- J. Kuntziger, Essai historique sur la propagande des Encyclopédistes Français en Belgique au XVIIIe siècle, Bruxelles, Hayez, 1879.
- Henri Francotte, La propagande des Encyclopédistes français au Pays de Liège, Bruxelles, Hayez, 1880).
- Jules Helbig, Éloge académique du Prince de Velbruck, 1881.
- Georges de Froidcourt, François-Charles, comte de Velbruck, prince-évêque de Liège, Franc-maçon, Liège, 1936.
- Ulysse Capitaine, Aperçu historique sur le Franc-Maçonnerie à Liège avant 1830, iège, 1853
- A. Cordier, Histoire de l'Ordre Maçonnique en Belgique, Mons, 1854
- Dwelshauwers-Dery, Histoire de la Franc-Maçonnerie à Liège avant 1820, Bruxelles, 1879.
- Paul Duchaine, La Franc-Maçonnerie Belge au XVIIIe siècle, Bruxelles, 1911
- Bertrand Van der Schelden, La franc-maçonnerie belge sous le régime autrichien, Louvain, 1923
- Un siècle de franc-maçonnerie dans nos régions, 1740–1840, Bruxelles, 1983

Catholic Church titles
Preceded by Charles-Nicolas d’Oultremont	Prince bishop of Liege; 1772–1784	Succeeded by César-Constantin-François de Hoensbroeck
