= Jean-Remy de Chestret =

French revolutionary (1739–1809)

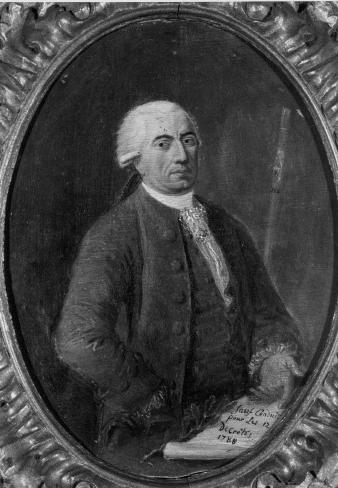
Portrait of Jean-Remy de Chestret by Léonard Defrance

Jean-Remy de Chestret (1739 in Liège – 1809 in Paris) was a Burgomaster of Liège in 1784 and 1789 and one of the chiefs of the Liège Revolution and later a member of the French Sénat conservateur.

He is referred to in the revolutionary song Valeureux Liégeois.
