= François Antoine Marie Constantin de Méan et de Beaurieux =

Belgian archbishop

His Excellency François Antoine Marie Constantin de Méan et de Beaurieux
- Archbishop of Mechelen; Primate of Belgium
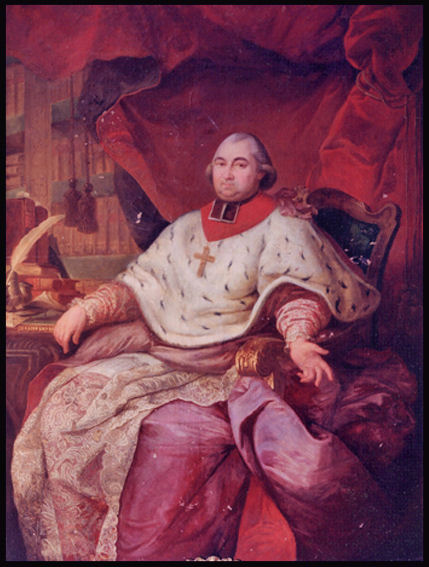
- Church: Roman Catholic
- Archdiocese: Mechelen
- Appointed: 28 July 1817
- In office: 1817–1831
- Predecessor: Dominique-Georges-Frédéric Dufour de Pradt
- Successor: Engelbert Sterckx
- Previous posts: Auxiliary Bishop of Liège (1785–1792); Bishop of Liège (1792–1801)

Orders
- Ordination: 17 September 1785
- Consecration: 19 February 1786 by César-Constantin-François de Hoensbroeck

Personal details
- Born: 6 July 1756 Saive, Blegny, Belgium
- Died: 15 January 1831 (aged 74)
- Motto: Domine non recuso Laborem.

François Antoine Marie Constantin de Méan et de Beaurieux (French pronunciation: [fʁɑ̃swa ɑ̃twan maʁi kɔ̃stɑ̃tɛ̃ də meɑ̃ e də boʁjø]; Saive, 6 July 1756 – 15 January 1831), was Archbishop of Mechelen, Belgium.

He was born as son of François Antoine, Count of Méan de Beaurieux and Elisabeth of Hoensbroeck-Oost, his older brother Peter Karel became Count of Mean after his father's death.

== Career ==
On 17 September 1785, at the age of 29, he was ordained as a priest in Liège, Belgium. He was appointed Bishop of Liège on 16 August 1792, succeeding his uncle César-Constantin-François de Hoensbroeck as the last Sovereign Prince-Bishop of that principality. He was ejected in July 1794 by French troops and the Principality of Liège was annexed to France the following year, he resigned only in 1802.

In 1802 he became the apostolic vicar of Ravenstein-Megen.

He was recognized a Prince (personal title) in 1816 and appointed Archbishop of Mechelen on 28 July 1817. He became the first Archbishop of Belgium in 1830.

== See also ==
- Archbishopric of Mechelen-Brussels
- Prince-Bishopric of Liège

== Sources ==
- François Antoine Marie Constantin de Méan et de Beaurieux

Catholic Church titles
Preceded by Dominique-Georges-Frédéric Dufour de Pradt	14th Archbishop of Mechelen; 1817-1831	Succeeded by Engelbert Sterckx
Preceded by César-Constantin-François de Hoensbroeck	Prince-Bishop of Liège; 1792–1794 de facto (de jure 1792-1801)	Succeeded by Annexed to France in 1794; Re-established 1802: Jean-Évangéliste Zäpfel (as Bishop of Liège)
