= Prince-Bishopric of Liège =

State of the Holy Roman Empire (980–1795)

Coordinates: 50°40′N 5°30′E

Prince-Bishopric of Liège: Principatus episcopalis Leodiensis (Latin); Principauté de Liège (French); Principåté d' Lidje (Walloon); Fürstbistum Lüttich (German); Prinsbisdom Luik (Dutch); Prinsbisdom Luuk (Limburgish)
- 980–1789; 1791–1792; 1793–1795
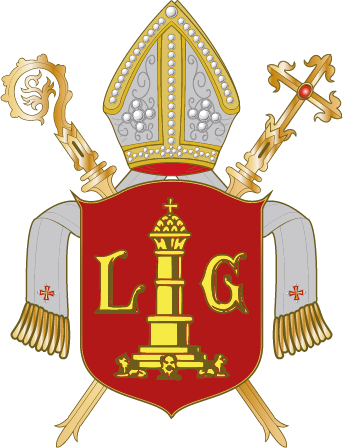
- Flag Coat of arms

- The Prince-Bishopric of Liège around 1350.
- Status: Ecclesiastic state of the Holy Roman Empire
- Capital: Liège
- Common languages: Latin and Old French, becoming Francien (French), Walloon and German
- Religion: Roman Catholic
- Government: Elective principality
- Prince-Bishop
  - 340s–384: Saint Servatius (first bishop, at Tongeren)
  - approximately 670–700: Saint Lambert (at Maastricht)
  - 972–1008: Notker (first prince-bishop)
  - 1792–1794: François-Antoine-Marie de Méan (last)
- Historical era: Middle Ages
  - Creation of diocese: 340s
  - Secular powers obtained: 980
  - Purchased Lordship of Bouillon: 1096
  - Annexed County of Loon: 1366
  - Acquired County of Horne: 1568
  - Liège Revolution: 1789–1791
  - Annexed by France: 1795
  - Concordat accepts dissolution of Bishopric: 10 September 1801
Succeeded by
Republic of Liège; French First Republic
- Today part of: Belgium; France; Germany; Netherlands

The Prince-Bishopric of Liège or Principality of Liège was a Roman Catholic ecclesiastical principality of the Holy Roman Empire that was situated for the most part in present-day Belgium. It was an Imperial Estate, so the bishop of Liège, as its prince, had a seat and a vote in the Imperial Diet. The Prince-Bishopric of Liège should not be confused with the Diocese of Liège, which was larger and over which the prince-bishop exercised only the usual responsibilities of a bishop.

The bishops of Liège acquired their status as prince-bishops between 980 and 985 when Bishop Notker of Liège, who had been the bishop since 972, received secular control of the County of Huy from Emperor Otto II.

From 1500, the prince-bishopric belonged to the Lower Rhenish–Westphalian Circle. Its territory included most of the present Belgian provinces of Liège and Limburg, and some exclaves in other parts of Belgium and the Netherlands.

The ecclesiastical state briefly became a republic (the Republic of Liège) from 1789 to 1791, before reverting to a prince-bishopric in 1791. The role of the bishop as prince permanently ended when the state was annexed by France in 1795. In 1815 the territories it had held became part of the United Kingdom of the Netherlands, and in 1830 they were within the part of that kingdom which split off to become Belgium.

The principality ruled by the bishops of Liège was never part of the Seventeen Provinces or the Spanish and Austrian Southern Netherlands, but from the 16th century onwards its politics were strongly influenced by the dukes of Burgundy and later the Habsburgs.

In 1559 its 1,636 parishes were grouped into eight archdeaconries, and twenty-eight councils, chrétientés (deaneries). The most important cities (bonnes villes) of the bishopric were: Liège, Beringen, Bilzen, Borgloon, Bree, Châtelet, Ciney, Couvin, Dinant, Fosses-la-Ville, Hamont, Hasselt, Herk-de-Stad, Huy, Maaseik, Peer, Sint-Truiden, Stokkem, Thuin, Tongeren, Verviers, Visé and Waremme.

The city of Maastricht fell under the joint jurisdiction of the prince-bishop of Liège and the duke of Brabant (later the States-General of the United Provinces). The second city of the prince-bishopric thus kept its special status throughout the ancien régime.

== Medieval prince-bishopric ==
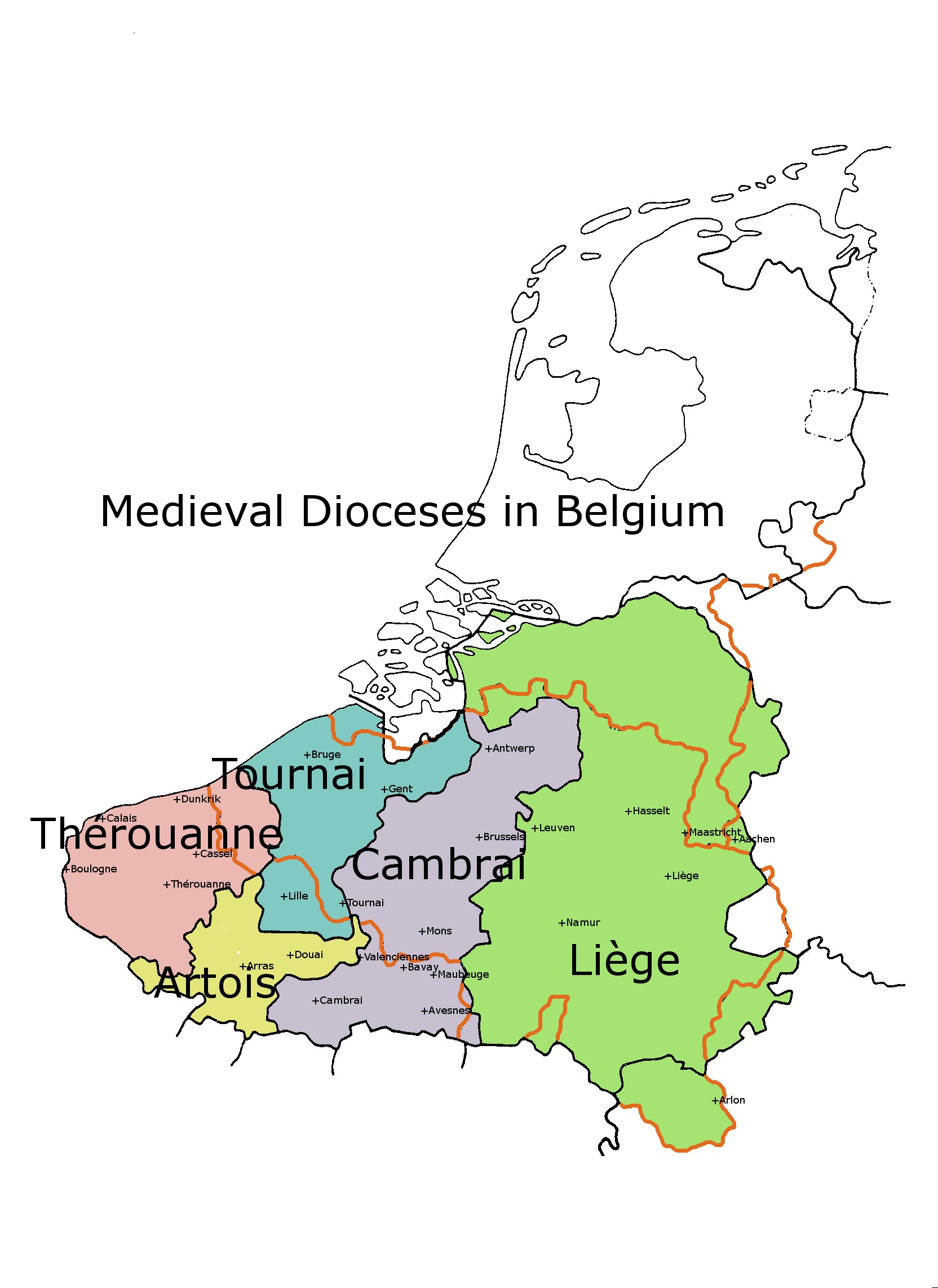
This map shows the pre-1559 medieval Diocese of Liège (in green) which evolved from the Civitas Tungrorum and probably had similar boundaries.

The large diocese of the medieval bishops was, until 1559, much larger than the princedom which was in their possession. However, the princely domain was gradually enlarged by donations and by acquisitions. In the 10th century, the bishops received secular lordship over the county of Huy, which lay within the diocese. Bishop Notker (972–1008) and his successors are thus referred to as princes within the Holy Roman Empire. This situation continued until the French Revolution, and throughout that period of nearly eight centuries the Prince-Bishopric of Liège succeeded in maintaining a level of autonomy, though it remained under the emperor. This virtual independence was owed largely to the ability of its bishops, who on several occasions played an important part in international politics, being strategically positioned between France and Germany.

Throughout the Middle Ages, the prince-bishopric was further expanded with the lordship of Bouillon in 1096 (ceded to France in 1678), the acquisition of the county of Loon (French: Looz) in 1366 and the county of Horne in 1568.

Notker, the founder of the principality, also rebuilt the cathedral of St Lambert, as well as the episcopal palace. He was also involved in other building activities in the city, which flourished under his rule (churches of St Paul, St. John the Evangelist, Sainte-Croix and St Denis). This bishop also strengthened the parochial organization of the city. He was one of the first church leaders to spread the observance of All Souls' Day, which he authorized for his diocese. Under Notker's administration, following up on the work of Heraclius, educational institutions in Liège flourished. With these two bishops (and Wazo) "The schools of Liège were, in fact, at that time one of the brightest literary foci of the period". In the 11th century the city was indeed known as the Athens of the North. "Liège for more than a century occupied among the nations a position in regard to science which it has never recovered". Subsequent bishops, Balderic of Looz (1008–1018), Wolbodo (1018–1021), Durandus (1021–1025), Reginard (1025–1038), Nitard (1038–1042), the learned Wazo, and Theoduin (1048–1075), valiantly sustained the heritage of Notker. The schools formed many brilliant scholars, and gave the Catholic Church popes Stephen IX and Nicholas II. The diocese also supplied the University of Paris with a number of important doctors — William of Saint-Thierry, Gerard of Liège and Godfrey of Fontaines. Alger of Liège (1055–1131) was an important intellectual of the period. He was first appointed deacon of church of St Bartholomew and finally retired at the monastery of Cluny.

In the reign of Henry of Verdun (1075–1091) a tribunal was instituted (tribunal de la paix) to prevent war and enforce the Peace of God. Otbert (1091–1119) increased the territory of the principality by purchasing the Lordship of Bouillon. He remained faithful to emperor Henry IV, who died as his guest. Henry of Namur (1119–1121) was venerated as a martyr. During the administration of Alexander of Juliers (1128–1134) the pope, the emperor and St Bernard of Clairvaux visited Liège. The episcopate of Raoul of Zachringen was marked by the preaching of the reformer Lambert le Bègue, who is credited with founding the Béguines.

Albert of Louvain was elected Bishop of Liège in 1191, but Emperor Henry VI, on the pretext that the election was doubtful, gave the see to Lothair of Hochstadt. Albero's election was confirmed by the pope but in 1192, shortly after he took office, he was assassinated by three German knights at Reims. It is probable that the emperor was privy to this murder but Albero was canonized. In 1195, Albert de Cuyck (1195–1200) formally recognized the political franchise of the people of Liège. During the 12th century, the cathedral chapter, along with the bishop, assumed a more important role in the history of the principality.

The struggles between the upper and lower classes, in which the prince-bishops frequently intervened, developed through the 13th and 14th centuries, and culminate in the 15th century in the pillage and destruction of the episcopal city. In the reign of Robert of Thourotte (1240–1246), Saint Juliana — a nun of Cornillon Abbey — was led by certain visions to the project of having a feast established in honour of the Blessed Sacrament. After much hesitation, the bishop approved of her idea but death prevented the institution of the feast. The completion of the work was left to a former prior of the Dominicans in Liège, Hugh of Saint-Cher, who returned to the city as papal legate. In 1252 Hugh made the feast of the Blessed Sacrament an obligation throughout his diocese. John of Troyes, who, after having been archdeacon at Liège, was elected pope as Urban IV, encouraged the observance of the feast of Corpus Christi in the whole Church. Another archdeacon of Liège became pope under the name Gregory X and deposed the unworthy Henry of Gueldres (1247–1274). The Peace of Fexhe, signed in 1316 during the reign of Adolph II de la Marck (1313–1344), regulated the relations between the prince-bishop and his subjects. Nevertheless, internal discord continued and the episcopate of Arnold of Horne (1378–1389) was marked by the triumph of the popular party. In 1366, the county of Loon was annexed to the bishopric.

== Burgundian and Habsburg influence ==
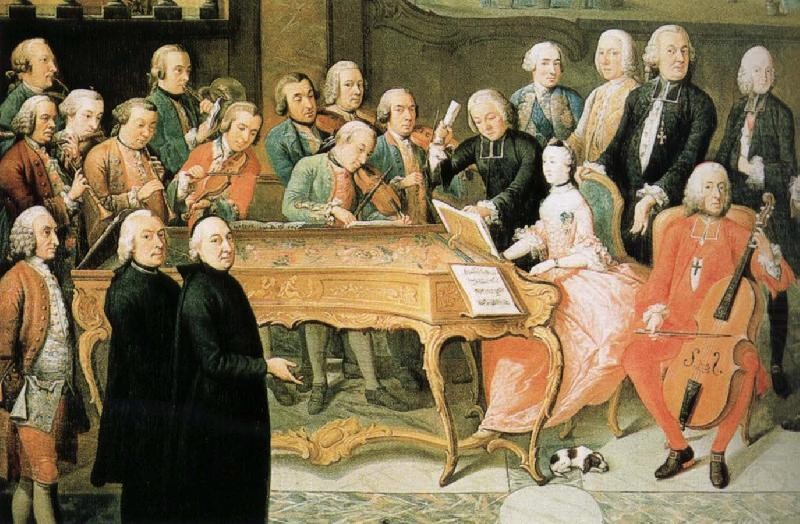
Prince-Bishop Johann Theodor of Bavaria at a court concert at Liège

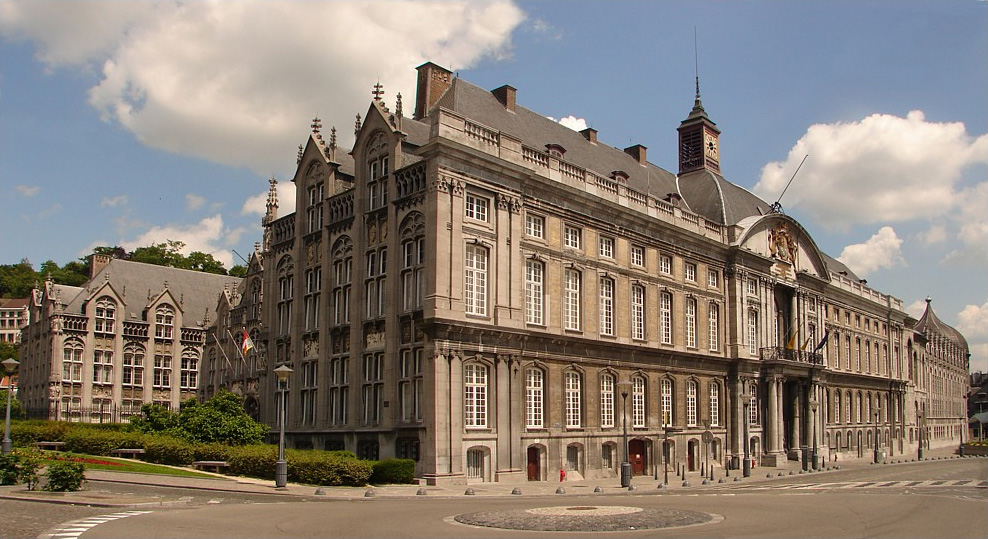
The episcopal Palace at Liège

Upon the death of Louis of Male, count of Flanders, in 1384, the Low Countries began their unification within the Burgundian Netherlands. Though the principality was still nominally independent, the Dukes of Burgundy have had an increasing influence on its government. Louis of Bourbon (1456–1482) was placed on the throne of Liège by the political machinations of Philip the Good, Duke of Burgundy. The population resisted Burgundian rule leading to the Liège Wars, the destruction of Dinant in 1466, and of Liège in 1468 by Charles the Bold, marking the ending of democratic ascendancy in the principality.

Charles V completed the union of the Seventeen Provinces in the 1540s, and unofficially also controlled the principality. He nominated Érard de La Marck (1505–1538) who brought a period of restoration. Erard was an enlightened protector of the arts. It was he who commenced the struggle against the Protestant reformers, which his successors carried forth, especially Gerard of Groesbeeck (1564–1580). With the object of assisting in this struggle, Paul IV, by Bull (Super Universi, 12 May 1559), created new bishoprics in the Low Countries. The new bishoprics were created largely at the expense of the diocese of Liège; many of its parishes were given to the new dioceses of Roermond, 's-Hertogenbosch, Namur, Mechelen and Antwerp. The number of deaneries in the diocese of Liège was reduced to 13.

Liège formed the last link in the chain of Habsburg allies that made up the so-called Spanish Road, a military corridor between Spanish-controlled Lombardy and the Spanish Netherlands. Completely encircled by Spanish territory, Liège was protected by treaties of neutrality which permitted the passage of Spanish troops through the prince-bishop's territory provided that they spent no more than two nights in one place. The importance of the prince-bishopric to Habsburg military logistics in the Eighty Years War prompted Spanish intervention foiling a Dutch invasion in 1595.

Most of the bishops in the 17th century were foreigners, many of them holding several bishoprics at once. Their frequent absences gave free scope for those feuds of the Chiroux and the Grignoux to which Maximilian Henry of Bavaria (archbishop of Cologne, 1650–1688) put a stop by the Edict of 1681. In the middle of the 18th century the ideas of the French Encyclopedists began to be received at Liège; Bishop de Velbrück (1772–1784), encouraged their propagation and thus prepared the way for the 1789 Liège Revolution. Partially connected with the French Revolution, a protest against the absolutist rule of prince bishop César-Constantin-François de Hoensbroeck developed into the Liège Revolution. At the beginning of 1791, the revolution was crushed by troops on the orders of the Holy Roman Empire.

The prince-bishopric was dissolved in 1795, when it was annexed by France. Its territory was divided amongst the départements of Meuse-Inférieure, Ourthe, and Sambre-et-Meuse.

== Notable people ==
- Jean de Chokier de Surlet (1571–1656), canon lawyer and political writer

== Gallery ==
Prince-Bishopric of Liège
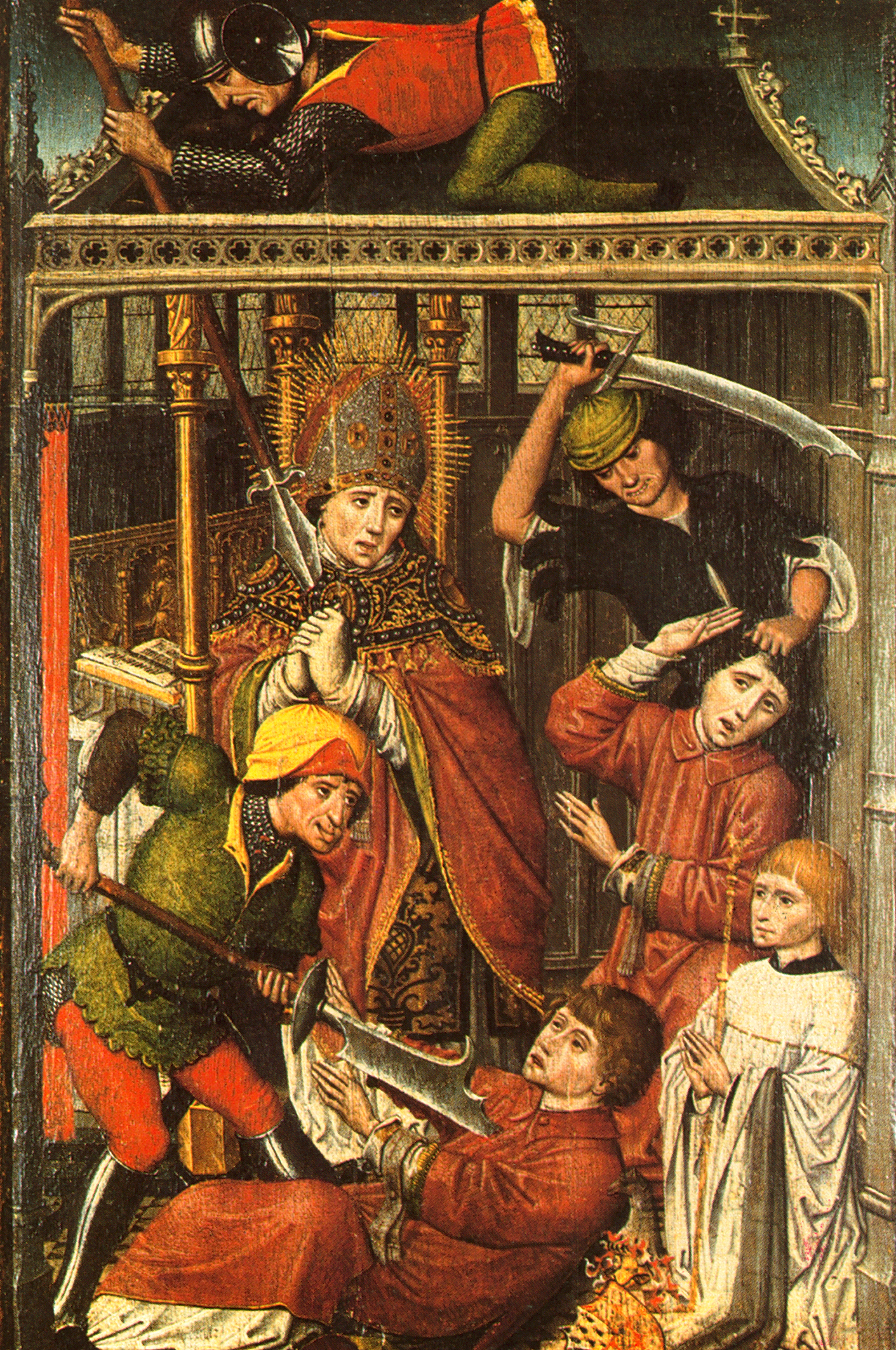
The martyrdom of Saint Lambert

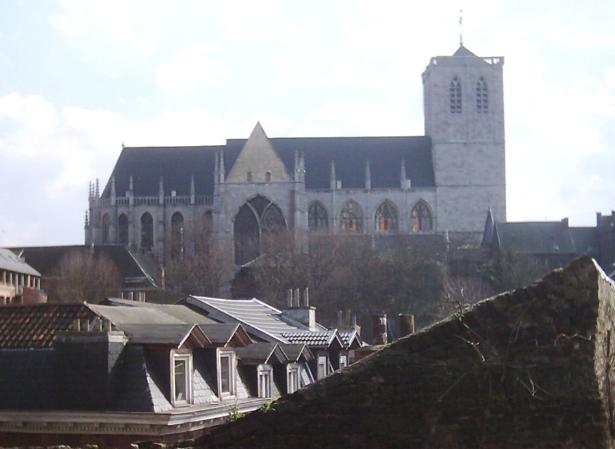
The building of Saint Martin began 965 under the reign of Heraclius

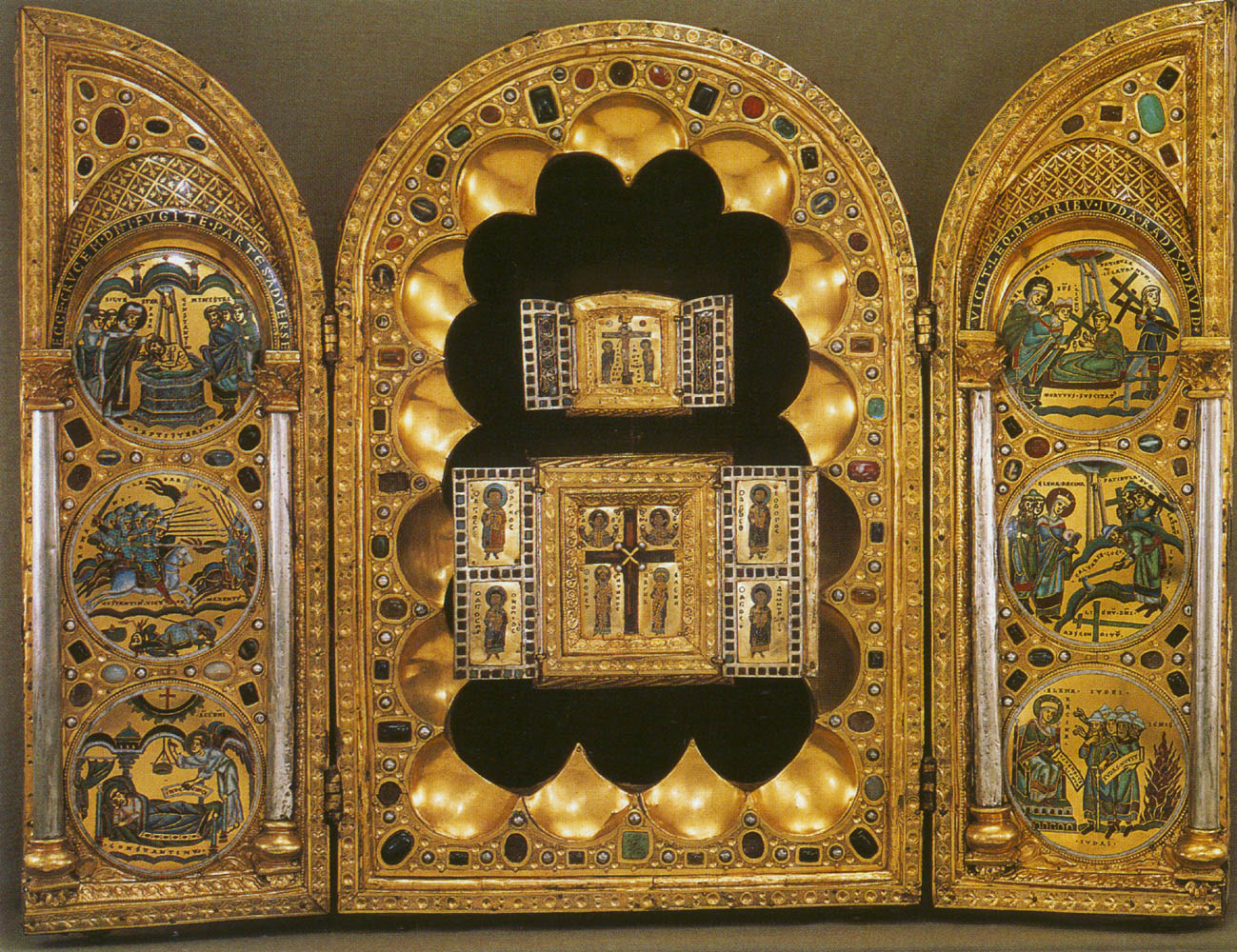
The Stavelot Triptych is an example of Mosan art, The Morgan Library & Museum, New York City

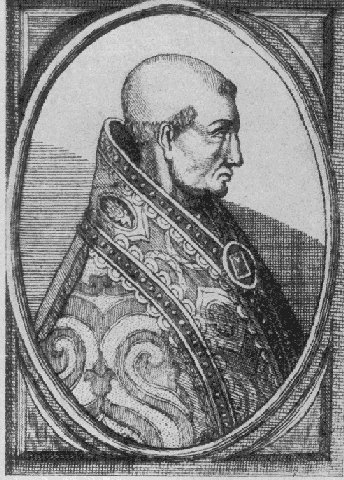
Pope Urban IV, archdeacon of Liège

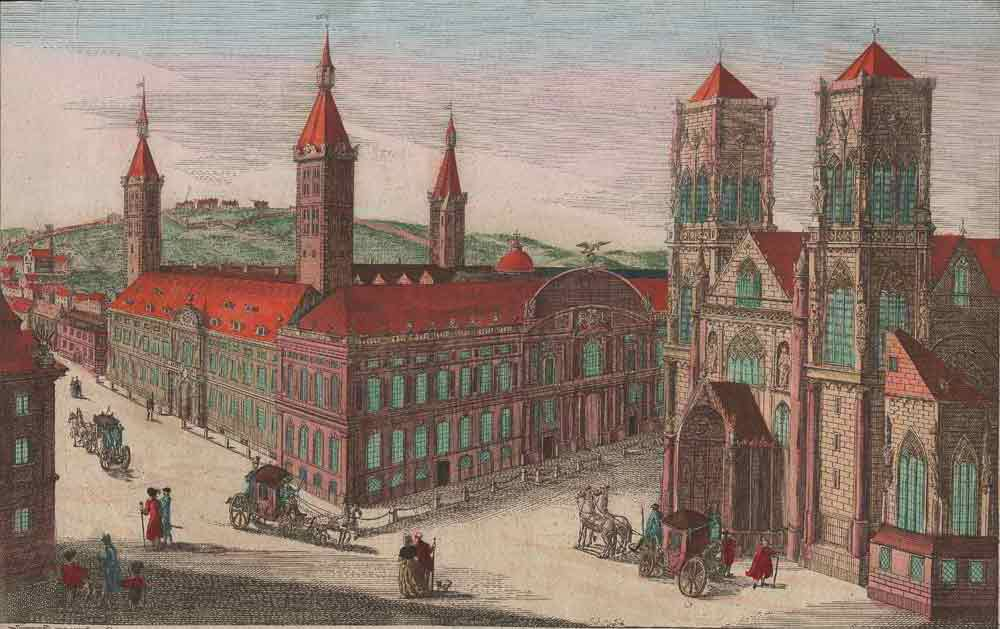
St. Lambert's Cathedral and the palace of the Prince-Bishops (18th century)

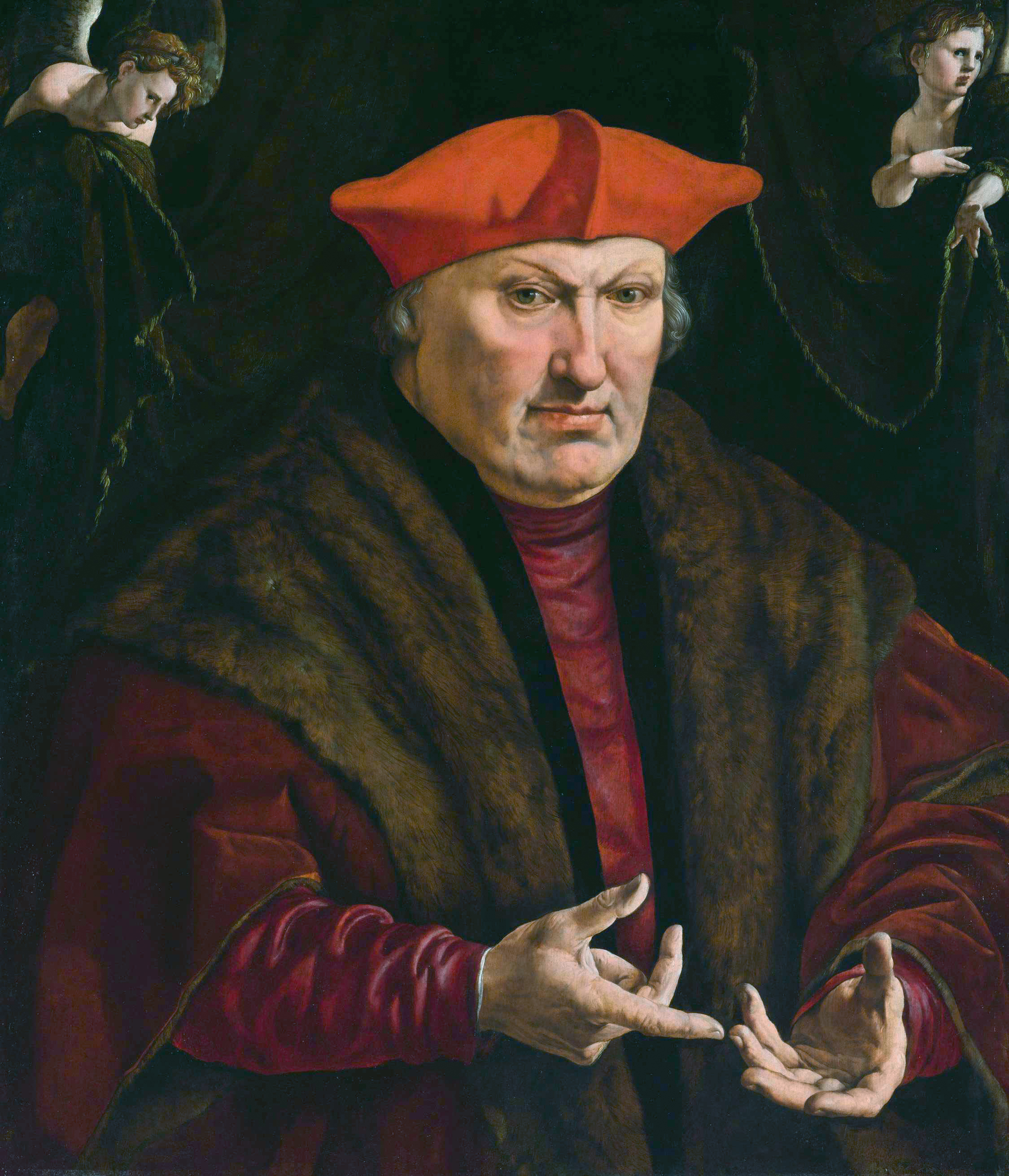
Portrait of Érard de La Marck (c. 1528)

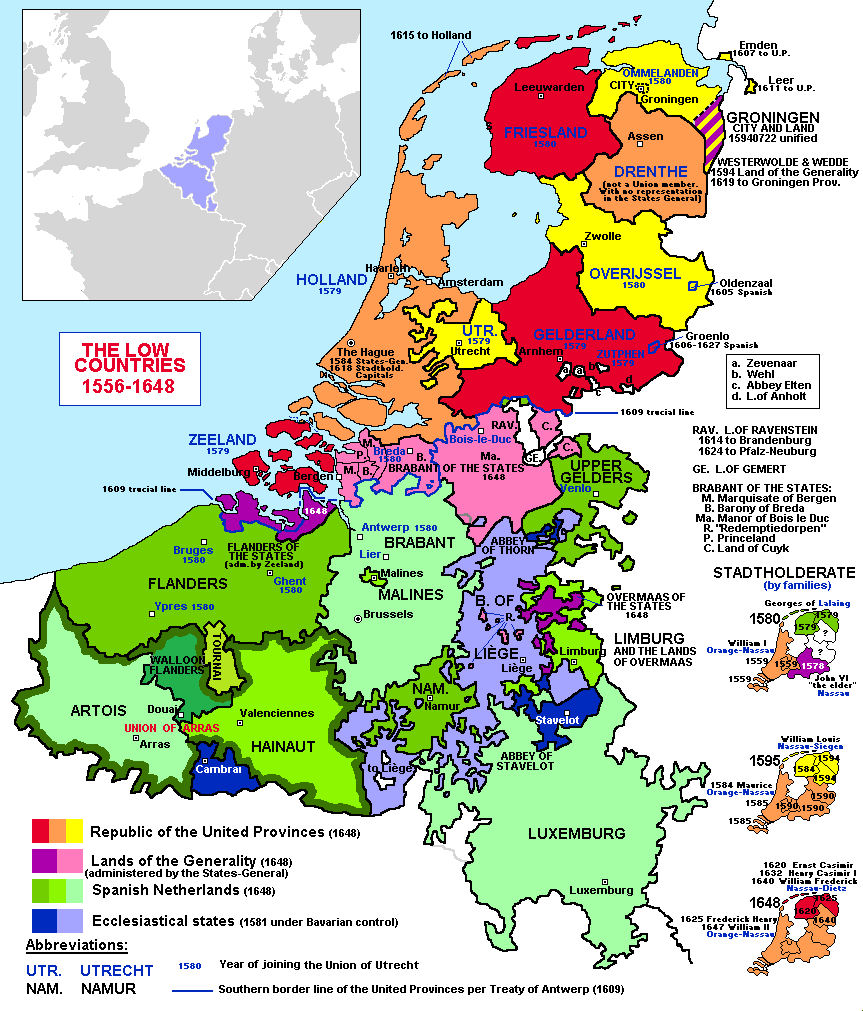
The Prince-Bishopric enclaved in the Low Countries, 1556–1648

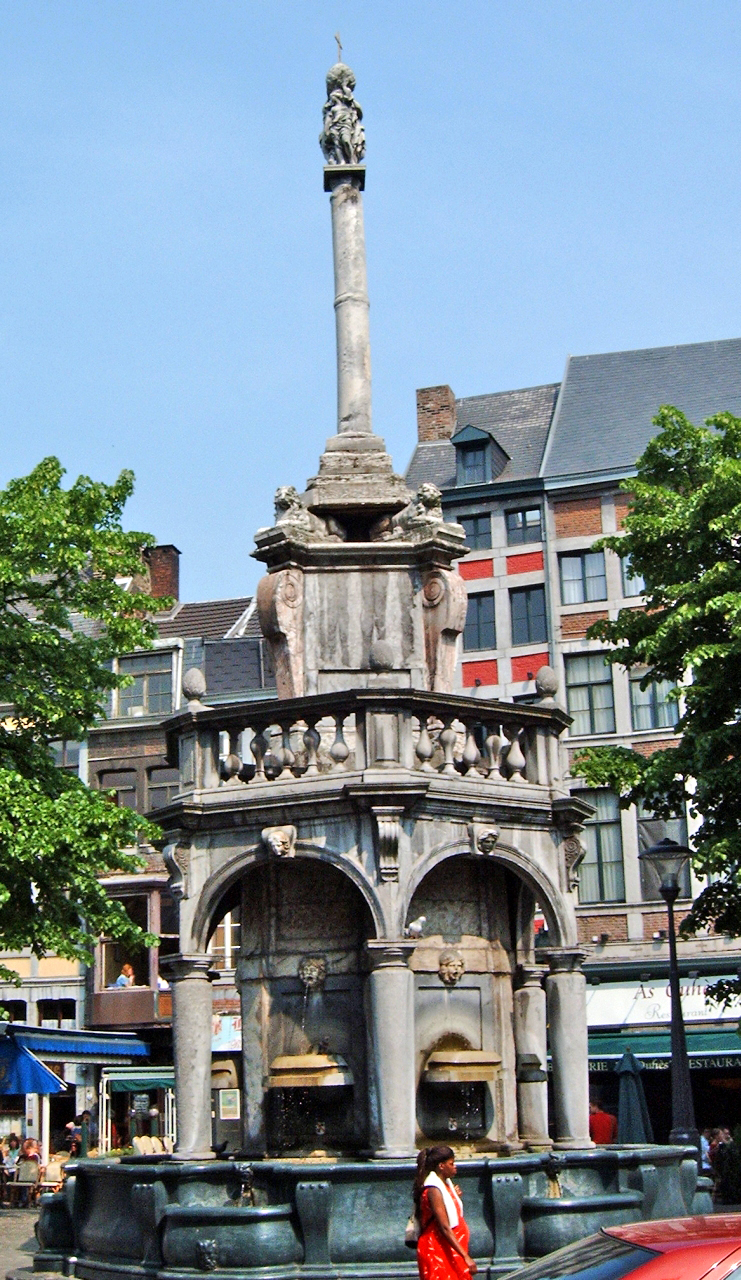
The Perron of Liège stands as a symbol for the city rights acquired by the burghers from the prince-bishop

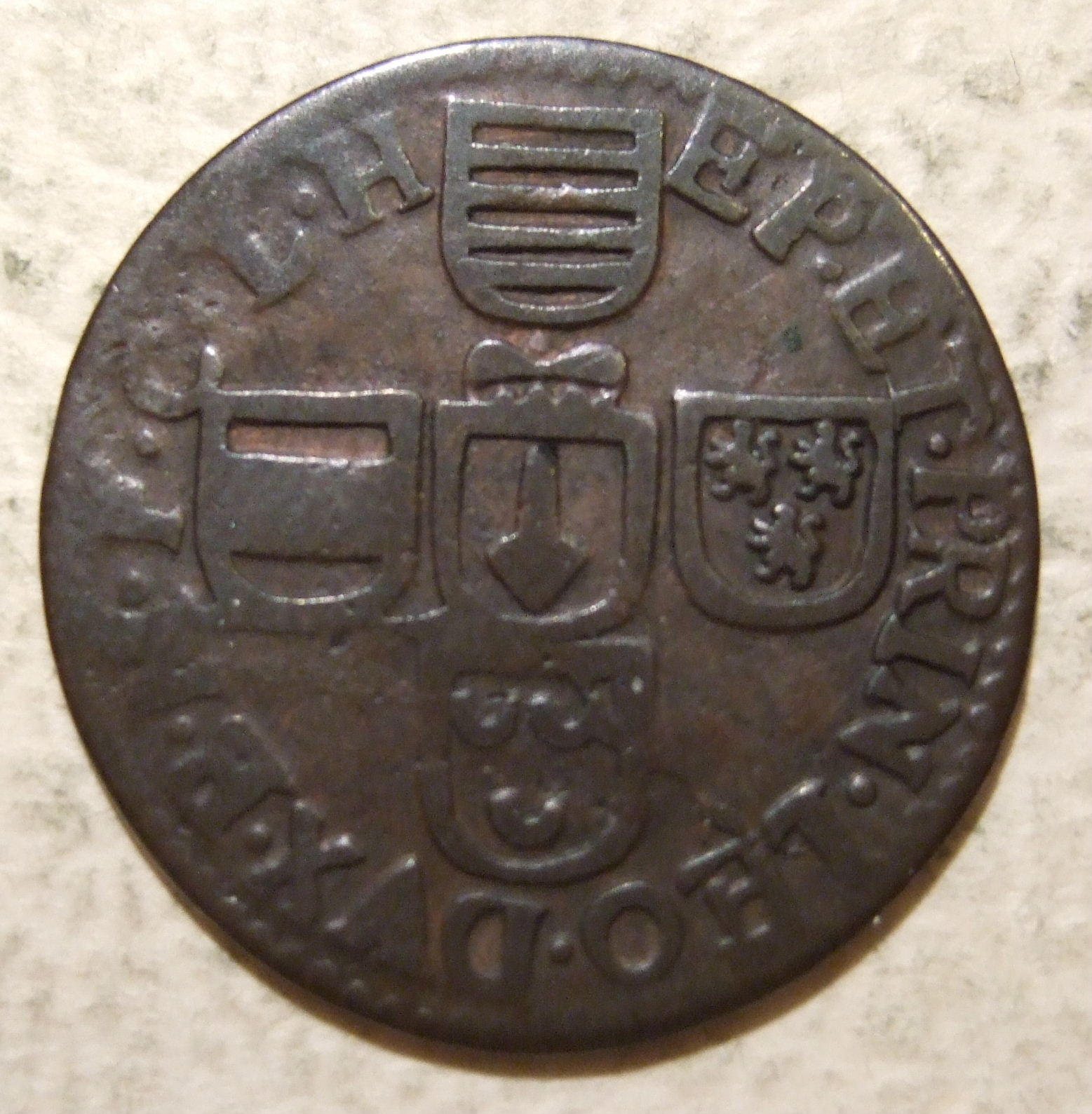
Coin perhaps from the reign of Johann Theodor of Bavaria, 1744–1763

== See also ==
- List of bishops and prince-bishops of Liège
- Baroque in Prince-Bishopric of Liège
