= César-Constantin-François de Hoensbroeck =

German ecclesiastic

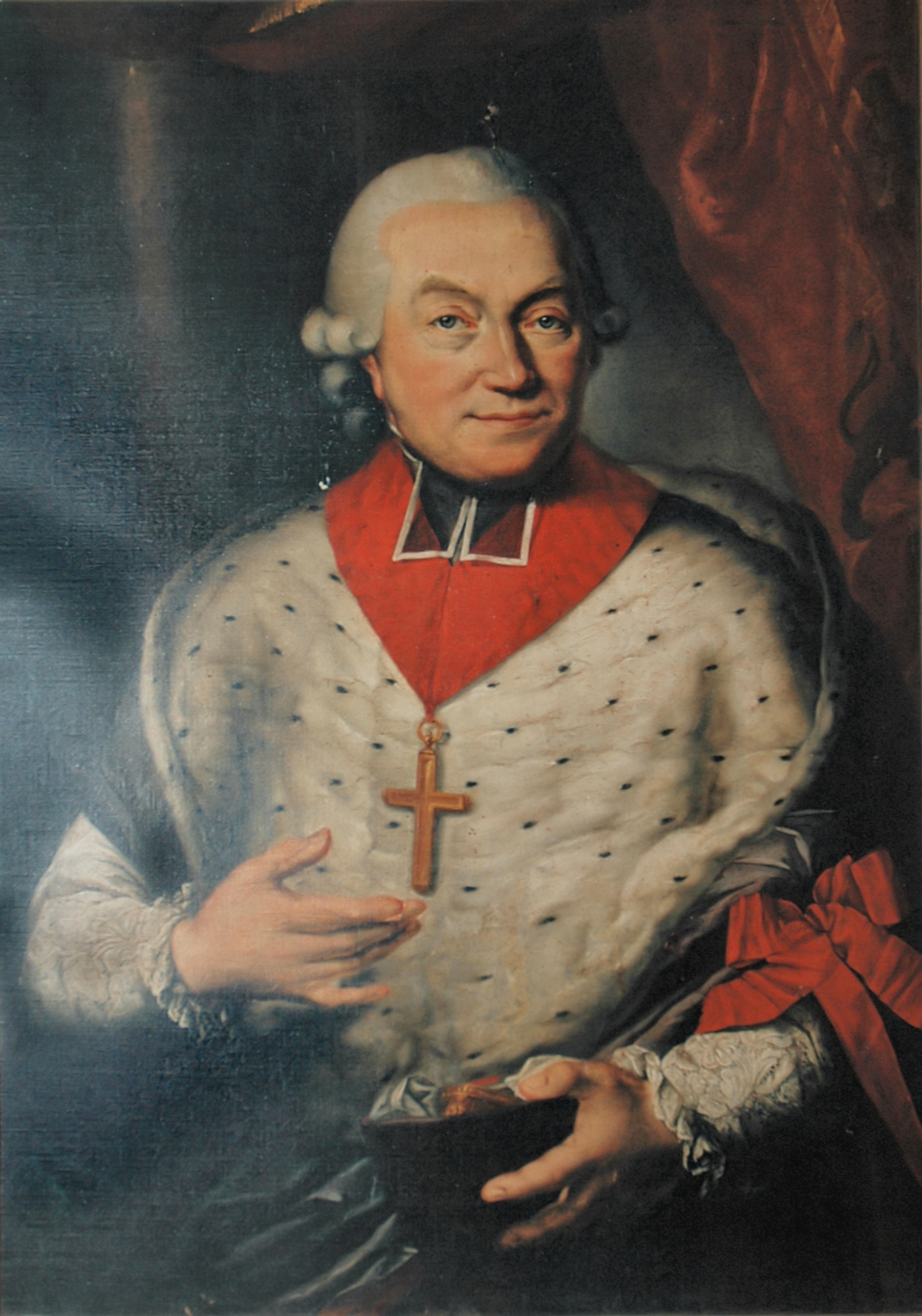
César-Constantin-François de Hoensbroeck, last prince bishop of Liege.

César-Constantin-François de Hoensbroeck or Hoensbroech (28 August 1724 – 3 June 1792) was a German ecclesiastic of the Van Hoensbroeck family, most notable as prince-bishop of Liège from 1784 to 1792, in which post he was nicknamed the "red executioner" (bourreau roux).

== Life ==
The son of Ulric Antoine de Hoensbroeck (whose family originated in the village of Hoensbroeck, now in Dutch Limburg), he studied at Heidelberg and became a canon in the cathedral chapter of Aachen Cathedral before becoming prince-bishop of Liège in 1784, succeeding François-Charles de Velbrück, whose progressive reforms he tried to undo. Hoensbroeck reestablished all the privileges of the clergy and nobility, sharing none of the third estate's liberal aspirations and showing little sympathy with the misery of the prince-bishopric's people. This all made him most unpopular, with the inhabitants of the bishopric nicknaming him the "tyrant of Seraing", after the prince bishops' summer palace.

His popularity continued to plummet until a mob came to try to take him from Seraing to the Prince-Bishops' Palace in Liège itself, an act that started the Liège Revolution. On 13 September 1790 he fled into Germany before being restored to his episcopal throne by Austrian troops on 13 February 1791. On his death he was succeeded by his nephew François de Méan, who was also unsympathetic to the French Revolution.

Catholic Church titles
Preceded by François-Charles de Velbruck	Prince bishop of Liège; 1784–1792	Succeeded by François-Antoine-Marie de Méan
