= The Oude Voetboog Guild in the Grote Markt =

Painting by David Teniers the Younger

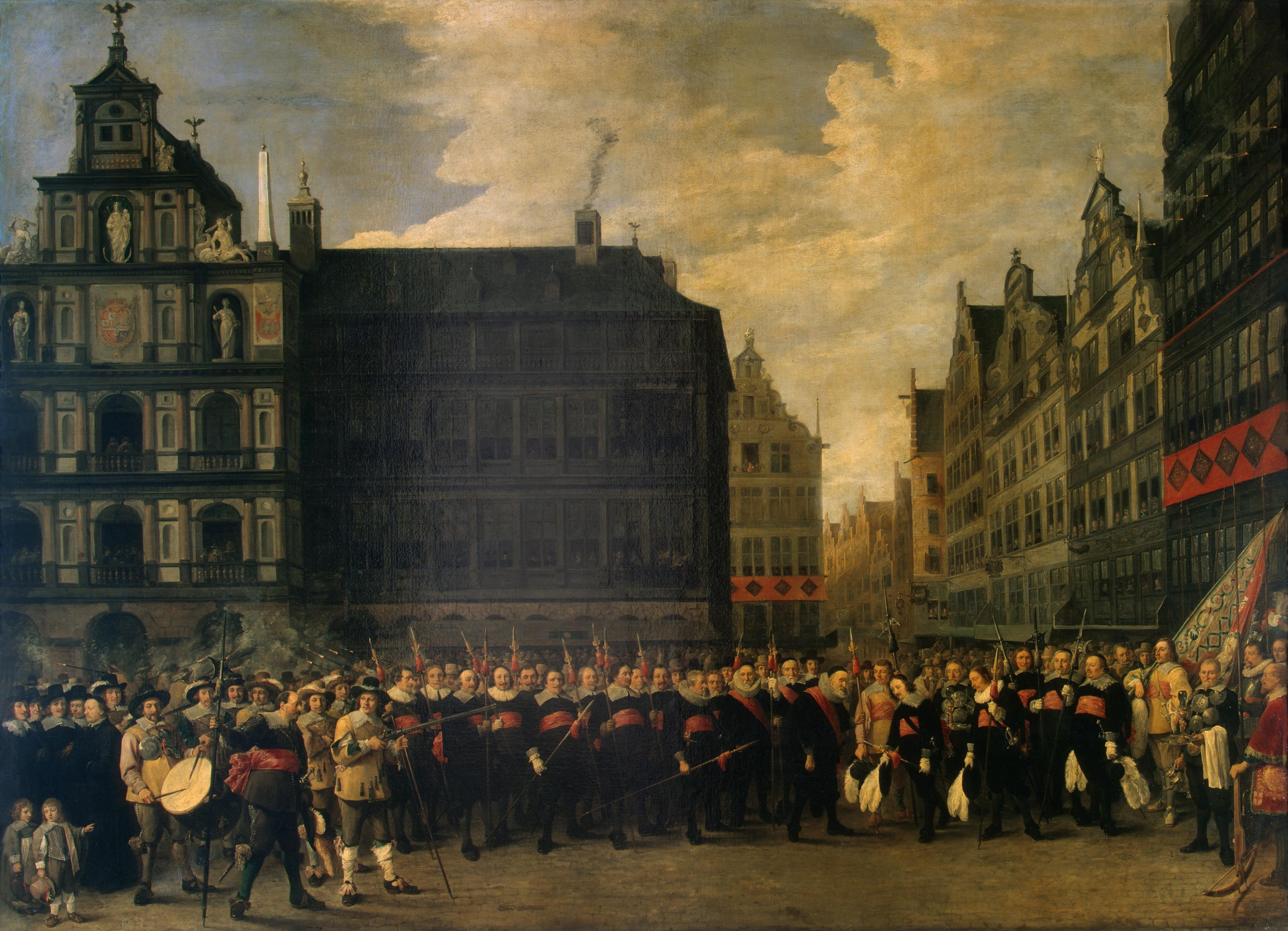
The Oude Voetboog Guild in the Grote Markt (1643) by David Teniers the Younger

The Oude Voetboog Guild in the Grote Markt is a 1643 oil-on-canvas painting by David Teniers the Younger, in the collection of the Hermitage Museum, in Saint Petersburg. It is signed and dated bottom left "DAVID. TENIERS. FEC. A 1643".

== Provenance ==
It was painted for the guild house's main hall. Teniers himself was a member of the guild and Klinge suggests that he painted it as a gift for the guild in return for exemption from guard duty, which was otherwise mandatory for all guild members. The painting was owned by the guild until 1649, when it hit financial difficulties and had to sell both this work and Rubens's The Crowning of the Virtuous Hero to the painter Gerard Hoet.

Both works later became part of the Landgrave of Hesse-Kassel's collection, from which they were both looted by Napoleon's troops - Crowning is now back in Kassel's Gemäldegalerie Alte Meister. Guild was taken in 1806 and assigned to Napoleon's wife Josephine Beauharnais, who kept it at her Château de Malmaison until 1814, when she sold it with 37 other works to Alexander I of Russia. It has been in the Hermitage ever since.

== Description ==
The background is Antwerp's Grote Markt, with the 1560s city hall on the left and Zilversmidstraat and the guild's base in the Huys van Spanien to the right. With over fifty people in the first and second rows, it is a guild group portrait, a popular genre in Flanders and the Dutch Republic between 1625 and 1650, the most famous of which is Rembrandt's The Night Watch, painted the previous year. Teniers himself had also approached the theme in a less static and ceremonial vein in The Guard Room.

Guild members are depicted in black dress with white collars and red cummerbunds. Three men also have red scarves over their shoulders - these are probably the leaders of the guild. To the left are a drummer and two men in yellow dress holding their muskets, whilst to the right is another man in yellow dress holds a standard at right and a priest in red, perhaps a cardinal, leans on a crossbow.

== Interpretation ==
As early as the mid 18th century Jean-Baptiste Descamps suggested that the work showed a parade by various artisan guilds. By contrast, Alfred Michiels considered that it showed an oath by the crossbowman guild, whereas Frans Jozef Peter van den Branden argued that it showed a parade for the anniversary of the Dean of the Gudeward Sneijders Guild. Margret Klinge considered that Van der Branden's theory is unlikely due to a lack of documentary evidence, but agreed that the picture depicts an unknown parade, as well as adding the detail that the guild's dean was then also mayor of Antwerp.
