= Self-Portrait in a Black Beret and Gold Chain =

1654 painting by Rembrandt

Self portrait with black baret and golden chain
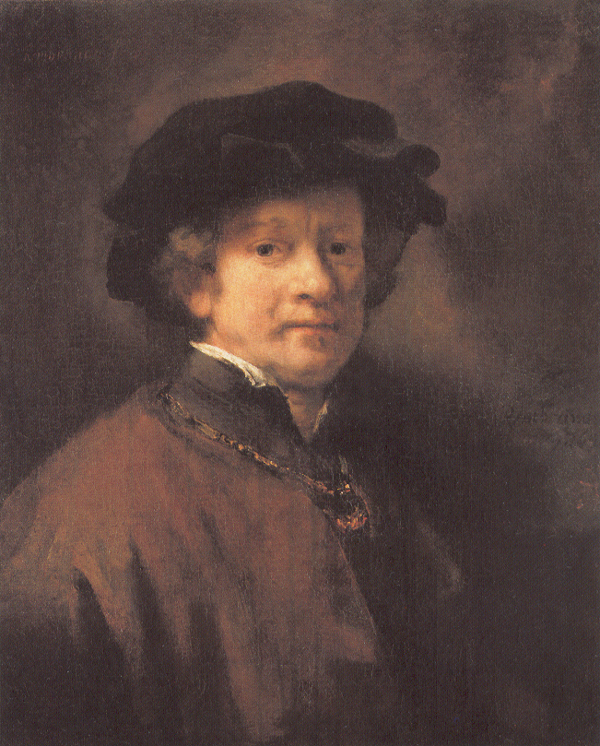
- Year: 1654
- Medium: oil paint, canvas
- Dimensions: 72 cm (28 in) × 58.5 cm (23.0 in)
- Accession: GK 244

Self-Portrait in a Black Beret and Gold Chain is a 1654 self-portrait attributed to Rembrandt, now in the Museum Schloss Wilhelmshöhe in Kassel.

== See also ==
- Self-portraits by Rembrandt
- List of paintings by Rembrandt

== Sources ==
- Self portrait with black baret and golden chain rembrandtdatabase.org
