= The Bean Feast =

Painting by the Dutch painter Jan Steen

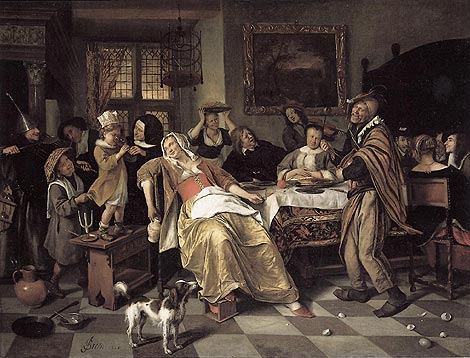
- Artist: Jan Steen
- Year: 1668
- Medium: Oil on canvas
- Dimensions: 100.5 cm × 125.5 cm (39.6 in × 49.4 in)
- Location: Gemäldegalerie Alte Meister (Kassel), Kassel

The Bean Feast is a 1668 oil painting by the Dutch artist Jan Steen, now in the Gemäldegalerie Alte Meister (Kassel), Germany.

In the 17th-century Low Countries a bean-feast was a celebration at which a goose would be eaten and a cake carved up between the people present. The person to receive the slice containing a bean would be crowned "king" for the night. Whenever he took a drink the rest would cheer.

In Steen's painting, a young boy standing on a bench and wearing a paper crown has earned the right to be king, and is being offered a drink by a fellow diner. His mother, somewhat the worse for wear, looks on with pride. In the middle of the floor a man, selected by the king as court jester, is playing the traditional rommelpot, a rudimentary instrument made by covering the mouth of a pot with animal skin and poking a stick through the membrane. Rubbing the stick makes a noise. Behind the young king another man is also playing the fool by wearing a metal funnel as a hat and making "music" with a ladle and gridiron.
