= Antonio Bellucci =

Italian painter

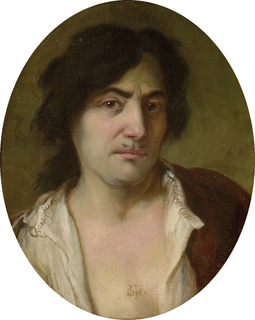
- A self-portrait of Antonio Bellucci, painted in 1684
- Born: 19 February 1654; Pieve di Soligo, Republic of Venice
- Died: 29 August 1726 (aged 72); Pieve di Soligo, Republic of Venice
- Known for: Painting
- Movement: Rococo
- Patrons: Johann Wilhelm II, Elector Palatine; James Brydges, 1st Duke of Chandos; Charles VI, Holy Roman Emperor

Antonio Bellucci (19 February 1654 – 29 August 1726) was an Italian soldier who became a painter of the Rococo period and is best known for his work in England, Germany, and Austria. He was one of the many Venetian-trained artists of his time, including Ricci, Tiepolo, Amigoni, and others, who sought commissions north of Italy, providing patrons with the then-popular Italianate grand-manner frescoes for private palaces.

== Biography ==
Born and died in Pieve di Soligo. He initially trained with Domenico Difnico in Sebenico (Šibenik) in Venetian Dalmatia (now part of Croatia). By 1675, he was working in Venice, painting St Lorenzo Giustiniani praying for the city’s deliverance from the plague of 1447 (c. 1691) for the church of San Pietro di Castello. He painted a Nativity for the church of the Ascension in Venice. Several of the landscapes of Antonio Tempesta are enriched with figures by Bellucci.

Among his pupils were Antonio Balestra and perhaps Jacopo Amigoni.

In 1692, he completed four altarpieces depicting various saints for the church of Klosterneuburg. From 1695 to 1700 and from 1702 to c. 1704, he lived in Vienna. He painted the Triumph of Hercules and other allegorical ceilings at the Palais Liechtenstein for Charles VI.

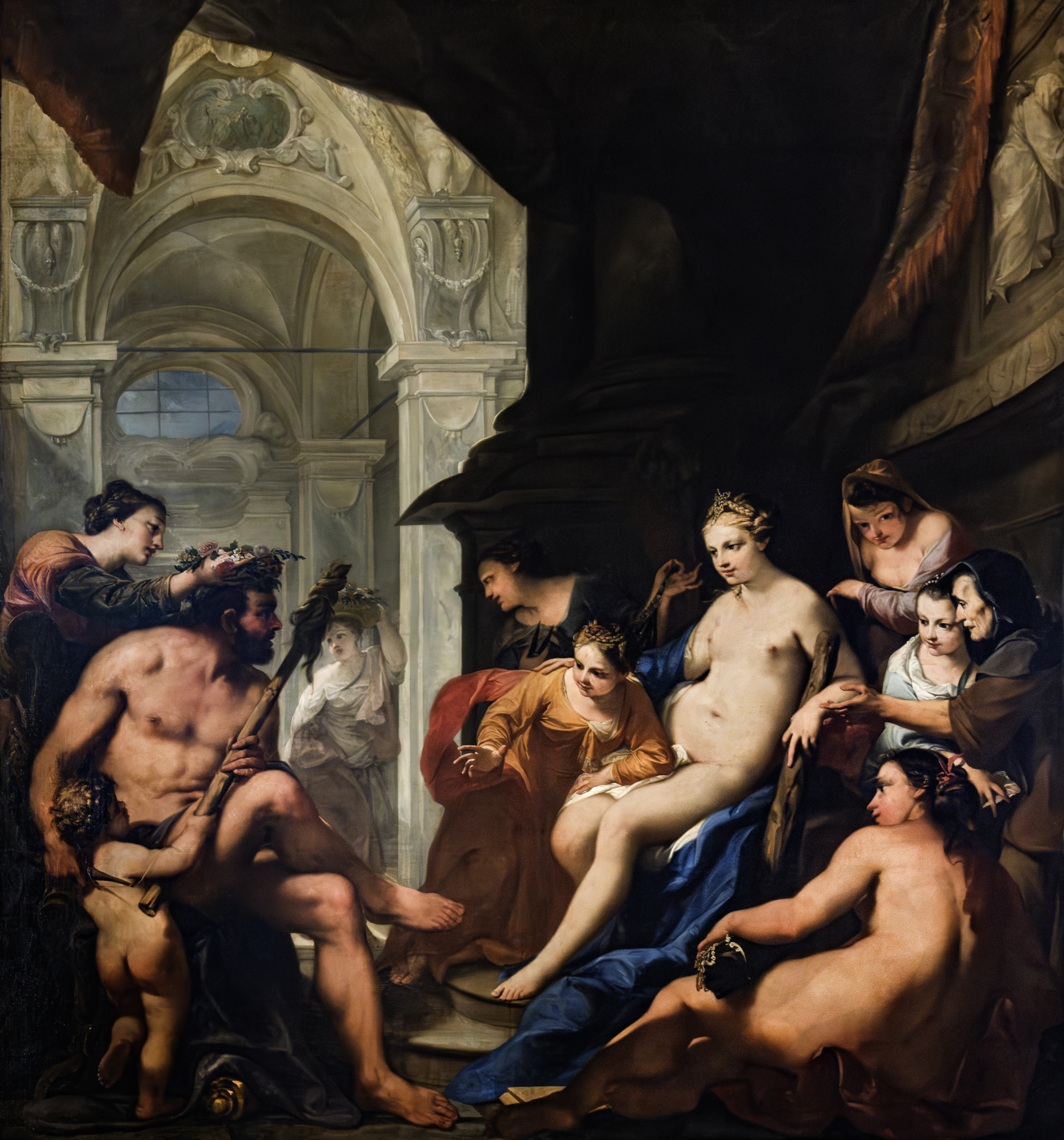
Ercole e Onfale (Hercules and Omphale) Lazzarini Room Ca' Rezzonico, Venice

== Career ==
From 1705 to 1716, he travelled to Düsseldorf to work for Johann Wilhelm, Elector of the Palatinate, a member of the Wittelsbach family; he worked there almost continuously until his patron's death in 1716. For Schloss Bensberg, he painted the Marriage of John William with Anna Maria Luisa de’ Medici and Elector Palatine John William Handing the Baton of Command to his Son.

From 1716 to 1722, Bellucci worked in England, where he fulfilled several commissions for James Brydges, 1st Duke of Chandos, including ceilings at Cannons, the duke's country seat near London; at the neighbouring St Lawrence, Whitchurch the paintings of the Nativity and the Descent from the Cross, which are seen on either side of the altar, and the Transfiguration, which is above the Duke's pew, are attributed to him. There is an almost Romantic self-portrait of Belluci, shirt open, at the Ashmolean Museum, Oxford. The reproduction here does not legibly show that on his breast is written the word 'pictor' (painter), perhaps indicating that to be an artist was his heart's desire. He returned to his native country late in life and died in Soligo.

== Works ==
- The King's Sick Son (c.1700) Gemäldegalerie Alte Meister (Kassel)
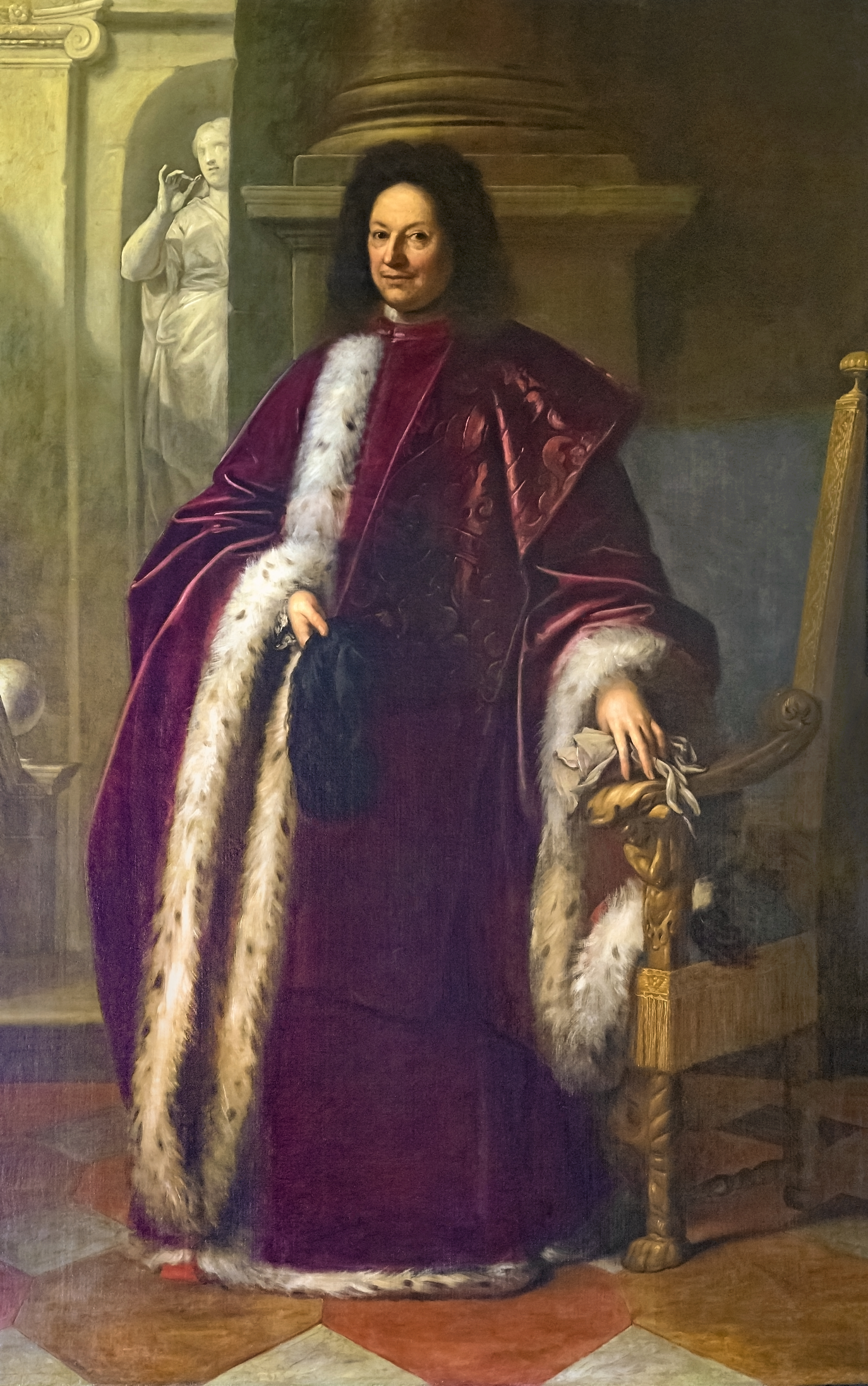
Portrait of Procurator, Ca' Rezzonico, Venice

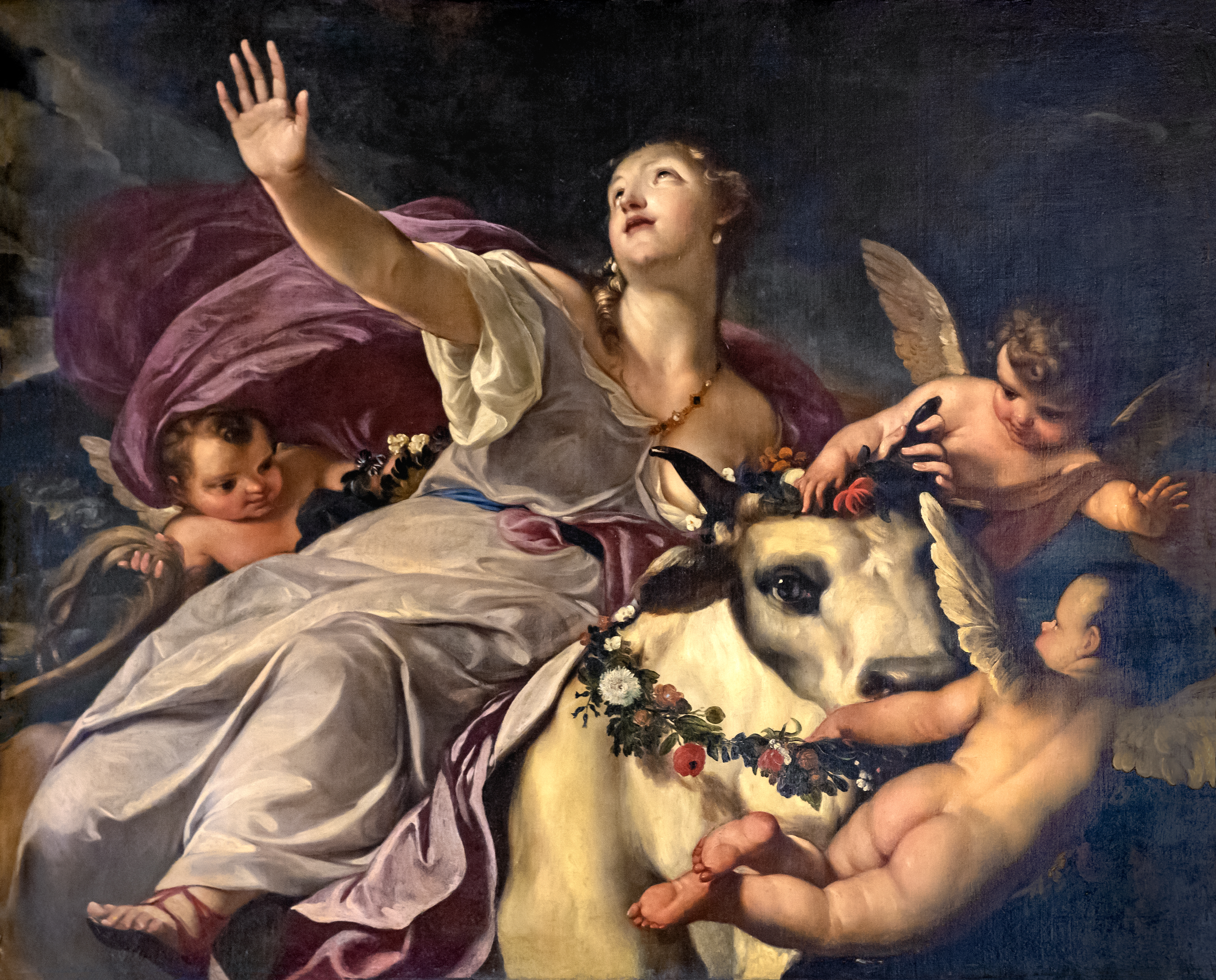
The Rape of Europa, Ca' Rezzonico, Venice

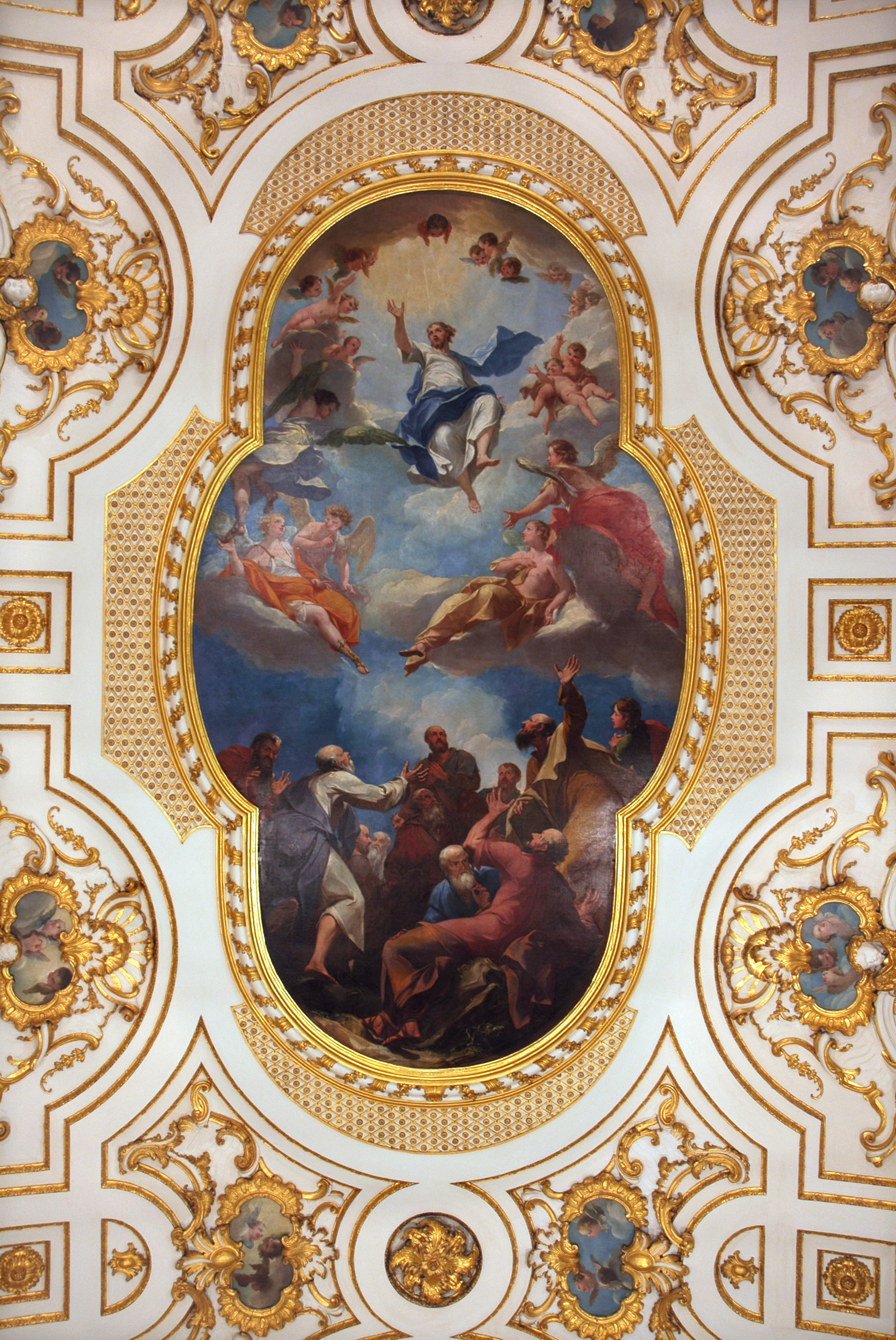
Ascension of Jesus Christ, Great Witley Church, Worcestershire
