= The Guard Room =

Painting by David Teniers the Younger

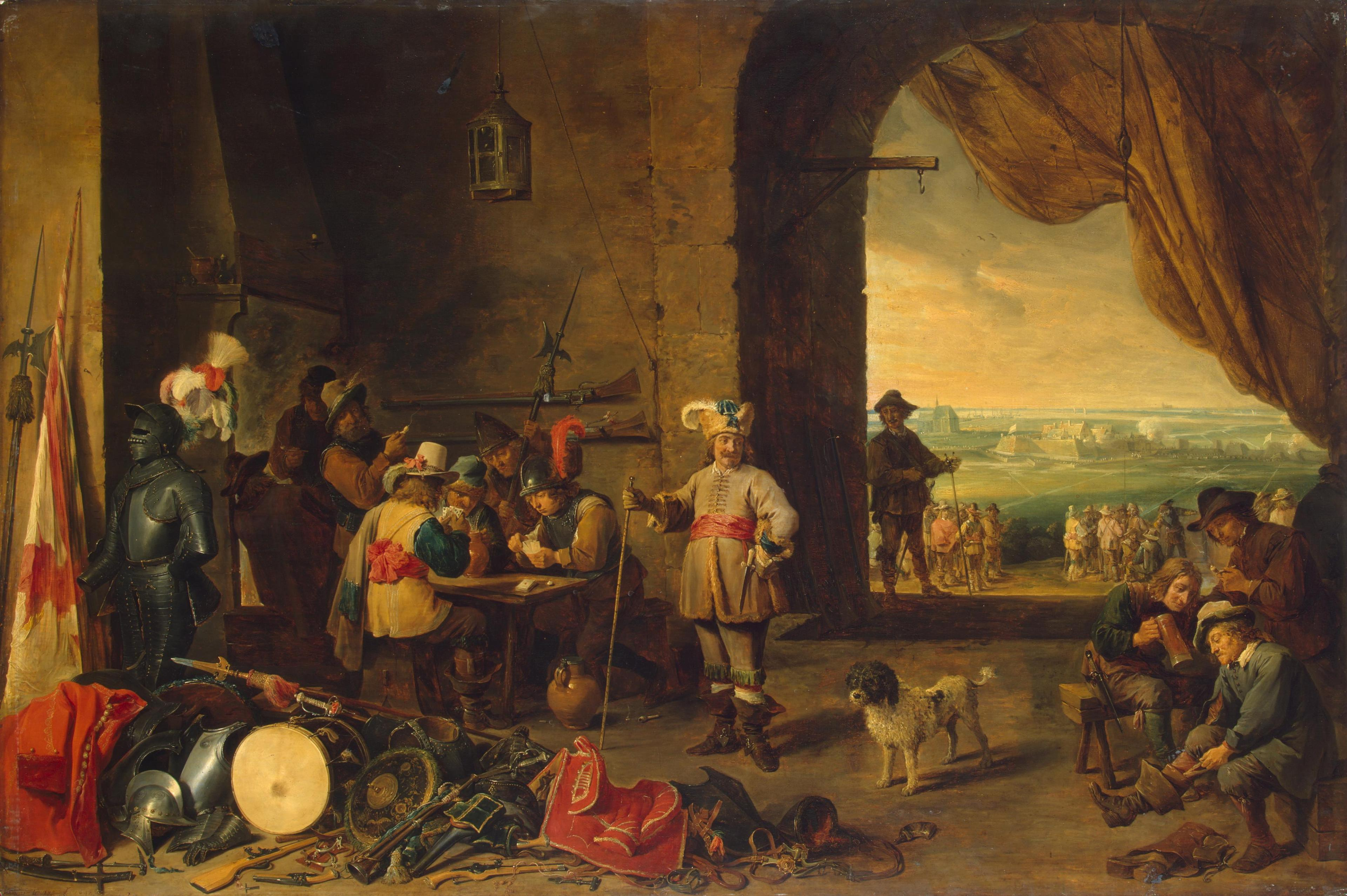
Guardroom (1642) by David Teniers the Younger

The Guard Room is a 1642 oil-on-panel painting by David Teniers the Younger, now in the Hermitage Museum in St Petersburg. It is signed and dated "David Teniers F. 1642" at the bottom left. Several unsigned but probably autograph variants also survive, such as at the Catherine Palace near St Petersburg and the Walters Art Museum in Baltimore, USA. An early copy by an unknown artist after the Hermitage work is now in the National Museum of Sweden.

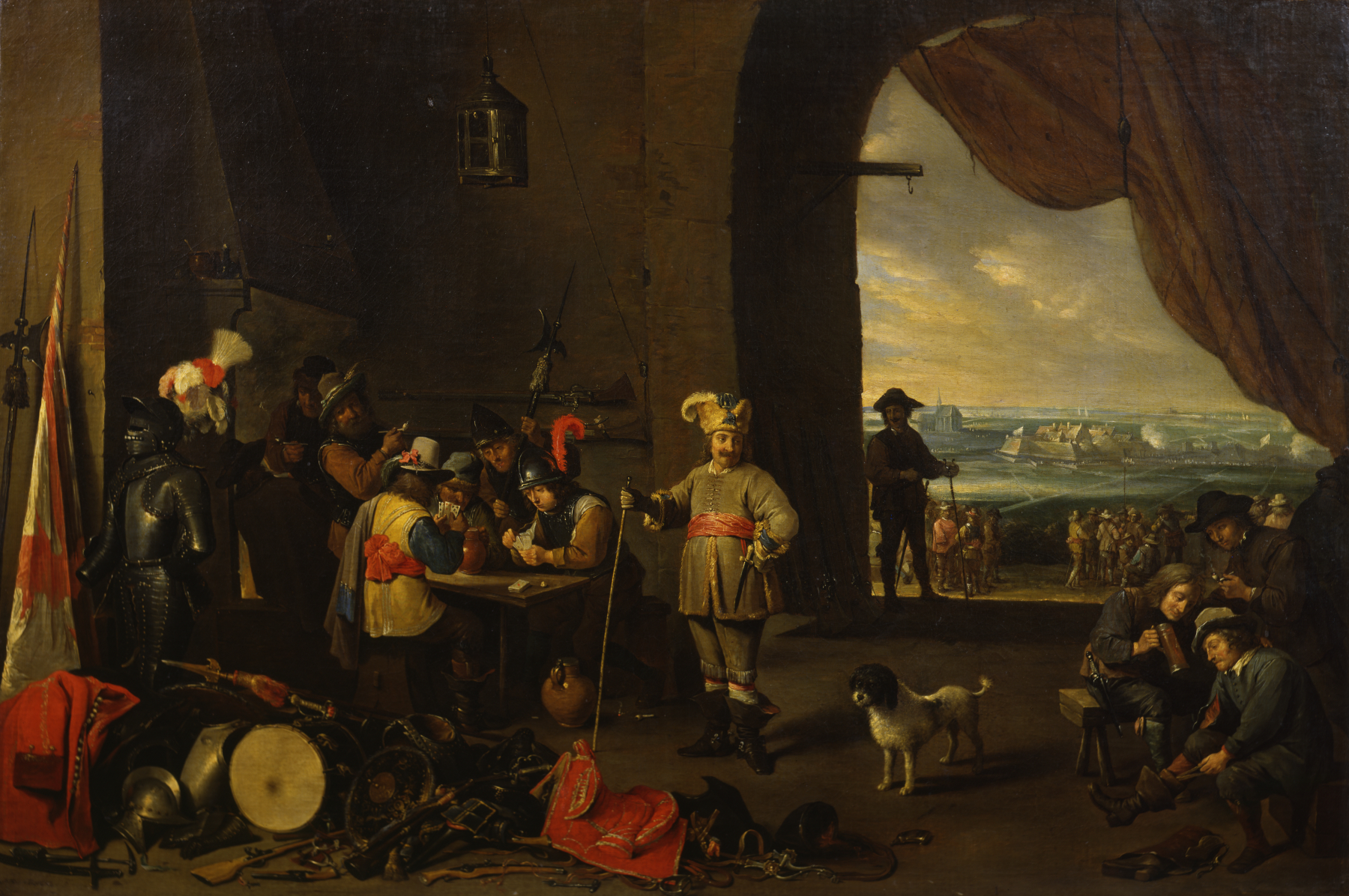
The Walters variant

It combines a still life of military uniforms, pistols, spears, sabres, shields and a drum in the foreground with a genre scene of military life in the middle ground and a battle scene in the background. It was painted the year when Francisco de Melo, new ruler of the Spanish Netherlands, twice defeated a French army, thus briefly holding back their advance on Antwerp. To some extent it anticipates his 1643 The Oude Voetboog Guild in the Grote Markt.

The work's provenance is unknown until 16 April 1738, when it was auctioned from the collection of Baron Schönborn. It then entered the collection of the Landgrave of Hesse-Kassel. In 1806 it was looted by Napoleon's troops and assigned to Joséphine de Beauharnais, who kept it at the Château de Malmaison. It was then sold to Alexander I of Russia with thirty-seven other works from Malmaison in 1814.
