= Hercules and Antaeus (Hans Baldung) =

1531 painting by Hans Baldung

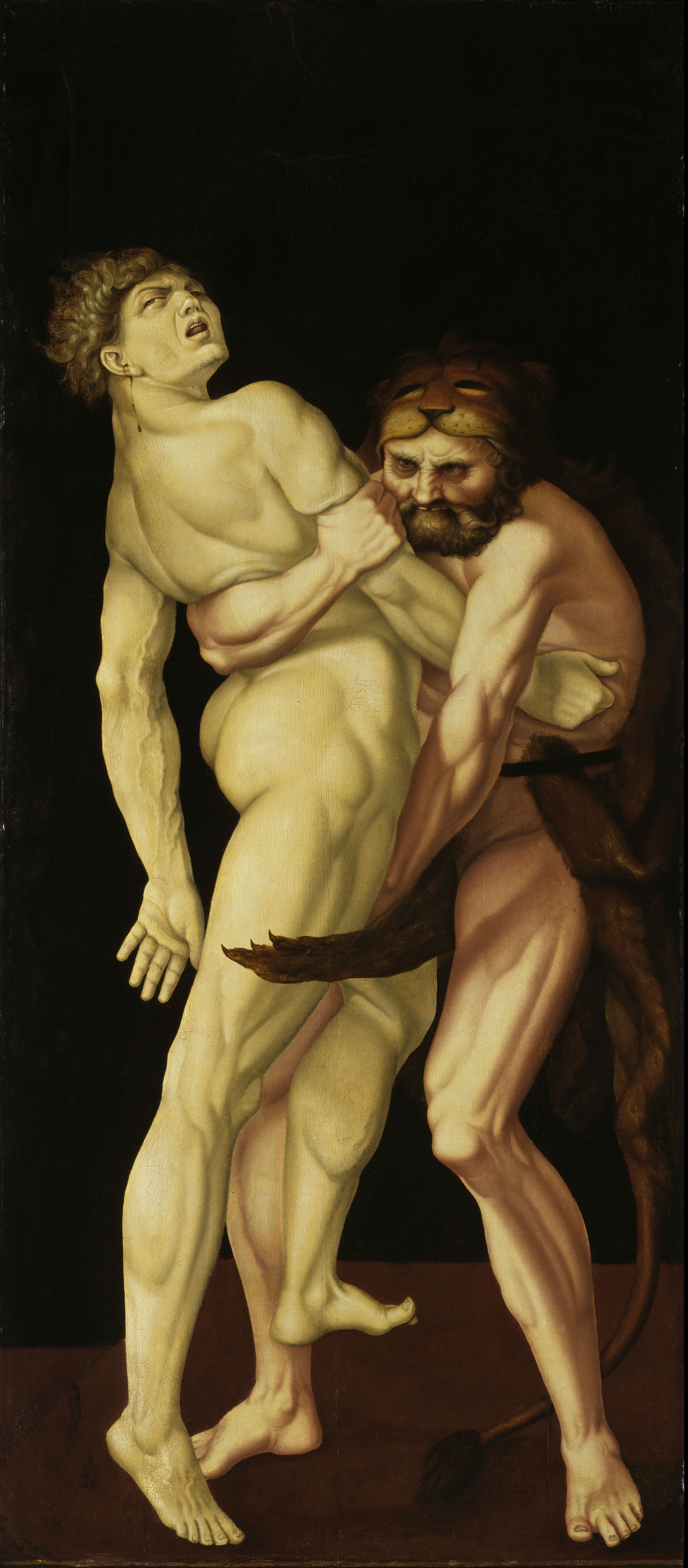
- Artist: Hans Baldung
- Year: 1531
- Medium: Oil on lime wood
- Dimensions: 153.5 cm × 65.3 cm (60.4 in × 25.7 in)
- Location: Gemäldegalerie Alte Meister (Kassel), Kassel

Hercules and Antaeus is a 1531 oil painting by German artist Hans Baldung. It was donated in 1892 by Edward Habich to the Gemäldegalerie Alte Meister (Kassel) in Germany, where it still hangs.

The work depicts the fight to the death between the bearded hero Hercules and the giant Antaeus, which occurred during Hercules' 11th labour, the stealing of the Apples of the Hesperides. Antaeus challenged and fought all strangers, killing every one, being invincible as long as he remained in contact with his mother, Gaia (The Earth). Hercules therefore lifted him off the ground and crushed him to death in a bearhug.

== Sources ==
- "Herkules und Antäus - Onlinedatenbank der Gemäldegalerie Alte Meister Kassel". altemeister.museum-kassel.de.
