= Portrait of a General =

Painting by Titian

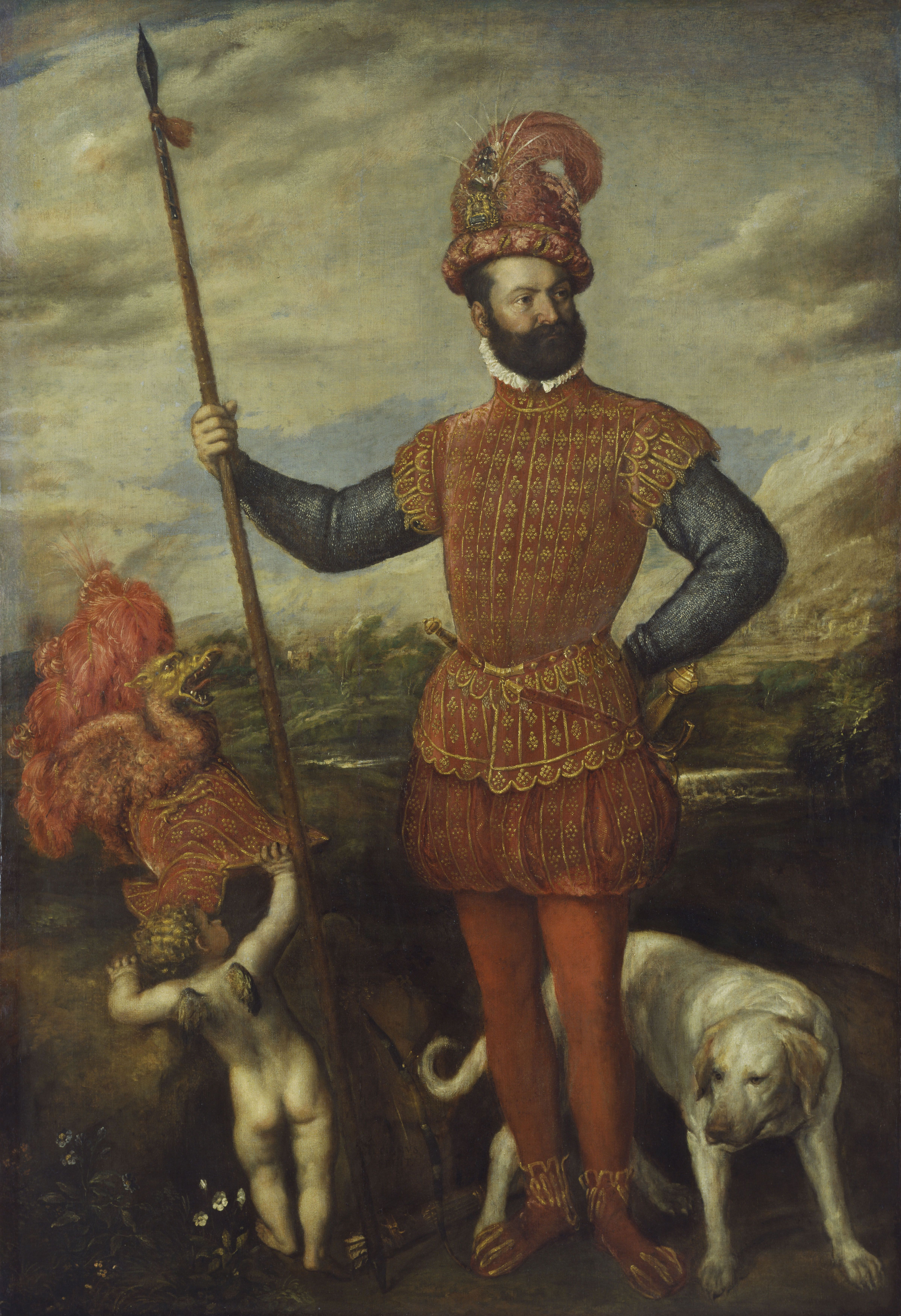
Portrait of a General (c. 1550) by Titian

Portrait of a General is a portrait of an unknown general by the Venetian artist Titian, from c. 1550. It is now in the Gemäldegalerie Alte Meister, in Kassel.

== Description ==
The life-size portrait probably shows Giovanni Frances Acquavita, Duke of Atri. The imposing appearance of the person depicted suggests that he is an important general, whom Titian portrayed with great inventiveness and richly nuanced coloring. The general, depicted in Titian-red robes, chain mail, lance and hunting dog, in whom the Renaissance man's claim to power is evident, represents the embodiment of the god of war, Mars. Cupid plays with the weapons of the Roman god in front of a river landscape, the fluffy, illusionistic style of which creates a threatening atmospheric effect. The landscape was not added by Titian until 1560.

== Sources ==
- "Bildnis eines Feldherrn - Onlinedatenbank der Gemäldegalerie Alte Meister Kassel". altemeister.museum-kassel.de.
