= The King's Sick Son =

Painting by Antonio Bellucci

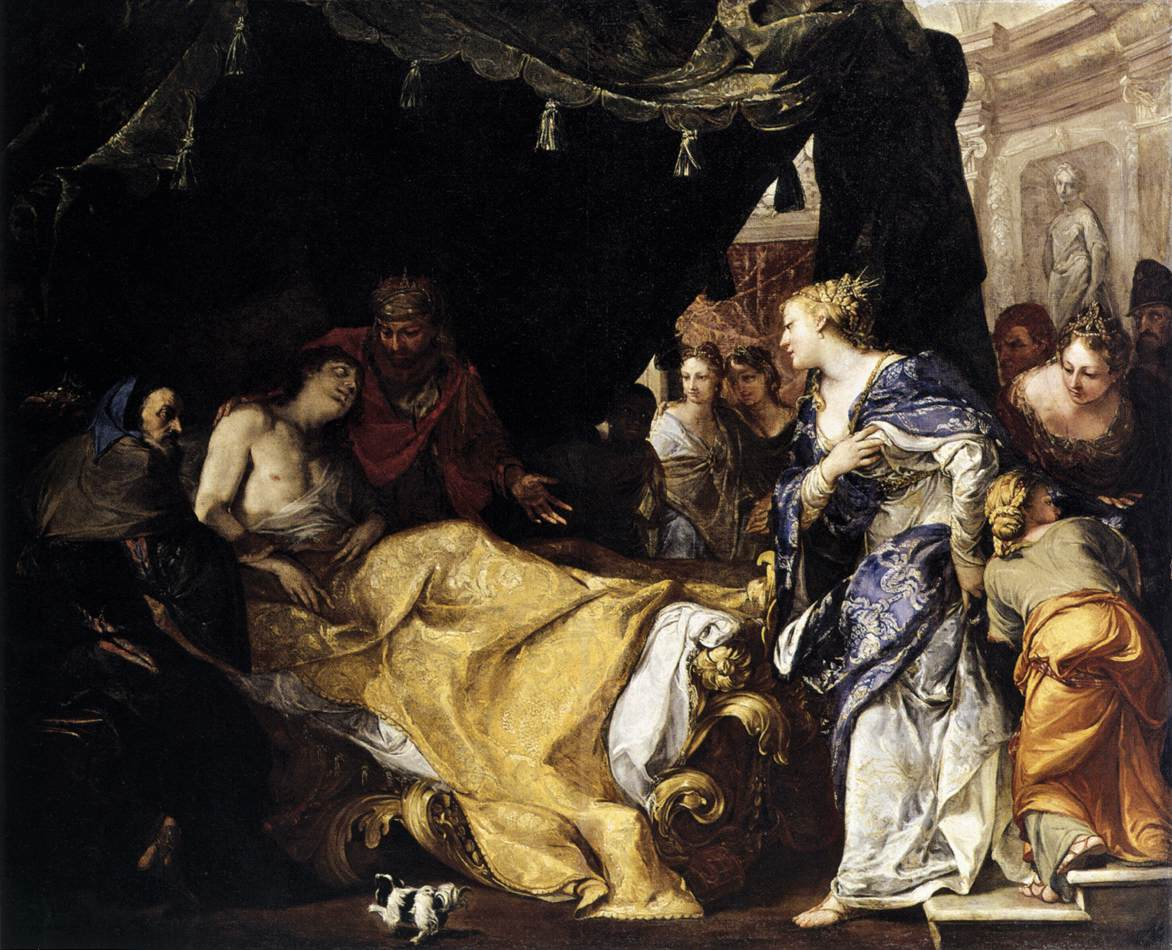
The King's Sick Son (c. 1700) by Antonio Bellucci

The King's Sick Son or Antiochus and Stratonice is a c.1700 painting by the Italian painter Antonio Bellucci, now in the Gemäldegalerie Alte Meister (Kassel). Also painted by David and Ingres, the subject is Antiochus falling mortally ill after secretly falling in love with his father's new wife Stratonice of Syria.

Goethe saw the painting as a young man and described it several times in Wilhelm Meister's Journeyman Years (1821).

== Sources ==
- Gemäldegalerie Alte Meister Schloss Wilhelmshöhe Kassel. Georg Westermann Verlag, Braunschweig 1981.
