= Gemäldegalerie Alte Meister (Kassel) =

Art gallery in Kassel, Germany

Coordinates: 51.3150°N 9.4161°E

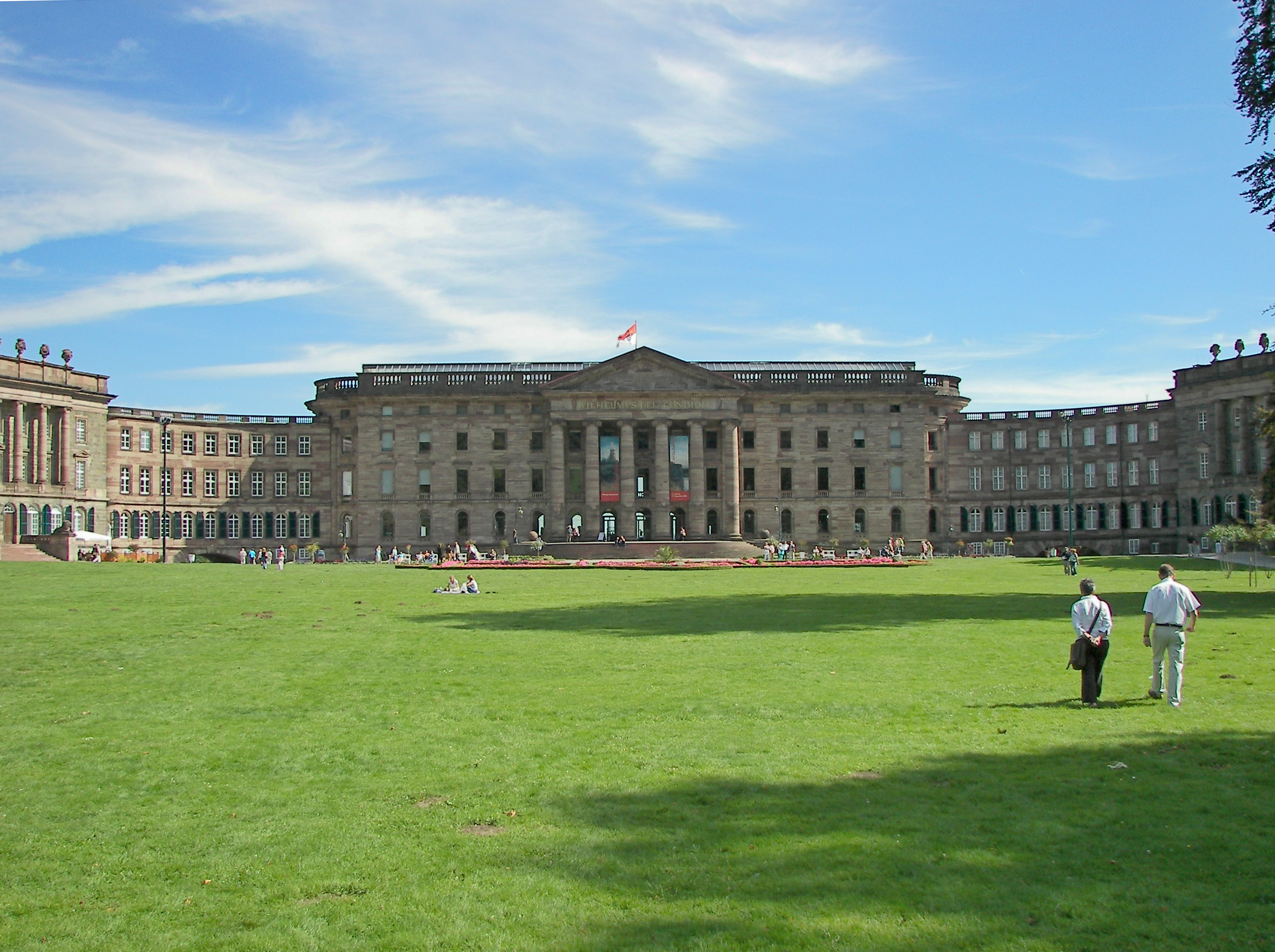
- Wilhelmshöhe Palace
- Established: 1974
- Type: Art museum
- Website: Gemäldegalerie Alte Meister (Kassel)

The Gemäldegalerie Alte Meister is an art gallery housed in the Schloss Wilhelmshöhe in Kassel in Germany. It is based on the collection of William VIII, Landgrave of Hesse-Kassel.

== Collection ==
The core of the art collection consists of 17th-century Flemish and Dutch paintings, which can be traced back primarily to the collecting passion of Landgrave William VIII of Hesse-Kassel (reigned 1751–1760).

The dedicated galleries showcase leading figures of the Dutch and Flemish Baroque painting, such as Rembrandt, Frans Hals, Peter Paul Rubens, Anthony van Dyck, and Jacob Jordaens. The Rembrandt Gallery displays Jacob Blessing the Sons of Joseph and Portrait of Saskia, alongside others of his famous paintings. Major works by Rubens on view include The Crowning of the Virtuous Hero, the Portrait of Nicolas de Respaigne, and Pan and Syrinx. The Frans Hals Gallery exhibits famous paintings such as The Man with the Slouch Hat and The Merry Drinker. Jan Steen is represented by the oil painting The Feast of Saint Nicholas (often referred to as The Bean Feast).

Furthermore, the collection presents Italian, Spanish, and French paintings, including works by Titian, Bartolomé Esteban Murillo, and Simon Vouet. Works on display include Titian's Portrait of a General, Giampietrino's Leda with Her Children, and Antonio Bellucci's The King's Sick Son. Early German and Early Netherlandish paintings constitute a smaller portion of the collection but are impressive; highlights include Albrecht Dürer's Portrait of Elsbeth Tucher, Hans Baldung's Hercules and Antaeus, and works by Jan Gossaert and Maarten van Heemskerck.

== Collection history ==
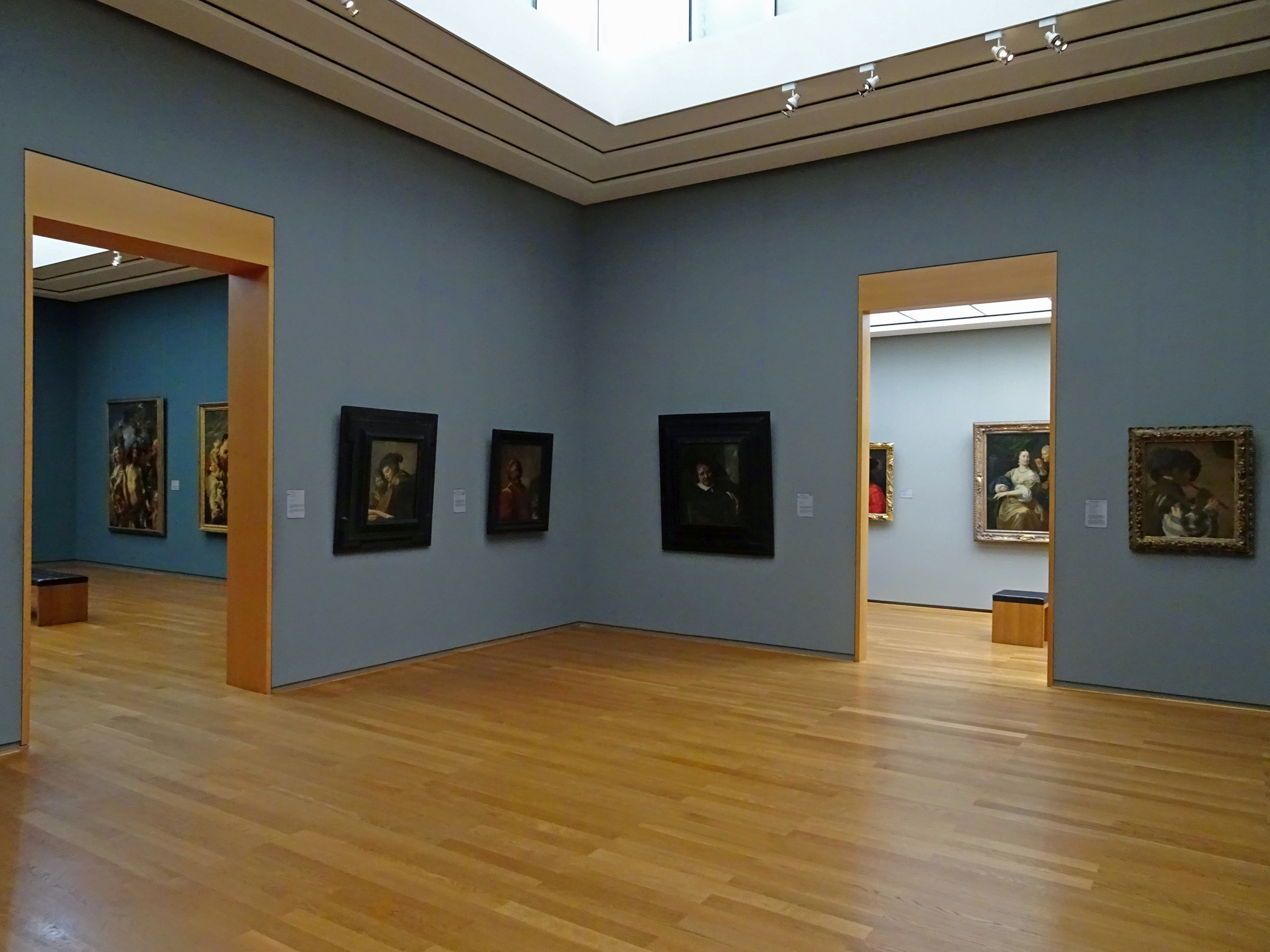
View of the collections

The first painting associated with the Landgrave’s collection was commissioned from Lucas Cranach the Elder by Anne of Mecklenburg in memory of Landgrave William II (1485–1509). The cabinet was first mentioned in 1653, and in 1696 the collection was housed in the Ottoneum, a building that had originally served as a theater. The collection was characterized more as a treasury and cabinet of curiosities, as it encompassed scientific objects and oddities alongside paintings.

Under Landgrave Charles I (1654–1730), several important artworks by Rembrandt, Rubens, and followers of Caravaggio arrived in Kassel. The collection was most significantly shaped by Landgrave William VIII; his passion for collecting — particularly in the realm of Dutch and Flemish painting — reached its peak in the mid-18th century, aided by his Dutch contacts and highly knowledgeable advisors. William VIII succeeded in acquiring major works by Rubens (Triumph of the Victor), Rembrandt (Jacob Blessing the Sons of Joseph), Frans Hals, and Jan Steen (The Bean Feast). The purchase of the Valerius Röver cabinet also represented a high-quality addition.

The growing collection prompted the construction of a gallery building, completed in 1751 (and destroyed in 1943); however, this was merely part of a larger project intended to include additional buildings. In the spirit of the Enlightenment, William's successor, Landgrave Frederick II (1760–1785), opened the collection to a select public.

The era of Napoleon — whose brother Jérôme Bonaparte resided in Kassel — can be described as the collection's darkest chapter. In 1806, an attempt was made to safeguard 48 masterpieces, including Claude Lorrain's cycle depicting the times of day, from the Napoleonic troops; nevertheless, they came into the possession of Empress Joséphine de Beauharnais, who used them to furnish her Château de Malmaison, near Paris. After her death, a large portion of these paintings passed to the Hermitage in Saint Petersburg, Russia. Many other paintings were selected by Vivant Denon for the Musée Napoléon but were successfully returned to Kassel between 1814 and 1817 by Jacob Grimm and his delegation, which included the gallery inspector Ernst Friedrich Ferdinand Robert. Under Prussian rule, the collection moved in 1877 to the gallery building at "Schöne Aussicht" designed by Heinrich von Dehn-Rotfelser; this building now houses the Neue Gallerie.

The artworks escaped the perils of the Second World War thanks to their early relocation to a safe site. A selection of the finest pieces was sent to the Kunsthistorisches Museum, in Vienna, and returned to Kassel undamaged in 1956. Today, the comprehensive collection, housed at Wilhelmshöhe Palace since 1974, is complemented by various new acquisitions and long-term loans.

In 1977, a mentally disturbed man, Hans-Joachim Bohlmann, carried out an acid attack on four of the collection's most famous works; their subsequent restoration was not completed until 2006. The affected paintings were Rembrandt's Jacob Blessing the Sons of Joseph and his Self-Portrait with Beret, Nicolaes Maes's The Apostle Thomas, and Willem Drost's Christ Appearing to Mary Magdalene as a Gardener.

== Works from the Gallery of the Old Masters ==
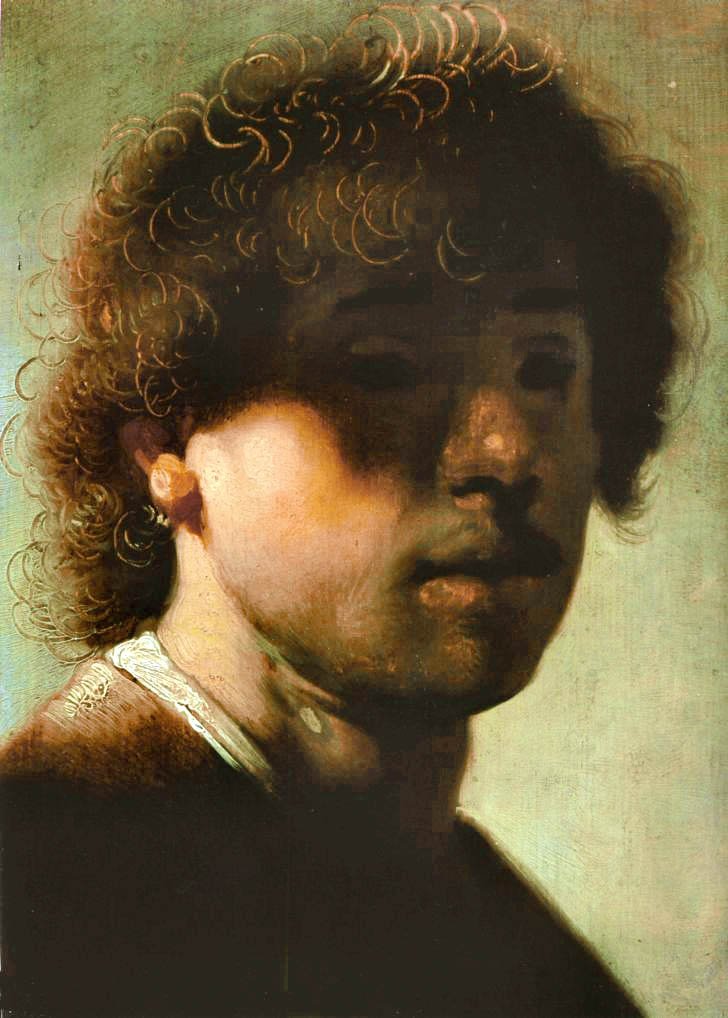
Rembrandts Self-Portrait

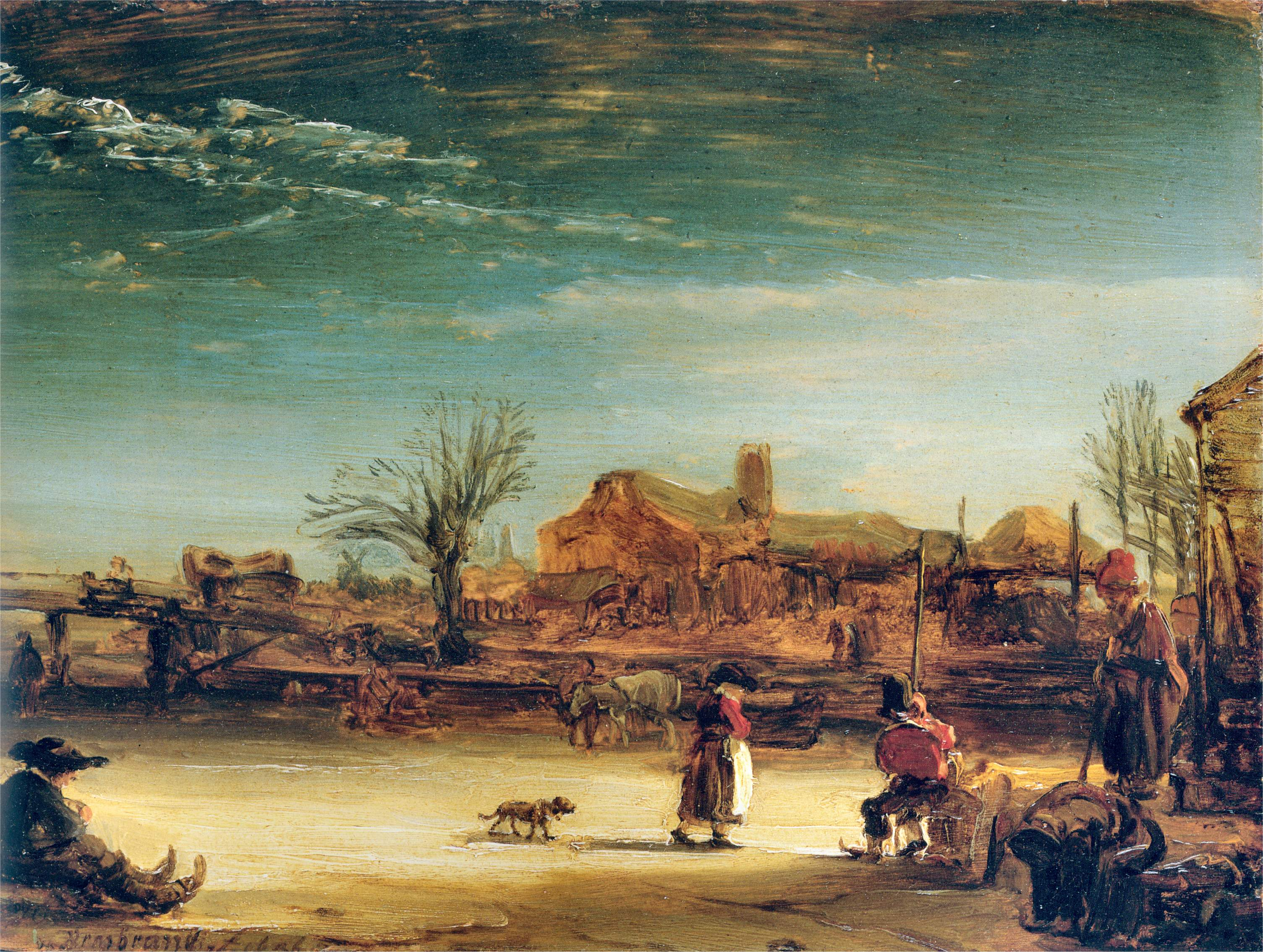
Rembrandts Winterlandscape

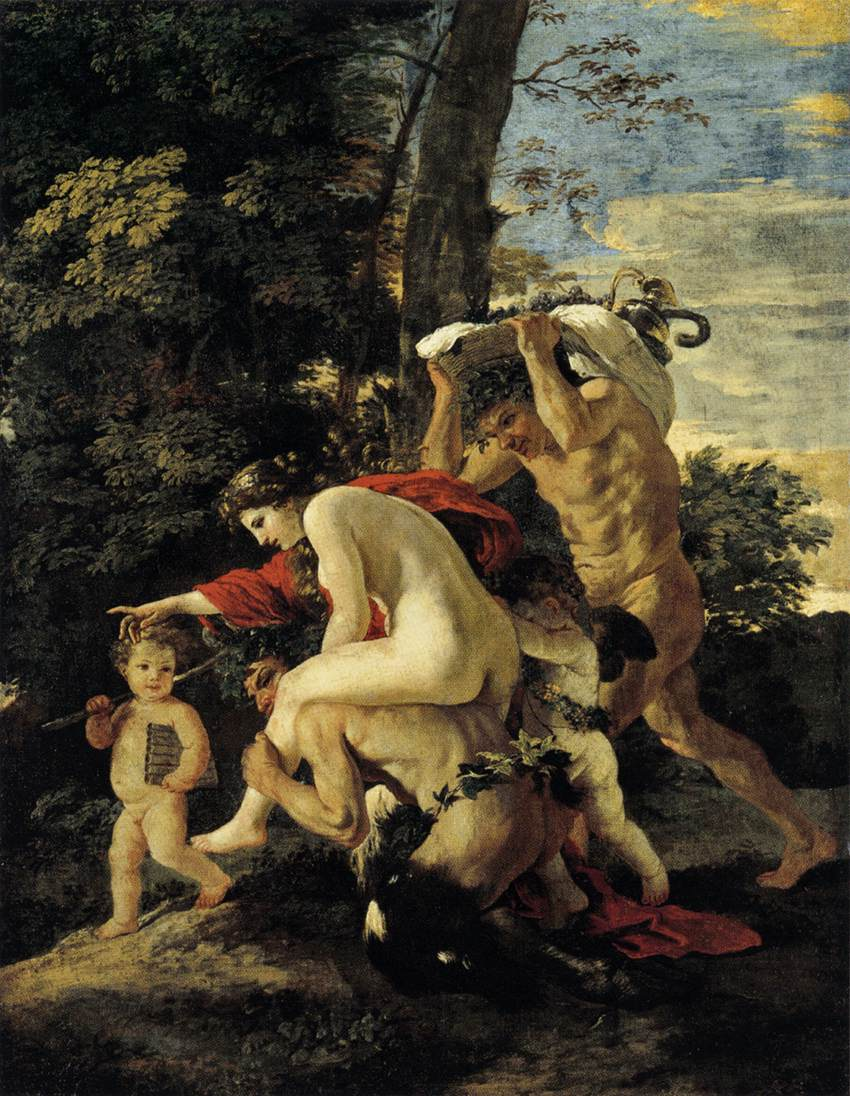
Bacchic Scene by Nicolas Poussin

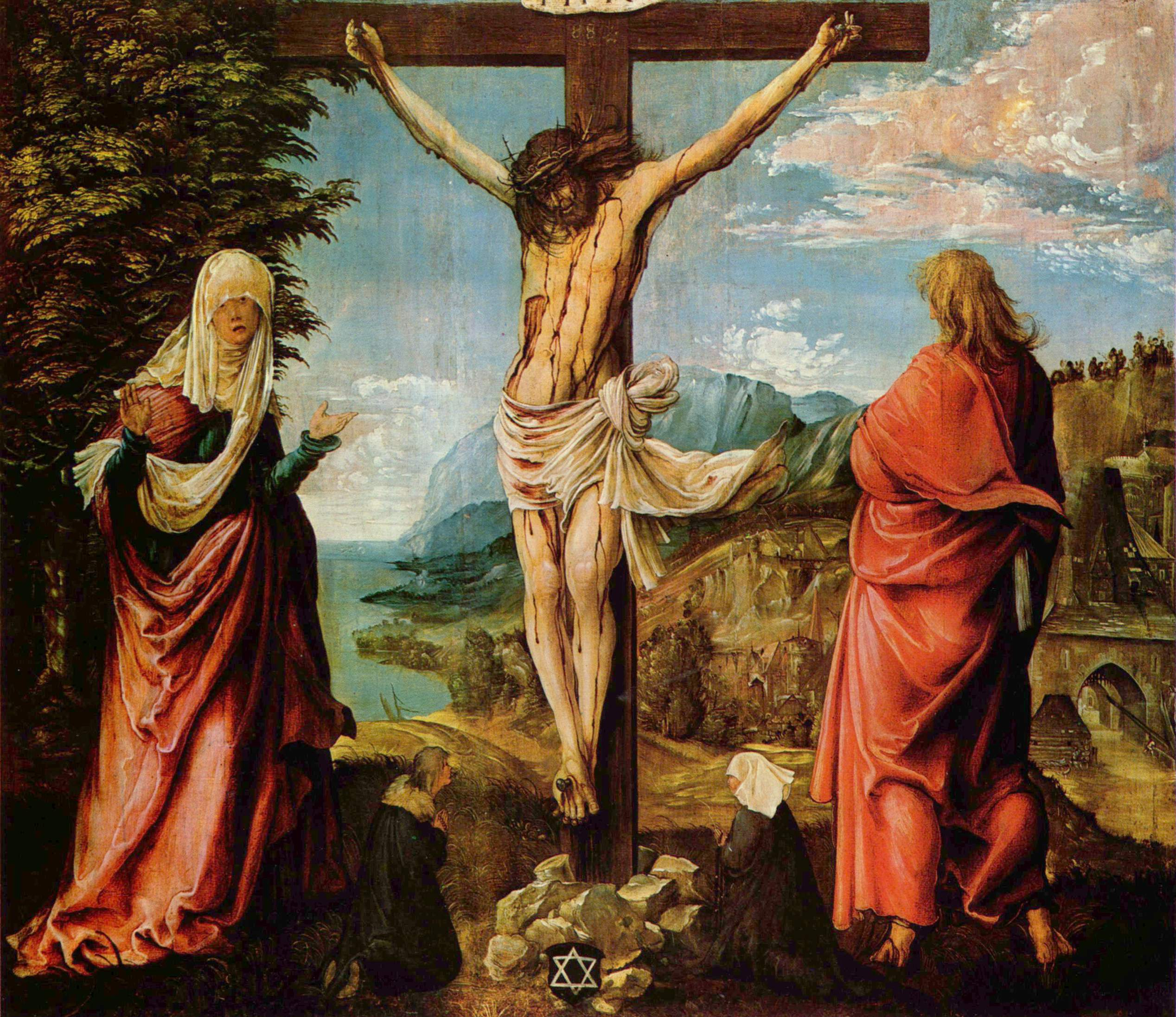
Kreuzigung Albrecht Altdorfer, 1515-1516

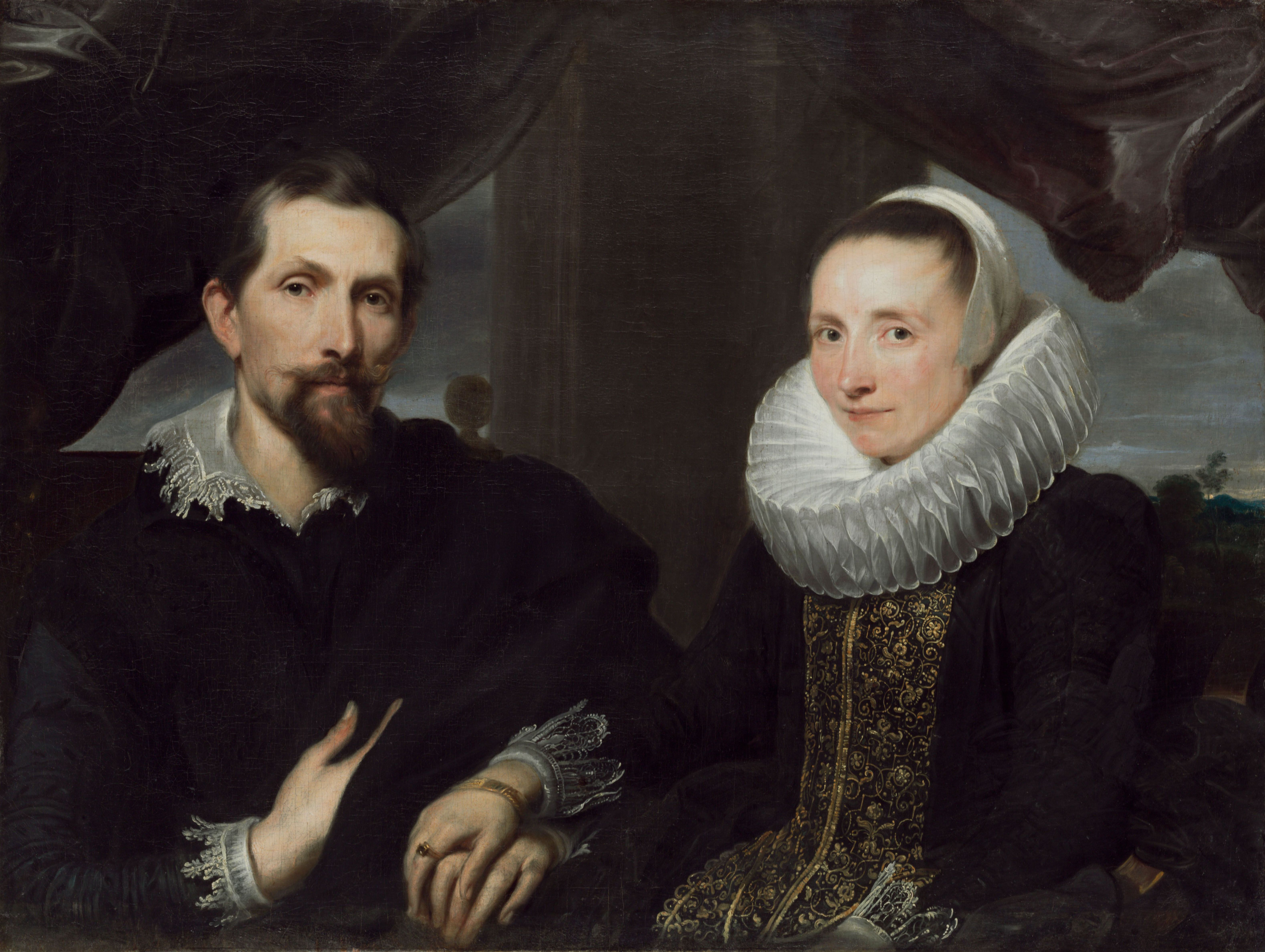
Frans Snyders and his wife, Anthony van Dyck, 1st third of 17th century

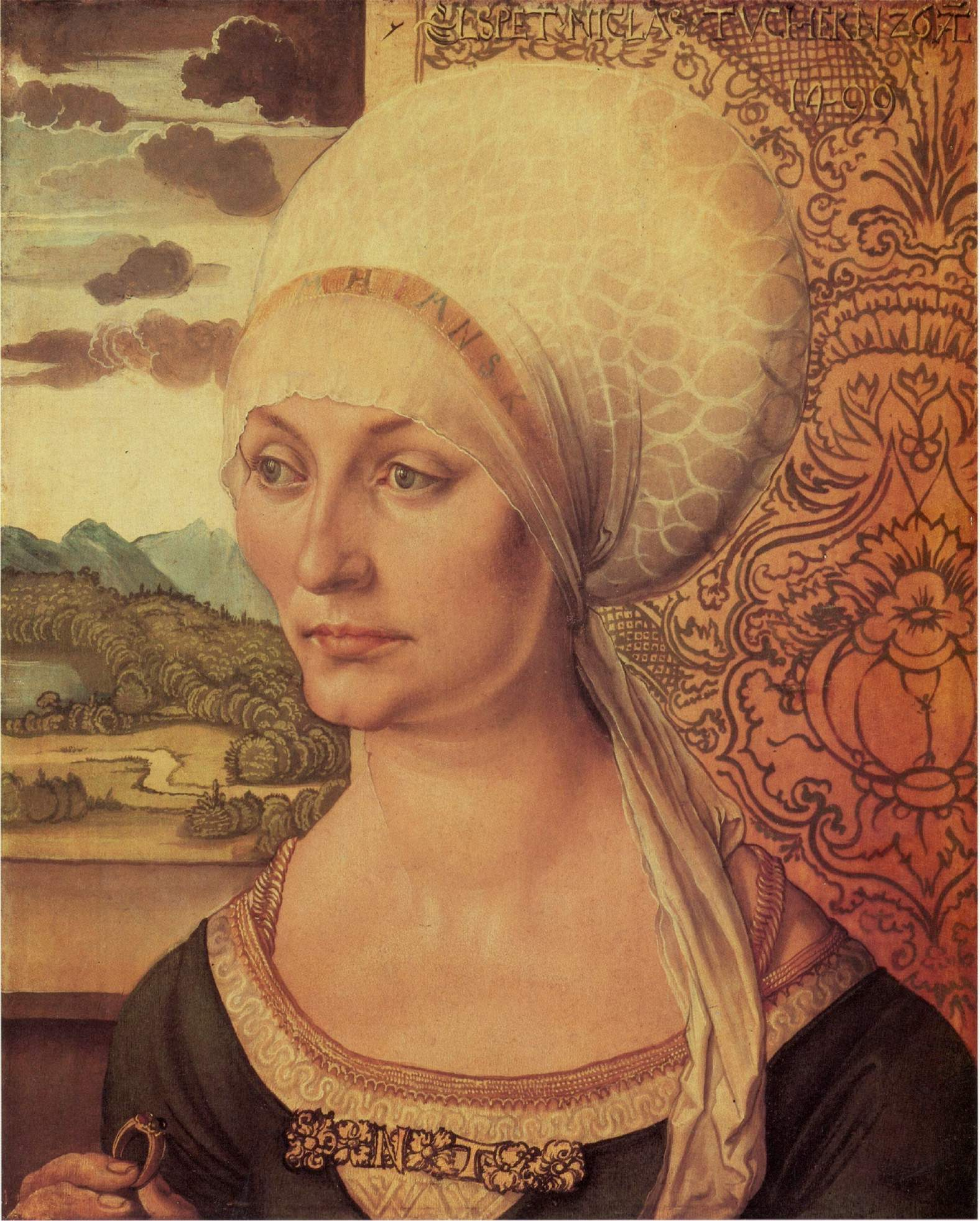
Portrait of Elsbeth Tucher from 1499 in the "Gallery of the Old Masters". This work of Albrecht Dürer was reproduced on the West German Banknote of 20 Marks

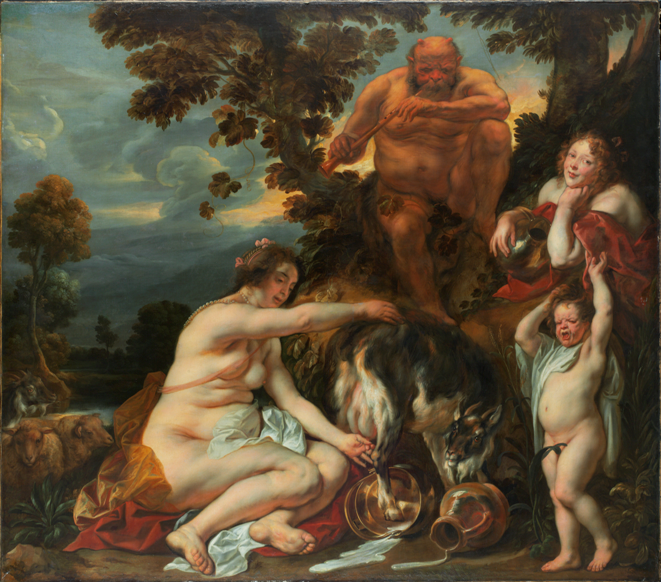
Jupiter Raised by the Nymph Adrasteia by Jacob Jordaens, 17th century.
