= Jupiter Raised by the Nymph Adrasteia =

Painting by Jacob Jordaens

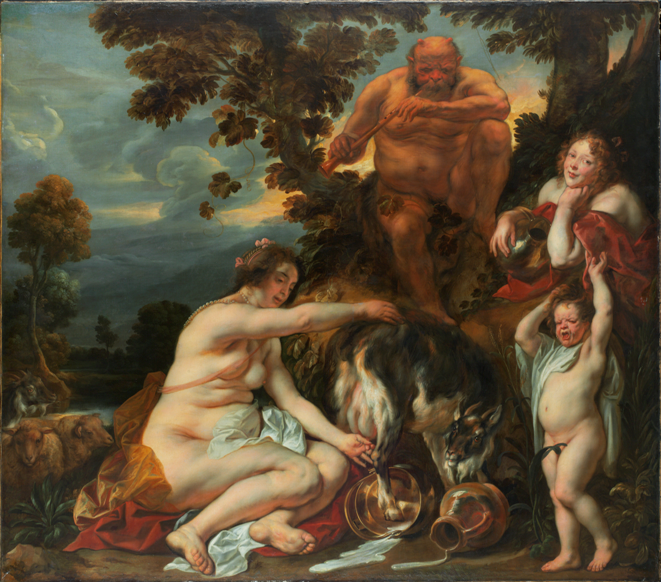
- Artist: Jacob Jordaens
- Year: c. 1640
- Medium: Oil on canvas
- Movement: Flemish Baroque
- Dimensions: 219 cm × 247 cm (86 in × 97 in)
- Location: Gemäldegalerie Alte Meister; Kassel

Jupiter Raised by the Nymph Adrasteia or The Childhood of Jupiter is an oil on canvas painting by the Flemish artist Jacob Jordaens, from c. 1640. It is held at the Gemäldegalerie Alte Meister, in Kassel. It shows the infant Jupiter being raised by the nymph Adrasteia.

== Description ==
The daughters of Melisseus, Adraste and Ida, where charged by Rhea with the mission of raising the young Jupiter in the Dictaean Cave on Crete. The boy Jupiter is shown crying in front of the cave because the goat Amalthea, whose milk nourishes him, has overturned the milk vessel and stepped into it with her hind legs. Jordaens’s mythological scene brings the ancient legend vividly to life.

On the left, the nude Adraste is depicted beside a flock of sheep, turning toward the goat Amalthea, which resists being milked. Pan sits beneath a tree playing his flute to drown out the cries of the child, while beside him Ide holds another milk vessel. On the far right appears the angry young Jupiter, lamenting the mishap. Jordaens’s painting relies heavily on tonal values, without striking or contrasting use of color.

== Sources ==
- (in German) Gemäldegalerie Alte Meister Schloss Wilhelmshöhe. 2. Auflage. Westermann. Braunschweig 1982, pages 50−51.
- "Die Kindheit des Jupiter - Onlinedatenbank der Gemäldegalerie Alte Meister Kassel". altemeister.museum-kassel.de.
