= The Crowning of the Virtuous Hero =

Painting by Peter Paul Rubens

The Coronation of the Virtuous Hero
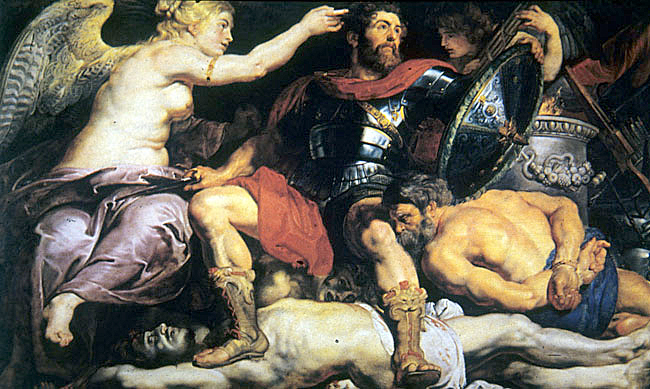
- Artist: Peter Paul Rubens
- Year: c. 1613–14
- Medium: Oil on canvas
- Location: Schloss Wilhelmshöhe, Kassel

The Crowning of the Virtuous Hero is a painting by Peter Paul Rubens, painted between 1613 and 1614. Unsigned, it was commissioned by the St George Guild of Archers in Antwerp for their banqueting hall and is now in the Gemäldegalerie Alte Meister within the Schloss Wilhelmshöhe in Kassel.

== Description ==
It shows an ancient Roman general being crowned by Nike with laurels of victory and treading underfoot a bound barbarian and a personification of Discord (shown with snakes for hair). To his right is a genius of Harmony, who presents him with a bound bundle of arrows (symbolising peace). The figure on the right is also intended as the guardian of religion, due to the eternal fire shown on the altar beside the figure. Behind the altar is a red and white tricolour, referring to the ruling house of Habsburg and thus affirming the guild's loyalty to that house.

== History ==
William VIII, Landgrave of Hesse-Kassel acquired the painting between 1730 and 1760 to add to his collection of Dutch paintings at the Schloss Bellevue in Kassel's Oberneustadt or upper new town. The Peace of Tilsit in 1807 made Kassel the capital of the Kingdom of Westphalia, under Jerome Bonaparte - later that year Jerome's brother Napoleon I acquired the painting and assigned it to the imperial coronation hall in Paris. In 1813 general Czerniczew forced Jerome Bonaparte to flee and negotiations began for the return of this and other paintings confiscated by Napoleon. Jacob Grimm (then a legation secretary) played an instrumental part in gaining the return of the Rubens, which occurred in December 1815.

Between 1878 and 1943, the painting was in the Neue Galerie at the Schloss Bellevue. In 1943 the painting was moved to a store elsewhere - Kassel was a target for Allied bombing and the Schloss Wilhelmshöhe was severely damaged. In 1956 the painting was moved to emergency headquarters of the Landesmuseum until in April 1974 it returned to Kassel, initially in the Corps de Logis at the Schloss Wilhelmshöhe.

== Bibliography ==
- Alte Meister Schloss Wilhelmshöhe Kassel. Georg Westermann Verlag, Braunschweig 1982, S. 38-45
- Eduard Brauns: Wander und Reiseführer durch Nordhessen und Waldeck. A. Bernecker Verlag, Melsungen 1971, S. 20 u. 21
- Friedhelm Häring Hans, Joachim Klein (Hrsg.): DuMont Kunst- Reiseführer Hessen. DuMont Buchverlag Köln, 8. Auflage 1988, S. 56
- Jürgen Weishaupt: Kasseler Kostbarkeiten. Verlag Thiele & Schwarz, Kassel 1981, S. 8 u. 66
