= Wilhelmshöhe Palace =

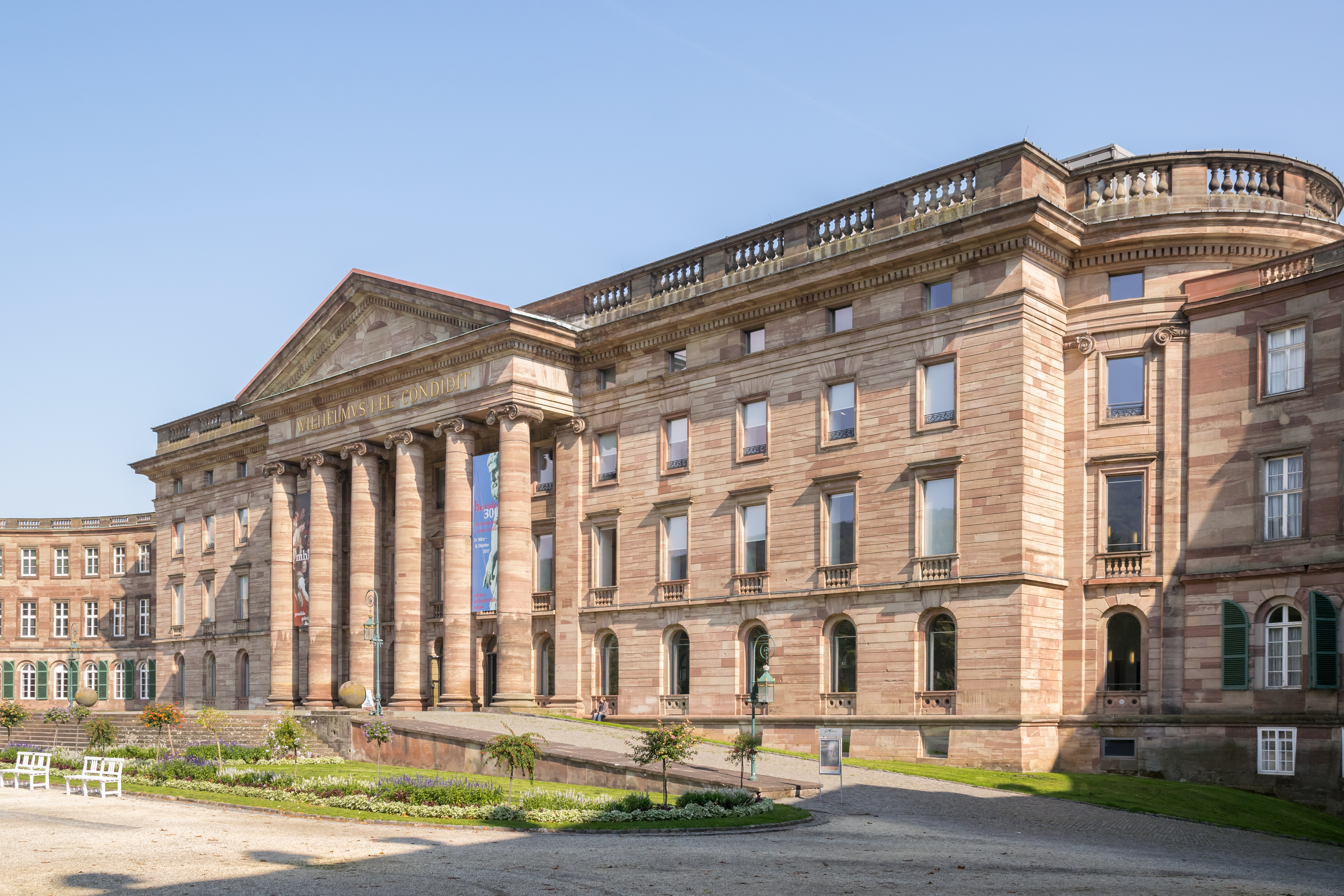
- Wilhelmshöhe Palace in 2017

- Location within Hesse Location within Germany

General information
- Type: Palace
- Architectural style: Neoclassical
- Location: Kassel, Germany
- Coordinates: 51°18′54″N 9°24′58″E
- Construction started: 1786
- Completed: 1798
- Renovated: 1968–1974, 1994–2000
- Client: William I, Elector of Hesse
- Owner: Museumslandschaft Hessen Kassel

Design and construction
- Architects: Simon Louis du Ry, Heinrich Christoph Jussow

The Wilhelmshöhe Palace (German: Schloss Wilhelmshöhe) is a Neoclassical palace located in Bad Wilhelmshöhe, a part of Kassel, Germany. It was built for Landgrave Wilhelm (William) IX of Hesse in the late 18th century. Emperor Wilhelm II made extensive use of it as a summer residence and personal retreat.

Today, the palace houses the art gallery Gemäldegalerie Alte Meister, part of Museumslandschaft Hessen Kassel. Since 2013, the Wilhelmshöhe Palace has been part of the UNESCO World Heritage Site Bergpark Wilhelmshöhe because of its contribution to Baroque architecture and the outstanding water features that surround the palace.

== History ==
Beginning in the 12th century the site was used as a monastery. Under Philip I, Landgrave of Hesse 1504-1567 it was secularised and used as a castle. This castle was replaced by a new one from 1606 to 1610 by Landgrave Moritz. The current Neoclassical Schloss Wilhelmshöhe was designed by architects Simon Louis du Ry and Heinrich Christoph Jussow from 1786 to 1798 for Landgrave William IX of Hesse.

As king of the Kingdom of Westphalia, Jérôme Bonaparte renamed it Napoleonshöhe and appointed his Head Chamberlain Heinrich von Blumenthal as its governor, with instructions to supervise extensive renovations and alterations such as the side wings between the three buildings. After his kingdom ceased to exist when France lost the Battle of the Nations on 19 October 1813, the Elector of Hesse-Kassel returned. When his state was annexed by Prussia in 1866 following the Austro-Prussian War, the palace passed from the House of Hesse to the House of Hohenzollern. After the Franco-Prussian War of 1870/71, the Prussian King offered the defeated Emperor Napoleon III accommodation there, but after half a year the Emperor went into exile in England.

From 1899 to 1918, Wilhelmshöhe was the summer residence of the German emperor Kaiser Wilhelm II. In 1918, after the armistice ended World War I, the Oberste Heeresleitung, the High Command of the Germany Army under Paul von Hindenburg was moved here from Spa (Belgium) to organize and lead the withdrawal and demobilization of the German troops. It remained at Wilhelmshöhe until February 1919, when it moved to Kolberg.

The middle tract of the castle was mostly destroyed by Allied bombing during World War II. The first reconstruction was made in 1968-1974 by the functionalist architect Paul Friedrich Posenenske. He completely reconstructed the exterior but changed the structure of the interior for its new function as an art museum. From 1994 to 2000 another renovation was made to bring it closer to the original structure. However, the dome of the castle was not rebuilt.

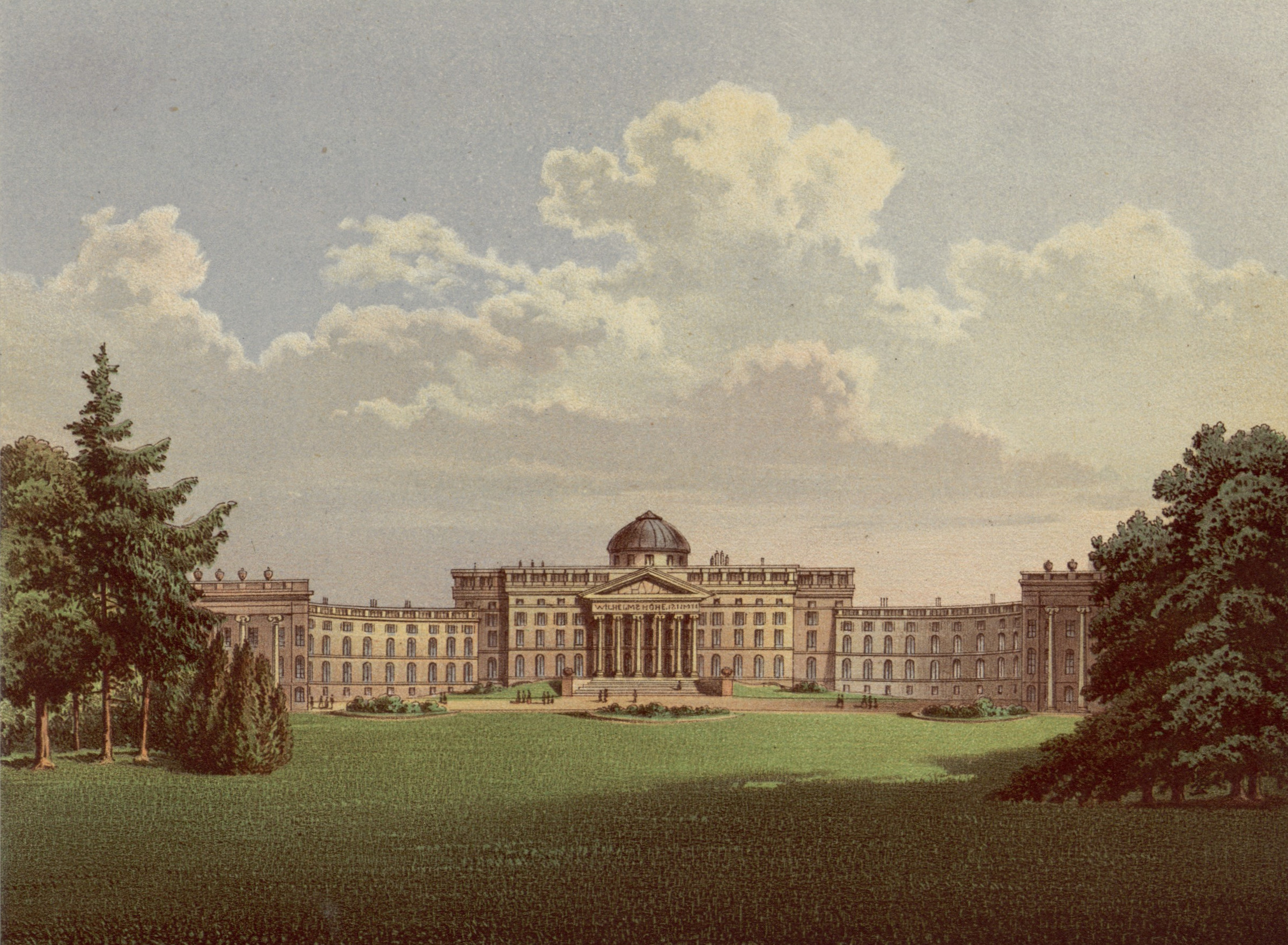
Wilhelmshöhe Palace in 1860

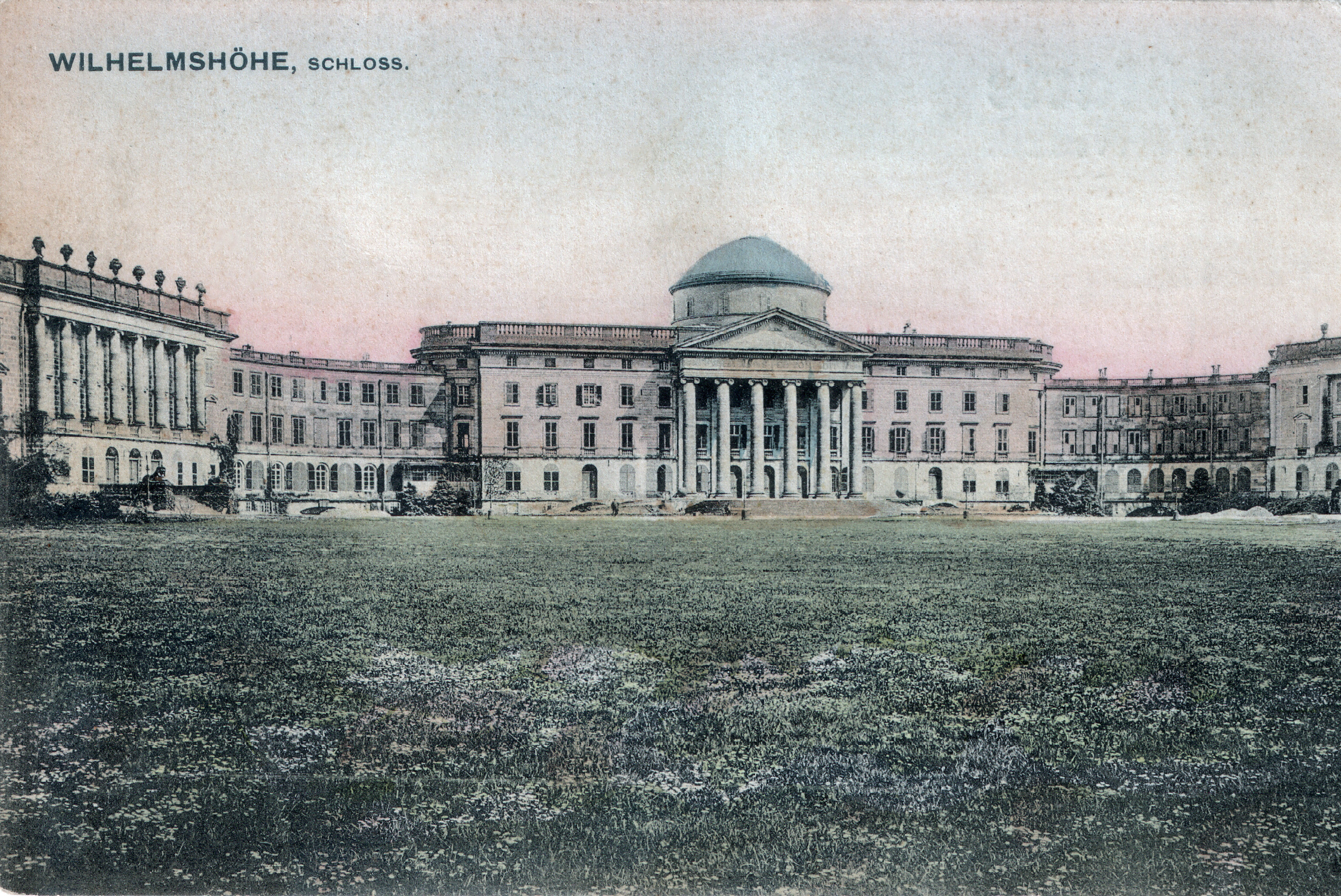
Wilhelmshöhe Palace in a 1907 postcard

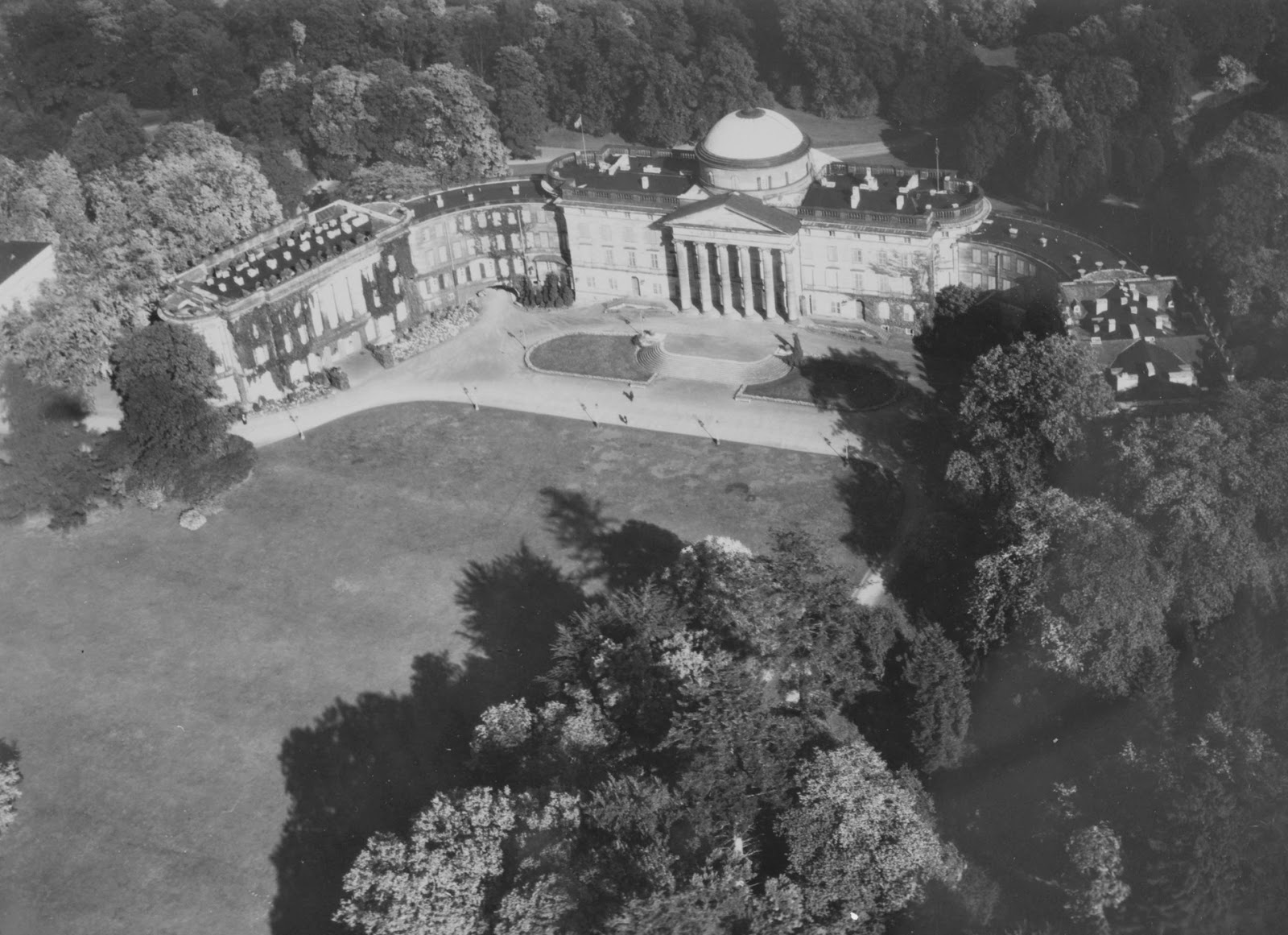
Wilhelmshöhe Palace before the war

== Today ==
Today the Wilhelmshöhe Castle Museum houses the antiquities collection, the Gallery of the Old Masters (which includes one of the world's largest Rembrandt collections) and the Graphic Arts Collection.

William I, Elector of Hesse, as well as Jérôme Bonaparte, assembled a large collection of Empire style furniture. Parts of it are on display in the museum, others on loan to Bellevue Palace in Berlin, the official residence of the President of Germany.
