= St Michael's Church, Hekelgem =

Roman Catholic parish church in Belgium

Church of St Michael
- Dutch: Sint-Michielskerk
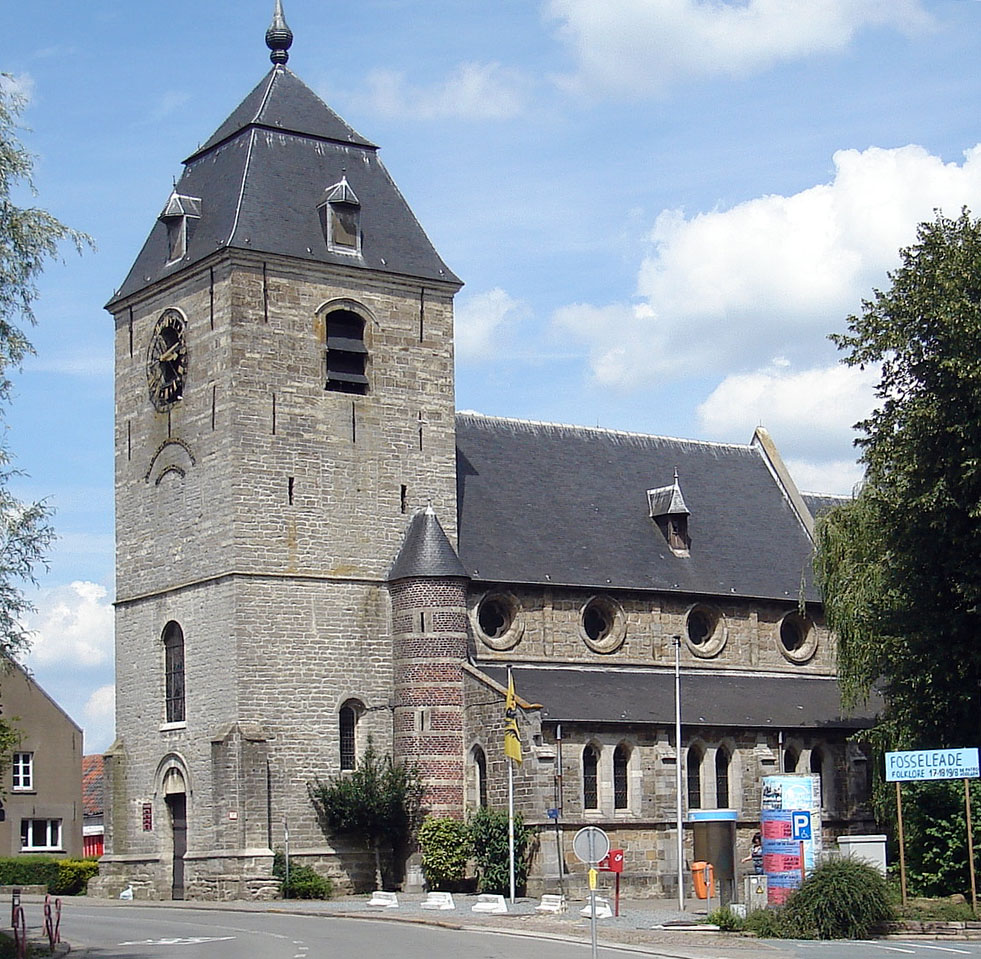
- Church of St Michael, Hekelgem
- Church of St Michael
- 50.9076°N 4.1090°E
- Location: Hekelgem (Affligem), Flemish Brabant
- Country: Belgium
- Denomination: Catholic

History
- Founder: Affligem Abbey
- Dedication: Archangel Michael
- Consecrated: before 1105

Architecture
- Functional status: parish church
- Heritage designation: protected built heritage
- Designated: 2021
- Style: Romanesque; Gothic; Neo-Gothic
- Years built: 12th-13th century; 18th century; 20th century

The Church of St Michael (Dutch: Sint-Michielskerk) in Hekelgem, Belgium, is a historic parish church that is listed as protected built heritage. The church was perhaps initially attached to the local lordship, but from 1105 to 1796 was a dependency of Affligem Abbey. It became the church of a distinct parish in the 13th century. In the 21st century the parish became part of "Pastoral zone Meander".

== Structure ==
The church tower has a 12th-century Romanesque base with an 18th-century top and spire. The nave was built in the 13th century in early Gothic style. The aisles and chancel were built in the early 20th century (1917–1919) in neo-Gothic style. Renovations were carried out in the 1970s, when a new tower clock was installed. The medieval parts of the building were listed as a protected monument in 1947; the rest of the church was designated as built heritage in 2021.

== Furnishings ==
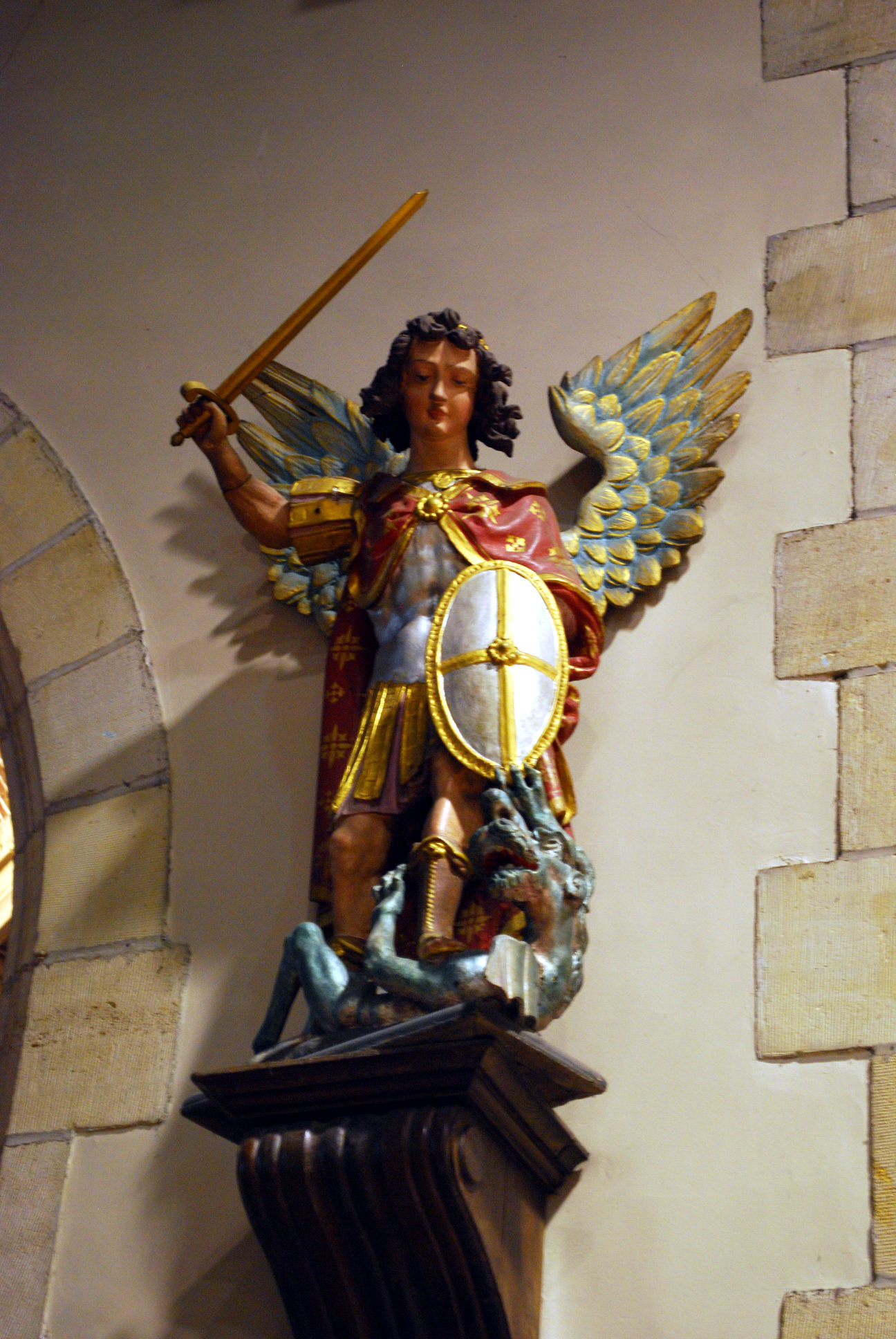
St Michael casting down Satan (17th-century)

The church contains a 15th-century baptismal font with an 18th-century copper cover, a 17th-century statue of St Michael, two 18th-century confessionals, and an elaborately carved 19th-century pulpit.
