= Mazenzele =

Coordinates: 50°57′N 4°10′E

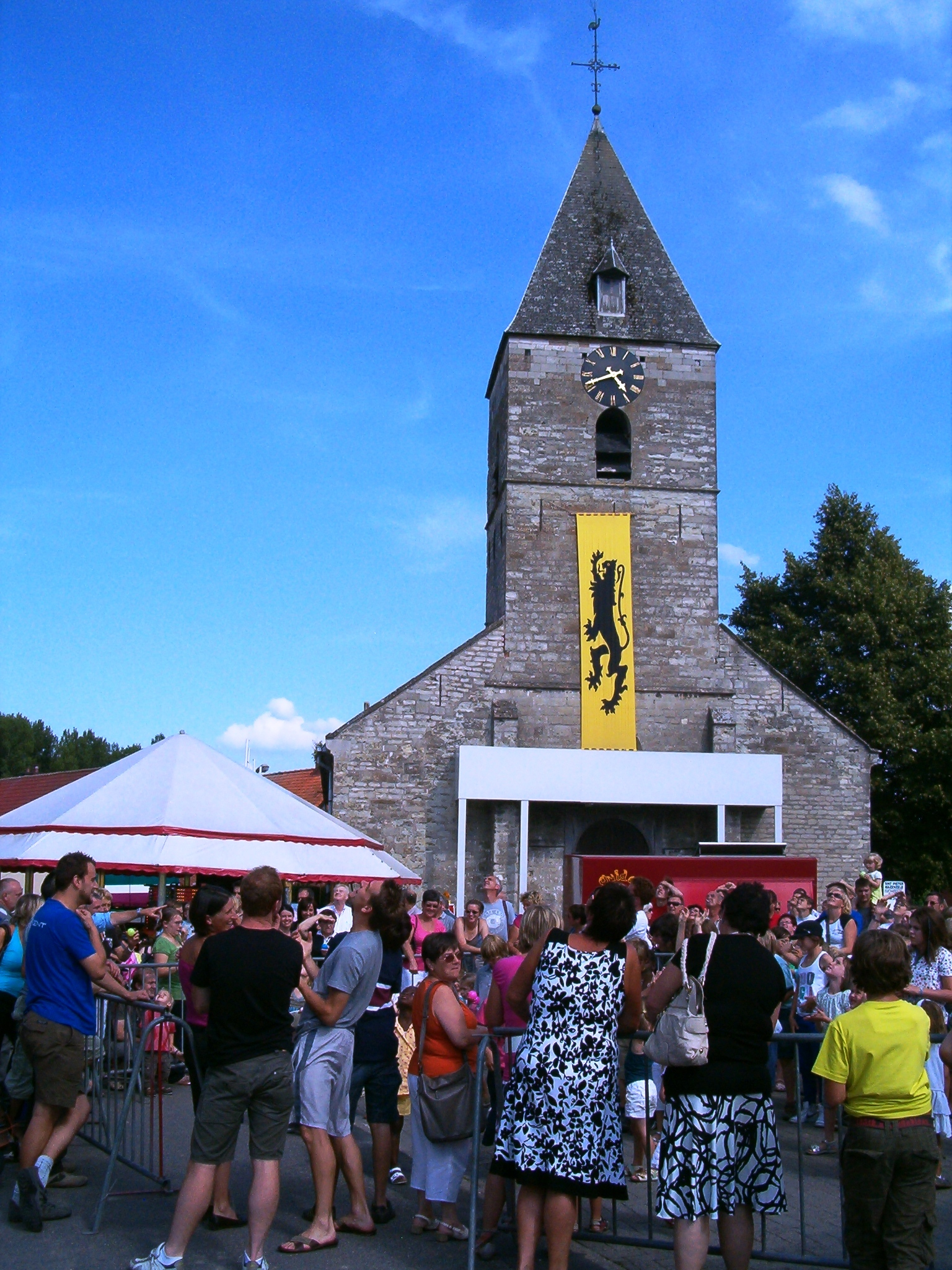
Mazenzele fair next to St. Peter's Church

Mazenzele is a Flemish village in the Belgian province Flemish Brabant and also a borough of Opwijk in the canton of Asse and the district Halle-Vilvoorde. Mazenzele is situated at 20 km from Brussels in the Pajottenland region. Mazenzele originated in the Frankish period as a settlement around an open village fallow.

Kravaalbos is an old forest which is situated partly in Mazenzele. The other parts of the forest are located in Asse (Asse-ter-Heide) and Aalst (Meldert). The forest is a remnant of the ancient Coal Forest, which also included the Sonian Forest and the Hallerbos. The forest became famous in the Middle Ages for the quarries that were exploited there from the 12th to the 16th centuries on the initiative of Affligem Abbey. The forest covers about 80 hectares and has an undulating relief with its highest point at 80 metres above sea level.

At the heart of the village is the centuries-old St. Peter's Church, built in Romanesque style. A bell from 1639 hangs in the tower. During World War I, the church was severely damaged by German troops.

A little further on, there is an open common square overgrown with trees. Here the archers hold their annual competition.
