= Affligem =

- Municipality
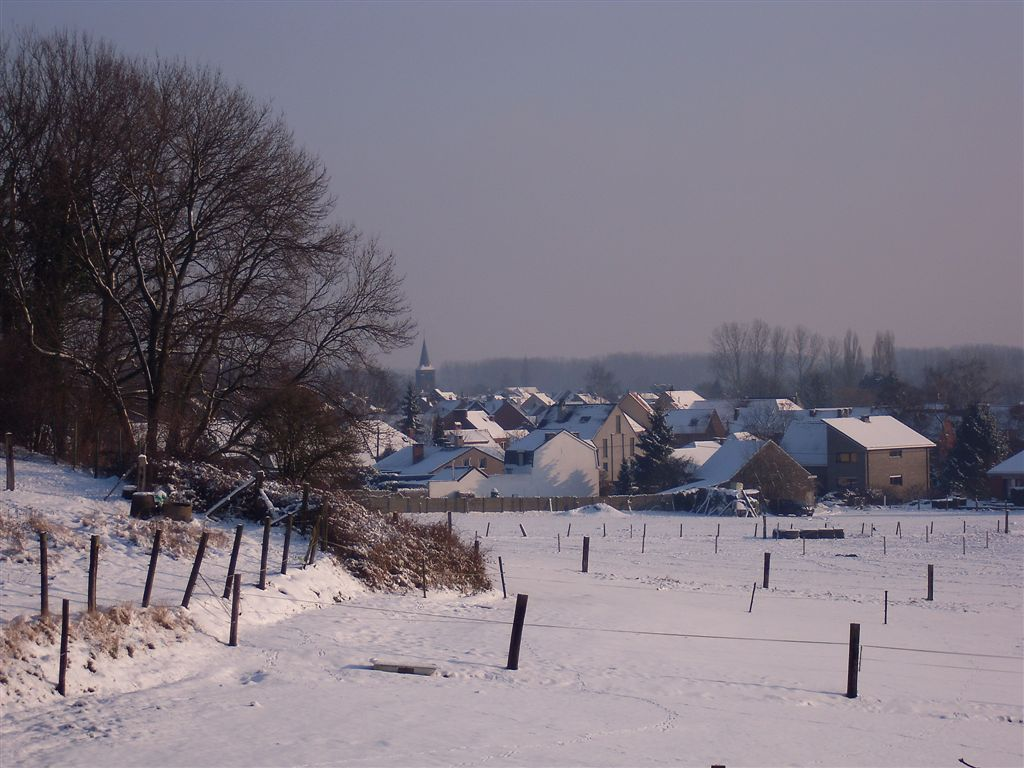

- Flag Coat of arms

- Affligem in the Province of Flemish Brabant
- Interactive map of Affligem
- Location in Belgium
- Coordinates: 50°54′N 04°06′E
- Country: Belgium
- Community: Flemish Community
- Region: Flemish Region
- Province: Flemish Brabant
- Arrondissement: Halle-Vilvoorde

Government
  - Mayor: Walter De Donder (CD&V)
  - Governing parties: Lijst Burgemeester (CD&V), Open2040

Area
  - Total: 17.92 km^{2} (6.92 sq mi)

Population (2018-01-01)
  - Total: 13,225
  - Density: 738.0/km^{2} (1,911/sq mi)
- Postal codes: 1790
- NIS code: 23105
- Area codes: 053 - 02
- Website: www.affligem.be

Affligem (Dutch pronunciation: [ˈɑfliɣɛm]; anciently written Afflighem) is a municipality located some 20 km (12 mi) west-north-west of Brussels in the Belgian province of Flemish Brabant, not far from the city of Aalst and the important railway junction of Denderleeuw. Affligem is situated in the Pajottenland.

The municipality comprises the villages of Essene, Hekelgem and Teralfene (note that there is no village called Affligem proper). On 1 January 2006 it had 11,956 inhabitants. The total area is 17.70 km^{2} (7 sq mi), giving a population density of 676 inhabitants per km^{2}.

== Monuments ==
Historically, the village is best known for the Benedictine Affligem Abbey, founded in 1062.

Other monuments include St Michael's church, Hekelgem.

== Affligem Abbey beers ==
Affligem Abbey was founded around 1074, making it one of the oldest breweries and businesses in Belgium. The label "anno 1074" on the Affligem beer bottles is based on the abbey's founding. The brand name is used under license from the monks of Affligem, by the Op-Ale brewery in the neighbouring village of Opwijk. The brewery is now owned by Heineken International, who have renamed it the Affligem brewery and market the beers internationally.

== External links and sources ==
- Media related to Affligem at Wikimedia Commons
- Affligem Municipality Official site (in Dutch)
