= Hekelgem =

Coordinates: 50°54′26″N 4°06′30″E

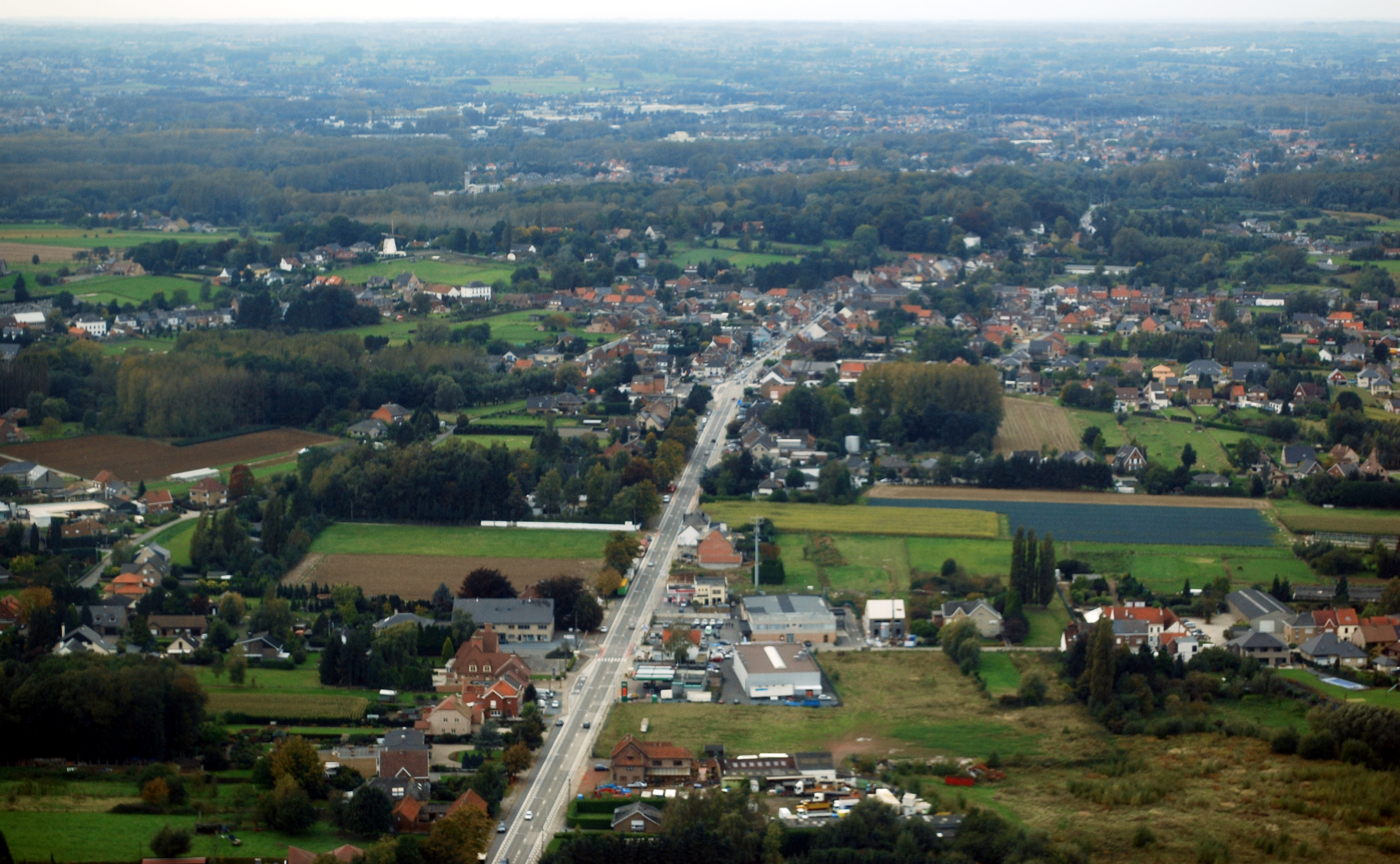
An aerial view of Hekelgem (2008)

Hekelgem is a village in the province Flemish Brabant, Belgium. In 1977 it merged with Essene and Teralfene to form the municipality of Affligem, of which it remains a section. The merged municipality is named after the historic Affligem Abbey in Hekelgem.

== History ==
The oldest mentions of Hekelgem are as Hecelengim (1105), Eclegen (1119) and Heclengem (1148). Historically it has often been referred to as Hekelghem.

The village was situated on the main road between Brussels and Ghent, and on the historical frontier between the Duchy of Brabant and the County of Flanders (now the provinces of Flemish Brabant and East Flanders).

In the later Middle Ages and through the Early Modern period the territory was partly subject to the lordship of Asse and partly to Affligem Abbey, with frequent disputes about their relative rights and privileges, particularly with regard to the woodland and heath surrounding the village. In the year 1295, John II, Duke of Brabant, recognised that the abbey by immemorial custom had the right to appoint a board of seven aldermen; the lords of Asse appointed a mayor, who was denied any authority within (and sometimes even physical access to) the monastery. The parish church, St Michael's church, was a dependency of the abbey: the monastery collected two-thirds of the tithes, leaving a third to support a curate.

In 1525 there were 125 hearths in the village, but by 1686 only 76 households. In the 1680s and 1690s, the village repeatedly suffered pillage and destruction during the French invasions of the Nine Years' War.

On 23 December 1792, in the aftermath of the French revolutionary army's victory in the Battle of Jemappes on 6 November, the men of the village assembled and declared that they wished to remain Catholic and continue to live as a free people under the institutions of the Duchy of Brabant, rather than accept French rule. Under French rule the village became a commune in the canton of Asse, as part of the Department of the Dyle. There were at the time four breweries and two gin distilleries in the village.

In 1846 the territory of the commune of Hekelgem was 809 hectares: 312 ha planted with cereal crops, 94 ha with industrial crops (such as flax and colza), 141 ha with beets and fodder, 81 ha of meadow, 5 ha of orchards, 7 ha of gardens, 46 ha of woodland, and 6 ha of heath and uncultivated land. The population was 2,021, in 375 households, of whom 513 were school-aged children and 276 on public relief.

== Folklore ==
- In the mid-19th century, on the Sunday following the Feast of Saints Peter and Paul (29 June), the unmarried young women of the village would draw straws to select a Rose Queen and a "Second Queen" to be crowned with roses.

== Monuments ==
- Affligem Abbey
- St Michael's church, Hekelgem
