= Beda Regaus =

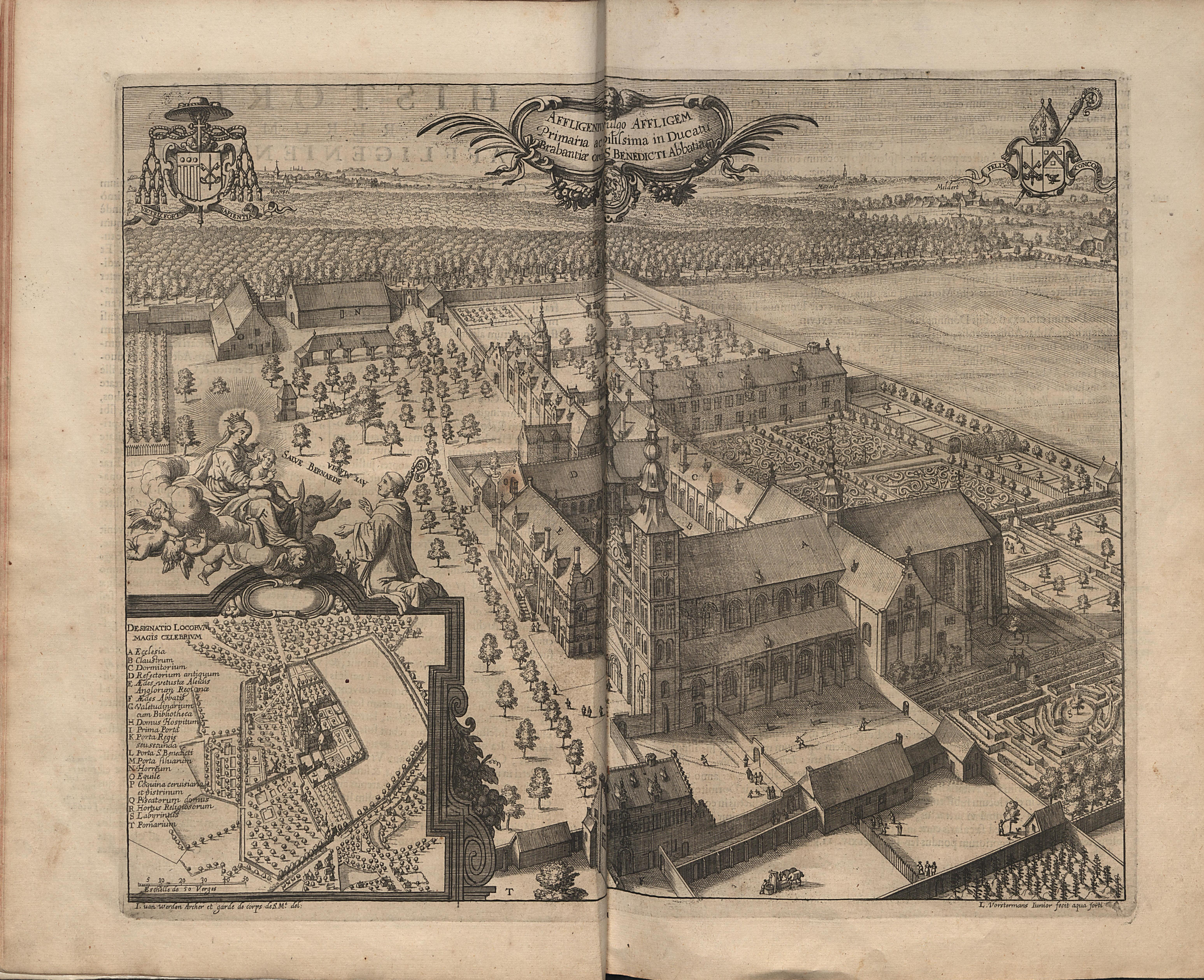
The Abbey of Affligem in the mid-17th century (image from Chorographia Sacra Brabantiae by Antonius Sanderus - 1659)

Beda Regaus (1718–1808) was the provost of Affligem Abbey during the disturbances of the French Revolutionary Wars. He was also active as a monastic historian, hymnwriter, and poet.

== Life ==
Baptised Martinus at the Church of St Nicholas in Brussels on 27 November 1718, Regaus studied at an Augustinian college in Brussels and briefly attended Leuven University before entering the Benedictine abbey of Affligem in 1739. He made his religious profession as a monk on 8 January 1741, taking the monastic name Beda. After serving as librarian, novice master, and sub-prior, he was in 1763 appointed provost of the abbey. In 1770 he commissioned Laurent-Benoît Dewez to renovate the monastic buildings in a neo-classical style.

French forces had invaded the Low Countries in 1792, and on 11 November 1796 French revolutionary soldiers forcefully closed and seized the abbey. For the next two years, Regaus was able to maintain a precarious community life outside the monastery. He continued to regard himself as the provost of a scattered community until his death at Hekelgem on 11 April 1808.

== Works ==
- Liber Communis Zelatoris (1745)
- Directorium ad usum RR.PP. Hafflighemensium (1763)
- Hafflighemum Illustratum (1766–1778)
- Stellarium Marianum (1784)
- Directorium Abbatiae Afflighemensis (1786)
- Bona et Jura Monasterii Hafflighemensis (1790)
- Regula Evangelica Christianorum (1793)
- Liber Amoris (1800).
