= Benedictus van Haeften =

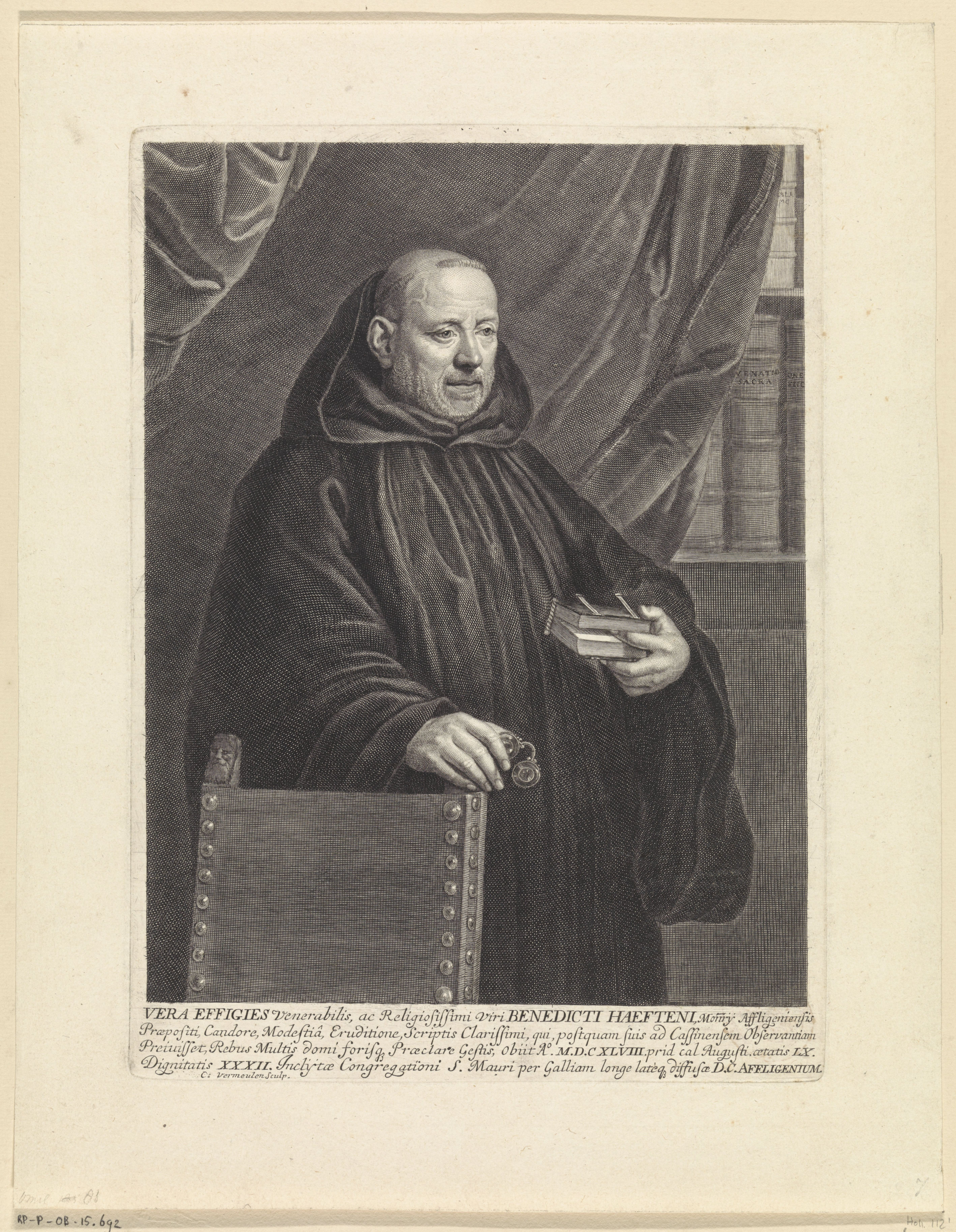
Benedictus van Haeften

Benedictus van Haeften (1588 – 31 July 1648) was the Provost of Affligem Abbey and a writer of religious works.

Haeften commissioned Rubens and De Crayer to decorate the church and the monastery in Affligem.

== Biography ==
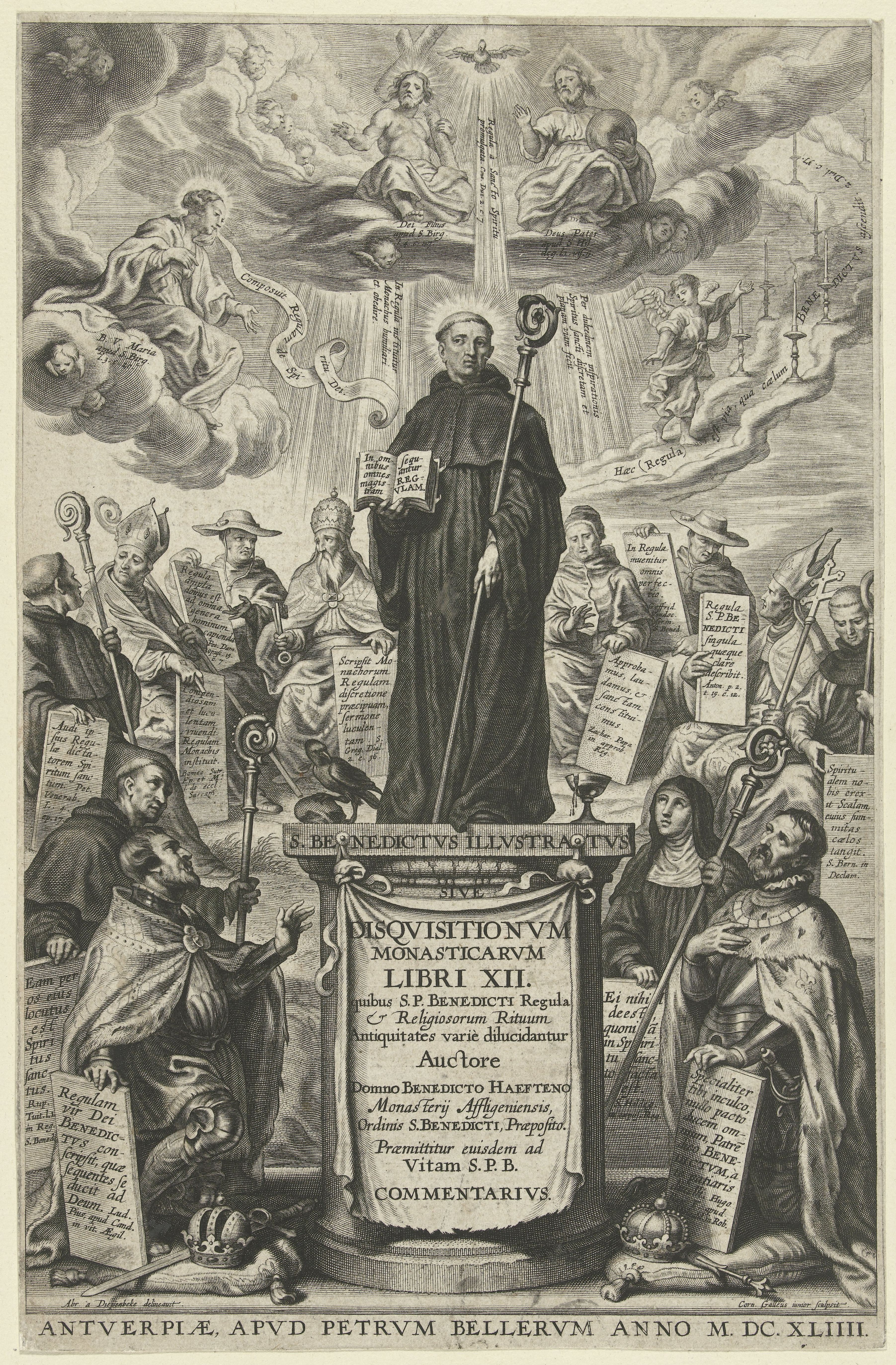
Benedictus van Haeften, S. Benedictvs illvstratvs sive Disqvisitionvm monasticarvm libri XII. Antwerpen, P. Bellerus, 1644.

Van Haeften was a Benedictine writer, provost of the Abbey of Affligem. He was born in Utrecht, 1588, and died 31 July 1648, at Spa, Belgium, where he had gone to recover his health.

After studying philosophy and theology at the Catholic University of Leuven, he entered the Benedictine Abbey of Affligem in 1609, took solemn vows on 14 May 1611, and was ordained priest in 1613. He then returned to Leuven to continue his theological studies, but was recalled to his monastery when he was about to receive the licentiate in theology.

In 1616 he became prior, and in 1618 Matthias Hovius, Archbishop of Mechelen, who was at the same time Abbot of Affligem, appointed him provost of his monastery. Affligem at the time belonged to the Bursfeld Union, and under the prudent direction of van Haeften was in a flourishing condition.

Jacob Boonen, who had succeeded Hovius as archbishop and abbot in 1620, desired to join the monastery to the new Congregation of St. Vannes, in Lorraine, which had a stricter constitution than Bursfeld. After some hesitation, van Haeften agreed to the change, and on 18 October 1627, began his novitiate under the direction of a monk of the Congregation of Lorraine. Together with eight of his monks, he made confession according to the new reform on 25 October 1628, and founded the Belgian Congregation of the Presentation of the Blessed Virgin. The new reform enjoined perpetual abstinence, daily rising at two o'clock in the morning, and manual labour joined with study. The new congregation was of short duration. Archbishop of Mechelen brought about its dissolution in 1654.

Van Haeften is the author of monastic research in the Rule of Saint Benedict.

Professor Carme López Calderón suggests that the engravings in Van Haeften's Schola cordis were used as a reference in the decoration of the "Chapel of Nuestra Señora de los Ojos Grandes" in Lugo Cathedral. Those in Regia via Crucis found their way into French emblem books of the seventeenth century.

== Works ==
- van Haeften, Benedictus (1635), Regia via Crucis (Holy Cross)
- van Haeften, Benedictus (1640), Schola cordis (School of the Heart)
- van Haeften, Benedictus (1644), Disquisitiones Monasticae (Monastic Disquisitions)

== Sources ==
- van Haeften, Benedictus (1823), The school of the heart (1823 ed.) adapted from Latin Schola cordis below
- van Haeften, Benedictus (1635), Schola Cordis (Monasterio Affligeniensis ed.) Latin original in four books subdivided in classes of multiple readings
- van Haeften, Benedictus (1629), Herzen Schuel, Regia Via Crucis, Le chemin royal de la croix, Camino real de la cruz (Internet archive ed.) historical facsimiles of other works held by private/public libraries in various languages
- Herbermann, Charles, ed. (1913). "Benedict van Haeften" . Catholic Encyclopedia. New York: Robert Appleton Company.
