= Essene, Belgium =

Village in Belgium

Coordinates: 50°53′49″N 4°08′20″E

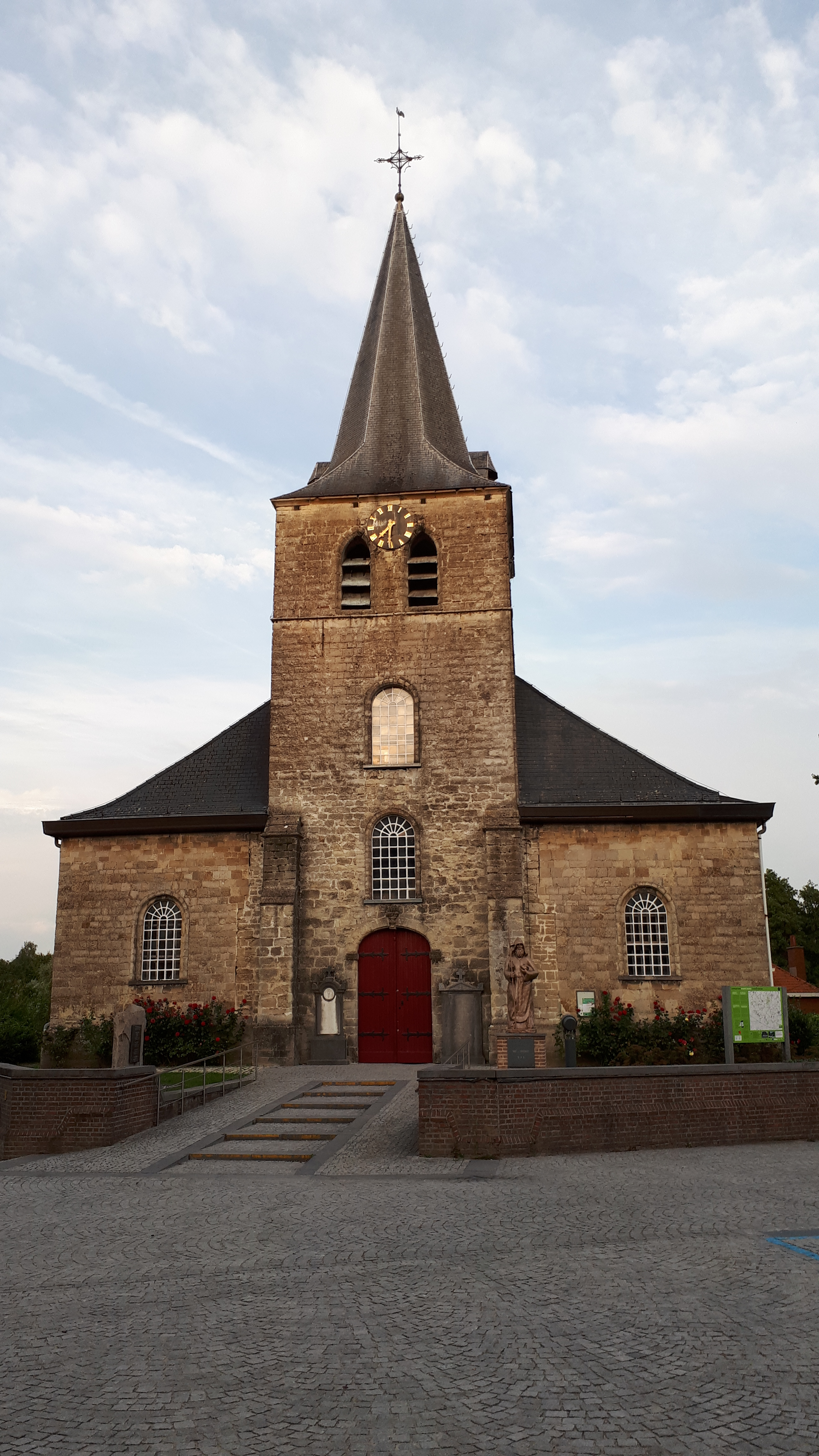
Onze-Lieve-Vrouw-Bezoekingkerk in Essene

Essene is a submunicipality of Affligem in the Belgian province of Flemish Brabant. It was an independent municipality until the municipal reorganization of 1977. It is part of the Arrondissement of Halle-Vilvoorde and the Asse canton.

Essene has several architectural heritage buildings, including several chapels, multiple farms, a brewery and a country house.

Essene was before the French period written as Esschene. After the French period Essene was incorporated into the Asse canton of the Dyle department.
