= Teralfene =

- Municipality
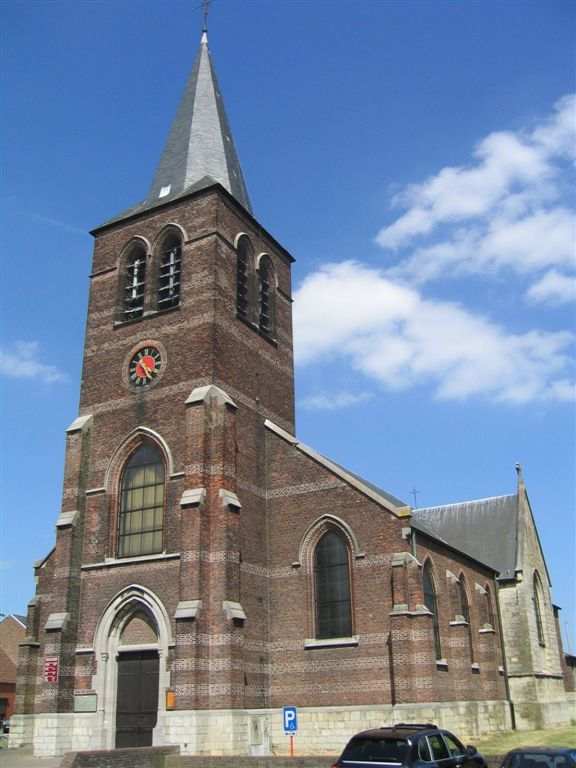
- Sint-Jan Evangelist Church, Teralfene
- Interactive map of Teralfene
- Location in Belgium
- Coordinates: 50°53′34″N 4°5′56″E
- Country: Belgium
- Community: Flemish Community
- Region: Flemish Region
- Province: Flemish Brabant

Area
  - Total: 17.92 km^{2} (6.92 sq mi)
- Postal codes: 1790
- NIS code: 23105

Teralfene is a village in the municipality of Affligem, Belgium. It has an area of 244 ha (602.94 acres). The other communities in Affligem are Hekelgem and Essene.

== Name ==
The name "Teralfene" originates from the brook Alfene (now called the Bellebeek) which flows into the Dender. The oldest reference to the village is Iuxta Alfnam (circa 1142).

== History ==
During the post-Carolingian period, Teralfene belonged to the shire of Brabant. From 1056 it was part of a fief of the Holy Roman Empire that was granted to the counts of Flanders (known as Imperial Flanders). During the French period (1796-1815) Teralfene was part of the Department of the Dyle. During the Dutch period (1815-1830) this department was transformed into the province South Brabant by William I of the Netherlands.

== Politics ==
=== List of mayors ===
This list contains the known mayors of Teralfene until the merger into Affligem.

- 1797: Joannes Van Nieuwenhove (agent municipal)
- 1798: Jean Baptiste Vaerman (agent municipal)
- 1799: Jean Verhaevert (agent municipal)
- 1800-1803: Mathias Gruber (acting mayor, from Asse)
- 1804-1808: Adrien Joseph De Bisschop
- 1809-1811: Jean Baptiste Vaerman
- 1812-1829: Jan Baptiste Van Nieuwenhove
- 1830-1835: Adriaan Frans Asselman
- 1836-1860: Ferdinand Van Den Plas
- 1861-1898: Nicolaas Van Den Plas
- 1899- : Egied Bosteels
- 1900-1911: Josephus Bernardus Van Nieuwenborgh
- 1912-1920: Jean Baptiste Callebaut
- 1921-1938: Alfons Van Vaerenbergh
- 1939-1940: Eugeen Bosteels
- 1941-1944: Alfons De Bisschop
- 1944-1946: Eugeen Bosteels
- 1947-1952: Jozef Van Vaerenbergh
- 1953-1970: Edmond Geeraerts
- 1971-1976: Frans Van Den Borre

=== Political parties ===
Before Teralfene became part of Affligem, two political parties were prominent at the local level: the Dries and the Daal-party, each named after an area of the village. Both parties originated from a disagreement over an inheritance, and divided Teralfene since 1850. The Daal and Dries parties had about equal power, and election victories switched constantly for over 100 years.

After the merger into Affligem, other parties (CVP, SP, VU and PVV) gained popularity, and the Daal and Dries parties dissolved.

== Demographics ==
=== 19th century ===
Year	1806	1816	1830	1846	1856	1866	1876	1880	1890
Population	697	737	903	1.062	1.135	1.231	1.337	1.420	1.494

=== 20th century until 1976 (year of merger into Affligem) ===
Year	1900	1910	1920	1930	1947	1961	1970	1976
Population	1.714	1.983	2.063	2.344	2.618	3.138	3.363	3.540

== See also ==
- Affligem
- Belgium
