= Affligem Abbey =

Abbey in Affligem, Belgium

Coordinates: 50.9242°N 4.114°E

- Abdij Affligem (Dutch)
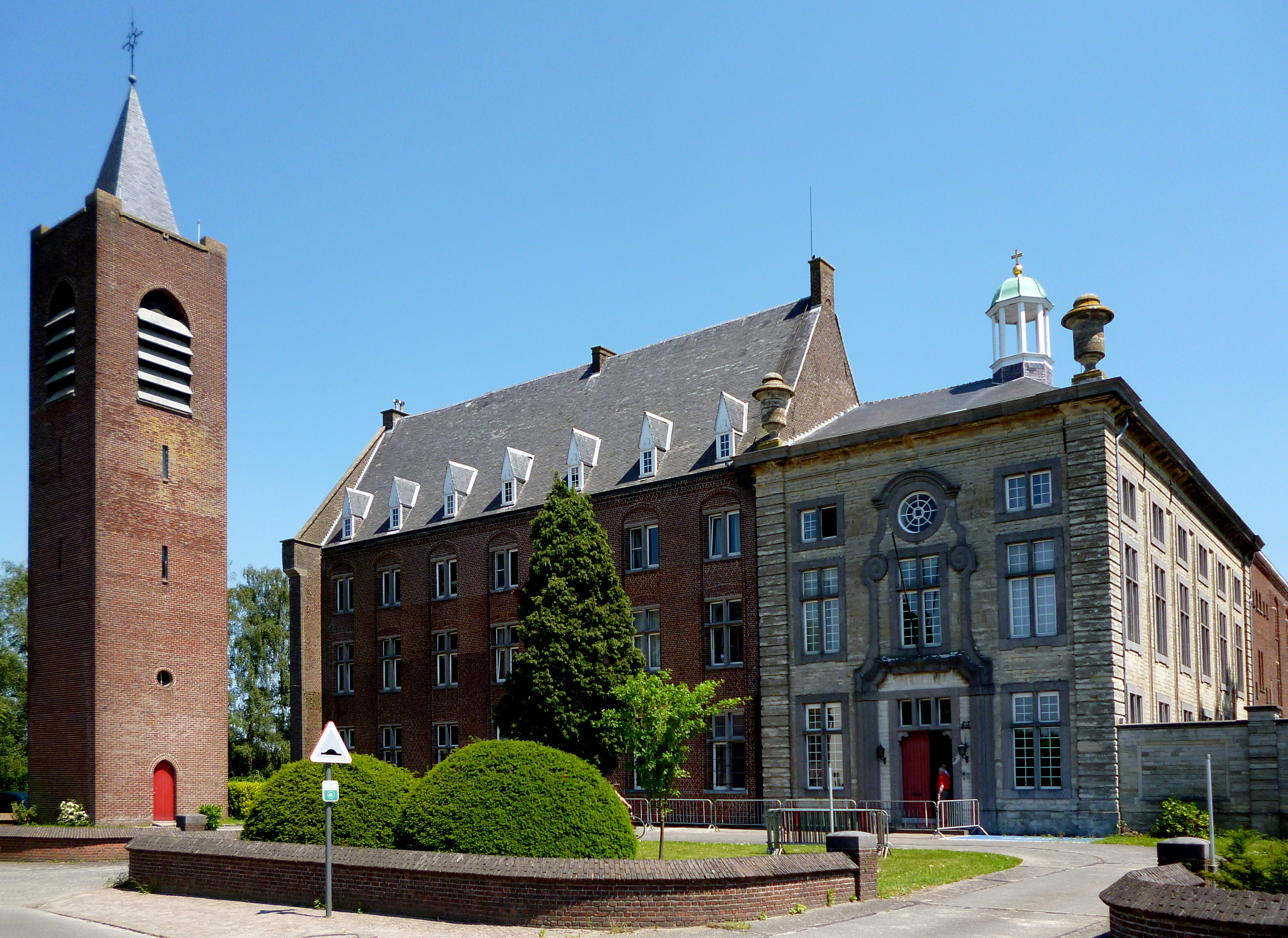
- The Abbey of Affligem
- Interactive map of the Affligem Abbey area

General information
- Type: Abbey
- Location: Affligem, Flemish Brabant, Belgium
- Construction started: 1086

Affligem Abbey (Dutch: Abdij Affligem, French: Abbaye d'Affligem) is a Benedictine abbey in the historic village of Hekelgem, now in the municipality of Affligem, Flemish Brabant, Belgium, 19 km (12 mi) to the north-west of Brussels. Dedicated in 1086, it was the most important monastery in the Duchy of Brabant and therefore often called Primaria Brabantiae.

== History ==
=== First foundation ===
On 28 June 1062, an hermitical fraternity was founded in Affligem by six knights who repented of their violent way of life. Hermann II, Count Palatine of Lotharingia (1061–1085) and his guardian, Anno II, archbishop of Cologne (d. 1075) donated the foundation grounds. On this land, the first abbey church, dedicated to Saint Peter, was erected in 1083. The Benedictine Rule was adopted in 1085, followed by the formal dedication of the abbey in 1086.

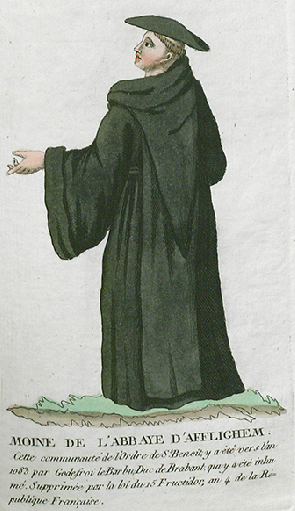
Monk of Affligem Abbey

The first abbot of the abbey was Fulgentius (1088–1122), a monk of Saint-Vanne Abbey in Verdun, originally from Frasnes, in Walloon Brabant. John Cotton, whose De musica (c. 1100-1121) is one of the earliest musical theses, is also referred to as ' Johannes Affligemensis' because he dedicated De musica to abbot Fulgentius.

The counts of Brabant, also counts of Leuven, became their protectors (Vögte) in 1085/1086. A number of their family members are buried in the abbey church, including Queen Adeliza of England (d. 1151), as well as her father Duke Godfrey I of Leuven (d. 1139). Queen Adeliza was buried in the abbey church in 1151, near the clockwork. (Note: According the Affligem necrology, Adeliza was buried in the abbey church, near the clockwork. A donation made by her brother Joscelin to Reading Abbey seems to suggest she was buried there with Henry I.)

During the 12th century, the abbey became known for the strict adoption of the Cluniac observance. Several monasteries were founded by the monks of Affligem or assigned to the abbot of Affligem by their founder. Maria Laach Abbey in the Rhineland-Palatinate in Germany, was founded in 1093 as a priory of Affligem by the first Count Palatine of the Rhine Heinrich II von Laach and his wife Adelaide of Weimar-Orlamünde, widow of Hermann II of Lotharingia. Bernard of Clairvaux visited Affligem in 1146, where it is said his greeting to the Blessed Virgin was miraculously answered. In memory of this event, he donated his staff and chalice to the abbey (still preserved in the abbey).

In 1523, Affligem joined the Bursfelde Congregation, a union of Benedictine monasteries formed in the 15th century for the stricter observance of the Benedictine rule. In 1569, the Archbishop of Mechelen became secular abbot and the spiritual duty was exercised by a provost (praepositus), a measure that lasted until the dissolution of the abbey in 1796. In 1580 the abbey was destroyed by soldiers of William the Silent, but subsequently rebuilt.

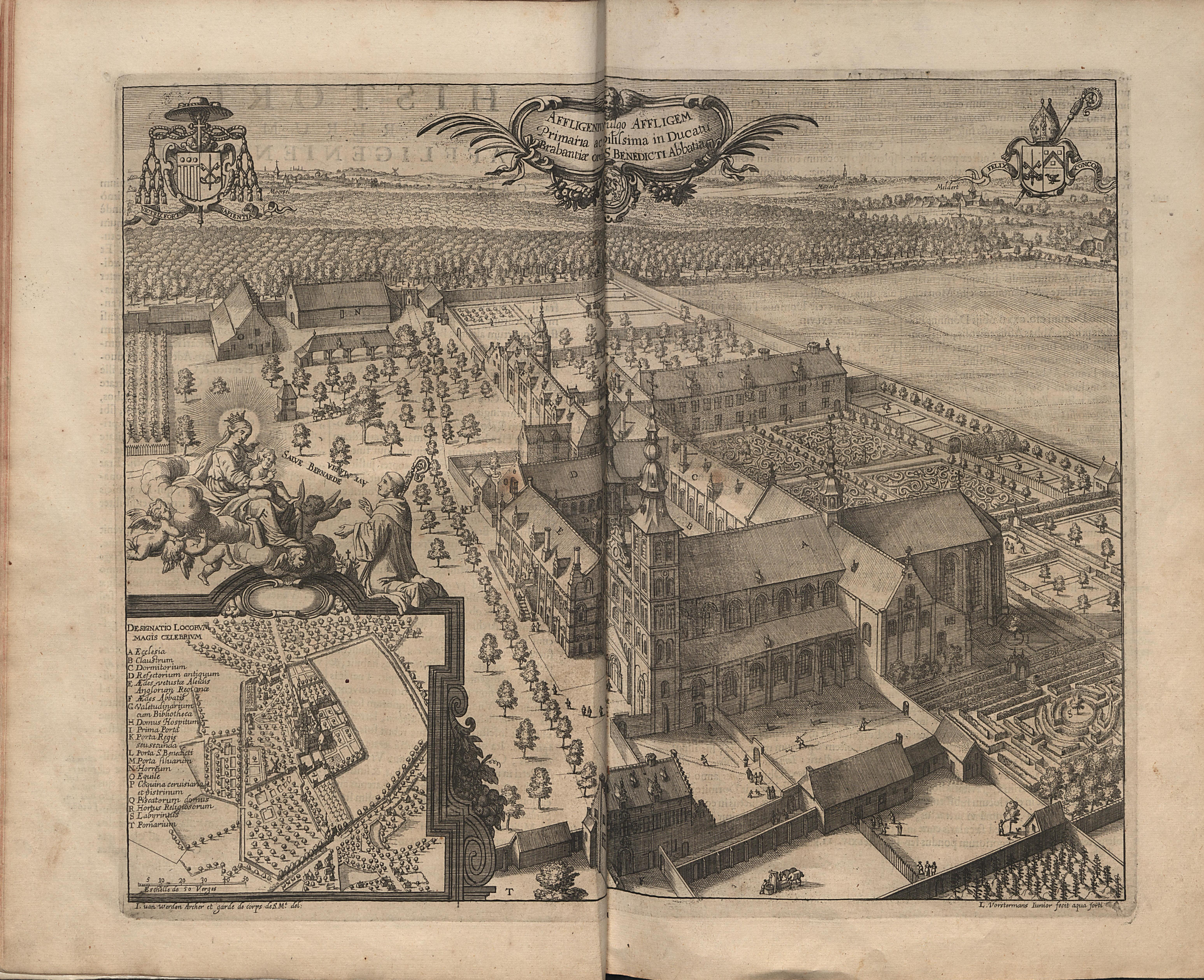
Affligem Abbey in the mid-17th century, depicted in Chorographia Sacra Brabantiae (Sanderus, 1659)

Archbishop Jacobus Boonen introduced the Monte Cassino observance. At his insistence, the Prior of Affligem, Benedict van Haeften, founded in 1627 a new congregation, B. M. V. in Templo Praesentata, which included Affligem and several other Belgian monasteries, affiliated to the Congregation of St. Vanne, which had a stricter constitution than Bursfeld. It was dissolved in 1654. Haeften commissioned Rubens and De Crayer to decorate the church and the monastery in Affligem.

In 1796, during the French occupation, the monks were chased away from the abbey, part of the buildings destroyed and the lands confiscated. The last provost, Beda Regaus, preserved the miraculous image of Our Lady, as well as the staff and chalice of Saint Bernard. These came into the possession of a Benedictine monk, Veremund Daens, who in 1838 established a new foundation at Dendermonde.

=== Second foundation ===
In 1869/70, Affligem Abbey was re-established and agricultural activity resumed. A new church was erected in 1880. The brewery was re-opened in 1885, followed by a new dairy and cheese farm in the mid-1890s. During World War I, copper fittings and fixtures were requisitioned, but the brewery resumed operation in 1921. The brewery was destroyed in World War II. The brand name is used under license from the monks of Affligem, by the Op-Ale brewery in the neighbouring village of Opwijk, now owned by Heineken and renamed Affligem Brewery.

Affligem Abbey is a member of the Flemish Province of the Subiaco Cassinese Congregation within the Benedictine Confederation.

== Building history ==
During its nine hundred years of existence, the abbey church did not escape war. Located on the border with the county of Flanders, it was in the 14th century destroyed twice by troops of the county of Flanders (War of the Brabantian Succession). In the process, the Romanesque basilical church lost three of its original five towers. In 1580, the abbey was set on fire by the troops of William the Silent.

The monastery experienced a new flowering under provost Benedictus van Haeften († 1648). To embellish the restored building, he called on the famous painters Peter Paul Rubens and Gaspar de Crayer. For the abbey church, prominent Antwerp sculptor Joannes Cardon created the choir stalls. In the late 17th century, the abbey was ravaged once again, this time by the armies of Louis XIV.

The complex revived in the 18th century thanks to the monumental classicist structures of the famous architect Laurent-Benoît Dewez. In 1768, his plans were approved for the renovation of the convent buildings, grouped around two square courtyards, with integration of the modified west facade of the church as the central element for a long, symmetrically extended façade composition with two risalites under triangular pediments. The foundation stone of the new structure was laid in 1770 and three monastery buildings were sacrificed for the new construction.

== Abbots ==
The first abbot of the abbey was Fulgentius (1088–1122), a monk of Saint-Vanne Abbey in Verdun. Among his prominent successors may be mentioned:

- Franco (1122–1135), author of De Gratia Dei in twelve books (Patrologia Latina, vol. 166, 717-080);
- Albert, whose devotion to the Virgin Mary won him the title Abbas Marianus;
- William de Croÿ (bishop) (1518–1521)
- Charles de Croÿ (1521–1564)

== Provosts ==
- Benedictus van Haeften, author of several religious works
- Beda Regaus, historian

== Burials ==
- Godfrey I of Leuven
- Adeliza of Leuven, Queen of England
- Marie of France, Duchess of Brabant
