= Opwijk =

- Municipality
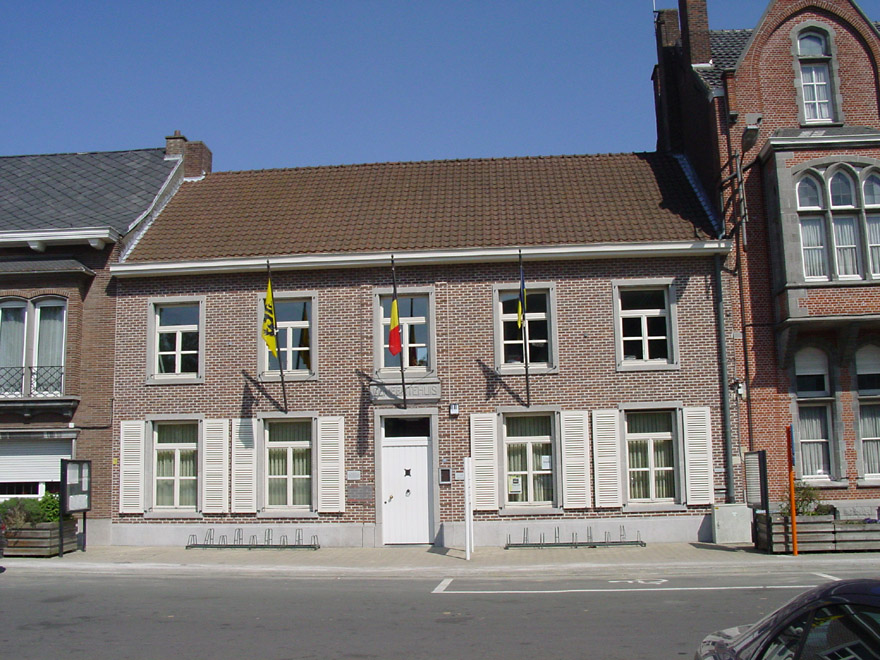
- Town hall of Opwijk, building 1

- Flag Coat of arms

- Location of Opwijk in Flemish Brabant
- Interactive map of Opwijk
- Location in Belgium
- Coordinates: 50°58′N 04°11′E
- Country: Belgium
- Community: Flemish Community
- Region: Flemish Region
- Province: Flemish Brabant
- Arrondissement: Halle-Vilvoorde

Government
  - Mayor: Inez De Coninck (N-VA)
  - Governing parties: Open VLD, N-VA

Area
  - Total: 19.92 km^{2} (7.69 sq mi)

Population (2018-01-01)
  - Total: 14,378
  - Density: 721.8/km^{2} (1,869/sq mi)
- Postal codes: 1745
- NIS code: 23060
- Area codes: 052, 02
- Website: www.opwijk.be

Opwijk (Dutch pronunciation: [ˈɔpʋɛik]) is a municipality located in the Belgian province of Flemish Brabant. The municipality comprises the towns of Mazenzele and Opwijk proper. On January 1, 2012, Opwijk had a total population of 13,990. The total area is 19.69 km^{2} which gives a population density of 690 inhabitants per km^{2}.

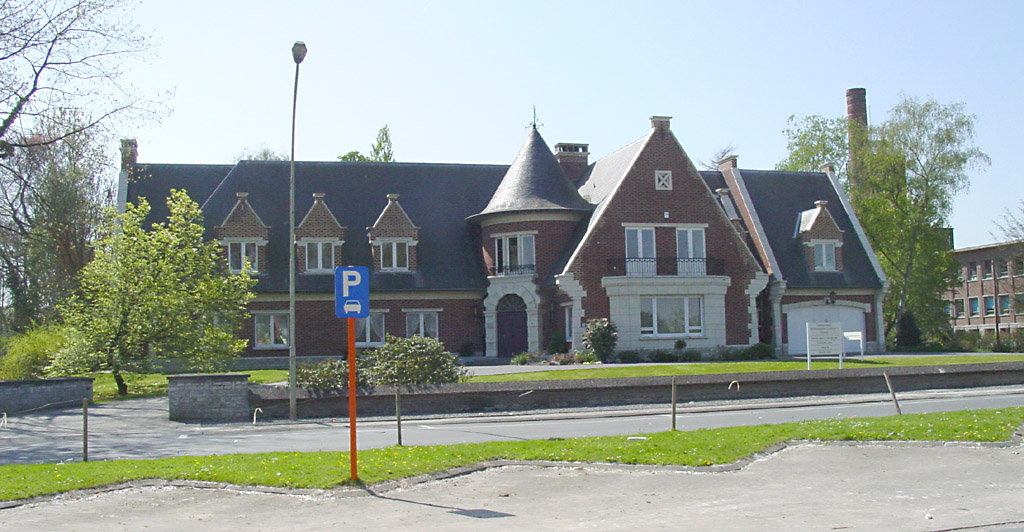
The town hall of Opwijk, building 2

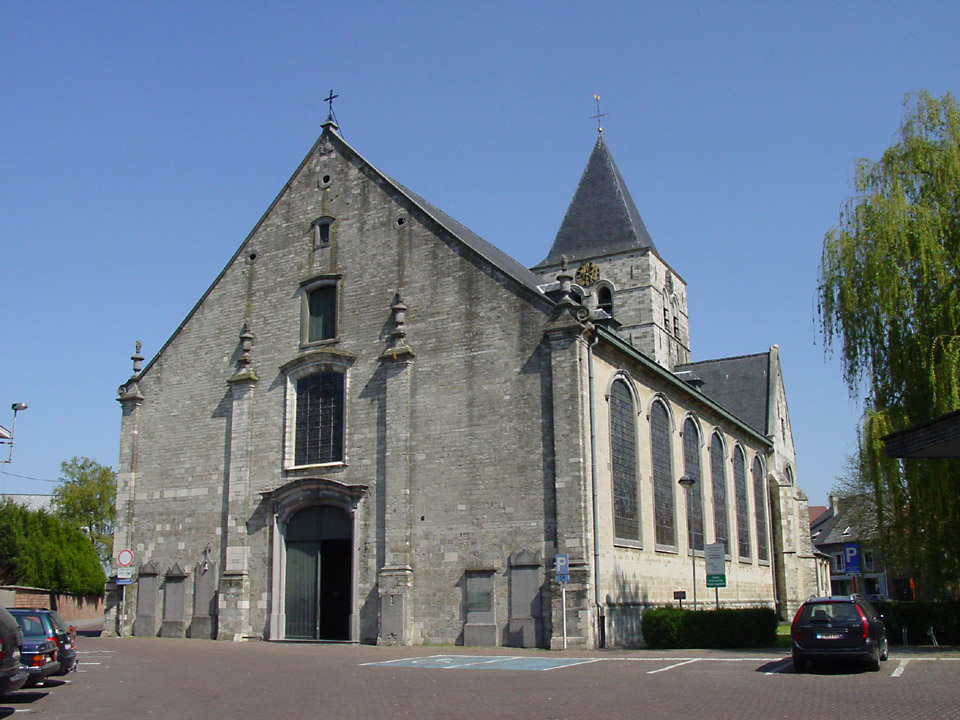
The church of Saint-Paul in the centre of Opwijk

== Places of interest ==
=== Built heritage ===
- The church of Saint-Paul
- The monastery of the sisters of Saint-Vincentius a Pauo

=== Places of commemoration ===
- At the cemetery, against a red beech, a monument commemorates the fallen soldiers of World War I. Besides a lot of veterans are buried here.

=== Other heritage ===
- The garden of the notary house of Wijnants. Today the garden is part of a school. Only a few trees are left over, such as a beautiful weeping beech (fagus sylvatica Pendula).
- The garden of 'Temmershof'. In 2007 most of the park was destroyed, except a few trees such as a big horse chestnut (aesculus hippocastanum).

== Parks ==
- The central park 'Hof ten Hemelrijk' or in English 'court of heaven' with lawn, a pond and trees. In 2018 a lime tree was planted as a peace tree for the commemoration of the end of World War I.
- The small 'Processiepark'. In this parks there is a tree circle of red beeches with two trees that fused together in a special way.
