= Liège Cathedral =

- St. Paul's Cathedral
- Cathédrale Saint-Paul de Liège
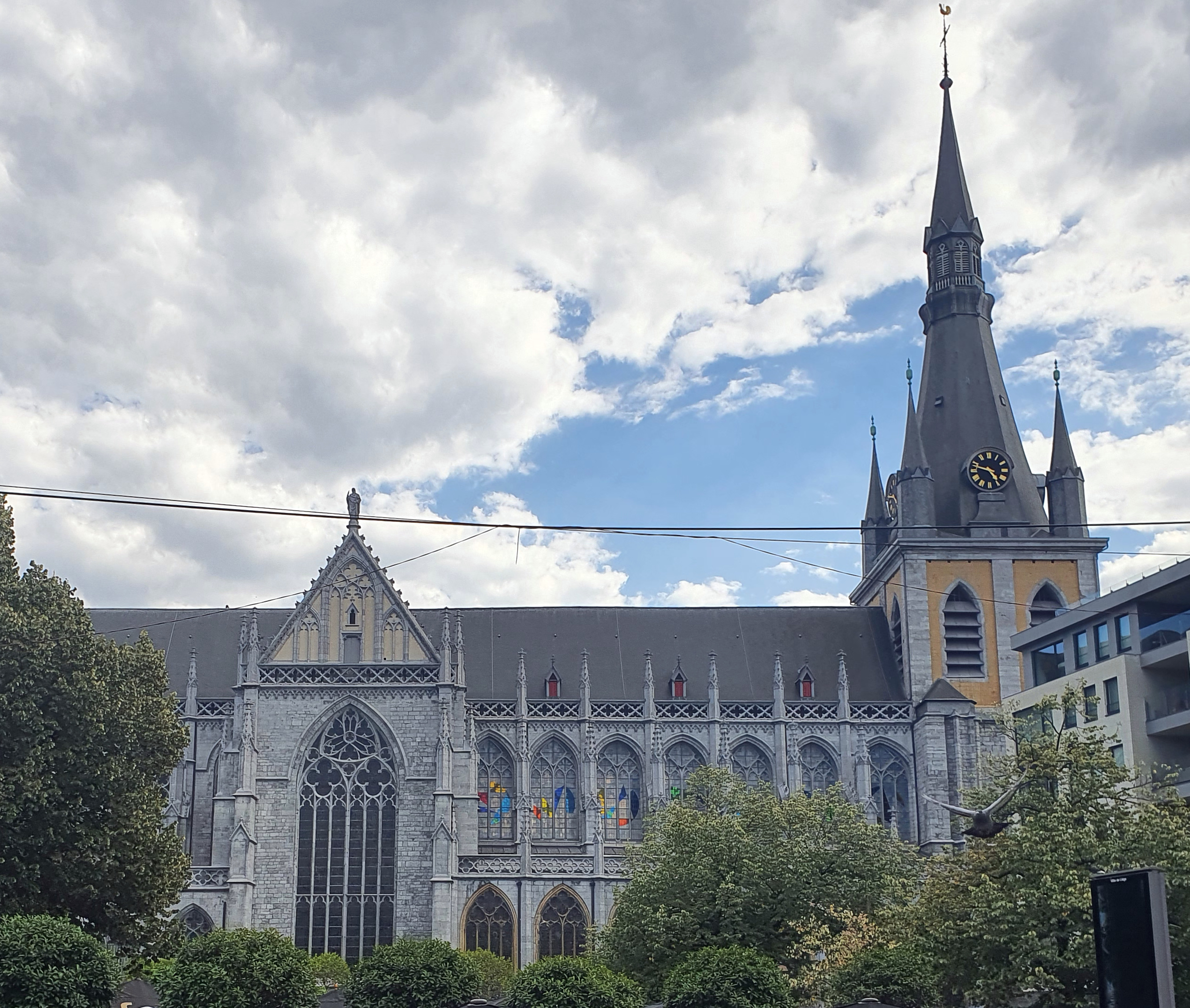
- Exterior
- Liège Cathedral
- 50.6403°N 5.5718°E
- Location: Liège
- Country: Belgium
- Denomination: Catholic

History
- Status: Cathedral

Architecture
- Functional status: Active
- Style: French Gothic
- Years built: 13th, 14th and 18th centuries

Administration
- Diocese: Diocese of Liège

Liège Cathedral, otherwise St. Paul's Cathedral (French: Cathédrale Saint-Paul), is a Roman Catholic cathedral in Liège, Belgium. Founded in the 10th century, it was rebuilt from the 13th to the 15th century and restored in the mid-19th century. It became a Catholic cathedral in the 19th century due to the destruction of Saint Lambert's Cathedral in 1795. It is the seat of the Diocese of Liège.

== St. Paul's Cathedral ==
During the French Revolution the ancient cathedral of Liège, St. Lambert's, was destroyed. After the revolution the former collegiate church of St. Paul's was elevated in rank, becoming the current Liège Cathedral.

== History ==
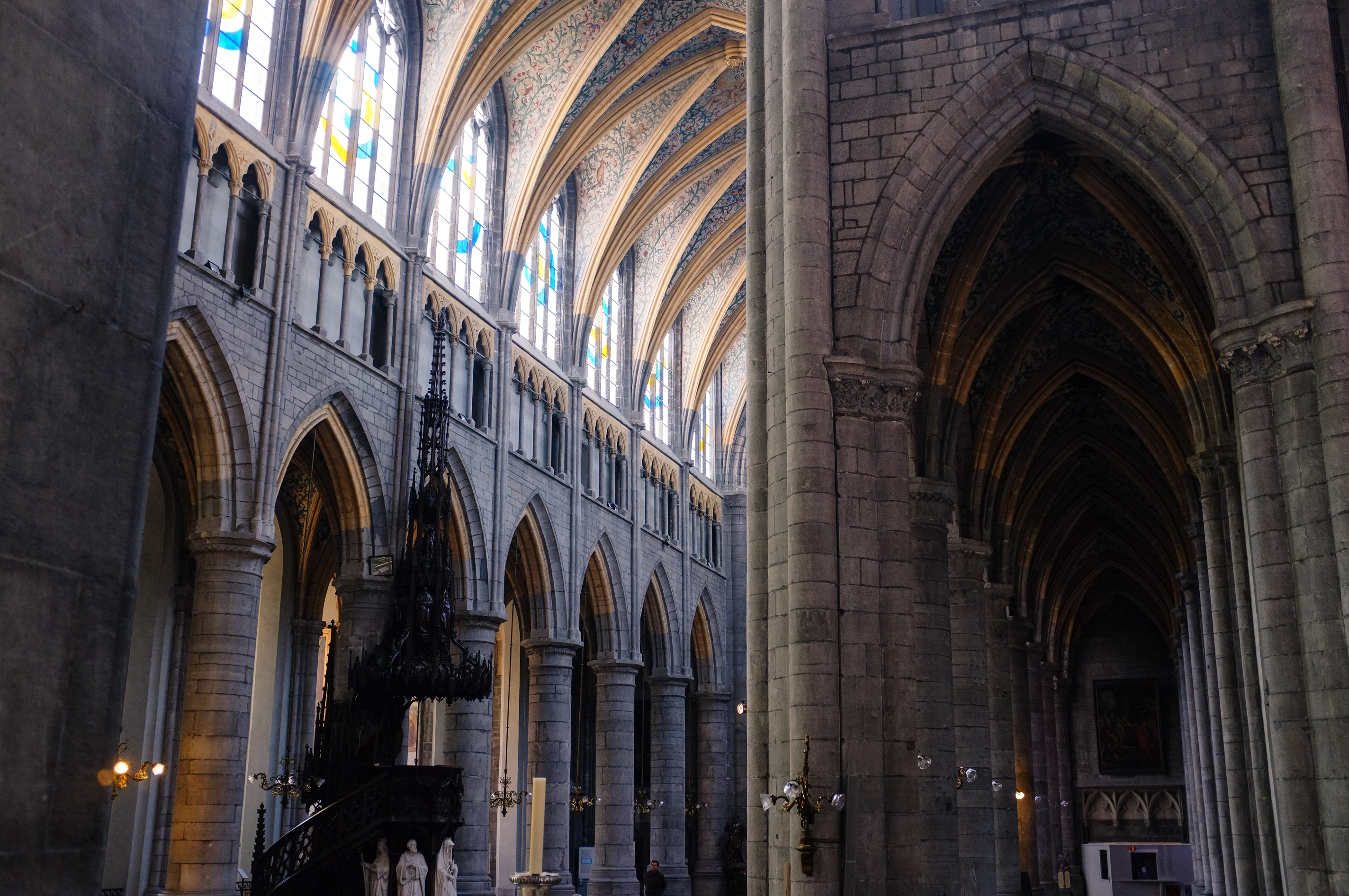
The interior, masterpiece of the Mosan Gothic style, is all in pure lines and of great lightness. The elegant sobriety of the Meuse bluestone is enhanced by the yellow tuffeau of Maastricht and the yellow limestone of Lorraine. The vaults are painted with sumptuous 16th century rinceaux. The church thus appears as a "stone illumination".

The present cathedral was formerly one among the Seven collegiate churches of Liège – St. Peter's, Holy Cross, St. Paul's, St. John's, St. Denis's, St. Martin's and St. Bartholomew's – which until the Liège Revolution of 1789 together comprised the "secondary clergy" of the First Estate in the Prince-bishopric of Liège (the "primary clergy" being the canons of St. Lambert's cathedral).

=== Origin and buildings ===
==== Saint-Germain Chapel ====
In 967, Bishop Eraclus built this church. The basilica was raised only up to the windows when Eraclus died. He instituted a college of twenty canons to whom Notger, who completed the building begun by his predecessor, added ten more.

==== Saint-Calixte Chapel ====
The hamlet formed on the island had rapidly expanded, so much so that a second chapel had to be built a short distance from the first one. It was dedicated to Callixtus I, Pope and martyr. The chroniclers attribute its foundation to Pirard, 36th bishop of Liège and added that he established twelve Benedictine monasteries, the only order then existing in the county of Liège.

==== Saint Paul Collegiate ====
It was upon his return from Cologne, where he had attended the funeral of Bruno the Great, archbishop of that city and vicar of the empire, that Eraclus conceived the project of building a church in honor of Paul the Apostle.

==== First allocations ====
Very little information remains concerning the goods which Eraclus endowed the college with twenty canons which he had created. It seems, however, that the bishop gave the tithes of the church of Lixhe (canton of Glons): what is certain is that the collation of this church, which was erected as a parish around 1200, belonged to the chapter of St. Paul until it was suppressed by the French on 27 November 1797.

Notger solemnly consecrated this church on 7 May 972: two altars were dedicated to Germanus of Auxerre and St. Calixte, in memory of the worship previously rendered to these two saints in the chapels which had been dedicated to them. On 21 April 980, the fortress of Chèvremont was destroyed from top to bottom and the churches that were there demolished. One of them, dedicated to St. Caprasius, had a college of ten priests; the bishop gathered them together with the twenty canons of St. Paul and thus brought their number to thirty. All the property, pensions and tithes of St. Capraise were transferred to the new collegiate church, to which Notger gave the bell called "Dardar", also from Chèvremont. (Note: This bell was said to have been drilled four holes. It was destroyed in the nineteenth century.)

== Building ==
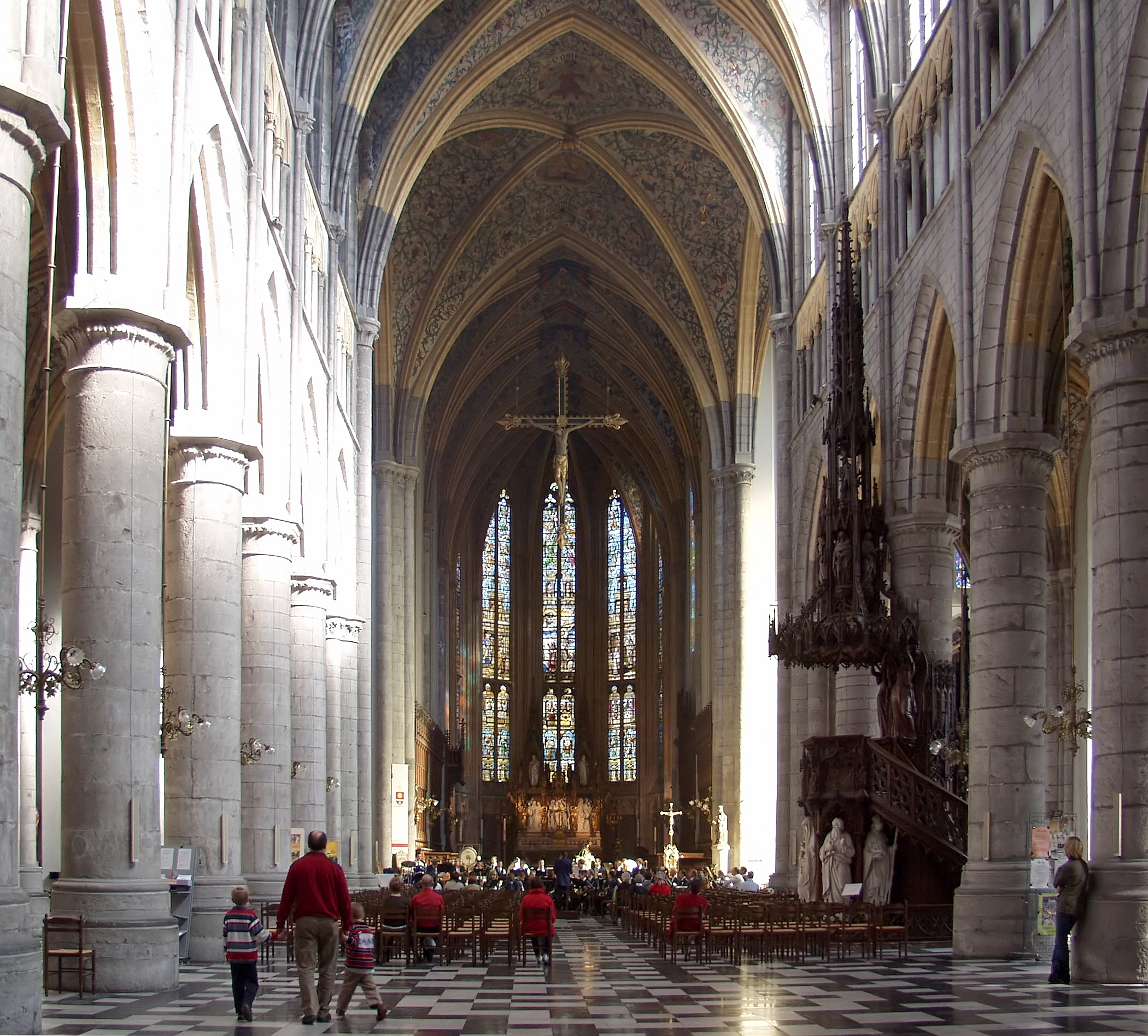
Interior

The apse, constructed in the 14th century in the Rayonnant style, is pentagonal. The choir, the transept, the main nave and the side naves date from the 13th century and have all the characteristics of Gothic architecture of that period. Later Gothic architecture occurs in the windows of the transept and of the nave, the side chapels and the tower. The upper gallery overloaded with pinnacle hooks is modern, as is the storey with the ogival windows and the spire of the belltower with four bells on each side. The lintel of the portal bears an inscription, formerly on the city seal: Sancta Legia Ecclesiae Romanae Filia ("Holy Liège, daughter of the Roman church").

=== First known provost and deans ===
Godescalc
The first authentic mention of a dean and provost of St. Paul can be found in a piece from the year 1083, taken from the cartulary of this Collegiate Church. It talks about damages caused in the alleu of Nandrin, property of the chapter, by Giselbert, Count of Clermont, and his accomplice Frédelon. Bishop Henri de Verdun embraced the defence of the Church's rights and in order to safeguard them in the future, the advocatus of Nandrin's alleu was entrusted to a lord named Conon. This ceremony took place in the temple itself, on St. Paul's Day.

A document from the following year attests to the existence of a cloister at that time and that the brothers of St. Paul were called canons.

In 1086, Godescalc instituted several benefits (Eleemosynœ or Prebetidulœ). They were known for a long time as prebends of Wouteringhen or Wohange. This same year, he founded the altar of saints John the Baptist, Nicolas and Mary Magdalene. It's the oldest simple profit establishment we've ever had. (Note: The prévôt witness of this liberality was called Henri)

In 1101, Dean Godescalc was elevated to the dignity of Archdeacon of Liège, and died shortly afterwards.

Waselin
In 1106, the Collegiale added to its properties part of the territory of Fragnée, acquired and shared by Obert between the churches of the secondary clergy. To celebrate his birthday, on 24 March 1113, Wazelin donated to Saint-Paul his house with all its outbuildings. (Note: To this contract were present Henri, provost, and the canons Walter, priest, and Gozelon, treasurer.)

The latter rented the tithes of the church of Wendeshem for a rent of 5 Marcs of good money payable in Liège.

=== New allocations ===
Godfrey I, Count of Louvain, in 1135, ceded the tithes of the city of Weert and its uncultivated or cultivated territory to the Collegiate chapter. (Note: Among the signatories of this act of liberality were Odon; - Giselbert; - Hellebold; - Helbért; - Franco, the Duke's sample; - Heresto, chamberlain; — Gérard de Vethen (Withem) and his brother Walthère)

In 1182, Dean Henry donated the parish church of Laminne to the chapter, which would keep it until it was abolished by the National Convention on 20 March 1797. He then bequeathed to the collegiate church the land of Hodimont.

Ebalus became dean in 1185: in the same year, a letter mentions the transfer of the church of Hermalle-sous-Huy, to the Flône Abbey. (Note: Ebalus is there with Peter, provost of Saint Paul.) He gave to the collegiate the church of Lavoir, dedicated to Hubertus, whose St. Paul's chapter kept the collation until 1797. (Note: The act relating to this liberality was signed by Albert, provost of the collegiate church and Archdeacon of Liège.)

Pope Celestine III, by a diploma given in Rome on 14 April 1188, confirmed all its possessions to the church of Liège.

Dean Jonah gave the collegiate to the church of St. George's and the church of Verlaine dedicated to St. Remy in 1198.

=== Foundation of Val-Benoit and Val des Écoliers ===
Othon Des Prez, elected dean, founded the convent of Sart in 1220, on the left bank of the river Meuse, half a lieue away from the town, and five years later it was renamed the convent of Sart, which was renamed the convent of Val-Benoît, when Cardinal-Legat Conrad, Bishop of Porto consecrated the church on the day of Pentecost. He then had the priory of Notre-Dame du Val-des-Écoliers erected in Liège, in a place then called Gravière (now La Gravioule) and in Saint-Martin-en-Ile, he raised and endowed, with his own money, an altar in honour of Thomas Becket of Canterbury. (Note: This priory of the schoolchildren's order was converted into an abbey by Pope Gregory XV in 1616 in favour of Winand Latome, who was then prior to it.)

=== New collegiate church ===
The construction of the new building was probably hampered by a lack of funds and progress was slow. The tower seems to have been finished first; in 1275 the dean Guillaume de Fraynoir had two large bells given by him suspended: one, in honour of the patron saint of the church, was named Paula, and the other Concordia, the name of the mother of this apostle. Cast in July 1275, they announced the services celebrated by the dean. The second of these bells, Concordia, was still ringing in the 19th century; it rang the D of the organs and bore an inscription in Gothic letters.

Consecration

Everything leads us to believe that the reconstruction of the collegiate church was very advanced in 1289; indeed, on 11 April, both the consecration of the church and the blessing of the altars took place; solemnities celebrated by the two suffragans of Liège, Edmont, bishop of Courland in Livonia, and brother Bonaventure, of the Order of Citeaux, bishop of Céa.

=== Floods, fires and earthquakes ===
Floods

The coal mines surrounding Liège from the Early Middle Ages, despite the prohibition of digging under the town which was not always respected, digging downstream and upstream had the consequence of making Liège a basin and later a dyke. Despite the ramparts, floods followed one another from century to century.

On 4 January 1374, the river Meuse grew so big that the island's neighbourhood was flooded as well as the collegiate church of St. Paul to the point where it could only be entered by boat.

On 28 January 1408, a flood also damaged the books and jewellery in the crypt, part of the charters, the books, and the ornaments of the collegiate church kept in the treasury. To avoid similar disasters, the floor of the new bookshop was raised and one entered from there by a few steps.

Heavy flooding occurred in 1464. The snow had fallen in abundance for several days before the feast of St.Caprasius of Agen, the rains which followed brought such a flood that on the day after the feast of St. Élisabeth, the swollen floods of the Meuse threatened to invade the collegiate church. The canons only had time to block the door with a kind of dam and had to buy a boat to go to the matins. They used the same means to attend the hours until 23 November, when they were able to go to the services on dry foot.

On 7 February 1571 as a result of a flood, the water rose to a height of 6.40 meters. The memory of this overflow is preserved by the following chronogram engraved on the right pillar of the collegial background next to the jubé. The line indicating the height of the water is 0.84 cm from the current level of the paving stone.

- aLto Mosa LoCo CresCens hVC appVLIt VsqVe

On 15 January 1643, the flood that swept away the Pont des Arches covered the Latin Quarter of Liège and caused immense damage. The waters of the river Meuse rose in St. Paul's church 1.35 meters above the current paving stone. The memory of this event is remembered by the following chronogram engraved on the pillar that supports the tower to the right of the jubé.

- aLtIVs eXpanso fLVMIne DVXIt aqVas

A metal plaque dating from 1926 is located to the right of the cathedral entrance indicating the height of the water at the time of the last flood. Since the installation of the mud and water drain from downstream and upstream sewers, no further flooding has occurred.

Fires

During the night of 6 April 1456, a fire broke out in the room where the rector of the schools was sleeping. Fortunately, it had no consequences.

Earthquake

On 24 December 1755 around 4 o'clock after dinner, tremors were felt in Liège which repeated themselves a quarter of an hour before midnight then a few minutes later. (Note: The memory of the disaster that had occurred in Lisbon on 1 November of the previous year threw fear into the city. Then 60 inhabitants of the different parishes of the city made processions and went to Saint-Lambert, Saint-Pierre, Saint-Paul, Saint-Jean évangéliste and Saint-Remy. These churches remained open for 9 consecutive days.) The 1983 earthquake had no consequences.

=== New acquisitions ===
In 1460, the chapter acquired certain buildings of the Abbey of Val-Saint-Lambert located in the villages of Ramet and Yvoz for 100 almuds of spelt to be supplied annually. In addition, he undertook to pay an annuity to the church of St. Servais of Maastricht in payment of a relief fee.

=== Completion of works and paintings by Lambert Lombart ===
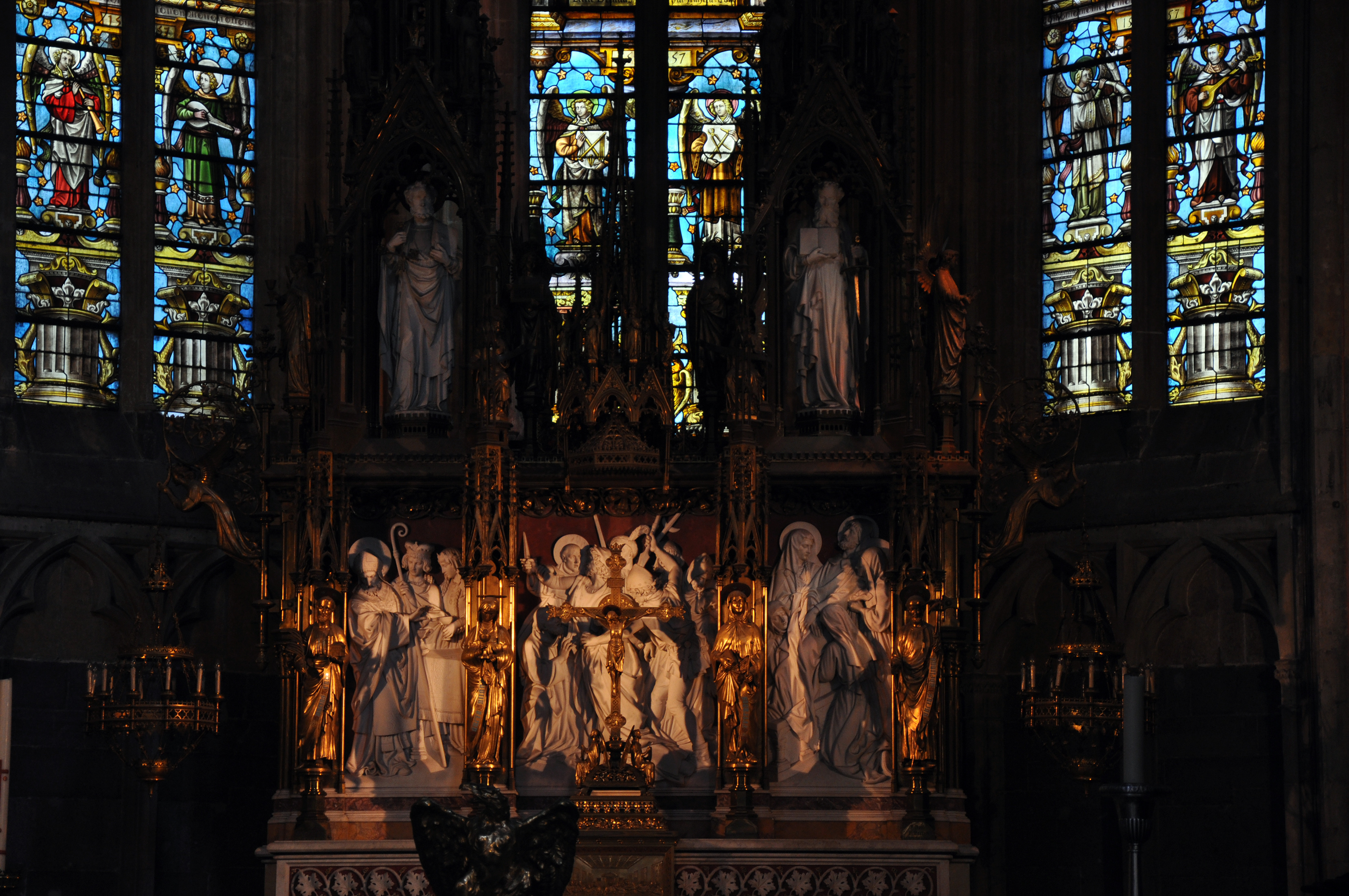
Saint Paul's Cathedral of Liège, altar of the abbey chapel and its altarpiece.

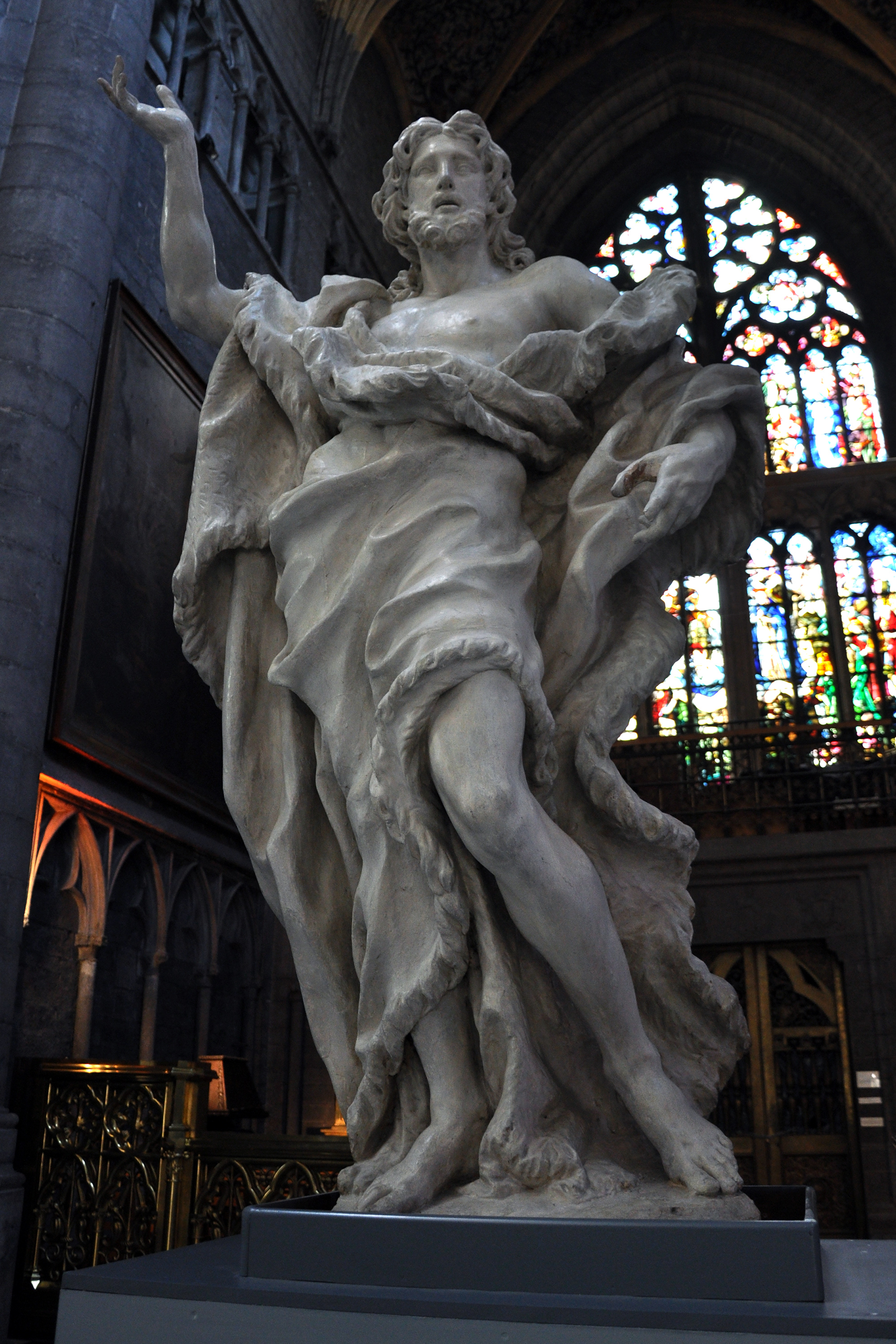
Jean Del Cour: limewood statue of St John the Baptist, dated 1682, from the église Saint-Jean Baptiste on Féronstrée

Lambert Lombart

In 1528 and 1529 several works were executed, among others paintings which according to a manuscript are the work of Lambert Lombard and his pupils.

Glass canopy

In 1530, by the munificence of Léon of Oultres, the collegiate church was enriched by the large canopy illuminating the left arm of the transept at midday. This window escaped the ravages of the French Revolution. On the contrary, the one facing it was completely destroyed.

Windows

In 1557 and 1558, major works were still carried out on the church. The first date can be found on the central window on the south side and on the vault in front of the large nave; it probably indicates the time of construction or repair of the windows on this side. The second is on the corresponding window on the north side. (Note: The first window on the right side of the choir is a gift of Gregory Sylvius who had it placed in 1557, the second one dating from the same period is due to Gilles Blocquerie, canon of Saint-Paul. The central window is a present of the dean Jean Stouten in 1557. It was placed after his death. In 1559 Corneille Van Erp, canon of St. Paul and Bois-le-Duc had the fourth window on the left side of the choir placed at his expense. In the same year, Remacle de Lymborch, canon and professor of medicine gave the fifth window on the same side.)

Western portal

The construction of the west portal under the tower is attributed to dean Thomas Stouten (1556 to 1564): the pediment of this portal is decorated with the arms of coat of Corneille de Berg who succeeded Erard de La Marck who died on 16 February 1538 and Robert who reigned from 1557 to 1564.

=== Printing workshop ===
The name of dean Jean Stouten (1566–1604) is connected with the introduction of printing in Liége. The first book published in the City was the Breviarium in usum venerabilis ecclesiœ collegiatœ Sti Pauli Leodiensis issued from the press of Gautier Morberius, the first printer in Liège. (Note: This work includes two volumes in 8° the first one finished on 1 November 1560 and the second one on 4 July 1561. The great rarity of this book is explained by the small number of copies that were printed; in fact this Breviary was used exclusively for the canons of Saint Paul. The only known copy is in the Bibliothèque Ulysse Capitaine; it is currently on display at the Curtius Museum)

The present church started in 1289, rebuilt in 1528 was completed in 1557.

=== The Christ of Del Cour ===
After the destruction of the dardanelle erected on the Pont des Arches in 1790, the Christ which had been above this tower since 1663, a work of Jean Del Cour, was transferred there. Since 1861, it has surmounted the interior entrance door.

=== French Revolution ===
After the Battle of Jemappes, the French pursued the imperial army and entered into Liège. The collegiate church of St. Paul was chosen to serve as a stable and slaughterhouse and was therefore almost completely destroyed. The chapter of St. Paul suffered the fate reserved for other religious buildings by revolutionary vandals: after looting the building, removing all metals, destroying the main glass windows whose lead was used to melt bullets, selling at auction the furniture, they installed a butcher's shop for their use; the cloisters were changed into stables.

The calm restored by the triumph of the Imperials was not long-lasting. On 17 July 1794, the Convention's armies returned to Liège and the Principality was annexed to France. The following 10 December, the Executive Board decreed a 600 million loan to cover the costs of the war. (Note: The chapter of St. Paul was taxed on 17 May 1796 at an additional cost of 3000 pounds. Not possessing this sum in these difficult times, it had an announcement published in the Gazette de Liège on the following 4, 6 and 8 July that it was seeking to borrow a capital of 3000 pounds with interest to supply this tax, but this attempt had no result.)

=== From collegiate church to cathedral ===
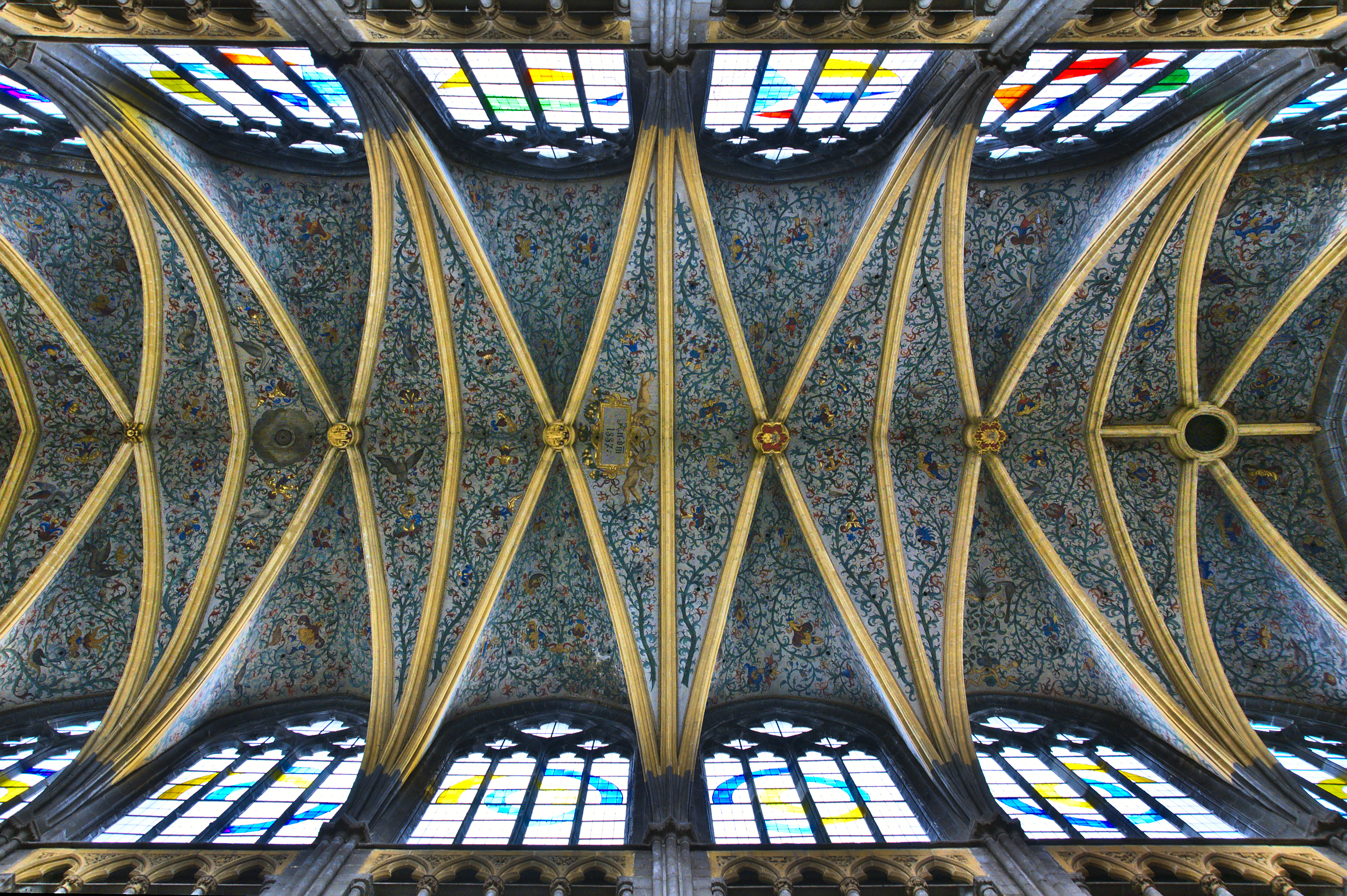
Saint Paul's Cathedral in Liège, the vault of the nave, with its yellow stone arches and its vaults coated and painted with rinceaux

In 1802, the former collegiate church was erected as a cathedral and in 1805 the organs of the old Collégiale Saint-Pierre de Liège and most of the treasures of Saint Lambert's Cathedral were transported there.

==== Return of the relics ====
On 30 December 1803, the Bishop wrote to the minister of worship Portalis asking that the government pay the fees and allowances due for the brought back from Hamburg. These six boxes contained the relics of the Saints and the debris from the treasure of Saint Lambert's Cathedral returned to the new cathedral. One month later, on 30 January 1804, Portalis replied that the government had decided that the amount of the objects delivered to Hamburg for the service of the navy would be reimbursed but that this service being extremely overburdened by the present circumstances, it could not foresee the moment when it would be liable to pay the effects which were assigned to it. The treasure of Saint-Lambert seized in Hamburg by the commissioners of the Republic who accompanied the armies was largely sold on the orders of the 1st Consul by Commissioner Lachevadière. The sale yielded nearly a million and a half that was applied to the needs of the navy.

==== Compensation ====
After the signature of the Concordat of 1801 and the restoration of the cult, Napoleon had the cathedral granted a recognition of one million to be paid from the treasury of the State, but this debt was not discharged during the imperial period. (Note: During the fall of Napoleon, the Chapter addressed the liquidation commission established in Paris by the Sovereign Allies to know the debts of the Empire in order to obtain payment. Its request was turned down. Later on, after the reunion of Belgium in Holland, new approaches were made to the Dutch government but without success. It clearly refused to acknowledge and pay this debt. The spoliation was thus total.)

==== Restitution ====
In 1805, in accordance with its promises, the imperial government issued a decree on 6 March of the following year, according to which the factories of the churches were granted their property, which was neither sold nor alienated. This decree allowed the new cathedral to regain possession of part of the property and annuities it possessed before the Revolution, and on 16 September the cathedral was given back possession of part of the property and annuities derived from the Cathédrale Notre-Dame-et-Saint-Lambert de Liège.

==== Translation of Saint-Lambert ====
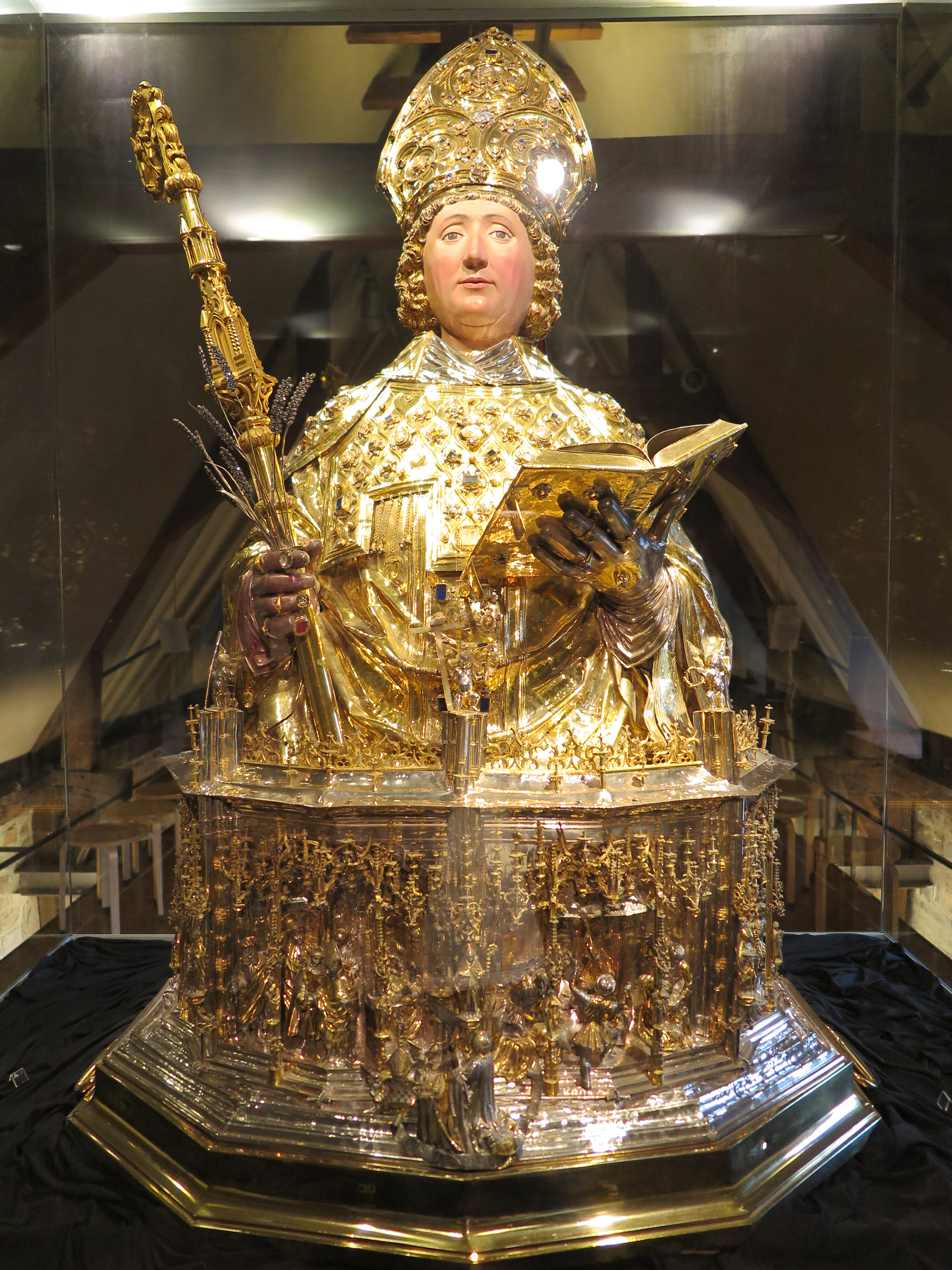
Reliquary bust of Saint Lambert

In execution of bishop Zaepffel's mandate, the translation ceremony of the bust of Saint Lambert and relics of the Saints took place on 1 January 1804. It was announced the day before by the sound of the bells of all the churches. They had been stored at Saint-Nicolas Au-Trez.

=== Erection of the bell tower ===
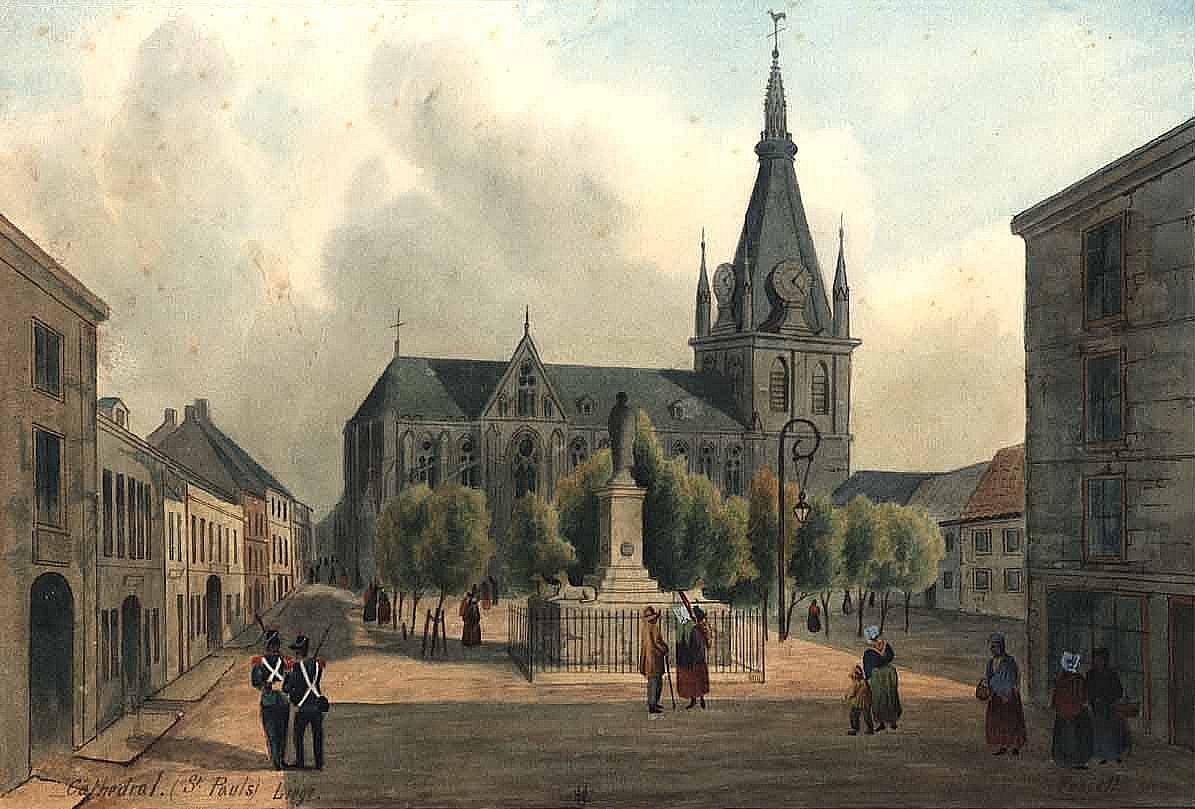
Cathédrale Saint-Paul (mid-19th century) Watercolor by J. Fussell

The collegiate church used to have only a small bell tower, the drawing of which can still be seen in Les Délices du Pays de Liège; the chapter wished to construct a spire, seeking to reproduce the shape of that of the one of Cathédrale Notre-Dame-et-Saint-Lambert de Liège. The Cathedral Chapter met on 28 June 1810, to deliberate on the erection of a tower. (Note: By means of a sum of thirty to forty thousand florins Brabant-Liège of which they were depositories and had been intended for this expenditure for a long time.) The following day, 29 June, the Chapter decided to build the tower. to acquire for this purpose the spire of the tower of Sint-Truiden Abbey. But it was not until 1812, following a request from Napoleon, that the tower, with its ogival windows, was raised one floor and the bell tower was installed. The side facing west is pierced by a huge window with glowing mullions. The part that rises above it and contains the bells is built in sandstone from the square towers of the old cathedral of Saint-Lambert. On each of its three free sides there are two large windows with sound-absorbing panels. Its construction was completed at the end of October 1811, it replaced the original structure of the original tower, which until that time only rose to the height of the roof and was demolished in May of the same year. The framed arrowhead that ends the tower rises to a height of 90 meters. It was started immediately after the completion of the previous part and finished towards the end of August 1812. The cross which overlooks it was placed the following 1 October.

==== Chimes ====
The chime of the former Saint Lambert's Cathedral which the imperial government had donated to the new cathedral in 1804 was placed here. (Note: On 2 March 1804, Prefect Demousseaux took a decree by which he made available to the administrators of the Saint-Paul factory the carillon, clock, drums and scrap metal of Saint-Lambert for the service of the new cathedral.)

=== Restoration ===
In the 1850s, the cathedral underwent a major renovation by architect Jean-Charles Delsaux.

== Description ==
=== Three naves ===
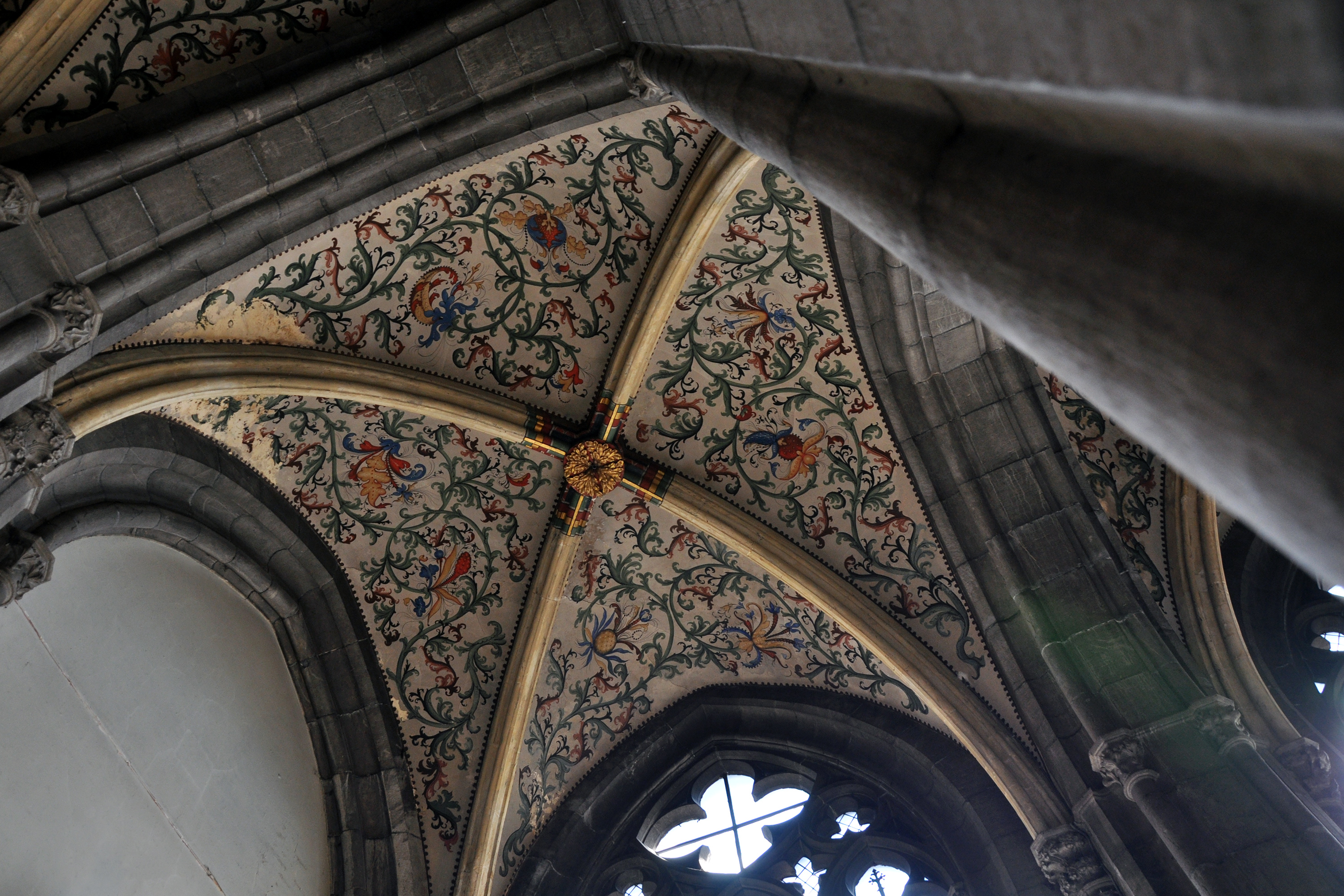
Plafond d'une chapelle, Cathédrale Saint-Paul

The collegiate church of St. Paul has the shape of a Latin Cross 84.50 meters long by 33.60 meters wide and 24 meters high under the keystone. The transept has a length of 33 meters on 11.60 meters wide. The vessel is divided into 3 naves, 2 low sides and a choir without collaterals. His architect is unknown.

The apse built in the fourteenth century in radiant style is of pentagonal form. The choir, the transept, the large nave and side naves are from the 13th century and have all the characteristics of the primary gothique. The secondary gothic is found in the transept windows, the high windows of the ship, the lateral chapels and the tower. The upper gallery, overcrowded with hooked pinnacles, is modern, like the ogival windowed floor and the spire of the bell tower, next to four bells. The lintel of the portal bears an inscription that once appeared on the seal of the city: Sancta Legia Ecclesiae Romanae Filia (Holy Liège, daughter of the Roman Church). All the red marbles in St. Paul's originate from the Rochefort Abbey, the black marbles of Dinant and the whites of Italy coming from Carrara.

=== The cloister ===
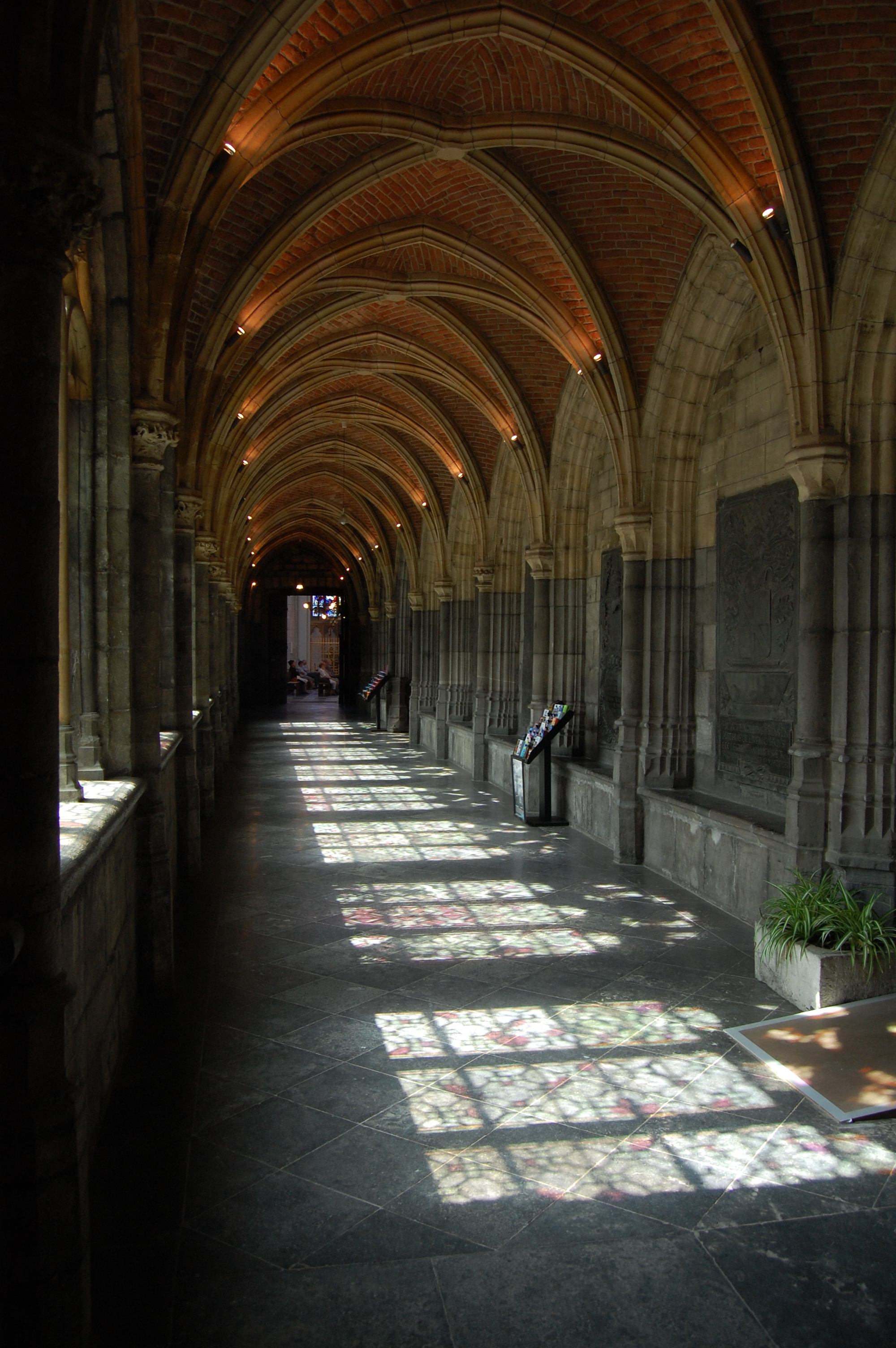
Cloister (east wing) of St. Paul's Cathedral in Liège

The former chapitral cloister of the collegiate church consists of three galleries freely communicating with each other and opening into the church through two doors, one at the bottom of the building and the other adjacent to the left arm of the transept. Before the construction of the chapels on the lower sides, to add to the solidity of the building and for its embellishment, the cloister was square, and one can see the remains in the attics above these chapels. These galleries built in different periods date from the late 15th and early 16th centuries. The first part of the cloister was laid on 6 June 1445 by Daniel de Blochem. They form the three sides of a long square oriented east to the south and west, the fourth gallery is replaced by the lower left side of the collegiate church. They circumscribe a courtyard and differ from each other. The west gallery is older than the others and its ornamentation is also more meticulous, 17.50 by 4.75 metres long, it communicates with the collegiate church through a door surmounted by a great Christ in ancient wood.

=== Entrance to the cloister ===
Next to the door that leads into the church at the north end of this gallery, a second door opens onto a richly decorated gate at the foot of the tower overlooking St. Paul's Square. This porch features deep ornamental arches and an unusual decoration, partly ogival. It is dated from the Renaissance. This gate, closed by an iron gate and decorated with a central stone medallion framing a high relief depicting the Conversion of Paul the Apostle placed between two low reliefs and the arabesques of the lower panels frame two small low reliefs, one on the right side representing the Nativity, the other on the left showing the Resurrection of the Savior. A series of twelve bas-reliefs represent eight framed heads and fantasy ornaments. Seven niches remained devoid of their statues. The overhanging pinion bears the arms of coat of Corneille of Berghes, bishop from 1538 to 1544.

=== Chapter hall ===
One enters by the cloisters on the east side in the chapel of the chapter hall. The exterior door comes from the church of the former Couvent des Récollets de Liège located in the district of Outremeuse. It closed the entrance of the choir where it was placed between two altars. This richly carved oak door has two panels, the side panel representing the Perron of Liège and the top panels sculpted to date and elegantly crafted presenting the two LG letters.

== Index of artists ==
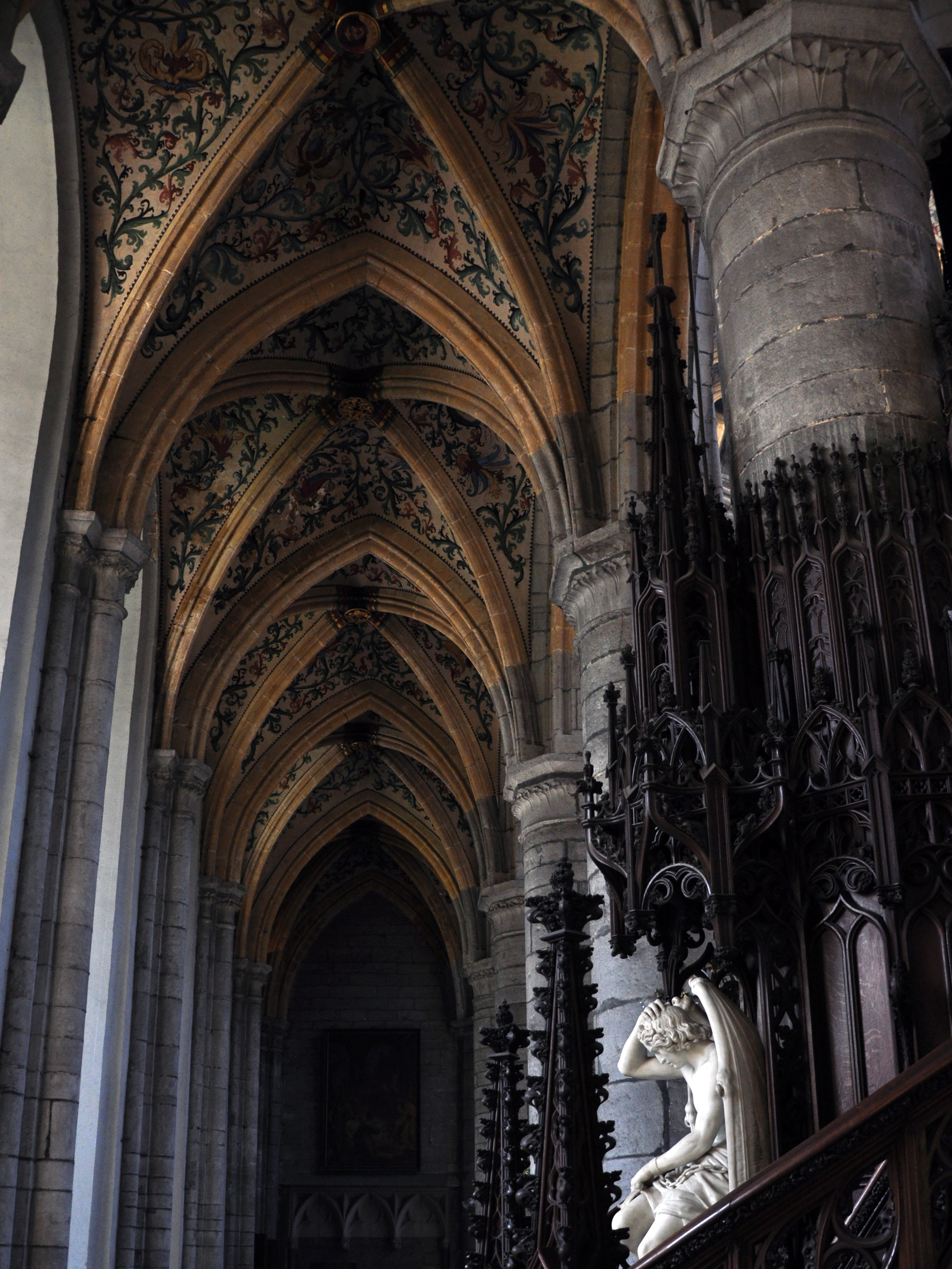
Saint-Paul de Liège Cathedral: South side, seen from the choir to the facade, with the back of the pulpit in the foreground.

A chronological list of artists who worked at St. Paul's Church or whose work is in the church.

=== Painters ===
- Gerard Seghers (1591–1651)
- Erasmus Quellinus II (1607–1678)
  - Les quatre Évangélistes
- Jean-Guillaume Carlier (1638–1675)
  - Le Baptême de Jésus-Christ
- Gérard de Lairesse (1641–1711)
  - 1 painting
- Jean-Joseph Ansiaux (1764–1840)
  - three paintings, one of which won a gold medal
- Adolphe Tassin (1852–1923)
- Jean Hubert Tahan
  - Le Massacre de Saint-Lambert
- Bertholet Flémal
  - Three paintings
- Jules Helbig (1821–1906)
- Auguste Chauvin (1810–1884)
- Otto van Veen
  - Descente de croix
- Gérard Douffet
  - 1 painting.

=== Sculptures ===
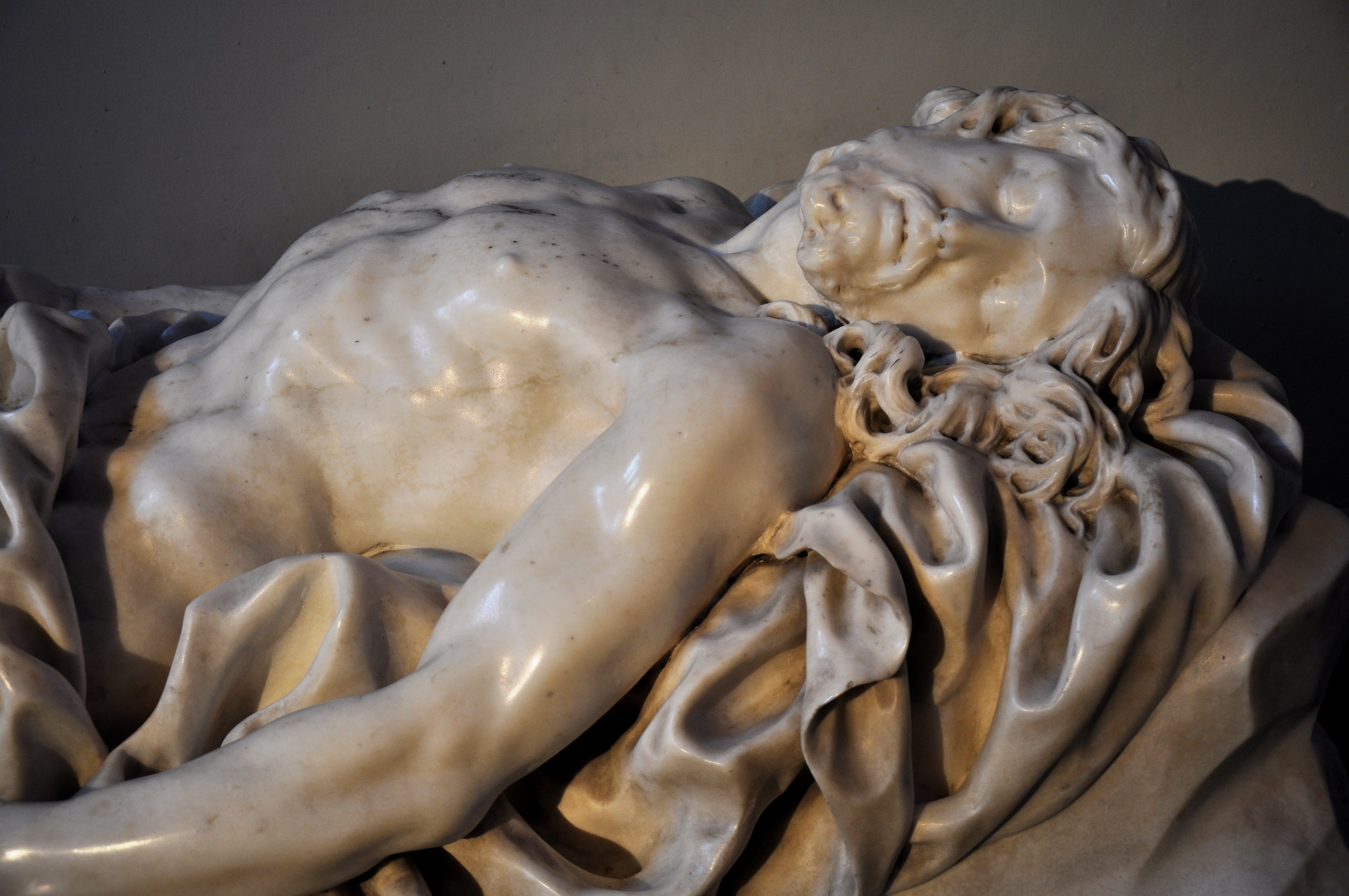
Christ gisant (1696) by Jean Del Cour, Cathédrale Saint-Paul de Liège: Tomb effigy at the funerary monument of Walthère de Liverlo and Marie d'Ogier, from the former Church of the Sepulchres, known as the Good Children, in Liège.

- Jean Del Cour (1631–1707)
  - Le Christ remettant les clés à Saint Pierre, 1680 (bas-relief from the old jubé of the Collégiale Saint-Pierre de Liège dieux de saint Pierre et de saint Paul, 1680
  - Statue de Jean-Baptiste, 1682
  - Christ gisant, white marble, 1696
  - Christ en bronze above the main gate, northbound. This Christ was once on the Dardanelles of the Pont des Arches, on this fort built by Emperor Maximilien, to restrain the inhabitants of the noisy neighborhood of Outre-Meuse!..

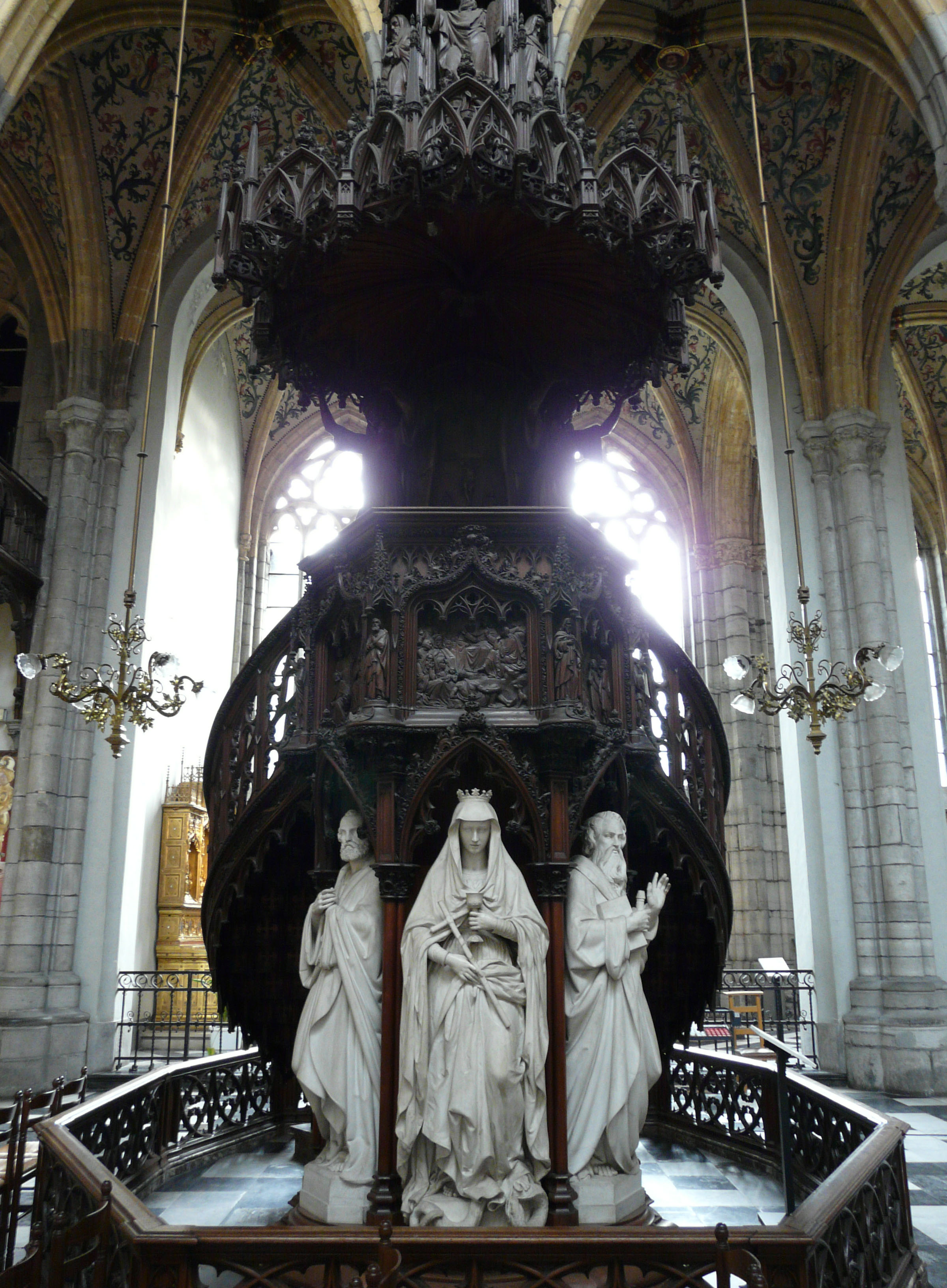
The pulpit of the cathedral, as seen from the nave

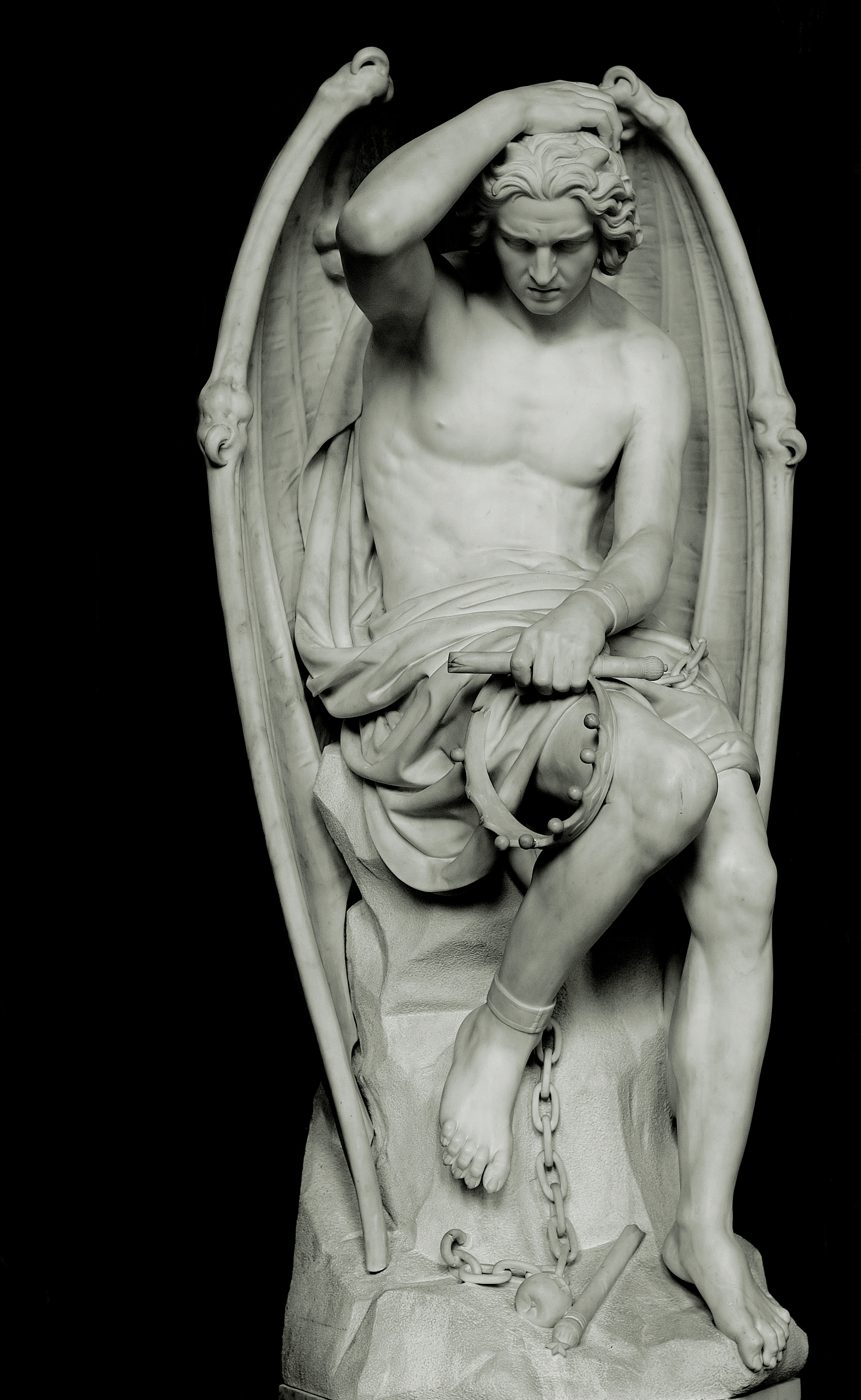
Le génie du mal famous white marble statue by Guillaume Geefs, on the back of the pulpit.

- Guillaume Geefs (1805–1883)
  - Le génie du mal sculpture represents Lucifer in his physical perfection, chained, seated, and almost naked, a sheet covering his thighs. In fact, the statue of Geefs replaces a sculpture previously created by his younger brother Joseph Geefs, removed from the cathedral because of its distracting appeal and unhealthy beauty. The statue of Joseph Geefs is part of the collections of the Royal Museums of Fine Arts of Belgium.
- François-Joseph Dewandre (1758–1835)
  - Mausoleum of prince-évêque Velbrück located in the cloister.

=== Others ===
- Jean-Joseph Dehin (1809–1871), goldsmith
- Jean-Charles Delsaux (1821–1893), architect
- Auguste Van Assche (1826–1907), architect
- Max Ingrand (1908–1969), master glassmaker

=== Works transferred during the Revolution ===
After the collegiate church became the new cathedral of Liège, it provided shelter and security to a whole series of works of art originating from other churches in Liège that had been demolished or closed in the revolutionary turmoil.

- from the église Saint-Jean-Baptiste:
  - the Sedes sapientiae from the 13th century exposed to the front of the cathedral choir.
  - the silver statuettes of goldsmith Henri de Flémal (1656, 1663, 1678);
- from the Church of the Wallon Jesuits :
  - La Descente de croix by Gérard Seghers (1589–1651)
- from the église des Carmes déchaussés in Féronstrée et Hors-Château:
  - Le Baptême du Christ by Jean-Guillaume Carlier (Liège, 1638–1675);
- from the église des Sépulcrines, called "des Bons-Enfants" (good children):
  - Le Christ gisant (1696) by Jean Del Cour
- From the former collégiale Saint-Pierre
  - The two bas-reliefs of Jean Del Cour of the life of St. Peter
- from the église Notre-Dame aux Fonts:
  - Saint Charles Borromée soignant les pestiférés attributed to Bertholet Flémal (Liège, 1614–1675).
- from the high altar of the ancient Cathédrale Notre-Dame-et-Saint-Lambert de Liège:
  - L'Assomption by Gérard de Lairesse (1687), today transplanted in the chapel of the Blessed Sacrament of St. Paul.

== Cathedral treasure ==
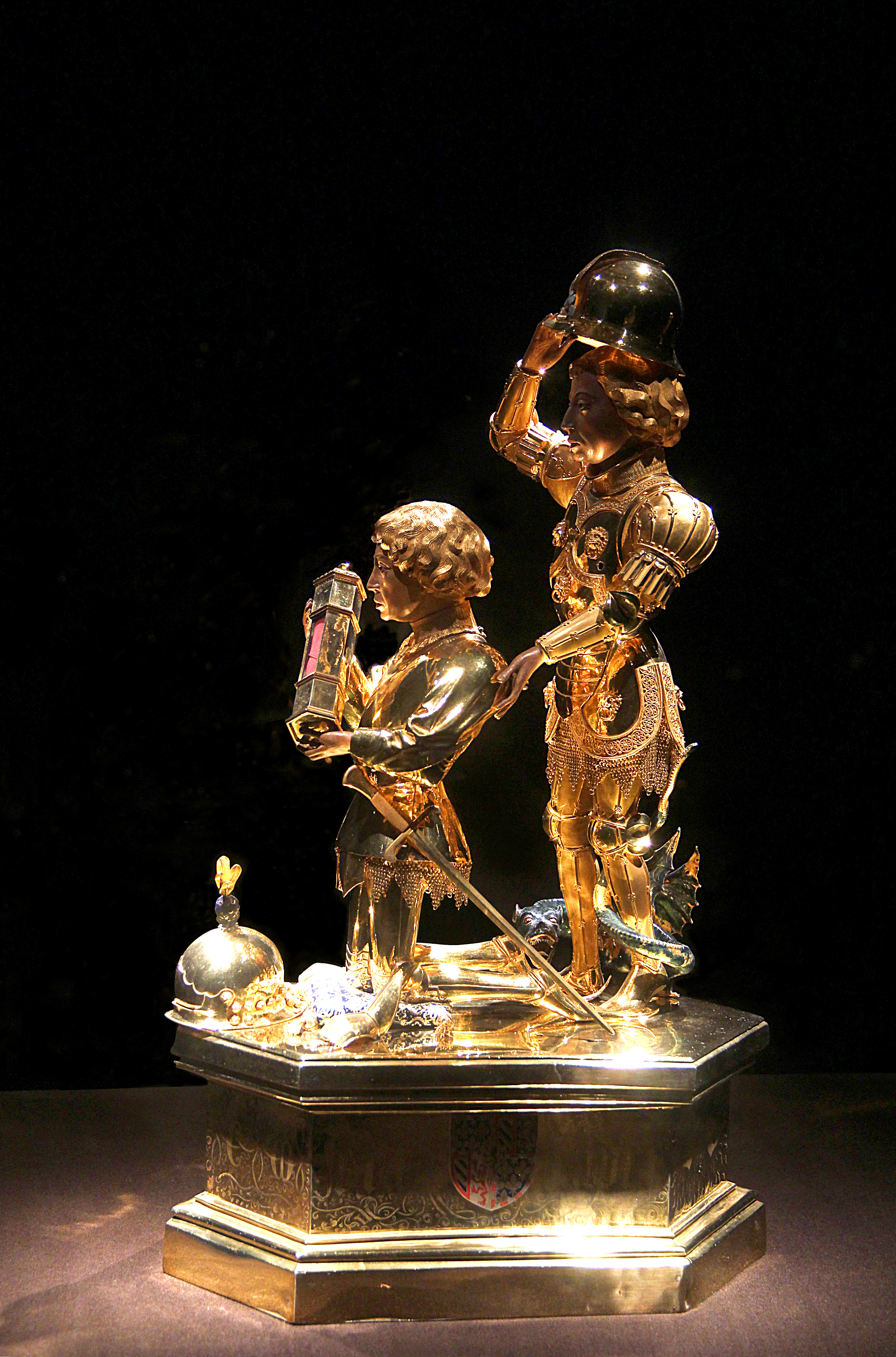
Reliquary of Charles the Bold, 1470s

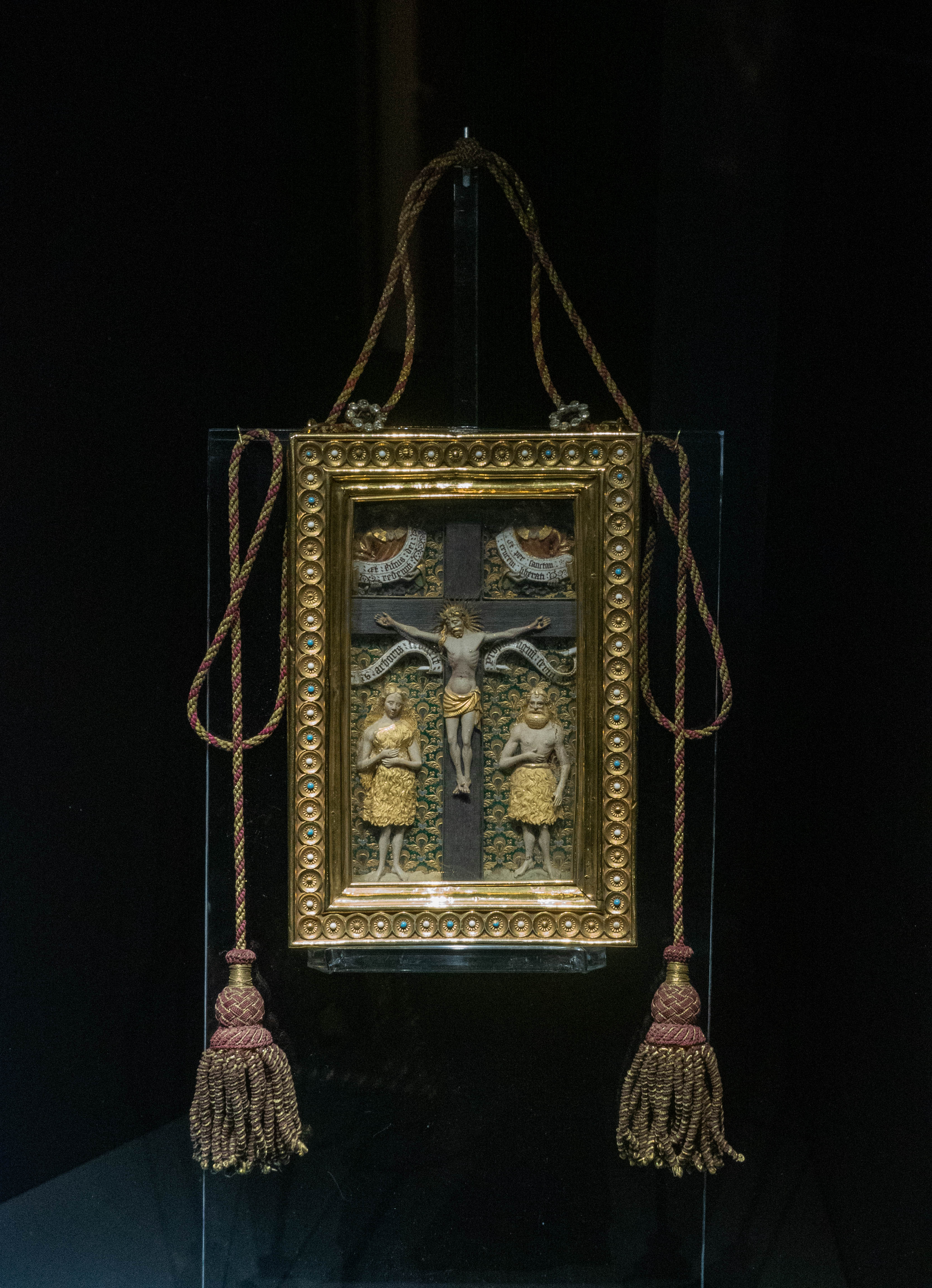
Reliquary of the True Cross, c. 1420

The cathedral has numerous works of art presented in eight thematic exhibition rooms with a journey through the art and history of the former Prince-Bishopric of Liège.

== Core sources ==
=== Cartulary of Saint-Paul ===
- 1086: Foundation of the St. John the Baptist Altar in St. Paul's Church and legacy to the poor.
- Circa 1100: Charter of fraternity between the Canons of St. Paul and the Abbey of St. James, right of fishing granted to the monks of this abbey.
- 1169: Charter relating to the Tithes of Lixhe
- 1233: Agreement between St Lambert's Cathedral and the collegiate churches of Liège for their mutual defence
- 1238: Pro piscariâ by Ramet
- 1242: Dispute between the Abbey of Santiago and Humbert de Saive Chevalier, ended by the arbitration of Othon Doyen de Paul
- 1249: Founding of the altar of Notre-Dame de Saint-André and Saint-Martin
- 1251: Convention between the Abbey of Val Dieu and the Chapter of Saint Paul concerning the tithe of Froidmont
- 1254: Letter from Cardinal Peter Légal of the Holy See granting indulgences to those who will contribute to the completion of the Church
- 1289: Charter of Consecration of the Church (11 April)
- 1293: Charter relative to the claustrale house given by the Abbey of Aulne
- 1300: Indulgences granted by Pope Nicholas
- 1381: Carta quod canonicus non possit habere bona Ecclesiae ad trecensum
- 1444: Erectio festi Exaltationis sanctae Crucis
- Daniel de Blochem canon of Saint-Paul: XIth manuscript Liber de Servis et aqua sancti Pauli.
- 1483: Erectio confraternitatis beatae Mariae Virginis in Ecclesia Collegiata S. Pauli Leodiensis facta anno
- 1494: Fundatio primae Missae et S. Danielis in Ecclesia S. Pauli facta per Dominum Arnoldum Pickar
- 1515: de Cletis Foundation

=== Printed sources ===
- 1560: Jean Stouten, dean: Ancien bréviaire de la collégiale de Saint-Paul. Premier livre imprimé de et à Liège by Gautier Morberius, currently exhibited at the Curtius Museum.
- 1621: List of Altars erected in the former collegiate church of Saint-Paul.
- 1622: Alber de Limborsch: Fundatio S. Pauli, printed in 4° at Ouwerx (400 hexameters)
- O.J. Thimister, Essai historique sur l'église de Saint Paul, Spee Zelis, Liège, 1867

== Bibliography ==
- Marie-Cécile Charles (2006). La cathédrale de Liège. Carnets du Patrimoine. Institut du Patrimoine wallon. p. 48.
- Isabelle Lecocq (2006). "Un dessin de la Crucifixion attribué à Lambert Lombard et le vitrail de la Crucifixion de la cathédrale Saint-Paul à Liège (1557)". La peinture ancienne et ses procédés: copies, répliques, pastiches. Peeters Publishers. pp. 258–265. ISBN 9042917768.
- Isabelle Lecocq (2016). Les vitraux de la cathédrale Saint-Paul à Liège; Six siècles de création et de restauration. Liège: Comité wallon pour le Vitrail associé au Corpus Vitrearum Belgique-België. p. 240. ISBN 978-2503568171.
- Forgeur, Richard (1969). "La construction de la collégiale Saint-Paul à Liège aux temps romans et gothiques" (PDF). Bulletin de la Commission royale des Monuments et des Sites (in French). Vol. XVIII. Brussel: Commission royale des Monuments et des Sites. pp. 156–204.
