= Seven collegiate churches of Liège =

Belgian collegiate churches

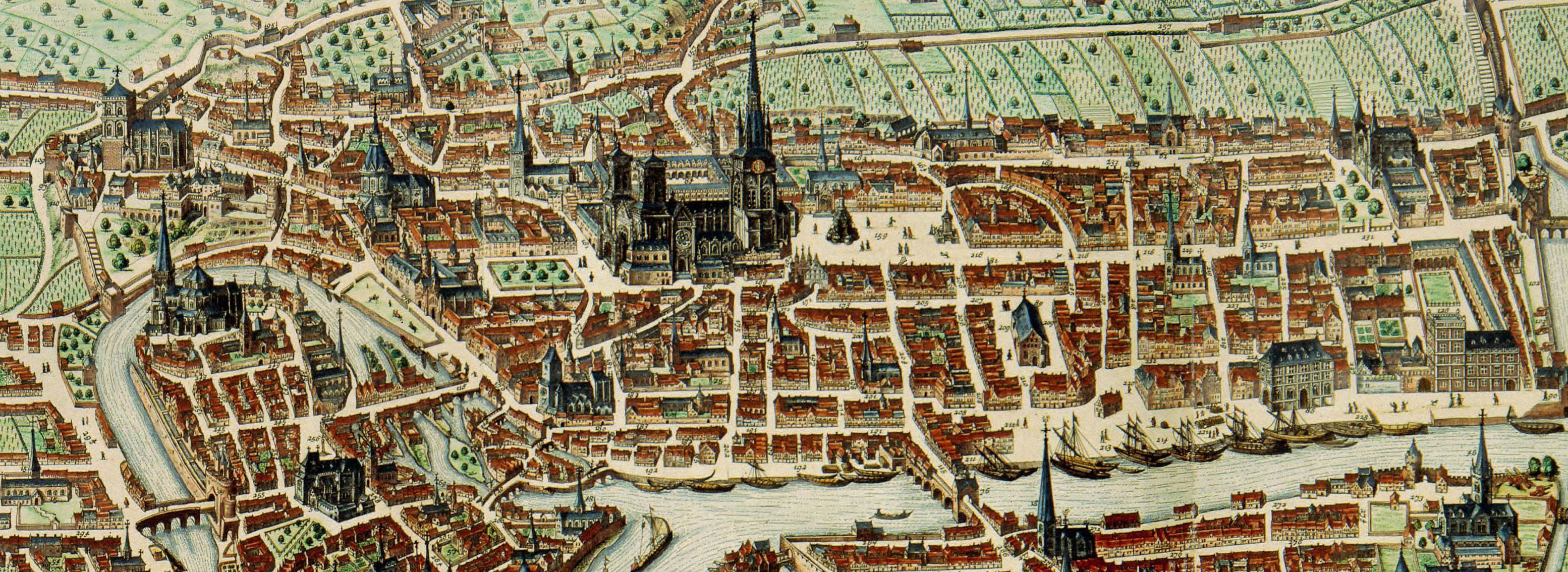
A 17th-century view of Liège showing the cathedral and the seven collegiate churches

The seven collegiate churches of Liège (French: sept collégiales de Liège) were a group of 10th- and early-11th-century foundations in the city of Liège. Each of these collegiate churches was a privileged corporation within the city, with its own precincts and rights, while until the Liège Revolution of 1789 the canons collectively had a key corporate status in the First Estate of the prince-bishopric of Liège as the "secondary clergy", alongside the "primary clergy" belonging to the chapter of Saint Lambert's Cathedral.

By the 18th century, each of the collegiate chapters had 30 canons, all of whom were required to be graduates in Theology or Canon Law. Each chapter had its own provost, dean, cantor, scholaster and treasurer.

The seven churches were:

Name	Image
St Paul (now the cathedral)	
St Peter	
St Martin	
St Denis	
St John the Evangelist	
Holy Cross	
St Bartholomew	
