= Collegiate Church of the Holy Cross, Liège =

Roman Catholic church in Liège, Belgium

Coordinates: 50.6454°N 5.5700°E

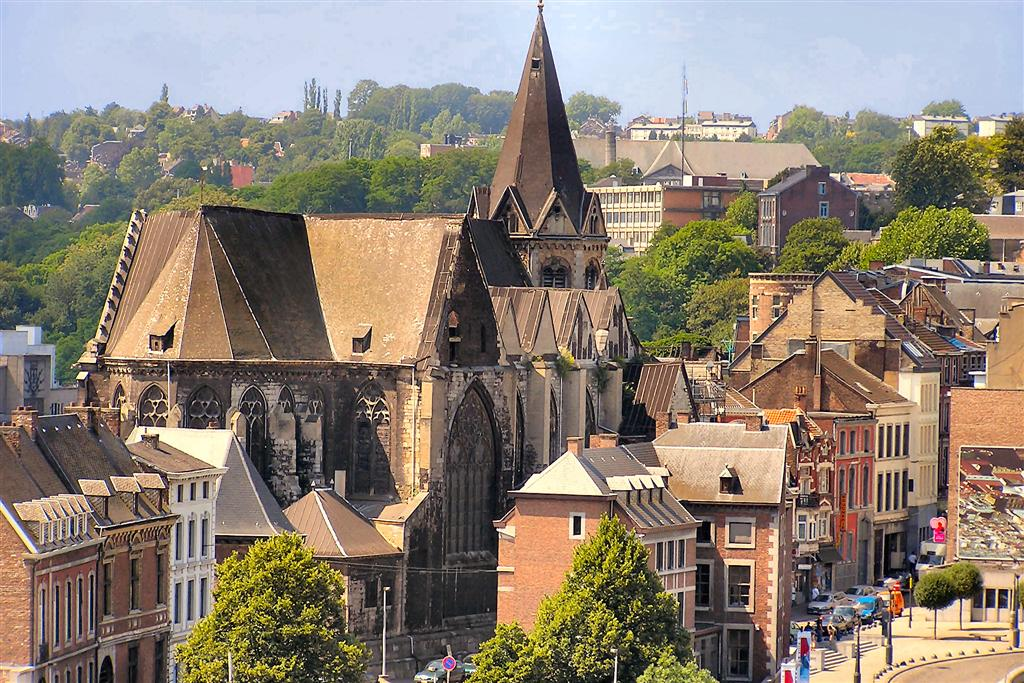

The Collegiate Church of the Holy Cross (French: Collégiale Sainte-Croix) is a Roman Catholic church in Liège, Belgium, located on the Place Verte at the corner of the Rue Sainte-Croix and the Rue Haute-Sauvenière. It was founded between 976 and 986 by bishop Notger and held the original St Hubert's Key, previously in the treasury of St. Peter's Church. Previously a collegiate church, its chapter of secular canons was suppressed in 1797 following the Liège Revolution. The church itself was handed back for use as a worship space in 1802.

== Sources ==
- https://www.fabrice-muller.be/sc/sc1.html
