= Eraclus =

10th-century Bishop of Liège

- Bishop of Liège
- Diocese: Liège
- See: Saint Lambert's Cathedral, Liège
- Elected: 959
- Predecessor: Baldrick I
- Successor: Notker of Liège

Orders
- Consecration: 21 August 959

Personal details
- Died: 27–28 October 971
- Buried: Church of St Martin, Liège

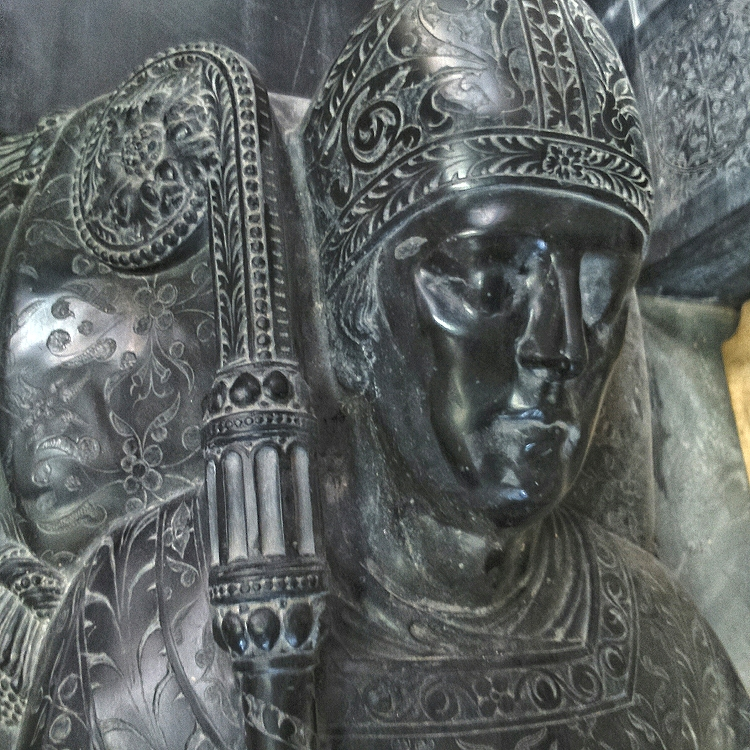

Eraclus, alternatively Eraclius or Evraclus, was the 25th bishop of Liège (959–971).

== Life ==
Educated by Rathier, Eraclus served as the dean of Bonn, before being elected as the bishop of Liège with the support of Bruno of Cologne. He was consecrated on 21 August 959. While bishop he founded two collegiate churches, St Paul's (which later became Liège Cathedral) and St Martin's. He had a particular devotion to Martin of Tours, attributing to that saint a healing he had experienced.

Eraclus placed strong emphasis on the importance of scholarship, laying the foundations for Liège becoming an international centre of learning.

In 968 he accompanied Emperor Otto I to Italy, and on 22 December rallied the emperor's panic-stricken army during an unexpected total solar eclipse.

Eraclus died on 27 or 28 October 971 and was buried in the church of St Martin that he had founded.

He was succeeded by Notker, who would establish the Prince-Bishopric of Liège.

== Writings ==
- A letter to his teacher, Rathier
- An account of his healing by the intercession of St Martin of Tours

Catholic Church titles
Preceded by Baldrick I	Bishop of Liège; 959–971	Succeeded by Notker of Liège
