= Collegiate Church of St John the Evangelist, Liège =

Roman Catholic church in Liège, Belgium

Coordinates: 50.6430°N 5.5673°E

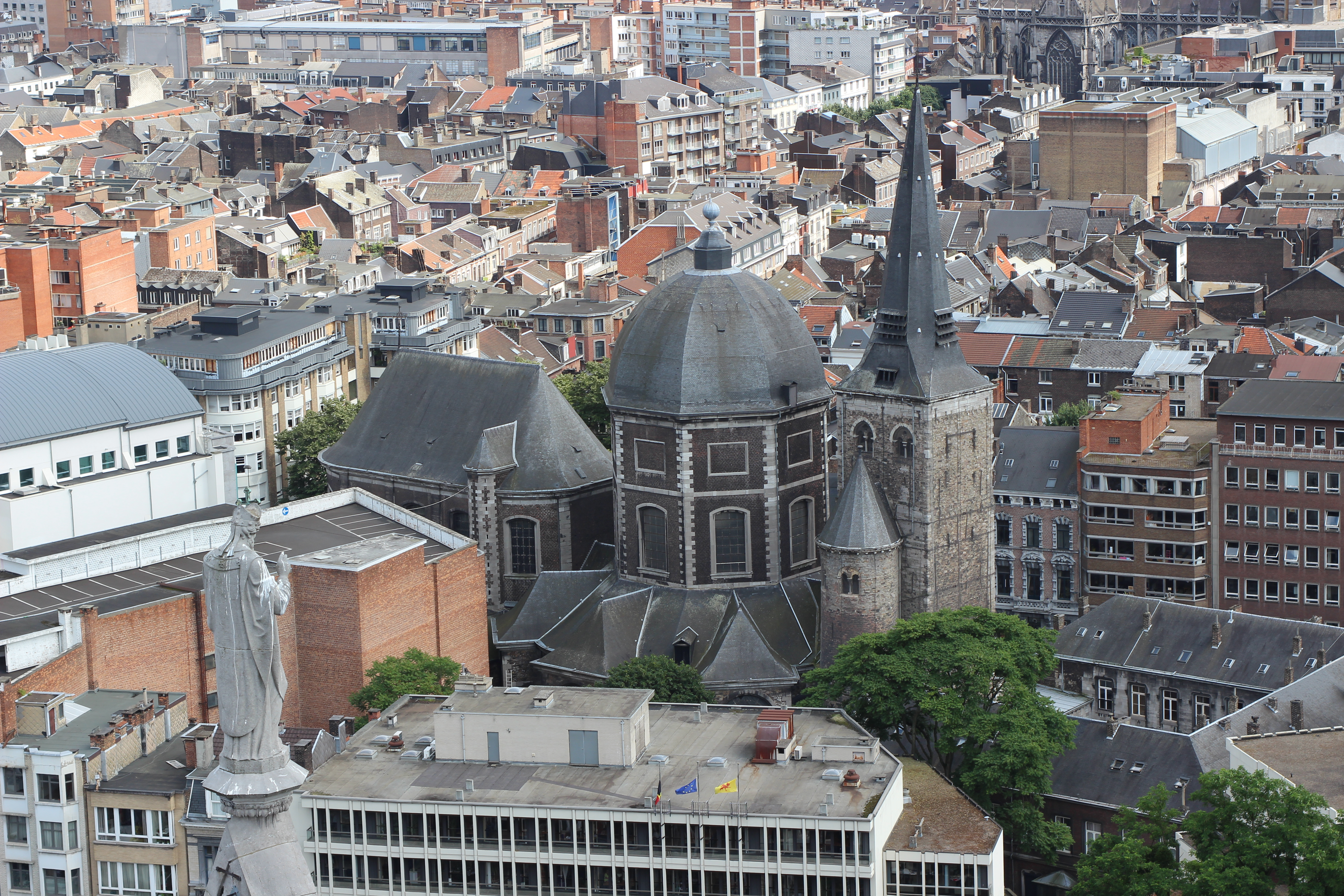

The Collegiate Church of St. John the Evangelist (French: Collégiale Saint-Jean l'Évangéliste) is a Roman Catholic church in Liège, Belgium. It was founded as a collegiate church by Notker of Liège around 980, and consecrated in 987. It was the place of Notker's tomb. The church was suppressed in 1797 during the French Revolution, the building being confiscated and sold in 1798.

On 23 March 1879, Pope Leo XIII canonically crowned the statue of Saint Joseph (1757) within this shrine, in honor of the 200th anniversary of the request by King Charles II of Spain to Pope Innocent XI to consecrate Belgium to Saint Joseph. The coronation feast also coincided with the 203rd anniversary of Diocese of Liege by request of Emperor Leopold I in 1676 and approved by Pope Clement X. The notarized Pontifical decree was received by Bishop of Liege, Victor Joseph Doutreloux. It is now located and enshrined at the private side chapel of Saint Joseph.

Originally an octagonal building in Mosan Romanesque style, incorporating elements of the Church of the Holy Sepulchre in Jerusalem, the church was completely rebuilt in a late Baroque style in 1754–1784. It has been in use as a parish church since 1809, and has been listed as a monument since 1952.

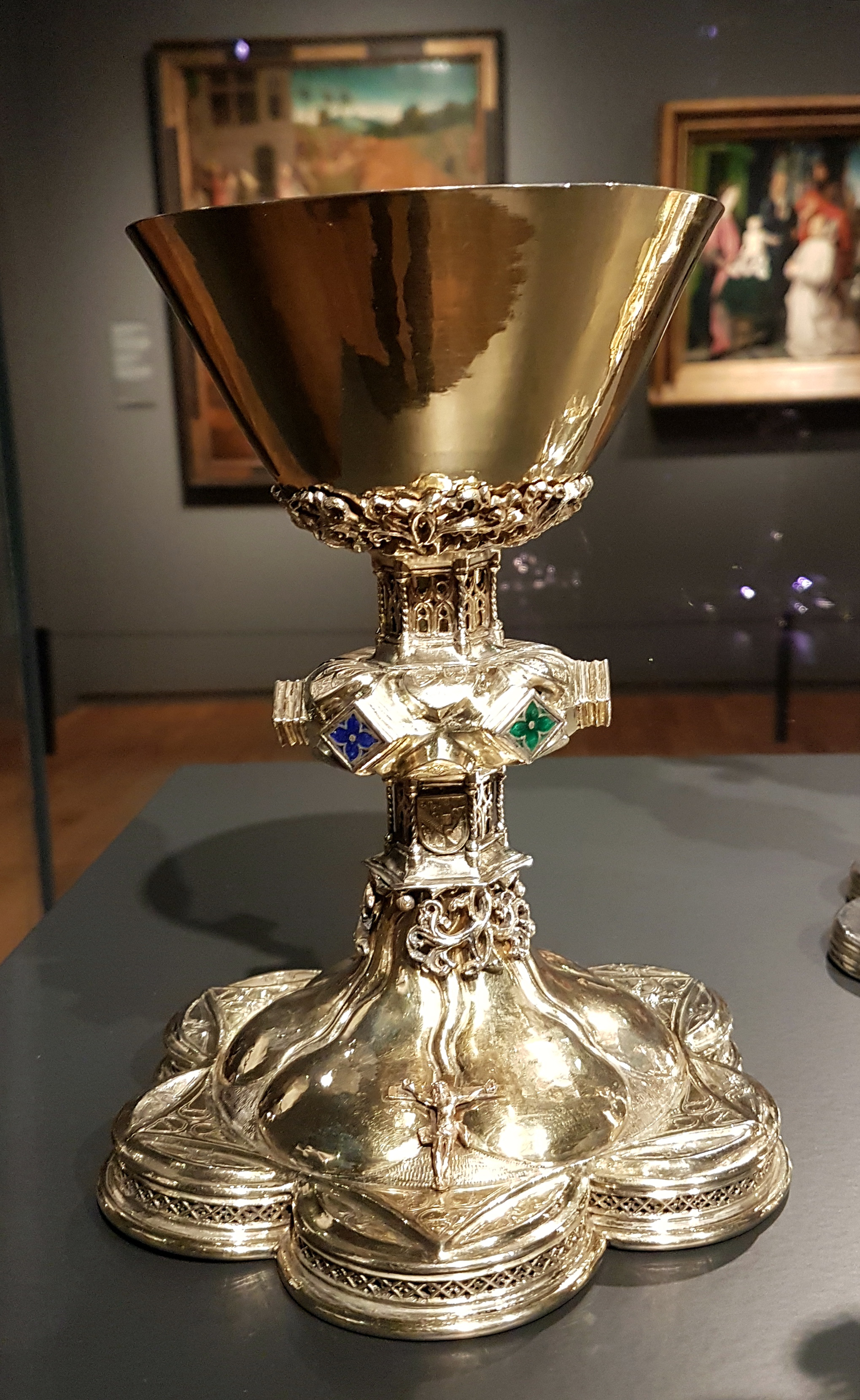
An early-16th-century chalice originally made for a canon of St John the Evangelist, Liège

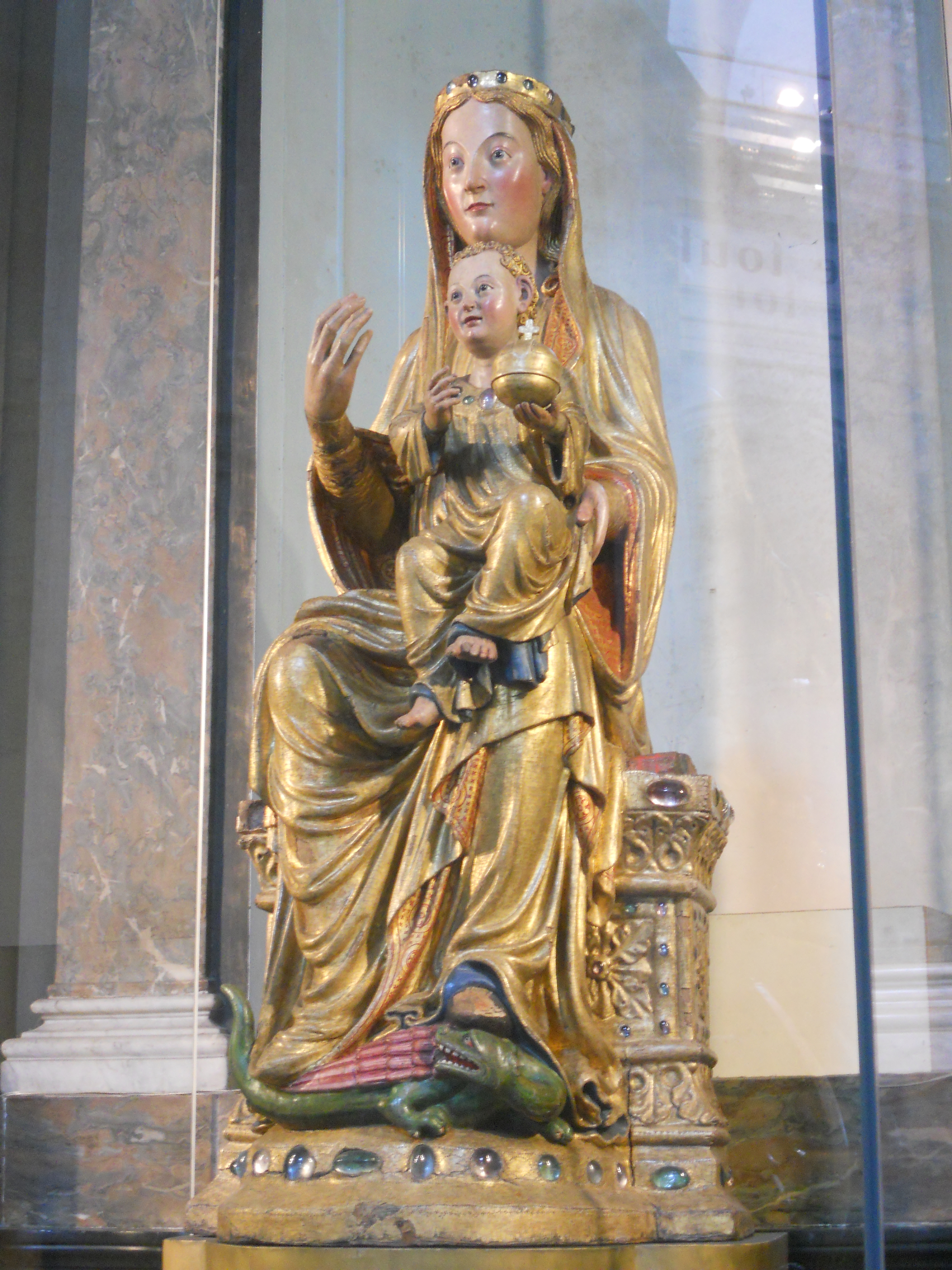
A 13th-century Virgin and Child titled “Sedes Sapientiae” enshrined within.

The church maintained a library from 1388.

The Renaissance composer Johannes Brassart was closely associated with the church.

== See also ==
- Seven collegiate churches of Liège
- Early medieval domes
