= Antoine Ansiaux =

Belgian painter (1764–1840)

Jean Joseph Eleonora Antoine Ansiaux
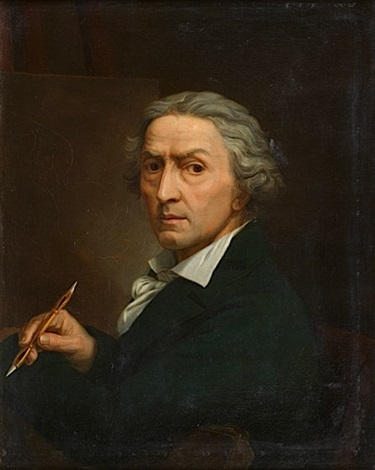
- Autoportrait, 1796
- Born: 1764; Liège, Belgium
- Died: 1840 (aged 75–76); Paris, France

Jean Joseph Eleonora Antoine Ansiaux (1764–1840) was an Austrian Netherlands-born historical and portrait painter who worked in France.

== Life ==
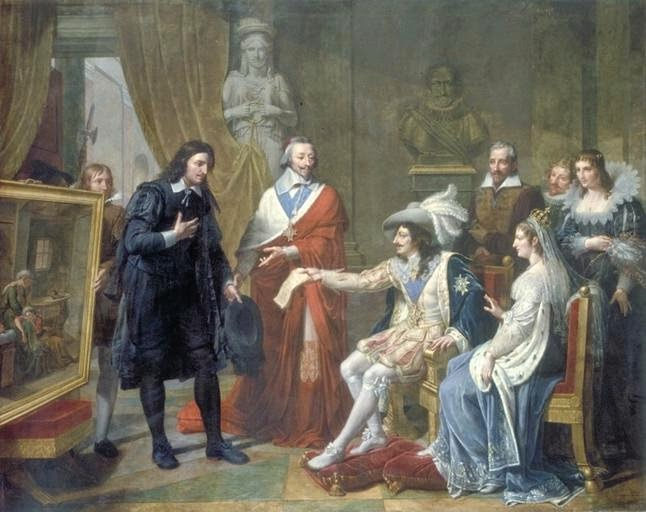
Cardinal Richelieu presenting Poussin to Louis XIII, 1817

Ansiaux, a pupil of François-André Vincent, was born in Liège, Belgium, in 1764.

His elder brother, Emmanuel Antoine Joseph Ansiaux (1761–1800), worked in politics and law, a pathway the younger Ansiaux was to have taken before turning to art.

His works, taken from sacred and profane history, and poetical subjects, are numerous. He also painted portraits of several distinguished persons, ministers, and generals of Napoleon I.

He was known for working in the Romantic-inspired Troubadour style of French historical painting. The Grove Dictionary of Art criticized his works done in this style, calling them "very uneven" and "often laborious."

== Death ==
Ansiaux died in Paris in 1840.

== Works ==
His works include:

- Angers. Cathedral: Raising of the Cross, 1827.
- Arras. Cathedral: Resurrection
- Bordeaux. Museum: Richelieu presenting Poussin to Louis XIII, 1817.
- Le Mans. Cathedral: Adoration of the Kings.
- Liège Cathedral: Ascension, 1812 and Conversion of St. Paul, 1814.
- Liège, Hôtel-de-Ville: Return of the Prodigal Son, 1819.
- Lille. Museum: St. John rebuking Herod, 1822 and finding of Moses, 1822.
- Metz. Cathedral: The Flagellation.
- Paris, S. Etienne-du-Mont: St. Paul preaching at Athens.

== Gallery ==
Selected works by Antoine Ansiaux
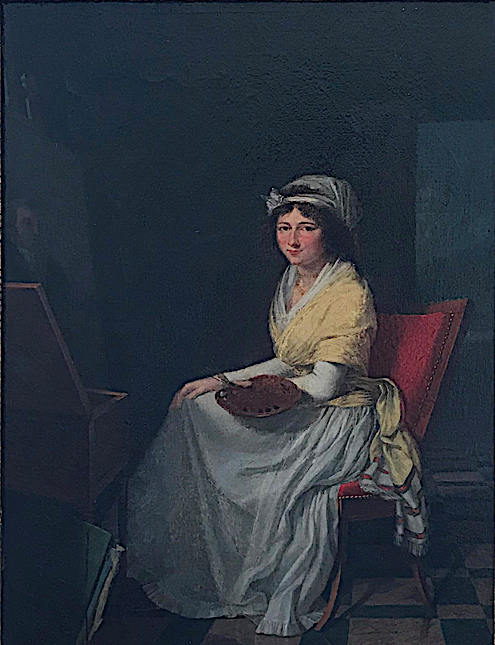
Portrait de Constance Charpentier Huile sur toile, c. 1800

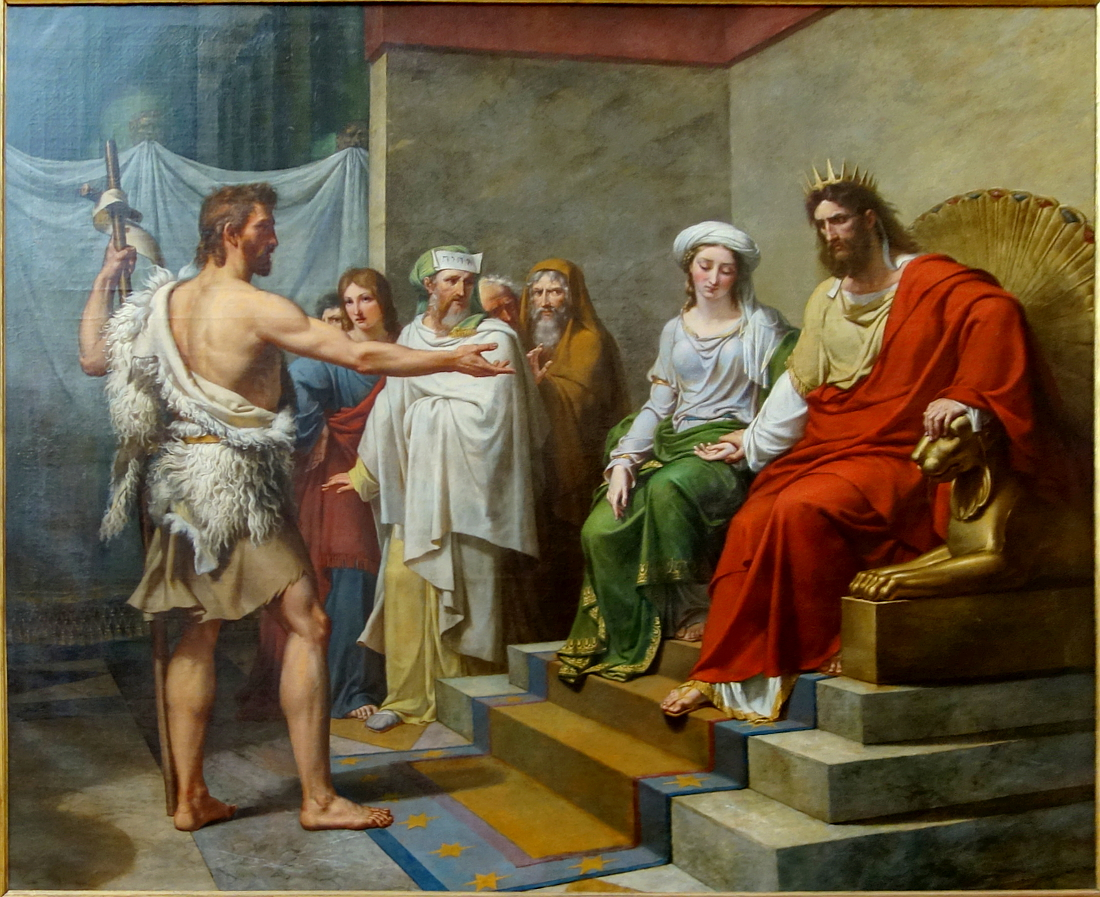
Saint Jean-Baptiste faisant des reproches à Hérode, 1822

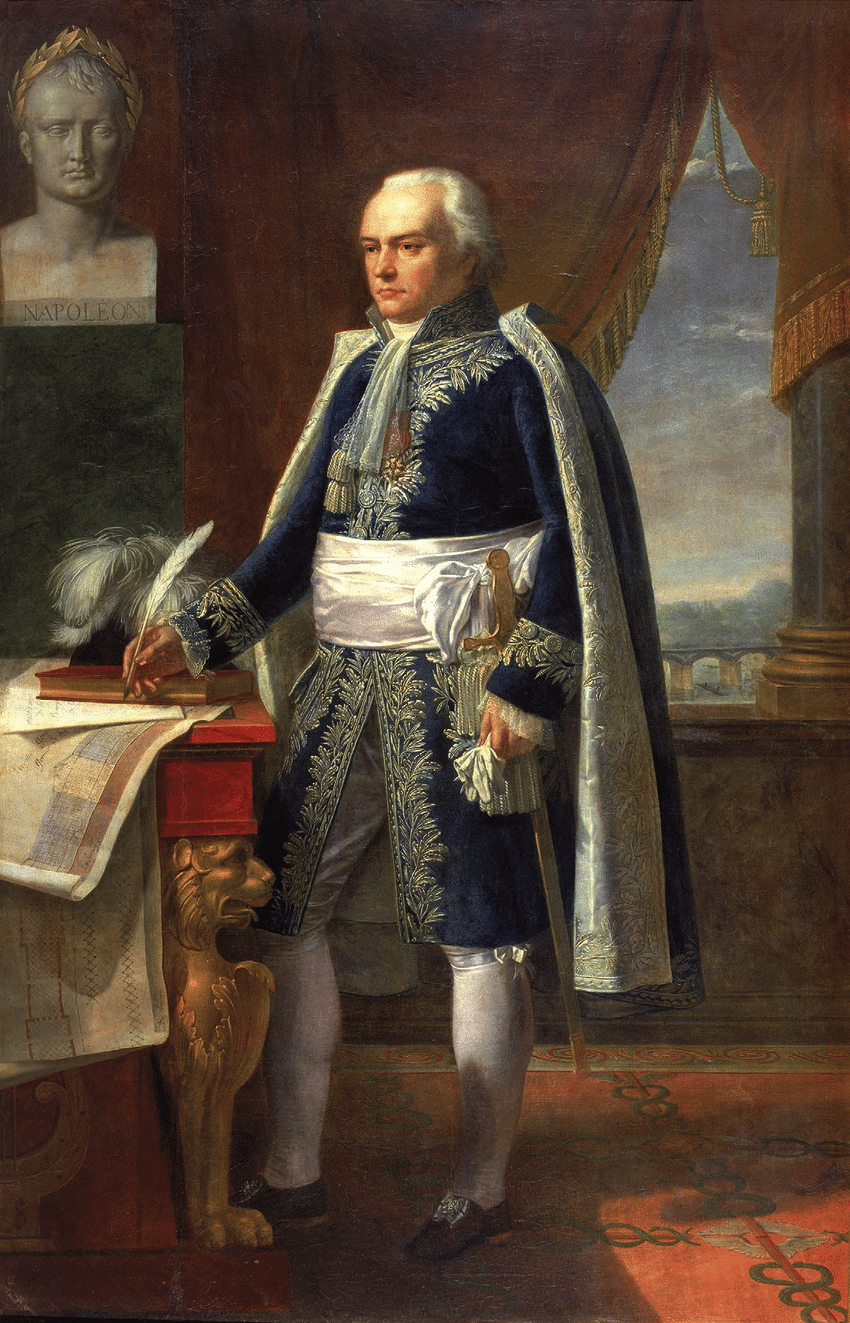
Emmanuel Crétet, comte de Champmol (1747-1809), 1810

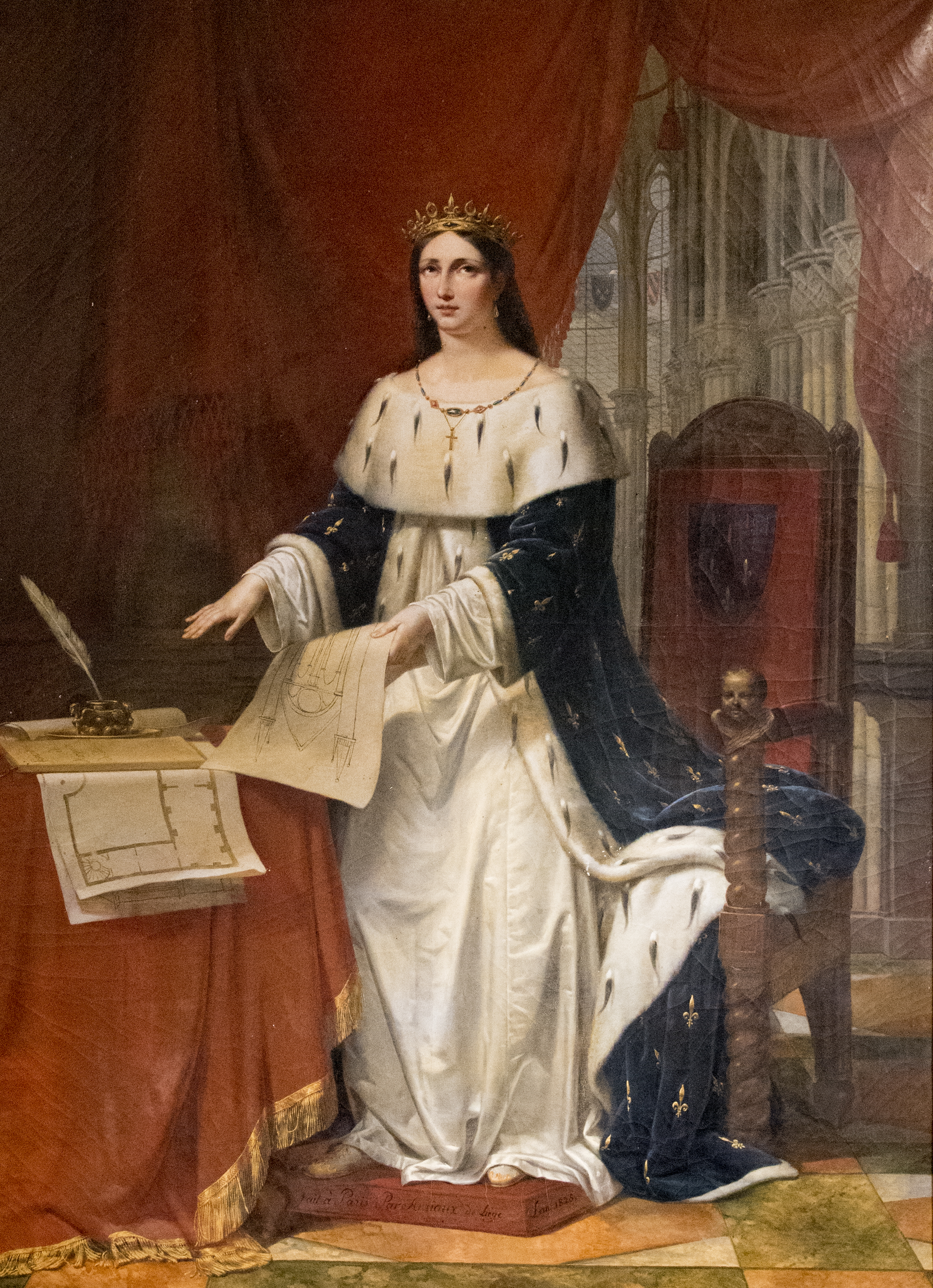
Margaretha van Bourgondië, gravin van Tonnerre, c. 19th century

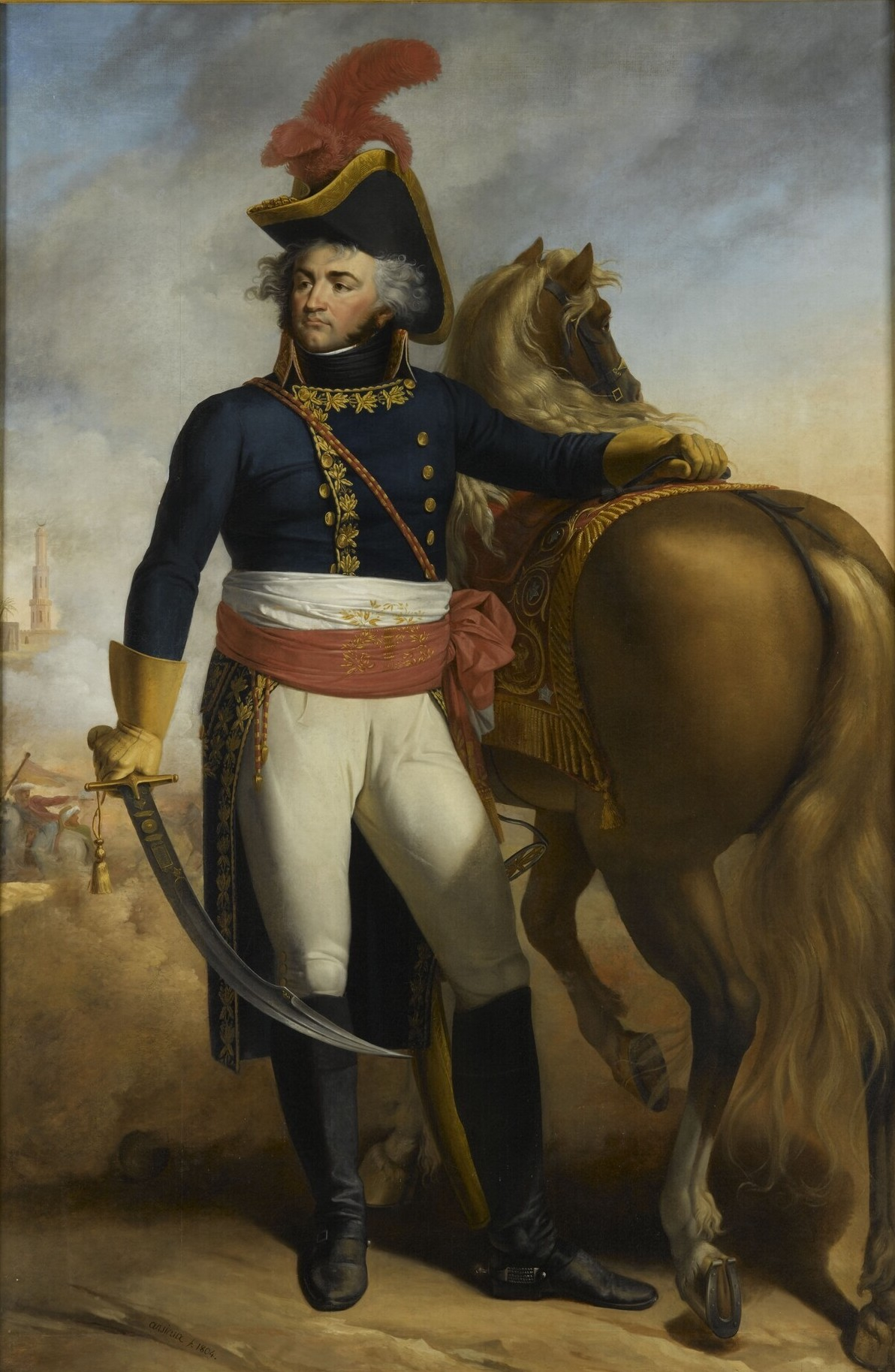
Portrait du général français Jean-Baptiste Kléber, général en chef de l'Armée d'Orient (1753-1800), 1804

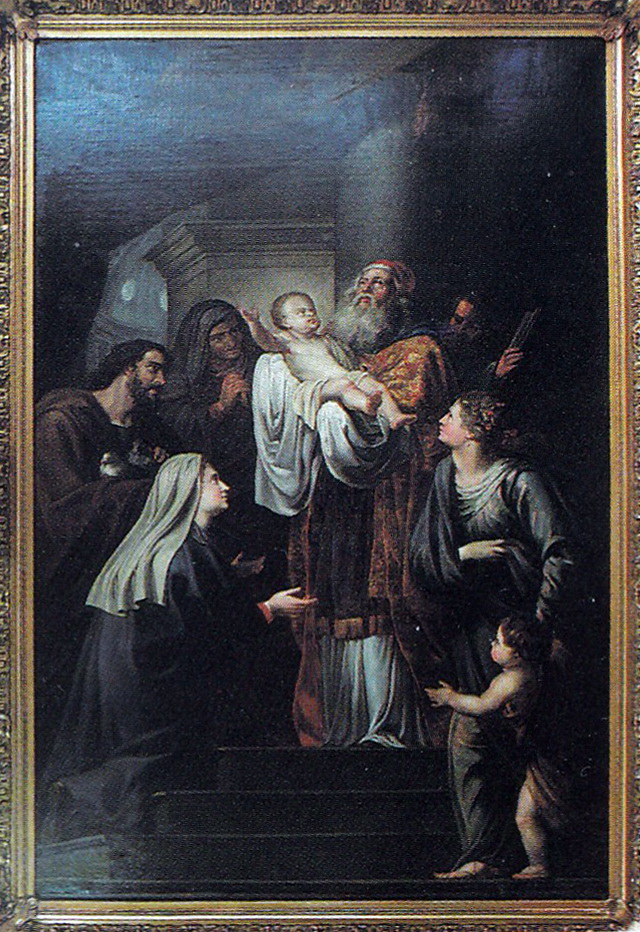
Presentation of Christ in the Temple, 1785

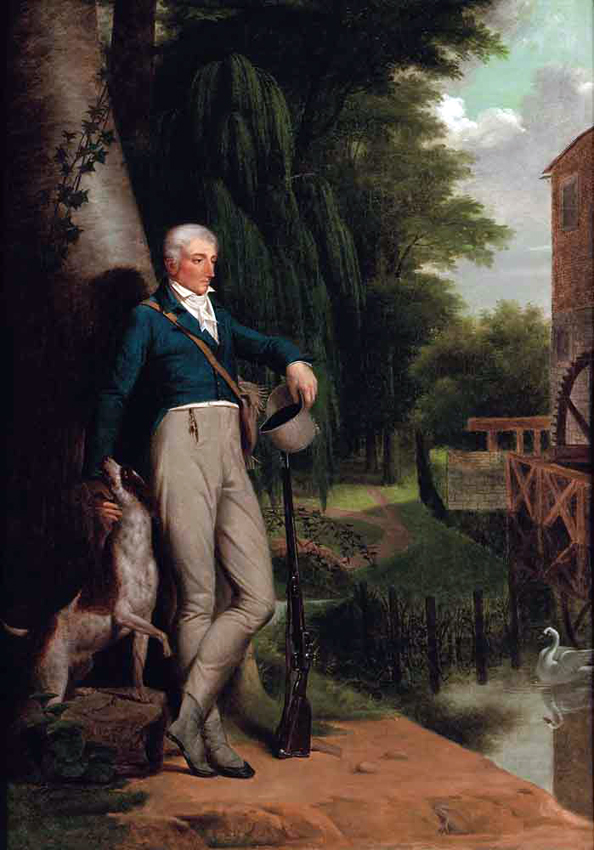
Portrait of Michel-Laurent de Sélys-Longchamps, Belgian politician, date unknown; now in the collection of the University of Liège
