= Collegiate Church of St Denis, Liège =

Church of St. Denis
- Collégiale Saint-Denis en Liège
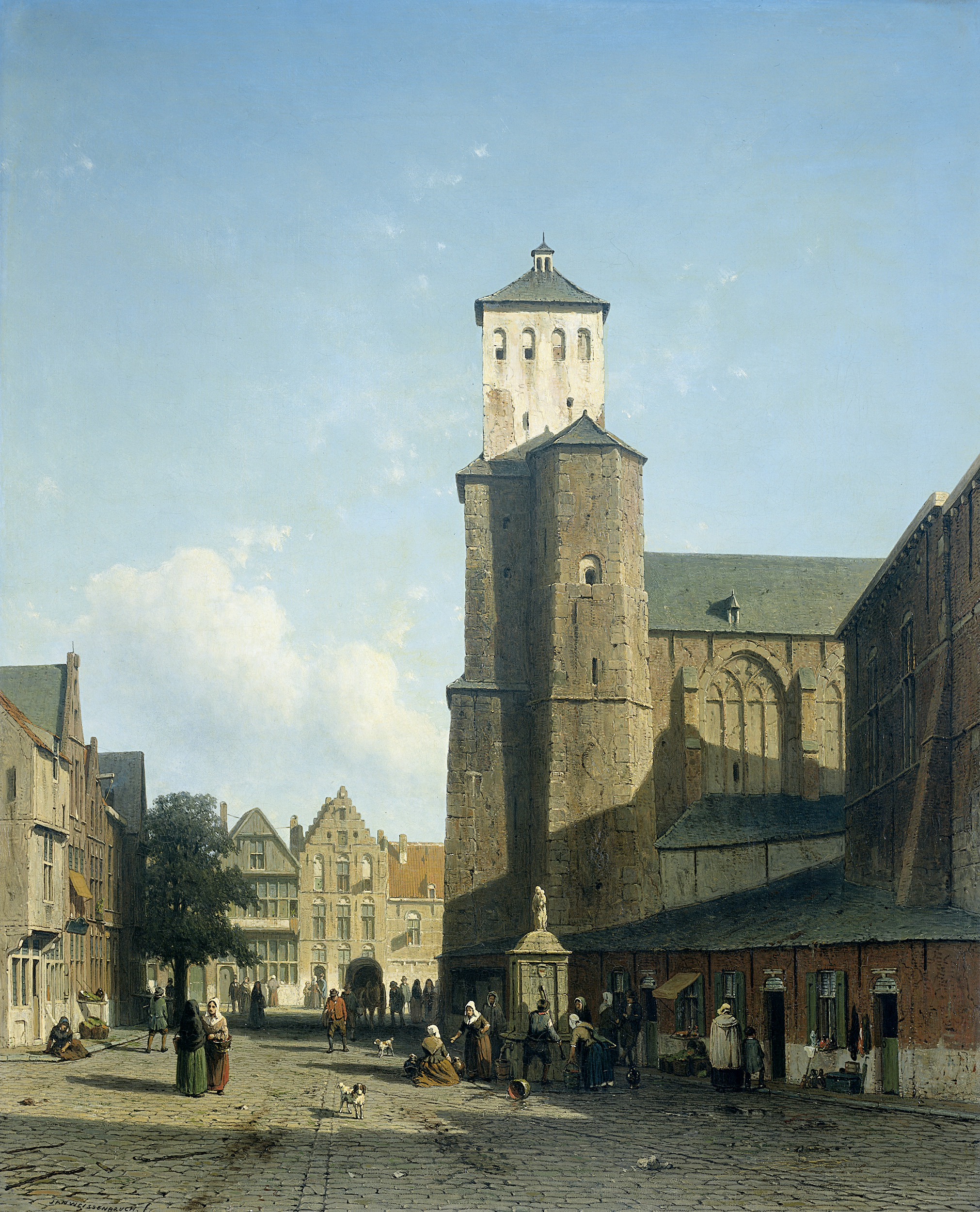
- Jan Weissenbruch, The Church of St. Denis in Liège (about 1850-1860)

- Location within Belgium
- 50°38′34.57″N 5°34′28.51″E
- Location: Place Saint-Denis, Liège
- Country: Belgium
- Denomination: Catholic Church
- Website: www.upsl.be/communautes/paroissiales/saint-denis/

History
- Founded: 978
- Founder: Notker of Liège
- Consecrated: 12 March 990

Architecture
- Functional status: parish church
- Heritage designation: Patrimoine exceptionnel
- Designated: 1936
- Style: Romanesque

Administration
- Diocese: Diocese of Liège
- Parish: Unité pastorale Saint-Lambert

Clergy
- Bishop: Jean-Pierre Delville

The Collegiate Church of St. Denis (French: Collégiale Saint-Denis) is a Roman Catholic parish church in Liège, Belgium. The fortified building was designed to be part of the city's defences. It was founded by Notker of Liège in 987 and first consecrated on 12 March 990. The tower was added around 1100.

== History ==
The Church of St Denis originally had the status of collegiate church. It was one of the seven collegiate churches of Liège, which until the Liège Revolution of 1789 collectively comprised the "secondary clergy" in the First Estate of the Prince-bishopric of Liège. The church was suppressed in 1797, but the building was taken into use as a parish church in 1803.

The church has since 1936 been included on a heritage register, and is currently listed as "exceptional heritage" of Wallonia.
