= St. Martin's Basilica, Liège =

Roman Catholic basilica in Liège, Belgium

Coordinates: 50°38′39″N 5°33′50″E

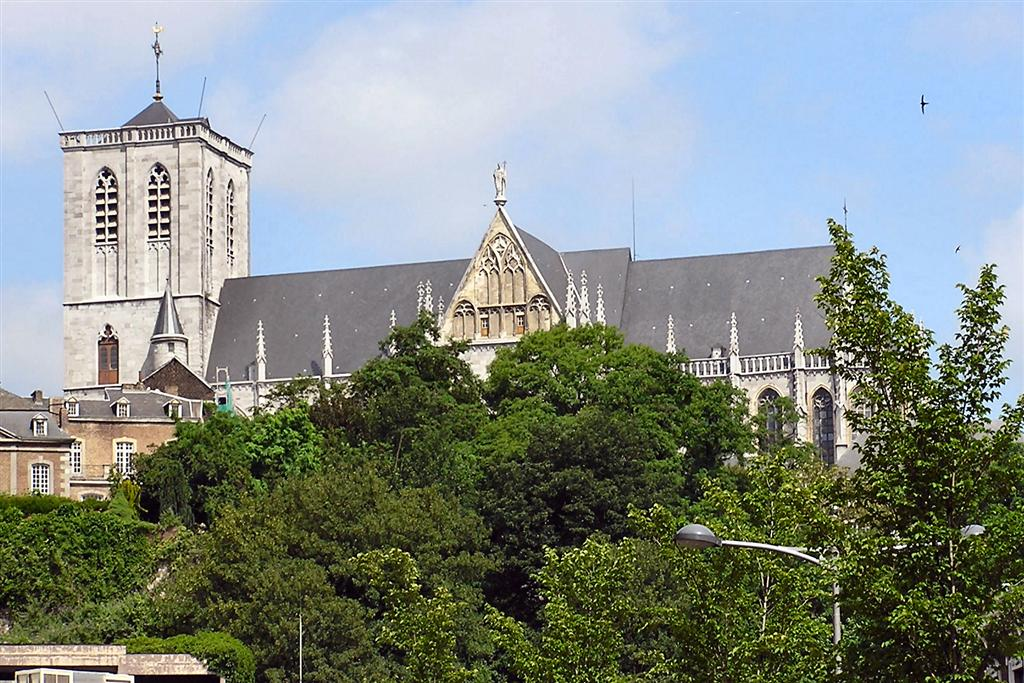
St. Martin's Basilica

St. Martin's Basilica (French: Basilique Saint-Martin) is a Roman Catholic basilica situated on the Publémont hill in the city centre of Liège, Belgium. It was initially built as a Romanesque structure in the 10th century, which in 1246 held the first celebration of an annual 'Fête-Dieu', the festival later known as Corpus Christi. This structure was replaced by a Gothic building in the 16th century. Up until the Liège Revolution, it was one of the seven collegiate churches of Liège.

In 1846, the church commissioned composer Felix Mendelssohn's Lauda Sion, Op. 43 to celebrate the feast of Corpus Christi's 600th anniversary. In 1886, it was promoted to the rank of minor basilica.

== Sources ==
- http://fr.structurae.de/structures/data/?ID=s0056128
- http://www.upsaintmartin.be/medias/files/visite-guidee-de-la-basilique-st-martin-liege-1.pdf
