= Collegiate Church of St Peter, Liège =

Church in Liège, Belgium

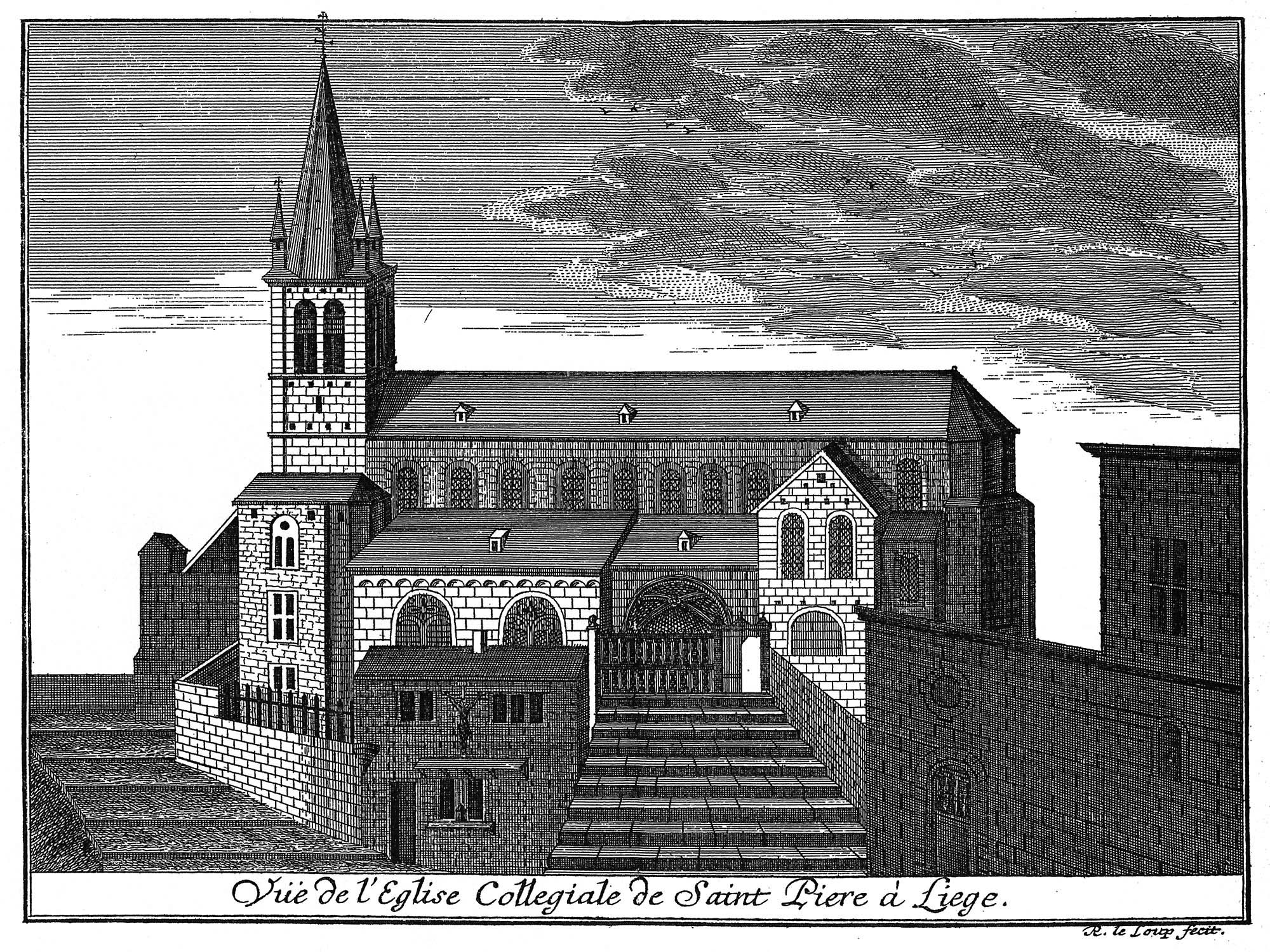
Engraving of the church by Remacle Leloup, 1735.

The Collegiate Church of St. Peter (French: Collégiale Saint-Pierre) was a Roman Catholic church in Liège, modern-day Belgium. It was founded in 712 by bishop Hubertus on the site of a Merovingian cemetery (the latter was rediscovered in the 19th century) and construction began that same year. Intending it as a monastery church, the bishop also built a cloister and brought in 15 monks from Stavelot Abbey. On his death in 727, the church's crypt became Hubert's first resting place, before his body was moved to Andage (now Saint-Hubert) in the Ardennes.

The Vikings destroyed the original church in 914 and a new one was built and consecrated in 931. In 945, it was made a collegiate church with 30 secular canons. It was damaged by fire in 1185, but eleven years later had recovered enough to host a synod. It was finally closed in 1797 in the wake of the Liège Revolution and demolished in 1811, though the foundations of the former cloister survived until 1860.
