= Foire de Liège =

Belgian festival

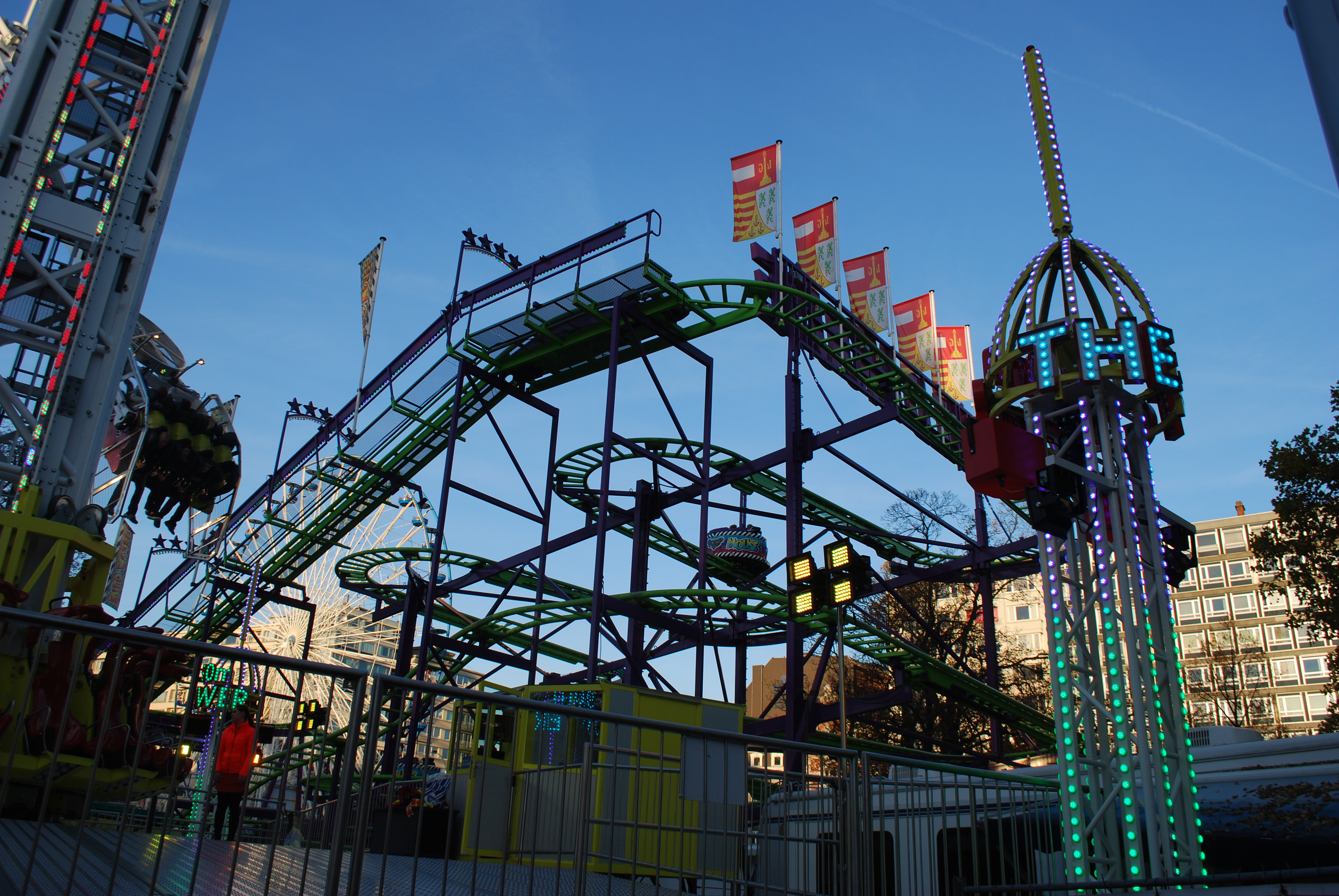
- The Tower
- Native name: Foire de Liège
- English name: Liège Fair
- Time: Autumn
- Duration: 1 month
- Location: Liège, Belgium

The Liège Fair (French: Foire de Liège or Foire d'octobre; "October Fair"), founded in 1594, is the oldest Belgian kermesse still celebrated today. It originally started in November but since 1871 has started in October. It is also the largest funfair in Belgium in terms of the number of stallholders taking part, with more than 170 rides and food facilities. The total length of all the stalls is about two kilometres.

In the 21st century, its number of visitors has exceeded 1.5 million annually.

== History ==
Although the first texts mentioning the existence of a fair in Liège, indicating the details of the organisation and listing the entertainments, only date back to the 14th century, its existence probably goes back to the origins of the city, in other words in the 8th century.

In 1350, under the episcopacy of prince-bishop Engelbert de La Marck, the Chapter of Saint Lambert's Cathedral, Liège and the city magistrates decided to bring together the two existing fairs in a single fair located in Outremeuse at the place called "En Gravioule" which was then outside the city. This fair was dedicated to St Lambert and lasted a week starting from 17 September.

In 1594, Prince-Bishop Ernest of Bavaria founded a new annual fair, lasting for two weeks from 28 October, in honour of St Simon and St Jude. The fair took place on La Batte.

In 1663, Prince-Bishop Maximilian Henry of Bavaria transferred the river port's weekly horse market from the Place aux chevaux (now Place de la république française) to La Batte. From 1687, the fair of Saint Simon and Saint Jude supplanted all other fairs. It would take place each year at the same time and the same place for nearly two centuries.

In 1854, following the construction of the quays on the Meuse, especially including the reconstruction of the Pont des Arches, the fair was forced to move from La Batte to the new boulevard d'Avroy, created in 1835. What was to have been a temporary location, proved to be the definitive location.
