= Liège =

Capital of Liège province, Wallonia, Belgium

Liège: Lîdje (Walloon); Luik (Dutch); Lüttich (German)
- City and municipality
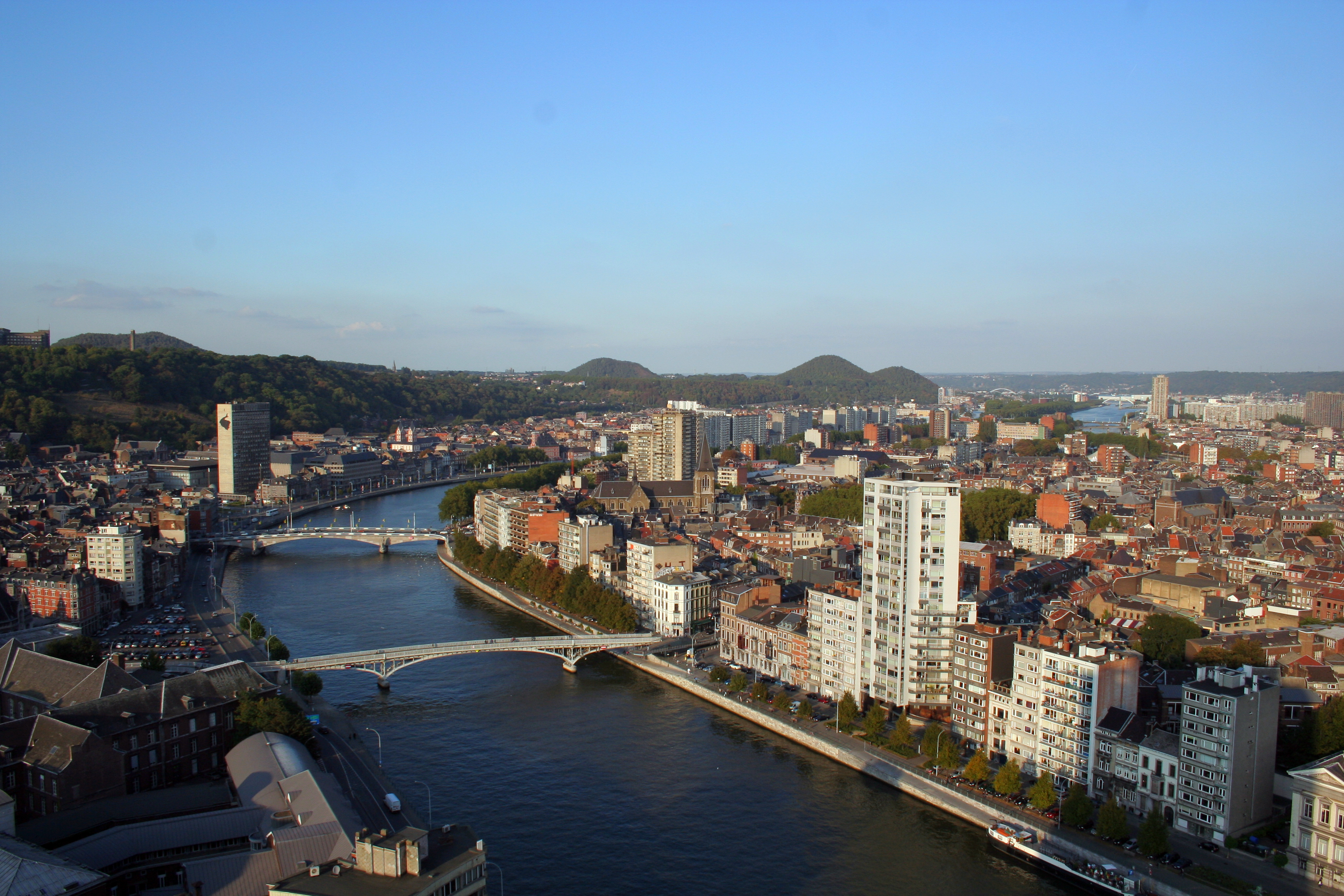
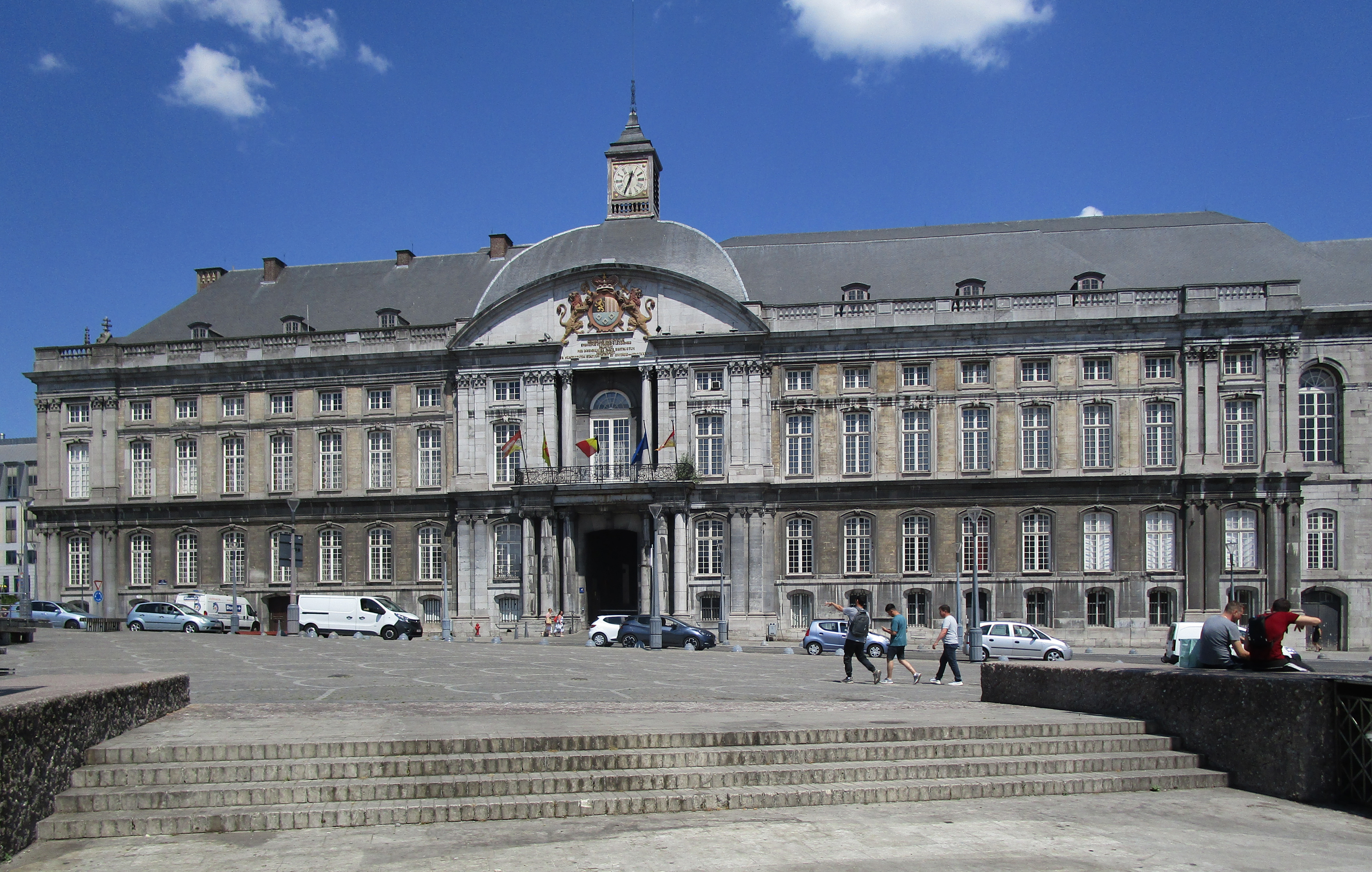
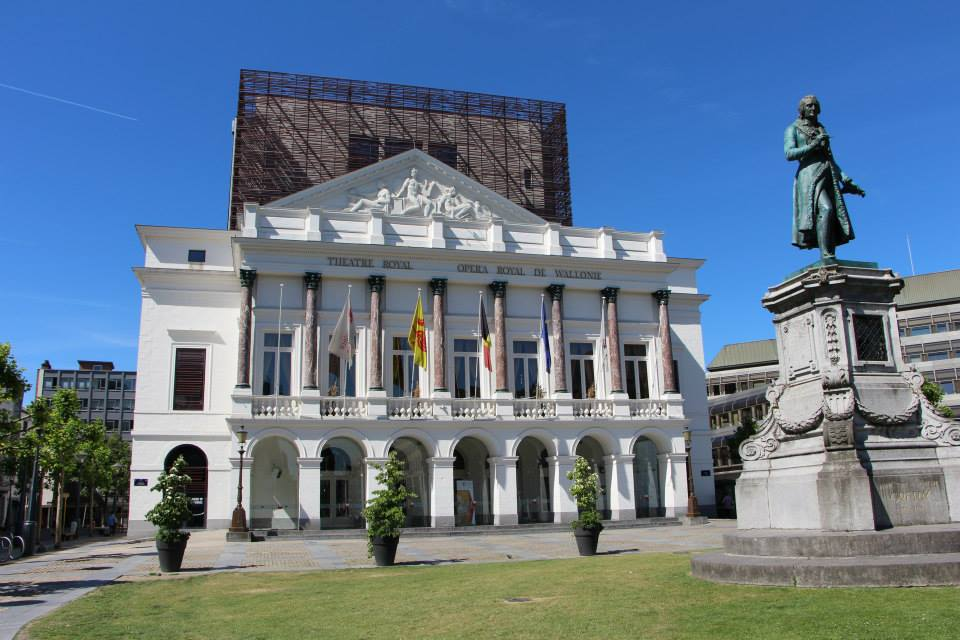
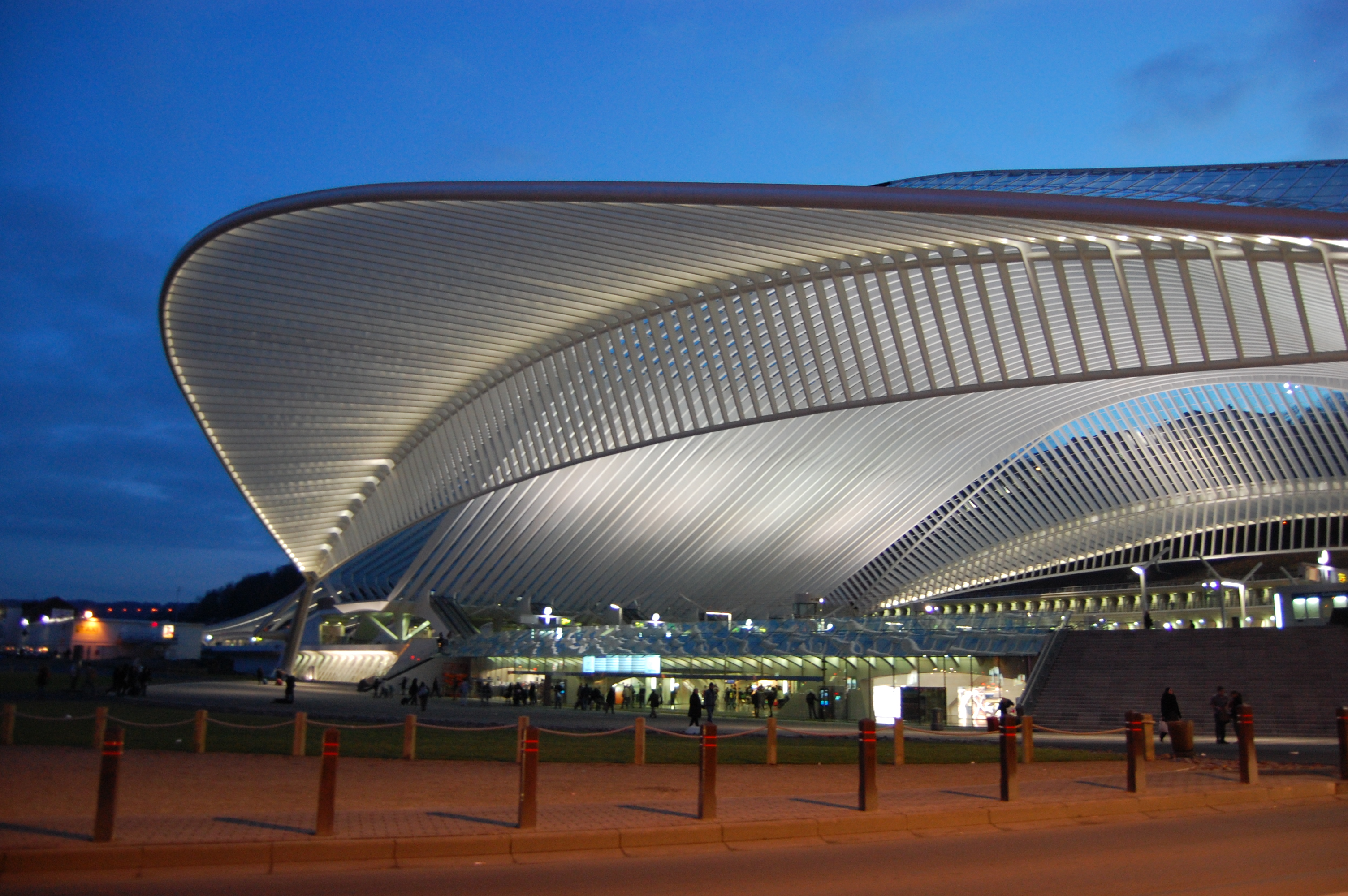
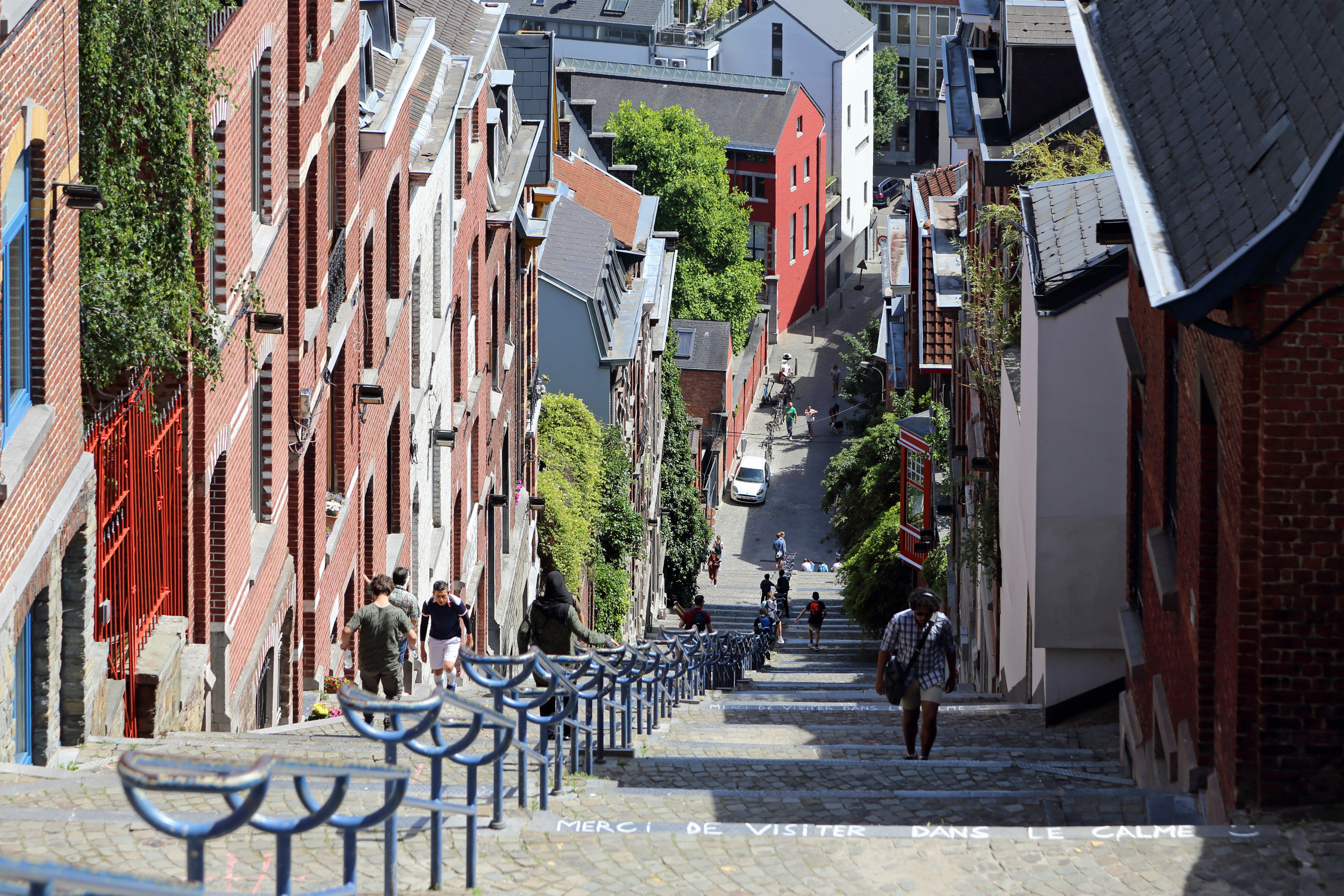
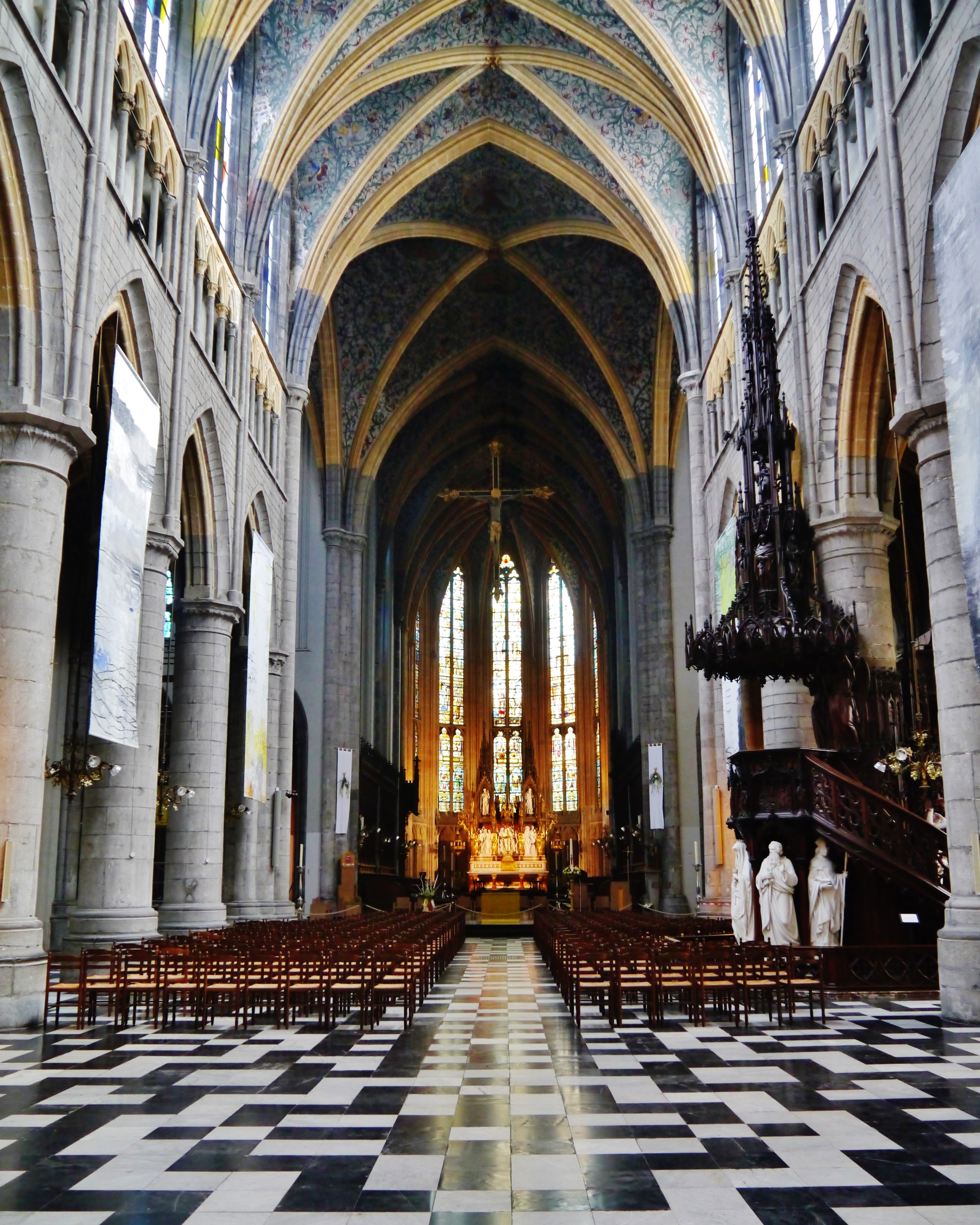
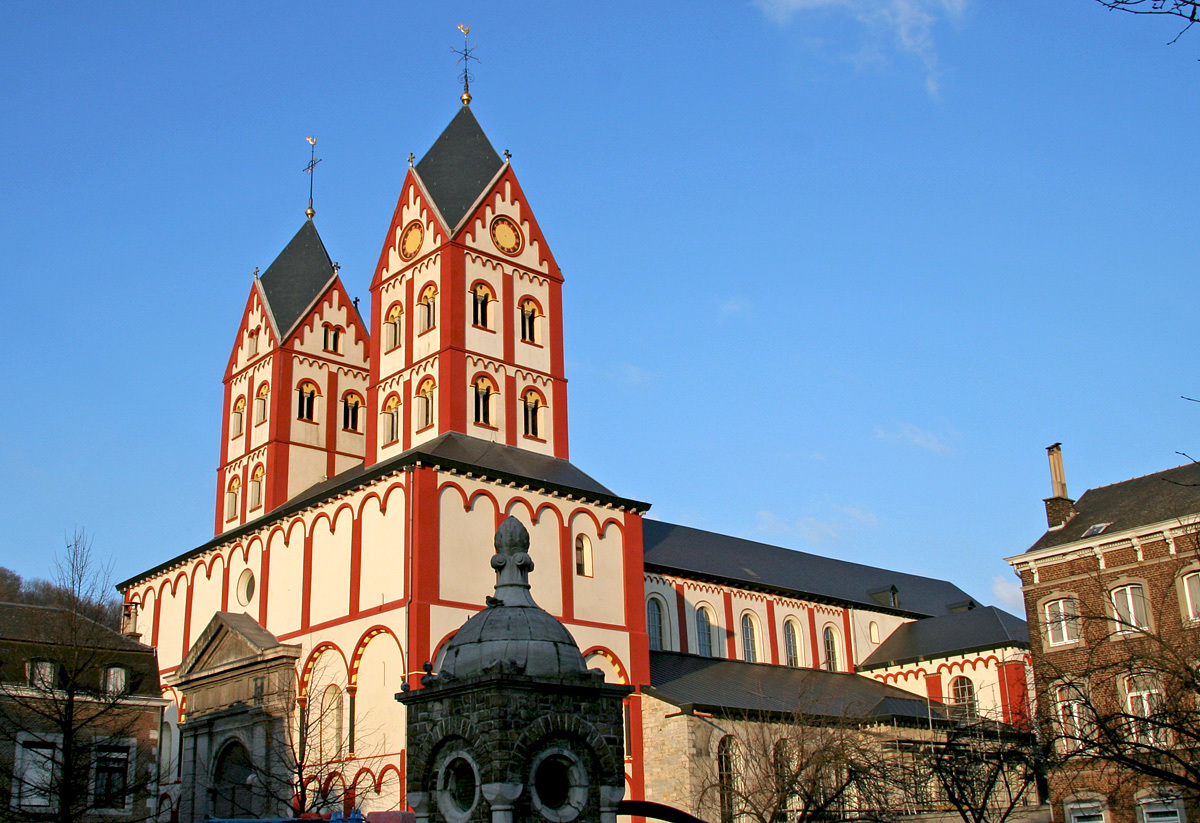
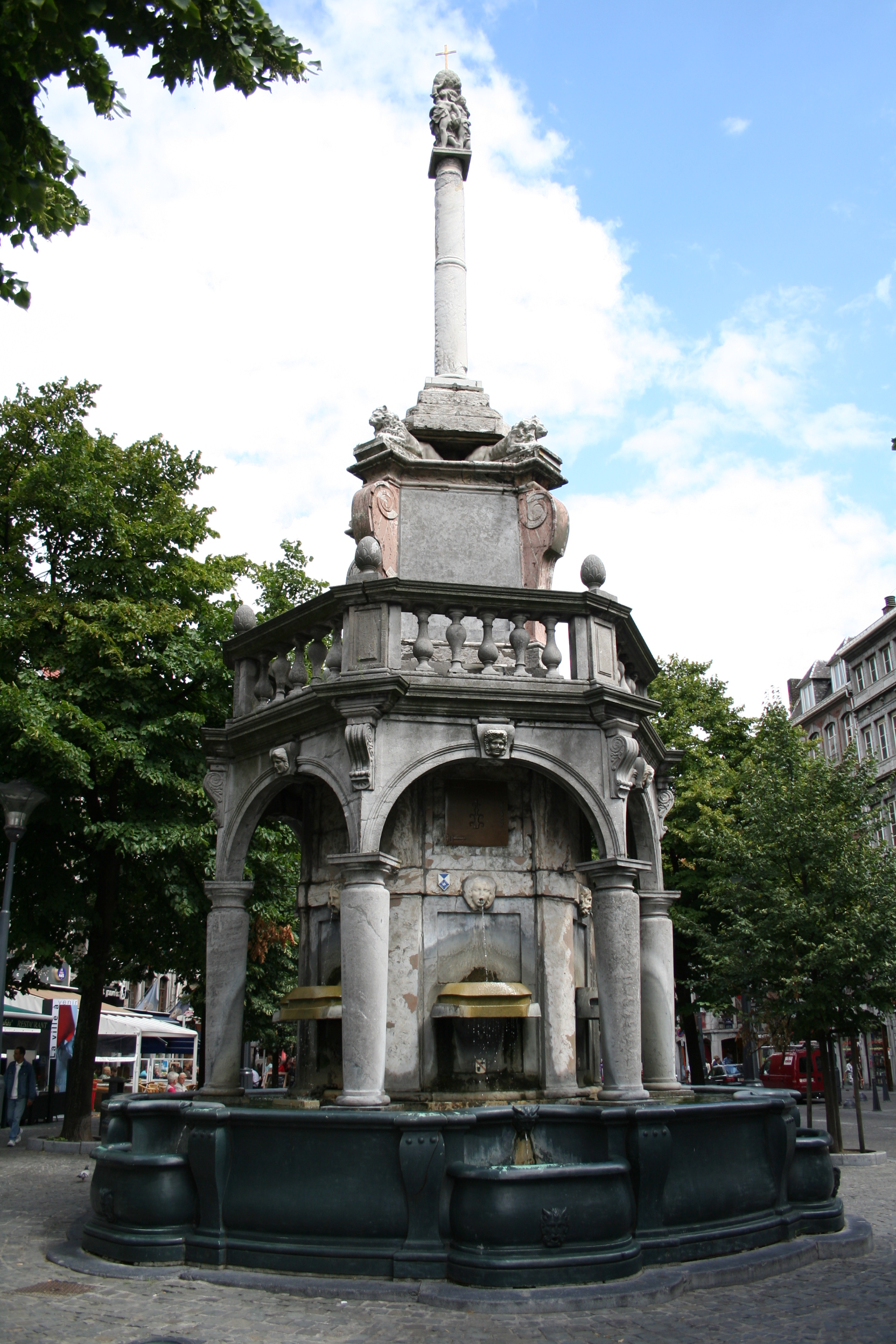
- Liège skyline on the river Meuse Prince-Bishops' Palace Opéra Royal de Wallonie Liège-Guillemins Montagne de Bueren Saint Paul's Cathedral Collegiate Church of St. Bartholomew Perron of Liège

- Flag Coat of arms

- The municipality of Liège in the province of Liège
- Interactive map of Liège
- Location in Belgium
- Coordinates: 50°38′23″N 05°34′14″E
- Country: Belgium
- Community: French Community
- Region: Wallonia
- Province: Liège
- Arrondissement: Liège

Government
  - Mayor: Willy Demeyer (PS)
  - Governing party: PS – MR

Area
  - Total: 68.65 km^{2} (26.51 sq mi)

Population (2022-01-01)
  - Total: 195,278
  - Density: 2,845/km^{2} (7,367/sq mi)
- Postal codes: 4000–4032
- NIS code: 62063
- Area codes: 04
- Website: liege.be
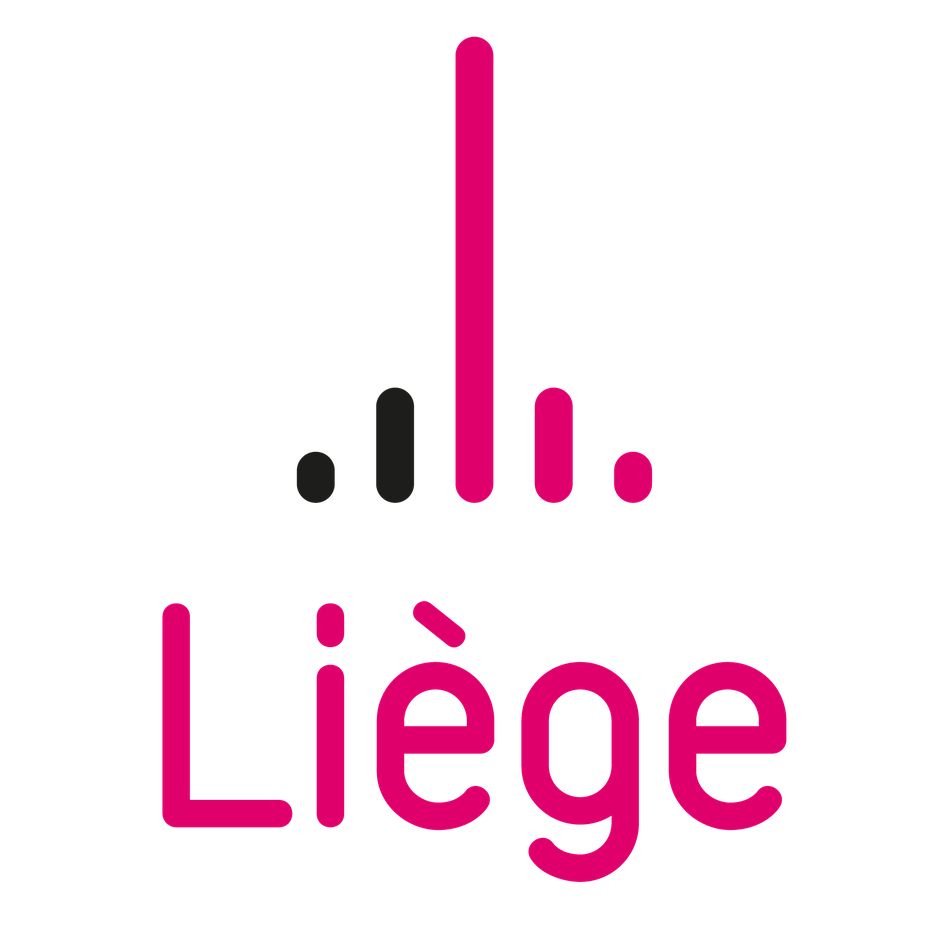
- Logo of Liège

Liège (/li.ˈɛʒ, li.ˈeɪʒ/ lee-EZH, lee-AYZH; French: [ljɛʒ]; Walloon: Lîdje [liːtʃ]; Dutch: Luik [lœyk]; German: Lüttich [ˈlʏtɪç]) is a city and municipality in the Belgian region of Wallonia, and the capital of the eponymous province. The city is situated in the valley of the Meuse, in the east of Belgium, not far from borders with the Netherlands (Maastricht is about 33 km (20.5 mi) to the north) and Germany (Aachen is about 53 km (32.9 mi) north-east). In Liège, the Meuse meets the river Ourthe. The city is part of the sillon industriel, the former industrial backbone of Wallonia. It is still the principal economic and cultural centre of the region.

The municipality consists of the following sections (sub-municipalities): Liège proper, Angleur, Bressoux, Chênée, Glain, Grivegnée, Jupille-sur-Meuse, Rocourt, and Wandre. In January 2026, Liège had 198,102 inhabitants. The metropolitan area, including the outer commuter zone, covers an area of 1,879 km^{2} (725 sq mi) and had a total population of 749,110 on 1 January 2008. This includes a total of 52 municipalities, such as Herstal and Seraing. Liège ranks as the third most populous urban area in Belgium, after Brussels and Antwerp, and the fourth most populous municipality after Antwerp, Ghent and Charleroi. The city is part of the Euregio Meuse-Rhine.

== Etymology ==
The name is of Germanic origin and is reconstructible as *liudik-, from the Germanic word *liudiz "people", which is found in for example Dutch lui(den), lieden, Polish ludzie, Czech lidé, German Leute, Old English lēod (English lede), Icelandic lýður ("people"), Latvian ļaudis ("people"), Lithuanian liaudis ("people"). It is found in Ukrainian as liudy ("people"), in Russian as люди, romanised: lyudi ("people"), in Latin as Leodicum or Leodium, and in Middle Dutch as ludic or ludeke.

Until 17 September 1946, the city's name was written Liége, with the acute accent instead of a grave accent. This change is in conformity with changes in spelling other words from -ége to -ège (e. g. collège), which was made in the seventh edition of the Dictionnaire de l'Académie française (1878) to reflect a change in the pronunciation from the closed vowel [e] to the open vowel [ɛ]. This official change did not extend to the demonym, which persists as Liégeois/Liégeoise.

In French, Liège is associated with the epithet la cité ardente ("the fervent city"). This term, which emerged around 1905, originally referred to the city's history of rebellions against Burgundian rule, but was appropriated to refer to its economic dynamism during the Industrial Revolution.

== History ==
=== Early Middle Ages ===
Although settlements already existed in Roman times, the first references to Liège are from 558, when it was known as Vicus Leudicus. Around 705, Saint Lambert of Maastricht is credited with completing the Christianization of the region, indicating that up to the early 8th century the religious practices of antiquity had survived in some form. Christian conversion may still not have been quite universal, since Lambert was murdered in Liège and thereafter regarded as a martyr for his faith. To enshrine St. Lambert's relics, his successor, Hubertus (later to become St. Hubert), built a basilica near the bishop's residence which became the true nucleus of the city.

A few centuries later, the city became the capital of a prince-bishopric, which lasted from 985 till 1794. The first prince-bishop, Notger, transformed the city into a major intellectual and ecclesiastical centre, which maintained its cultural importance during the Middle Ages. Pope Clement VI recruited several musicians from Liège to perform in the Papal court at Avignon, thereby sanctioning the practice of polyphony in the religious realm. The city was renowned for its many churches, the oldest of which, St Martin's, dates from 682. Although nominally part of the Holy Roman Empire, in practice it possessed a large degree of independence.

=== Late medieval and early modern periods ===
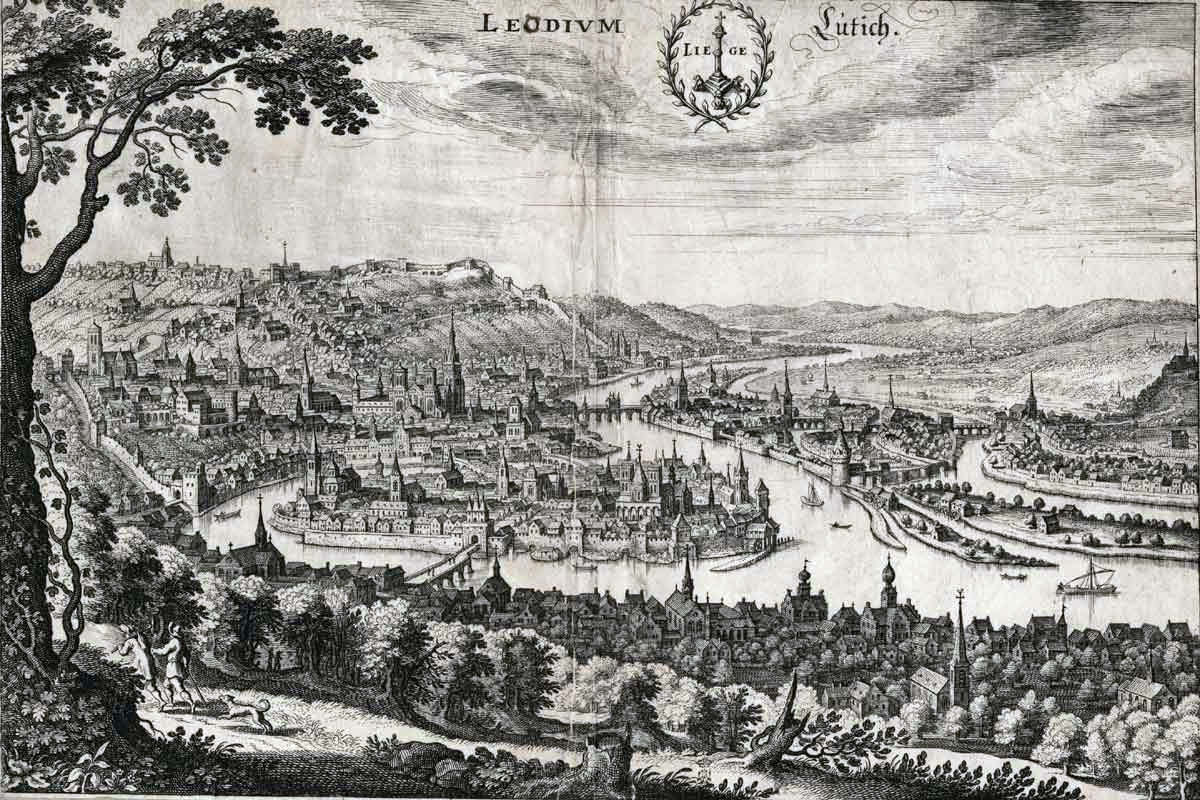
Liège in 1650

The strategic position of Liège has made it a frequent target of armies and insurgencies over the centuries. It was fortified early on with a castle on the steep hill that overlooks the city's western side. During this medieval period, three women from the Liège region made significant contributions to Christian spirituality: Elizabeth of Spalbeek, Christina the Astonishing, and Marie of Oignies.

In 1345, the citizens of Liège rebelled against Prince-Bishop Engelbert III de la Marck, their ruler at the time, and defeated him in battle near the city. Shortly after, a unique political system formed in Liège, whereby the city's 32 guilds shared sole political control of the municipal government. Each person on the register of each guild was eligible to participate, and each guild's voice was equal, making it the most democratic system that the Low Countries had ever known. The system spread to Utrecht, and left a democratic spirit in Liège that survived the Middle Ages.

At the end of the Liège Wars, a rebellion took place against rule from Burgundy. In 1468 Duke Charles the Bold of Burgundy, witnessed by King Louis XI of France, captured and largely destroyed the city after a bitter siege which was ended with a successful surprise attack. The rebellion figures prominently in the plot of Sir Walter Scott's 1823 novel Quentin Durward.

The Prince-Bishopric of Liège was technically part of the Holy Roman Empire which, after 1477, came under the rule of the Habsburgs. The reign of prince-bishop Érard de La Marck (1506–1538) coincides with the dawn of the Renaissance.

During the Counter-Reformation, the diocese of Liège was split and progressively lost its role as a regional power. By the 17th century, the bishopric of Liège became a virtual Secundogeniture of the Bavarian royal house of Wittelsbach, with second sons of the Bavarian monarch ruling as prince-bishop. Beginning with the ascension of Ernest of Bavaria in 1581, Bavarian princes ruled over Cologne, Münster, and other bishoprics in the northwest of the Holy Roman Empire in addition to Liège. Ferdinand of Bavaria (bishop) ruled from 1612 to 1650, and Maximilian Henry of Bavaria ruled from 1650 to 1688.

In 1636, during the Thirty Years' War, the city was besieged by Imperial forces under Johann von Werth from April to July. The army, mainly consisting of mercenaries, extensively and viciously plundered the surrounding bishopric during the siege.

=== 18th century to World War I ===
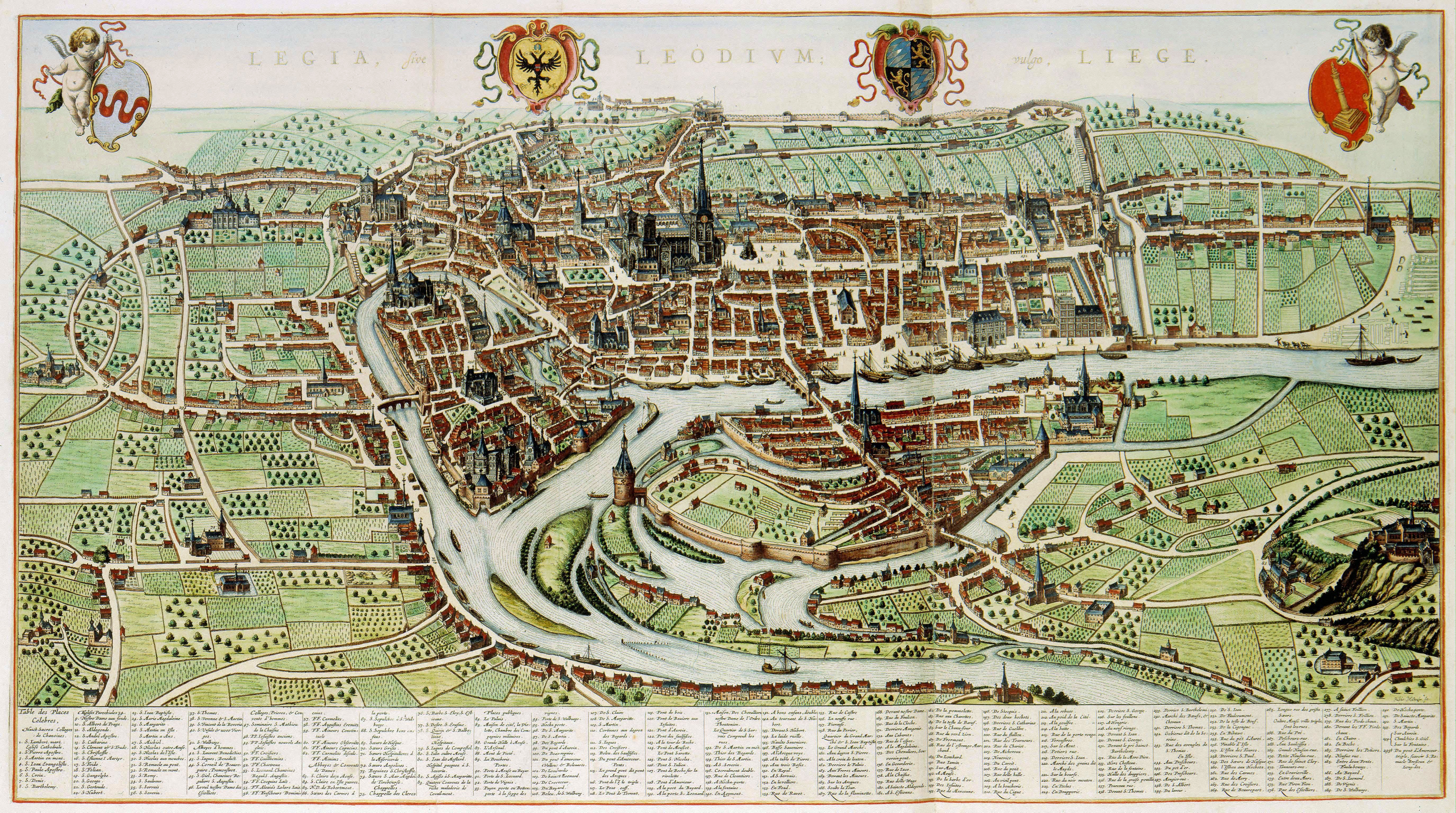
Liège in 1627

An Anglo-Dutch army under the Duke of Marlborough and Menno van Coehoorn captured the city in 1702 from the Bavarian prince-bishop and his French allies in 1702 during the War of the Spanish Succession.

In the middle of the eighteenth century the ideas of the French Encyclopédistes began to gain popularity in the region. Bishop François-Charles de Velbrück (1772–84), encouraged their propagation, thus prepared the way for the Liège Revolution which started in the episcopal city on 18 August 1789 and led to the creation of the Republic of Liège before it was invaded by counter-revolutionary forces of the Habsburg monarchy in 1791.

In the course of the 1794 campaigns of the French Revolution, the French Revolutionary Army took the city and imposed strongly anticlerical regime, destroying St. Lambert's Cathedral. The overthrow of the Prince-Bishopric of Liège was confirmed in 1801 by the Concordat co-signed by Napoléon Bonaparte and Pope Pius VII. France lost the city in 1815 when the Congress of Vienna awarded it to the United Kingdom of the Netherlands. Dutch rule lasted only until 1830, when the Belgian Revolution led to the establishment of an independent, Catholic and neutral Belgium which incorporated Liège. After this, Liège developed rapidly into a major industrial city which became one of continental Europe's first large-scale steel making centres. The Walloon Jacquerie of 1886 saw a large-scale working class revolt. No less than 6,000 regular troops were called into the city to quell the unrest, while strike spread through the whole sillon industriel.

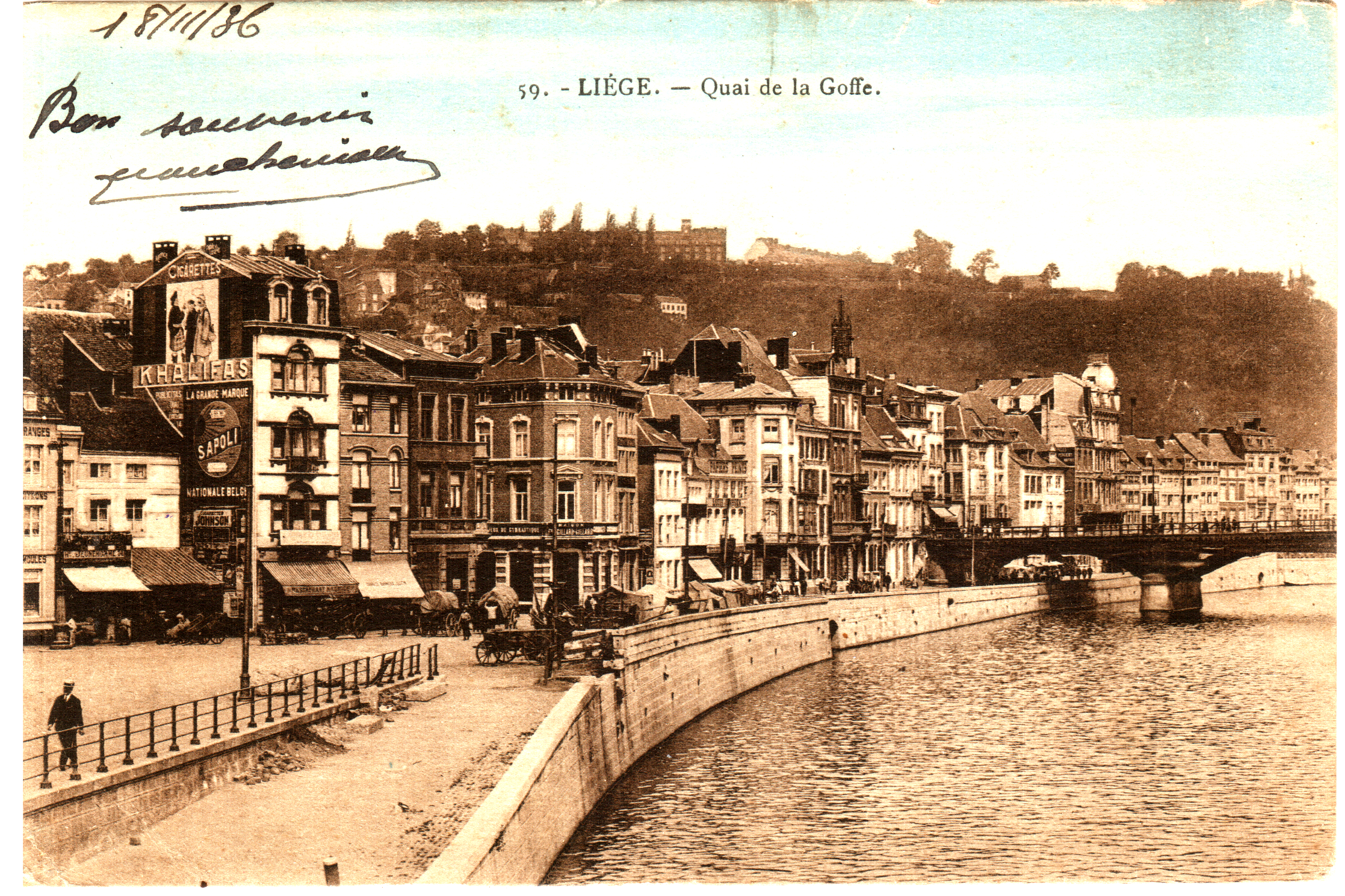
Quai de la Goffe in 1936

Liège's fortifications were redesigned by Henri Alexis Brialmont in the 1880s and a chain of twelve forts was constructed around the city to provide defence in depth. This presented a major obstacle to the Imperial German Army in 1914, whose Schlieffen Plan relied on being able to quickly pass through the Meuse valley and the Ardennes en route to France. The German invasion of Belgium on 5 August 1914 soon reached Liège, which was defended by 30,000 troops under General Gérard Leman in the Battle of Liège. The forts initially held off General Alexander von Kluck's German First Army of about 100,000 men but were pulverised into submission by a five-day bombardment by heavy artillery, including thirty-two 21 cm mortars and two German 42 cm Big Bertha howitzers. Due to faulty planning of the protection of the underground defence tunnels beneath the main citadel, one direct artillery hit caused a huge explosion, which eventually led to the surrender of the Belgian forces. The Belgian resistance was shorter than had been intended, but the twelve days of delay caused by the siege nonetheless contributed to the eventual failure of the German invasion of France. The city was subsequently occupied by the Germans until the end of the war. Liège received the Légion d'Honneur for its resistance in 1914.

As part of Chancellor Theobald von Bethmann Hollweg's Septemberprogramm, Berlin planned to annexe Liege under the name Lüttich to the German Empire in any post-war peace agreement.

=== World War II to the present ===
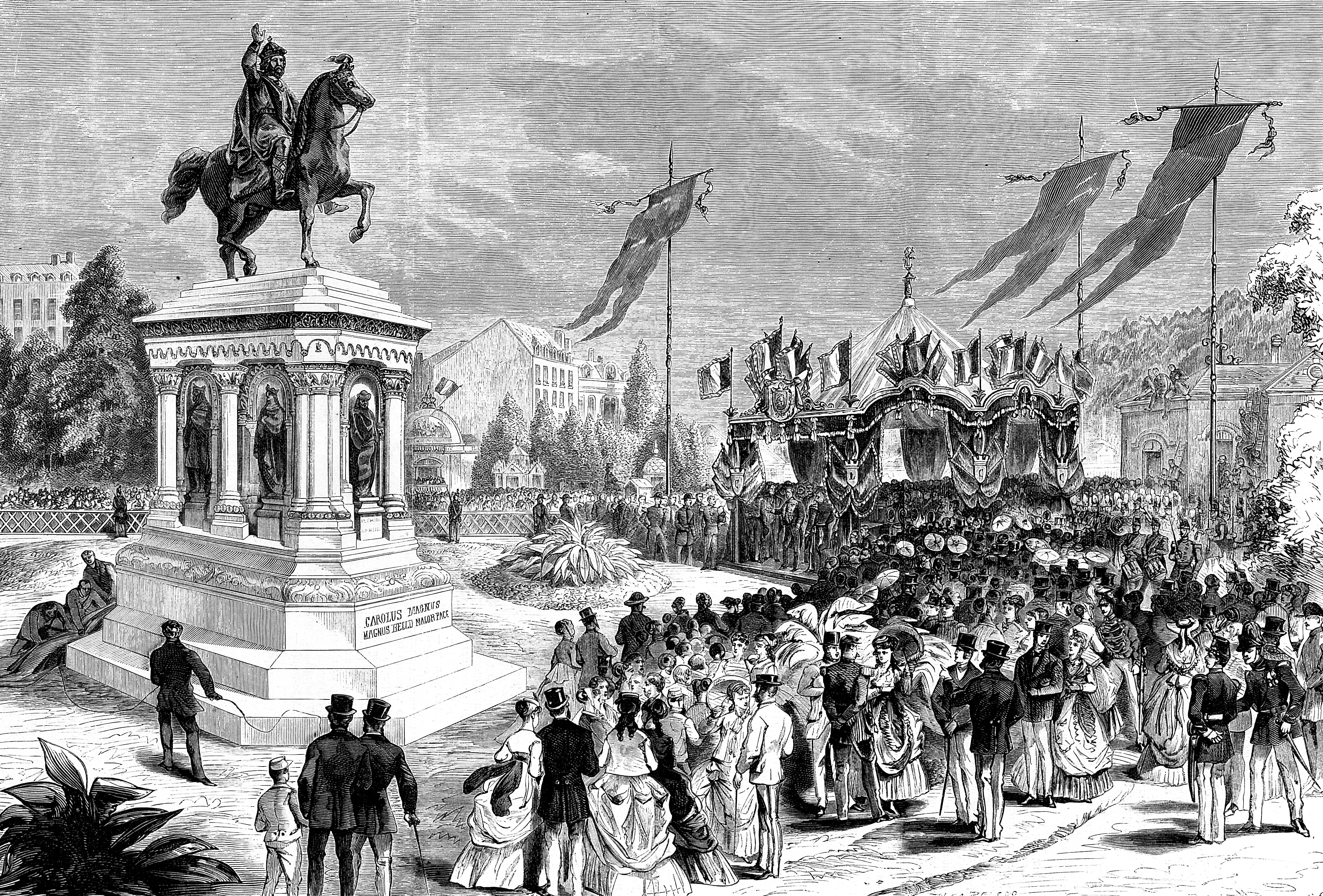
Inauguration of the statue of Charlemagne, 26 July 1868

The Germans returned in 1940, this time taking the forts in only three days. Most Jews were saved, with the help of the sympathetic population, as many Jewish children and refugees were hidden in the numerous monasteries. Liege was liberated by the British Second Army in September 1944.

After the war ended, the Royal Question came to the fore, since many saw King Leopold III as collaborating with the Germans during the war. In July 1950, André Renard, leader of the Liègian FGTB launched the General strike against Leopold III of Belgium and "seized control over the city of Liège". The strike ultimately led to Leopold's abdication.

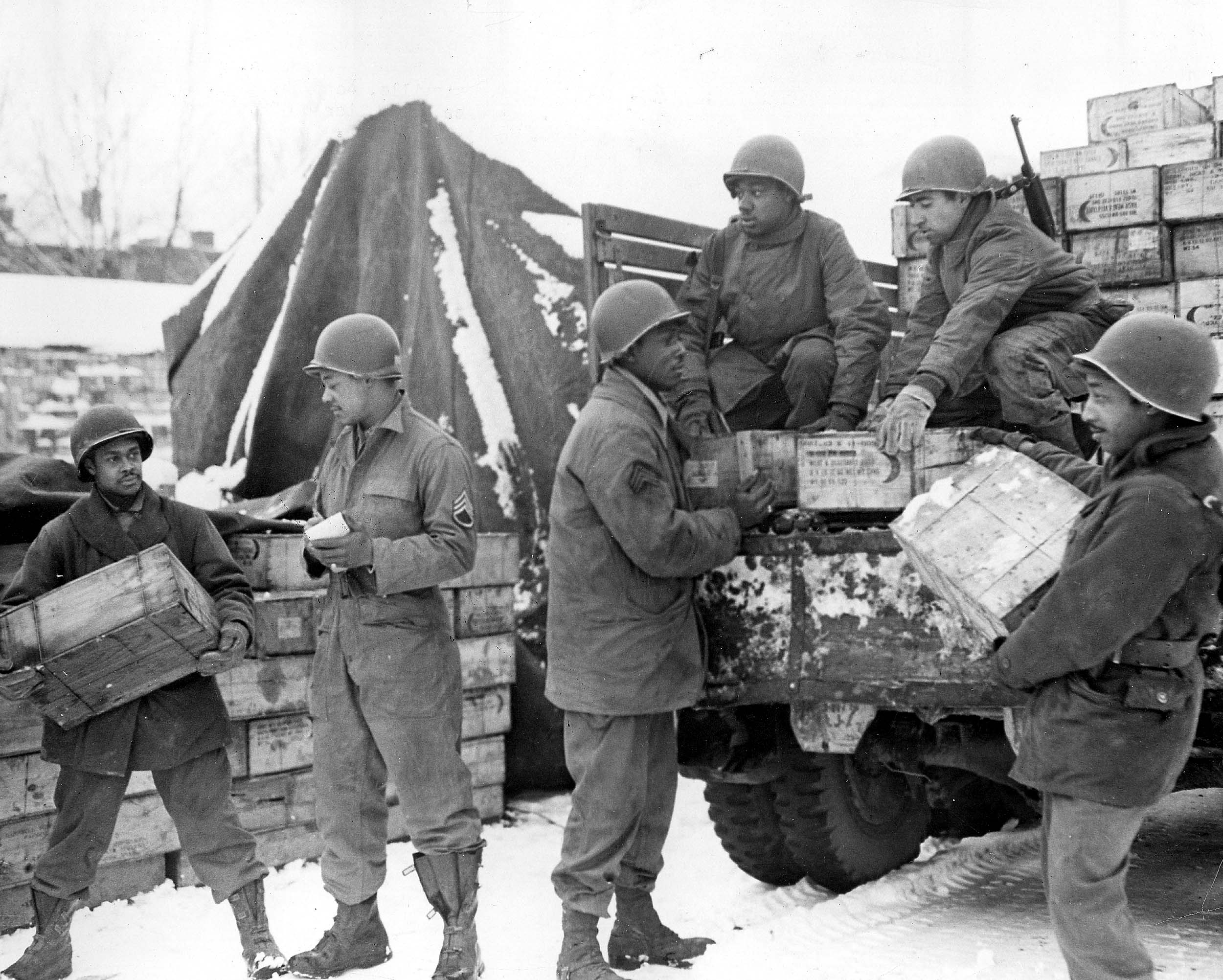
1944: Soldiers of the US Army 4185th Quartermaster Service Company loading a Red Ball Express truck at Liège.

Liège began to suffer from a relative decline of its industry, particularly the coal industry, and later the steel industry, producing high levels of unemployment and stoking social tension. During the 1960–1961 Winter General Strike, disgruntled workers went on a rampage and severely damaged the central railway station Guillemins. The unrest was so intense that "army troops had to wade through caltrops, trees, concrete blocks, car and crane wrecks to advance. Streets were dug up. Liège saw the worst fighting on 6 January 1961. In all, 75 people were injured during seven hours of street battles."

On 6 December 1985, the city's courthouse was heavily damaged and one person was killed in a bomb attack by a lawyer.

Liège is also known as a traditionally socialist city. In 1991, powerful Socialist André Cools, a former Deputy Prime Minister, was gunned down in front of his girlfriend's apartment. Many suspected that the assassination was related to a corruption scandal which swept the Socialist Party, and the Belgian Federal Government in general, after Cools' death. Two men were sentenced to twenty years in jail in 2004, for involvement in Cools' murder.

Liège has shown some signs of economic recovery in recent years with the opening up of borders within the European Union, surging steel prices, and improved administration. Several new shopping centres have been built, and numerous repairs carried out.

On 13 December 2011, there was a grenade and gun attack at Place Saint-Lambert. An attacker, later identified as Nordine Amrani, aged 33, armed with grenades and an assault rifle, attacked people waiting at a bus stop. There were six fatalities, including the attacker (who shot himself), and 123 people were injured.

On 29 May 2018, two female police officers and one civilian—a 22-year-old man—were shot dead by a gunman near a café on Boulevard d'Avroy in central Liège. The attacker then began firing at the officers in an attempt to escape, injuring a number of them "around their legs", before he was shot dead. Belgian broadcaster RTBF said the gunman was temporarily released from prison on 28 May where he had been serving time on drug offences. The incident is currently being treated as terrorism.

== Climate ==
In spite of its inland position Liège has a maritime climate influenced by the mildening sea winds originating from the Gulf Stream, travelling over Belgium's interior. As a result, Liège has very mild winters for its latitude and inland position, especially compared to areas in the Russian Far East and the fellow Francophone province of Quebec. Summers are also moderated by the maritime air, with average temperatures being similar to areas as far north as in Scandinavia. Being inland though, Liège has a relatively low winter seasonal lag.

Climate data for Liège (1991−2020 normals, extremes 1949−present)
Month	Jan	Feb	Mar	Apr	May	Jun	Jul	Aug	Sep	Oct	Nov	Dec	Year
Record high °C (°F)	15.3 (59.5)	20.0 (68.0)	24.4 (75.9)	28.9 (84.0)	32.8 (91.0)	36.8 (98.2)	39.5 (103.1)	36.1 (97.0)	33.3 (91.9)	26.3 (79.3)	21.3 (70.3)	16.3 (61.3)	39.5 (103.1)
Mean daily maximum °C (°F)	6.4 (43.5)	7.3 (45.1)	11.1 (52.0)	15.4 (59.7)	19.0 (66.2)	22.0 (71.6)	24.1 (75.4)	23.9 (75.0)	20.1 (68.2)	15.4 (59.7)	10.2 (50.4)	6.8 (44.2)	15.2 (59.4)
Daily mean °C (°F)	3.7 (38.7)	4.2 (39.6)	7.1 (44.8)	10.4 (50.7)	14.2 (57.6)	17.3 (63.1)	19.3 (66.7)	19.0 (66.2)	15.6 (60.1)	11.7 (53.1)	7.4 (45.3)	4.4 (39.9)	11.2 (52.2)
Mean daily minimum °C (°F)	1.1 (34.0)	1.1 (34.0)	3.1 (37.6)	5.5 (41.9)	9.4 (48.9)	12.5 (54.5)	14.5 (58.1)	14.1 (57.4)	11.1 (52.0)	8.0 (46.4)	4.5 (40.1)	2.0 (35.6)	7.2 (45.0)
Record low °C (°F)	−19.8 (−3.6)	−18.8 (−1.8)	−16.7 (1.9)	−5.8 (21.6)	−1.7 (28.9)	1.2 (34.2)	2.7 (36.9)	4.5 (40.1)	0.0 (32.0)	−4.8 (23.4)	−8.9 (16.0)	−16.1 (3.0)	−19.8 (−3.6)
Average precipitation mm (inches)	72.2 (2.84)	65.9 (2.59)	60.1 (2.37)	52.7 (2.07)	67.7 (2.67)	78.6 (3.09)	78.9 (3.11)	85.2 (3.35)	67.5 (2.66)	67.4 (2.65)	68.3 (2.69)	89.1 (3.51)	853.7 (33.61)
Average precipitation days (≥ 1.0 mm)	13.3	12.2	11.7	9.5	10.7	11.0	10.8	10.7	9.9	11.1	12.7	15.3	138.8
Mean monthly sunshine hours	61	79	130	181	203	208	214	204	159	116	67	49	1,670
Source 1: Royal Meteorological Institute
Source 2: Extremes

== Demographics ==
On 1 January 2013, the municipality of Liège had a total population of 197,013. The metropolitan area has about 750,000 inhabitants. Its inhabitants are predominantly French-speaking, with German and Dutch-speaking minorities. Akin to the rest of Belgium, the population of minorities has grown significantly since the 1990s. The city has become the home to large numbers of Algerian, Moroccan, Turkish, and Vietnamese immigrants. Liège also houses a significant African community.

The city is a major educational hub in Belgium. There are 42,000 pupils attending more than 24 schools. The University of Liège, founded in 1817, has 20,000 students.

Group of origin	Year		Year		Year		Year	
Group of origin	2000		2010		2020		2026	
Group of origin	Number	%	Number	%	Number	%	Number	%
Belgians with Belgian background	120,331	64,8	104,751	54,4	90,329	45,8	82,220	41,5
Belgians with foreign background	33,141	17,8	53,488	27,8	68,464	34,7	74,092	37,4
Neighboring country	4,277	2,36	4,729	2,46	5,005	2,54	5,081	2,58
EU27 (excluding neighboring country)	14,669	7,90	17,936	9,32	19,252	9,76	18,971	9,57
Outside EU 27	14,195	7,64	30,823	16,02	44,207	22,41	50,040	25,25
Non-Belgians	32,167	17,4	34,265	17,8	38,424	19,5	41,790	21,1
Neighboring country	3,121	1,70	4,542	2,36	5,139	2,61	5,416	2,74
EU27 (excluding neighboring country)	17,010	9,20	13,588	7,06	11,572	5,88	10,891	5,50
Outside EU 27	12,036	6,50	16,135	8,38	21,713	11.01	25,483	12,86
Total	185,639	100	192,504	100	197,217	100	198,102	100

== Main sights ==
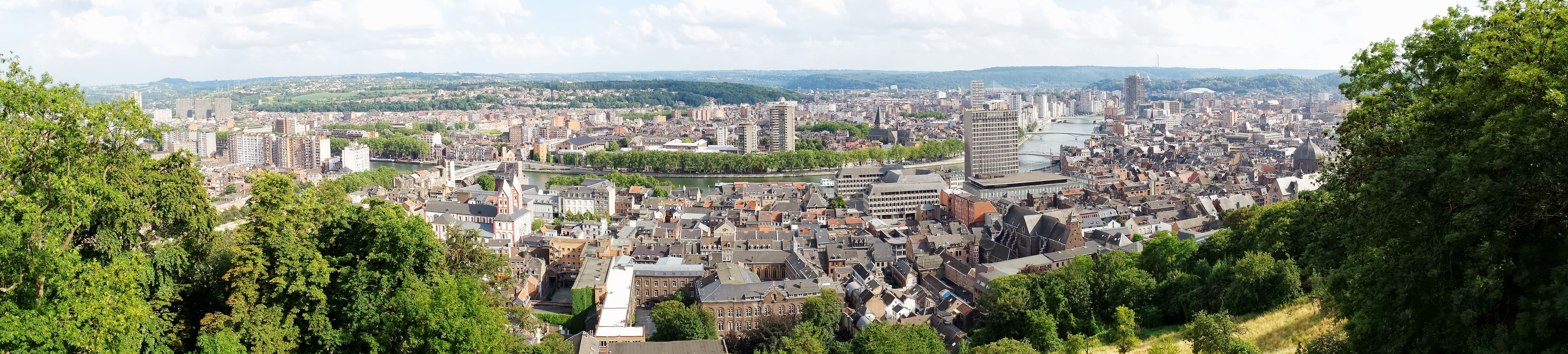
Panorama of the city of Liège. Photo taken from the heights of the Citadel (left bank of the Meuse).

- The vast palace of the Prince-Bishops of Liège is built on the Place St Lambert, where the old St. Lambert's Cathedral used to stand before the French Revolution. The oldest rooms date from the 16th century. An archeological display, the Archéoforum, can be visited under the Place St Lambert.
- The Perron of Liège on the nearby Place du Marché was once the symbol of justice in the Prince-Bishopric and is now the symbol of the city. It stands in front of the 17th century city hall.
- The seven collegiate churches of Liège:
  - St Paul (raised to cathedral status as Liège Cathedral in 1802, after the demolition of St Lambert's Cathedral), It contains a treasury and Saint Lambert's tomb.
  - St James (raised to collegiate status after the demolition of St Peter's Collegiate Church in 1811). Built in the flamboyant gothic style, with an early Renaissance porch. The statues are by Liège sculptor Jean Del Cour. Saint-Jacques contains 29 14th-century misericords.
  - St Martin
  - St Denis
  - St John the Evangelist
  - Holy Cross
  - St Bartholomew
- The main museums in Liège are:
  - La Boverie (Musée des Beaux-Arts)
  - Museum of Walloon Life
  - Museum of Walloon Art & Religious Art (Mosan art)
  - The Grand Curtius Museum is an elegantly furnished mansion from the 17th century along the river Meuse, housing collections of Egyptology, weaponry, archaeology, fine arts, religious art and Mosan art
  - Trinkhall Museum, a contemporary art museum with pieces from mentally disabled artists.
- Other sites of interest include the historical city centre (the Carré), the Hors-Château area, the Outremeuse area, the parks and boulevards along the river Meuse, the Citadel, the 374 steps stairway "Montagne de Bueren", leading from Hors-Château to the Citadel, 'Médiacité' shopping mall designed by Ron Arad Architects, the Interallied Memorial of Cointe, a complex consisting of the Sacré-Cœur church and the Art Deco Memorial tower, designed by Joseph Smolderen, with a very nice view of the city and the Liège-Guillemins railway station designed by Santiago Calatrava.
- Liège's pedestrian zone is the biggest pedestrian zone of the Walloon Region and the Meuse-Rhine Euroregion; it is also the oldest in Belgium. The pedestrian zone progressively has grown since 1965 to contain the majority of the hypercentre of Liège. It continues to grow today with the addition of the Rue de la Casquette on 12 December 2014.
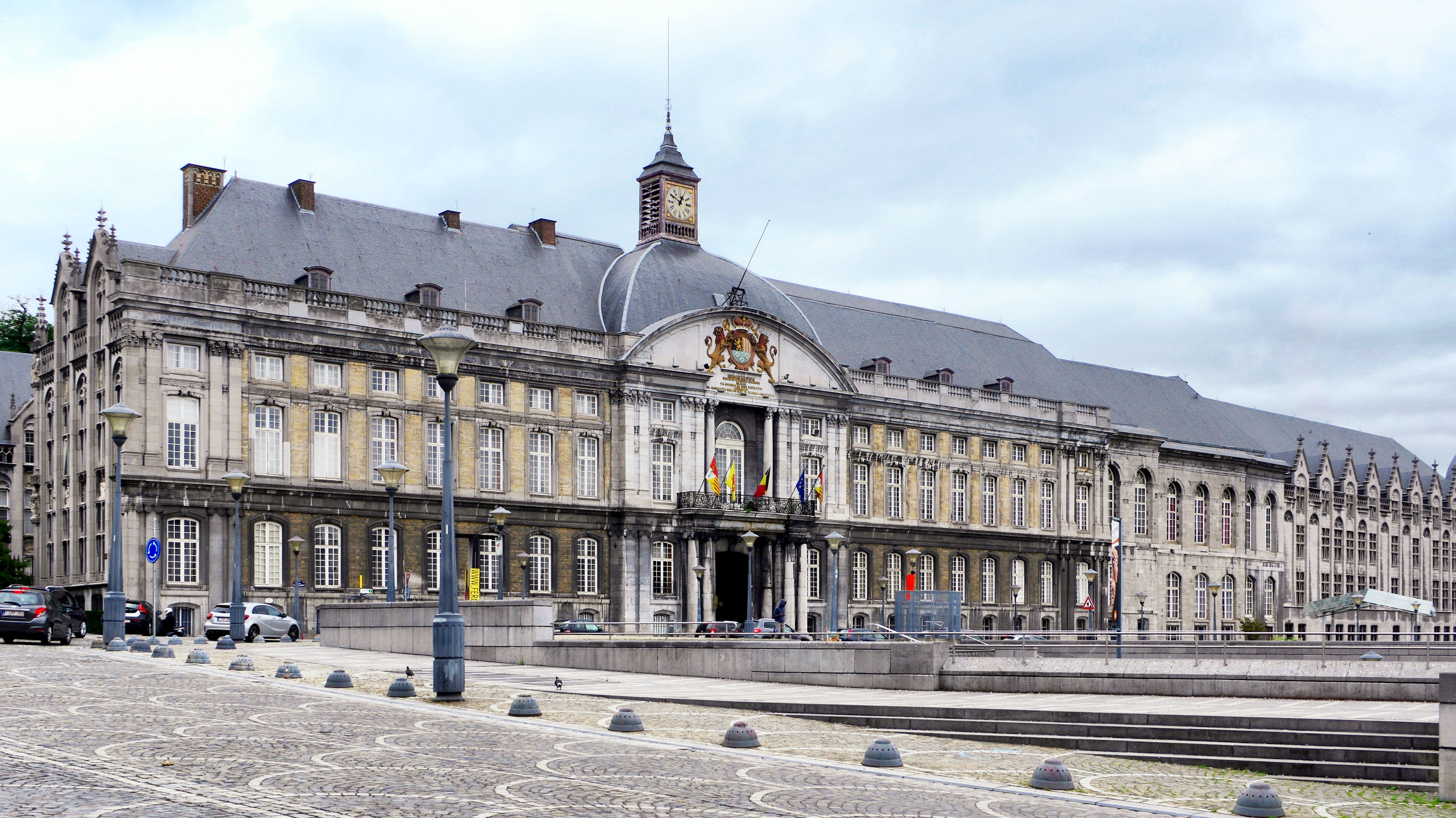
Prince-Bishops' Palace, residence of former Prince-Bishops of Liège

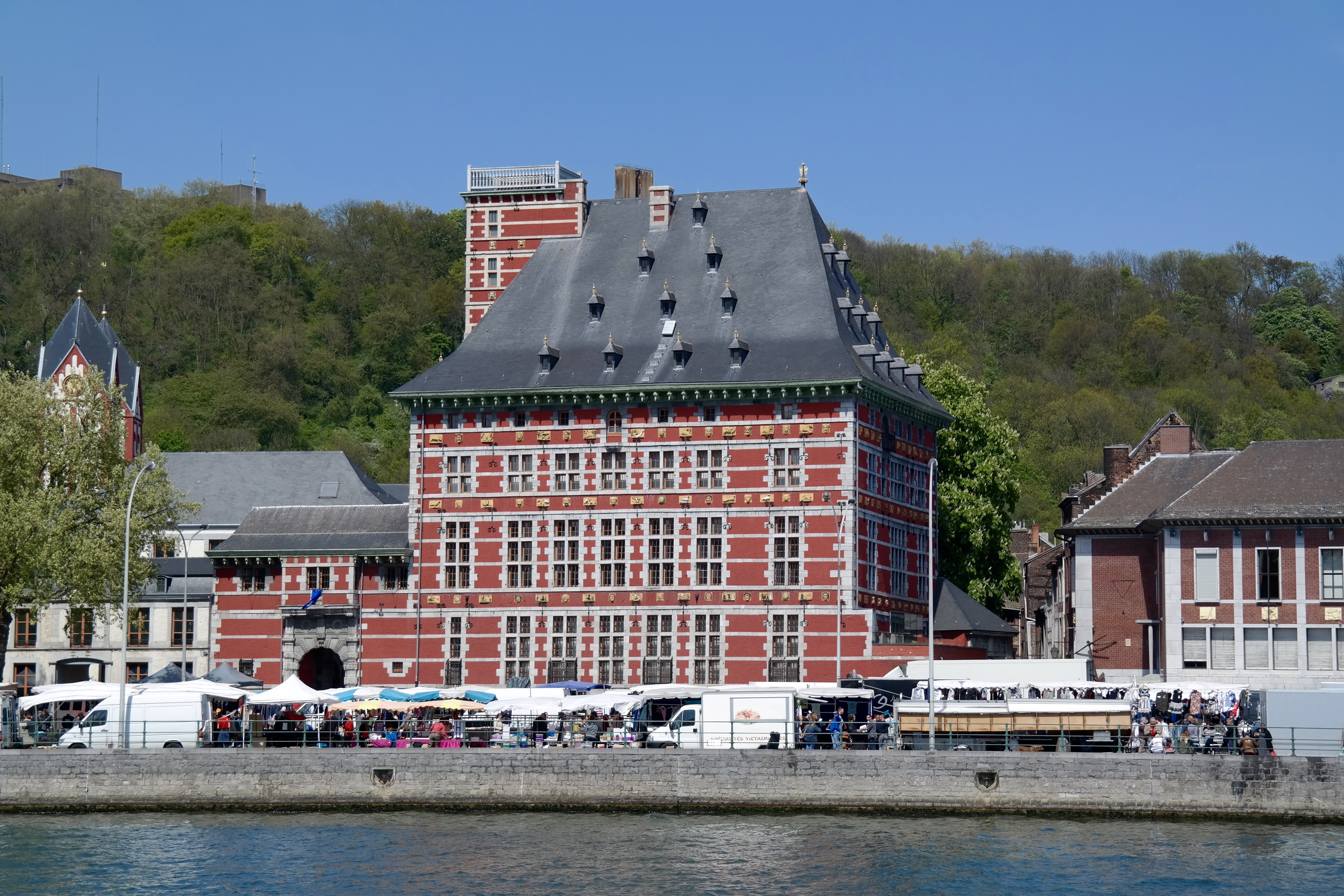
Curtius Museum, museum of archaeology and decorative arts, located on the bank of the Meuse

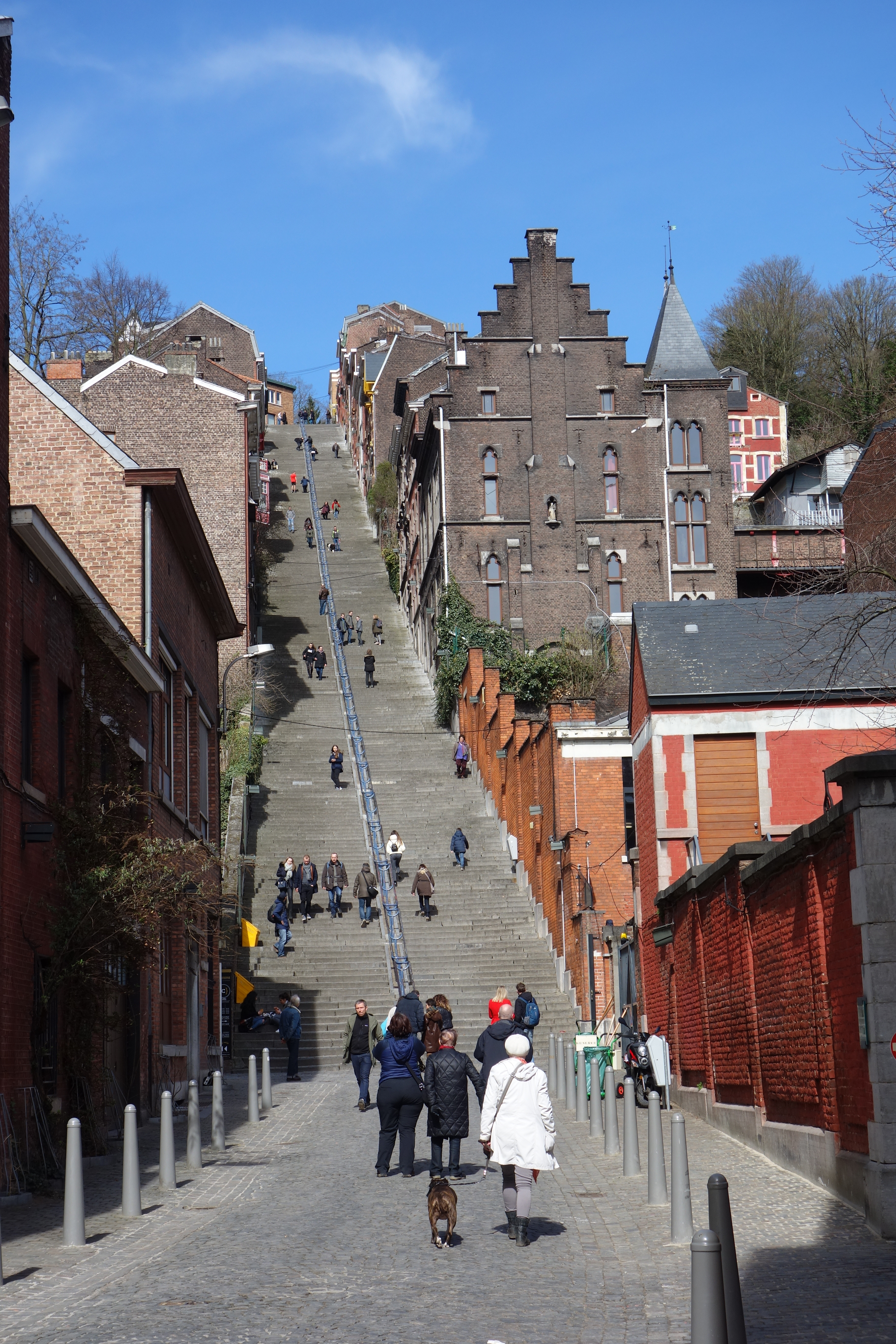
The stairway of the Montagne de Bueren

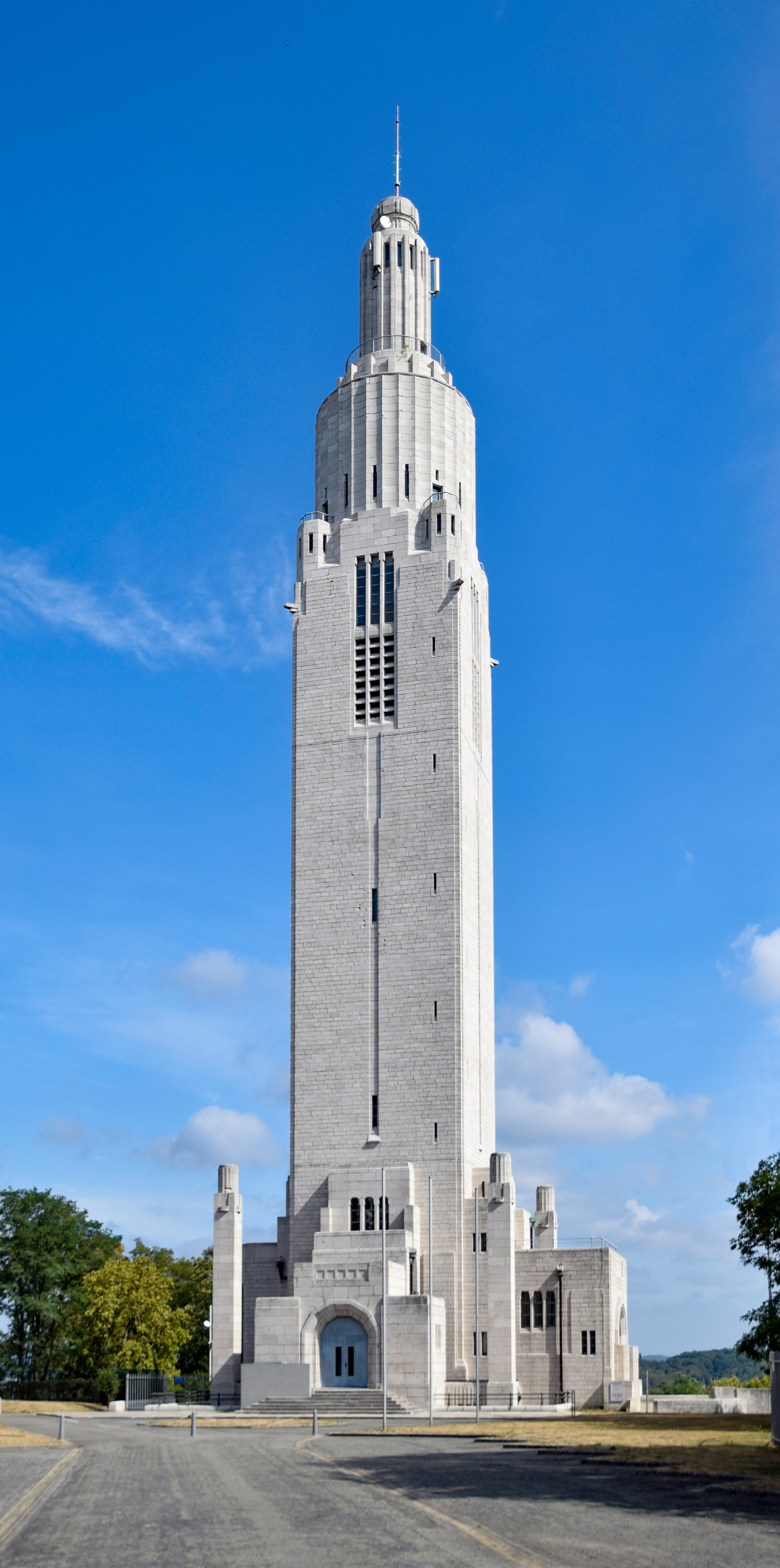
The Art Deco Memorial tower of the Interallied Memorial of Cointe complex

== Folklore ==
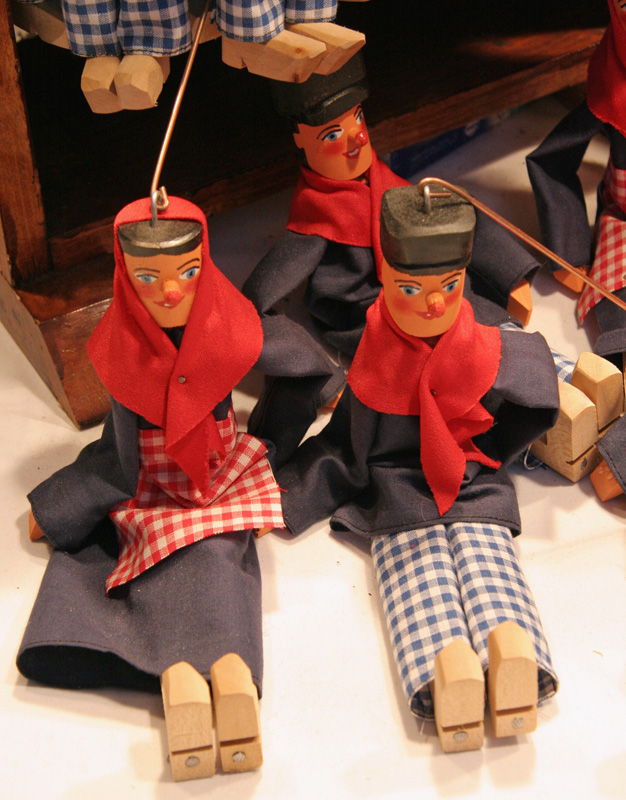
Traditional Liègian puppets

The Le Quinze Août celebration takes place annually on 15 August in Outremeuse and celebrates the Virgin Mary. It is one of the biggest folkloric displays in the city, with a religious procession, a flea market, dances, concerts, and a series of popular games. Nowadays these celebrations start a few days earlier and last until the 16th. Some citizens open their doors to party goers, and serve "peket", the traditional local alcohol. This tradition is linked to the important folkloric character Tchantchès (Walloon for François), a hard-headed but resourceful Walloon boy who lived during Charlemagne's times. Tchantchès is remembered with a statue, a museum, and a number of puppets found all over the city. The Le Quinze Août celebrations conclude on 16 August with the procession and burial of Matî l'Ohê, the ceremonial ham bone.

Liège hosts one of the oldest and biggest Christmas Markets in Belgium, and the oldest kermesse, the Foire de Liège held each year from 28 October.

== Culture ==
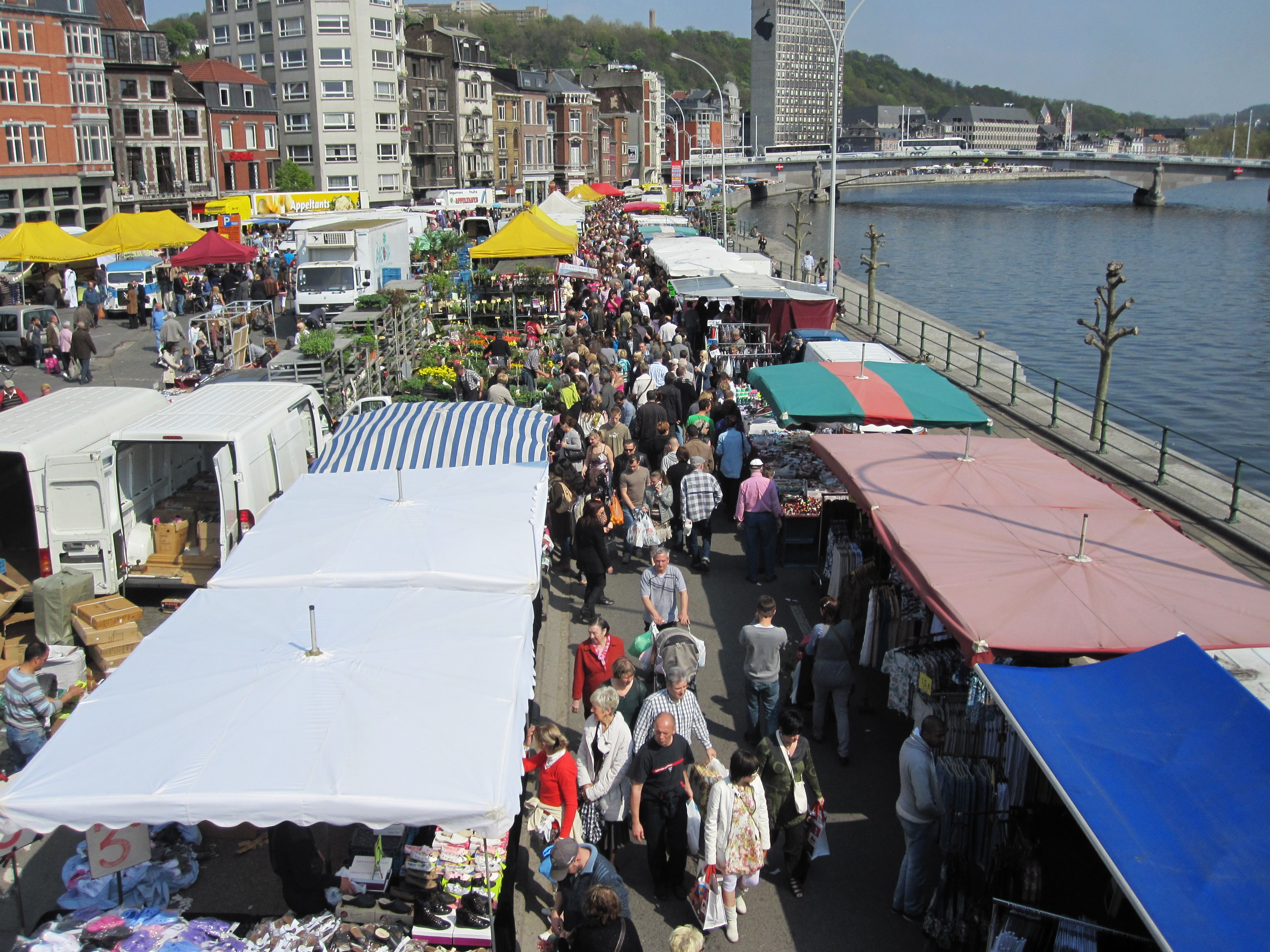
Liège, the Sunday "Batte" market

The city is well known for its very crowded folk festivals. The 15 August festival ("Le 15 août") may be the best known. The population gathers in a quarter named Outre-Meuse with plenty of tiny pedestrian streets and old yards. Many people come to see the procession but also to drink alcohol (mostly peket) and beer, eat cooked pears, boûkètes or sausages or simply enjoy the atmosphere until the early hours. The Saint Nicholas festival around 6 December is organized by and for the students of the university; for a few days before the event, students (wearing very dirty lab-coats) beg for money, mostly for drinking.

Liège is renowned for its nightlife. Within the pedestrian zone behind the Opera House, there is a square city block known locally as Le Carré (the Square) with many lively pubs which are reputed to remain open until the last customer leaves (typically around 6 am). Another active area is the Place du Marché.

The "Batte" market is where most locals visit on Sundays. The outdoor market goes along the river Meuse and also attracts many visitors to Liège. The market typically runs from early morning to 2 o'clock in the afternoon every Sunday year long. Produce, clothing, and snack vendors are the main concentration of the market.

Liège is home to the Opéra Royal de Wallonie (English: Royal Opera of Wallonia) and the Orchestre Philharmonique Royal de Liège (OPRL) (English: Liège Royal Philharmonic Orchestra).

The city annually hosts a significant electro-rock festival Les Ardentes and jazz festival Jazz à Liège.

Liège has active alternative cinemas, Le Churchill, Le Parc and Le Sauvenière. There are also two mainstream cinemas, the Kinepolis multiplexes.

Liège also has a particular Walloon dialect, sometimes said to be one of Belgium's most distinctive. There is a large Italian community, and Italian can be heard in many places.

== Sports ==
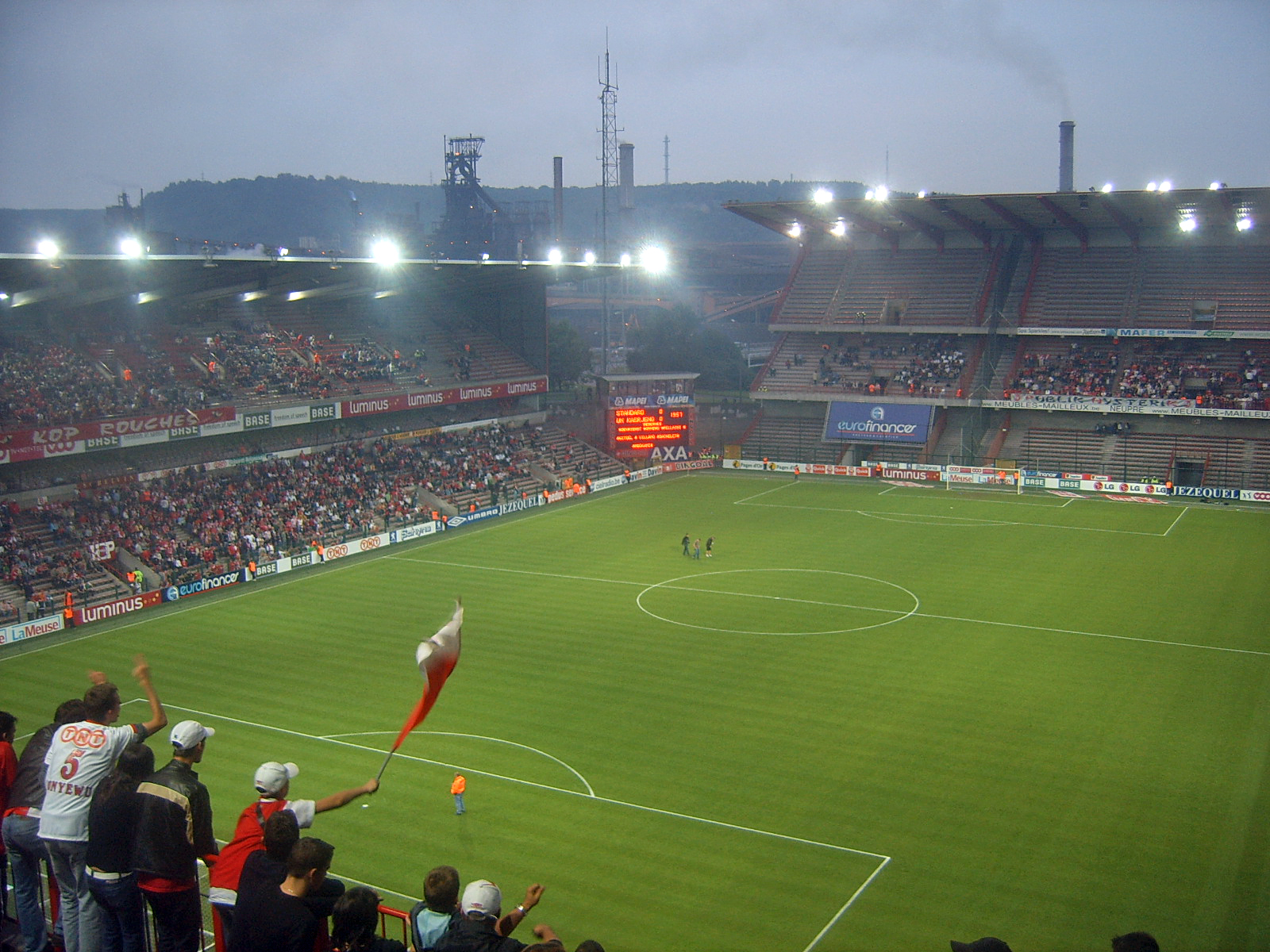
Stade Maurice Dufrasne, home to football club Standard Liège.

The city has a number of football teams, most notably Standard Liège, which has won several championships and which was previously owned by Roland Duchâtelet; and R.F.C. de Liège, one of the oldest football clubs in Belgium, known for having refused to release player Jean-Marc Bosman, a case which led to the Bosman ruling.

In spring, Liège hosts the start and finish of the annual Liège–Bastogne–Liège cycling race, one of the spring classics and the oldest of the five monuments of cycling. The race starts in the centre of Liège, before heading south to Bastogne and returning north to finish in the industrial suburb of Ans. Traveling through the hilly Ardennes, it is one of the longest and most arduous races of the season.

Liège is the only city that has hosted stages of all three cycling Grand Tours. It staged the start of the 1973 and 2006 Giro d'Italia; as well as the Grand Départ of the 2004, 2012, and 2017 Tour de France making it the first city outside France to host the Grand Départ twice or more times. In 2009, the Vuelta a España visited Liège after four stages in the Netherlands, making Liège the first city that has hosted stages of all three cycling Grand Tours.

Liège is also home to boxer Ermano Fegatilli, the current European Boxing Union Super Featherweight champion.

== Economy ==
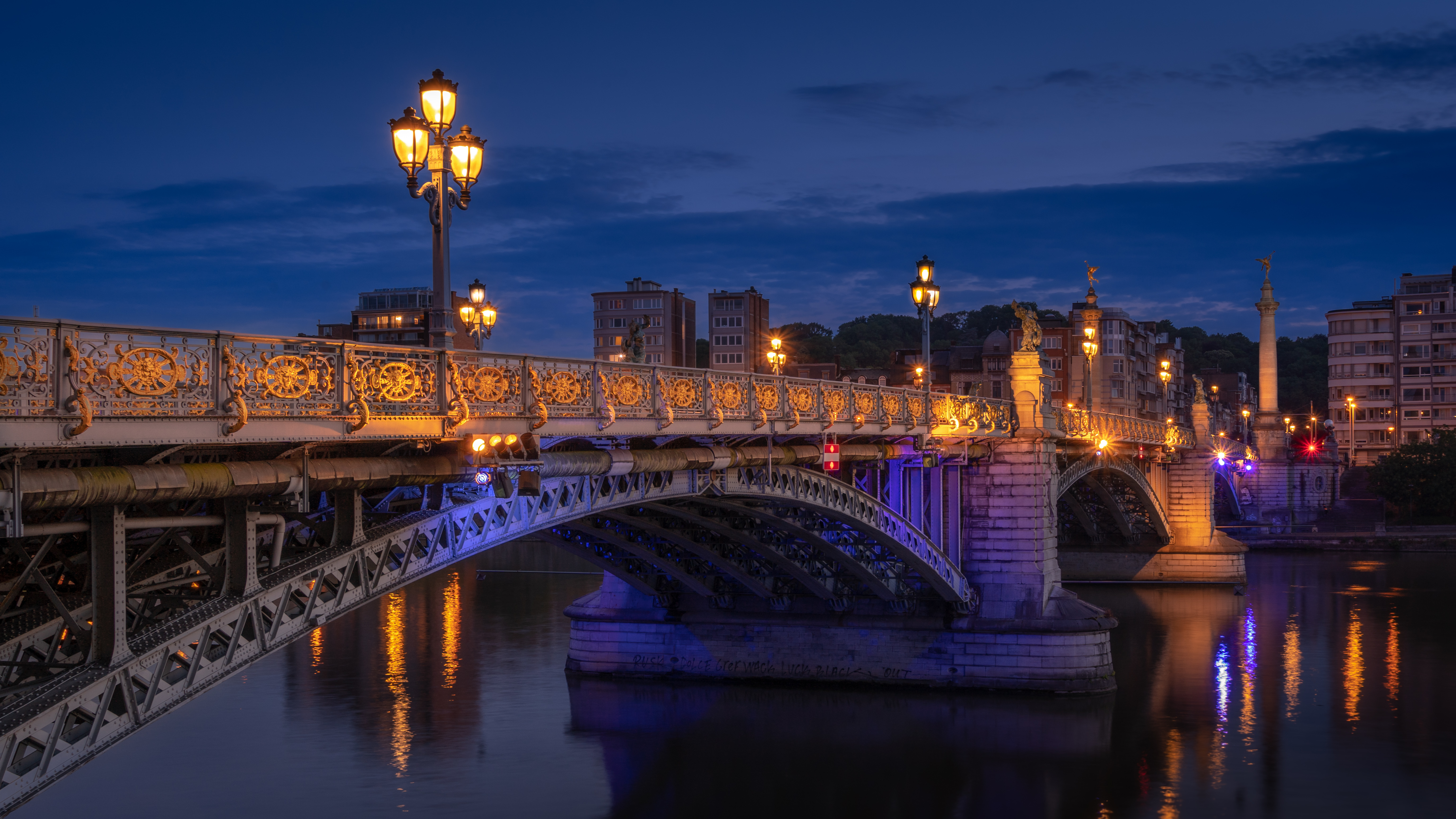
Pont de Fragnée

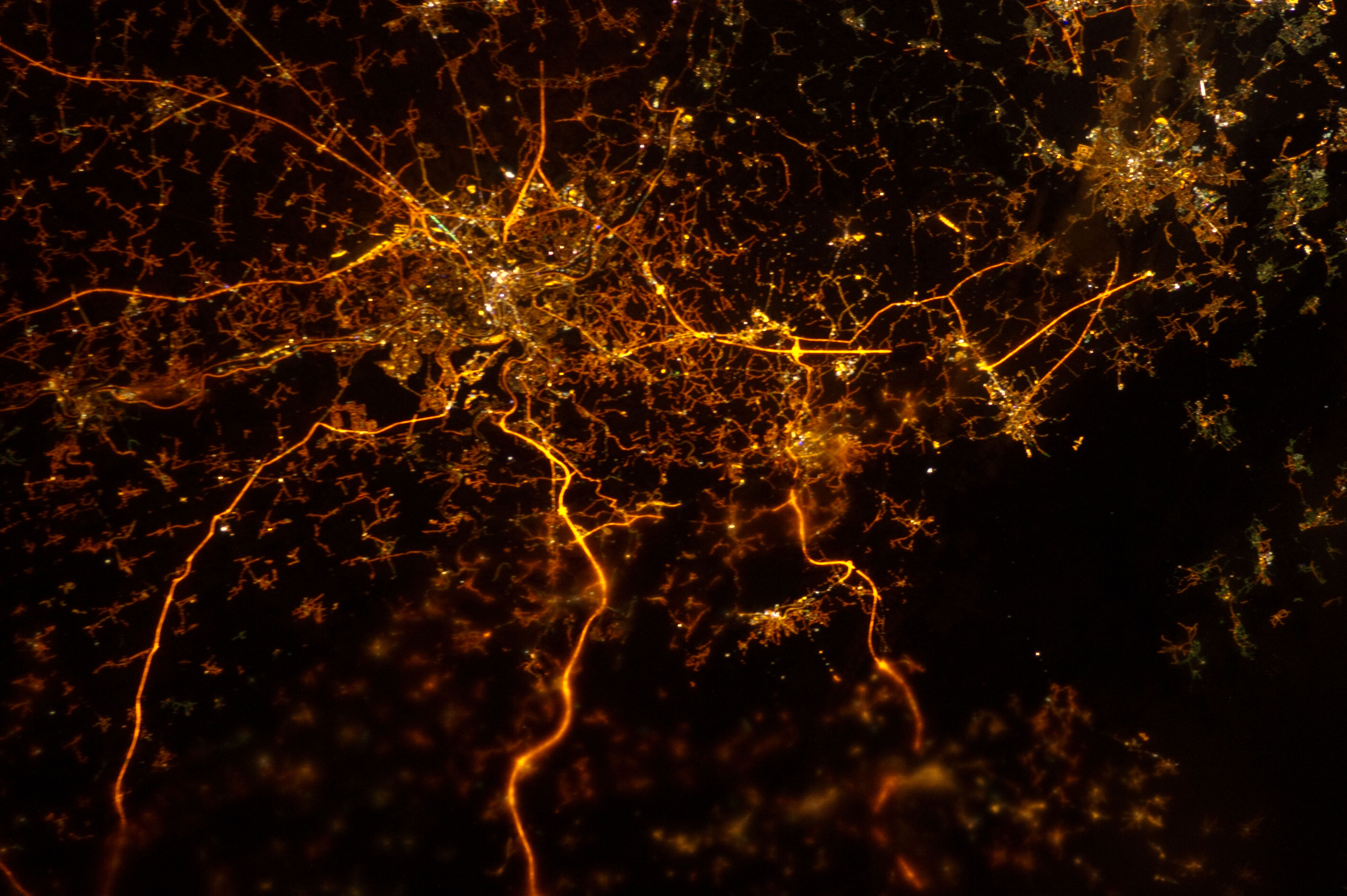
Liège at night, photography taken from the ISS in December 2012

Liège is the most important city of the Walloon region from an economic perspective. In the past, Liège was one of the most important industrial centres in Europe, particularly in steel-making. Starting in 1817, John Cockerill extensively developed the iron and steel industry. The industrial complex of Seraing was the largest in the world. It once boasted numerous blast furnaces and mills. Liège has also been an important centre for gunsmithing since the Middle Ages and the arms industry is still strong today, with the headquarters of FN Herstal and CMI Defence being located in Liège.

The economy of the region is now diversified; the most important centres are: Mechanical industries (Aircraft engine and Spacecraft propulsion), space technology, information technology, biotechnology and the production of water, beer, and chocolate. Liège has an important group of headquarters dedicated to high-technology, such as Techspace Aero, which manufactures pieces for the Airbus A380 or the rocket Ariane 5. Other stand-out sectors include Amós which manufactures optical components for telescopes and Drytec, which produces compressed air dryers. Liège also has many other electronic companies such as SAP, EVS, Gillam, AnB, Balteau, IP Trade. Other prominent businesses are the global leader in light armament FN Herstal, the beer company Jupiler, the chocolate company Galler, and the water and soda companies Spa and Chaudfontaine. A science park southeast of the city, near the University of Liège campus, houses spin-offs and high technology businesses.

=== 1812 mine accident ===
In 1812, there were three coal pits (Bure) in close proximity just outside the city gates: Bure Triquenotte, Bure de Beaujone and Bure Mamonster. The first two shafts were joined underground, but the last one was a separate colliery. The shafts were 120 fathoms (720 ft; 220 m) deep. Water was led to a sump (serrement) from which it could be pumped to the surface. At 11:00 on 28 February 1812 the sump in the Beaujone mine failed and flooded the entire colliery. Of the 127 men down the mine at the time 35 escaped by the main shaft, but 74 were trapped. [These numbers are taken from the report, the 18 miner discrepancy is unexplained.] The trapped men attempted to dig a passageway into Mamonster. After 23 feet (7.0 m) there was a firedamp explosion and they realised that they had penetrated some old workings belonging to an abandoned mine, Martin Wery. The overseer, Monsieur Goffin, led the men to the point in Martin Wery which he judged closest to Mamonster and they commence to dig. By the second day they had run out of candles and dug the remainder of a 36 feet (11 m) gallery in darkness.

On the surface the only possible rescue was held to be via Mamonster. A heading was driven towards Beaujone with all possible speed, including blasting. The trapped miners heard the rescuers and vice versa. Five days after the accident communication was possible and the rescuers worked in darkness to avoid the risk of a firedamp explosion. By 7pm that evening an opening was made, 511 feet (156 m) of tunnel had been dug by hand in five days. All of the 74 miners in Goffin's part survived and were brought to the surface.

== Transport ==
=== Air ===
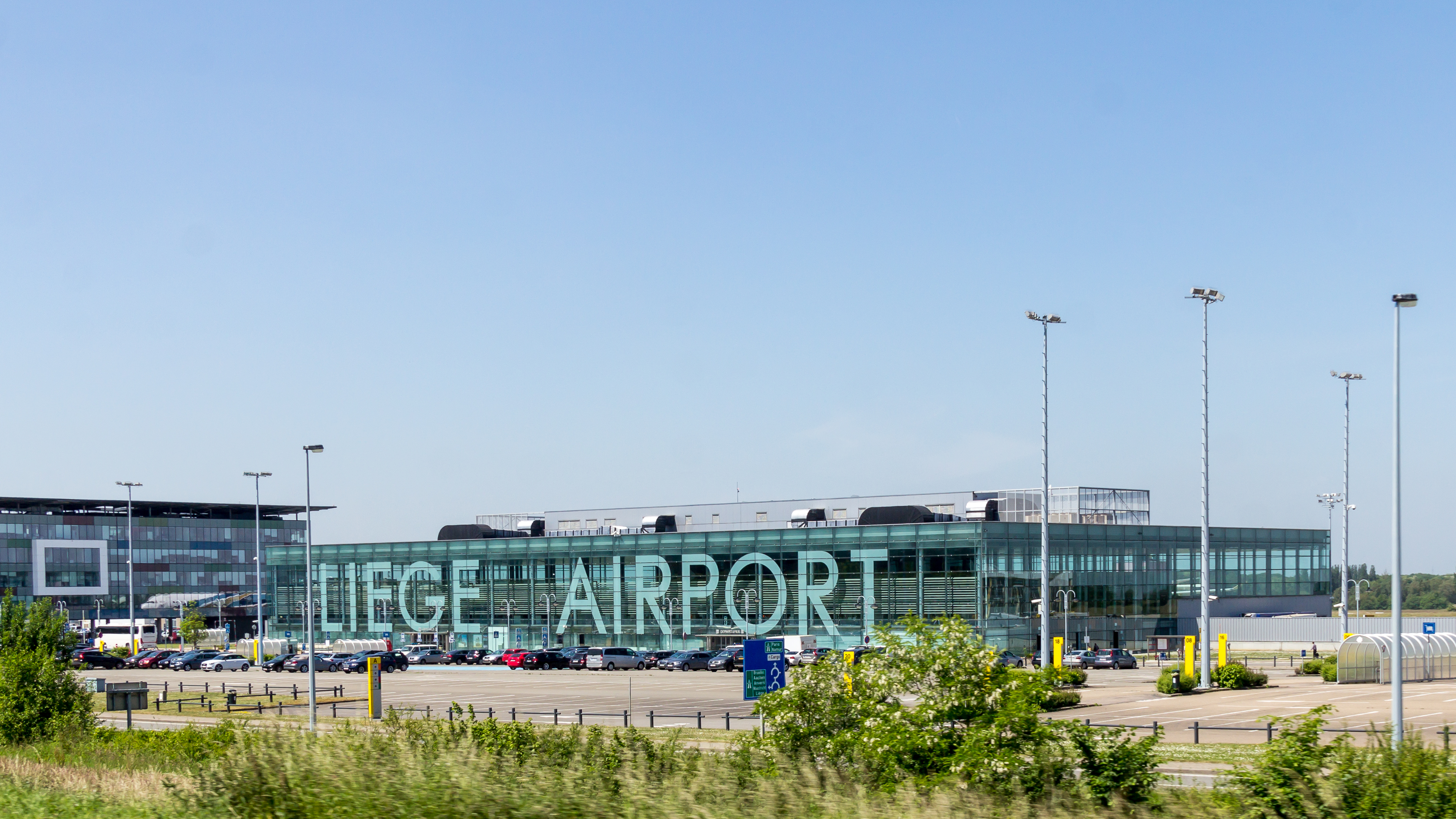
Passenger terminal of Liège Airport

Liège is served by Liège Airport, located in Bierset, a few kilometres west of the city. It is the principal axis for the delivery of freight and in 2011 was the world's 33rd busiest cargo airport. Passenger services are very few. It is owned by the Walloon government along with some private investors.

=== Maritime ===
The Port of Liège, located on the river Meuse, is the 3rd largest river port in Europe. Liège also has direct links to Antwerp through the Albert Canal and to Rotterdam via the river Meuse. It stretches over a distance of 26 kilometres and comprises 32 port areas and covers 3.7 square kilometres.

=== Rail ===
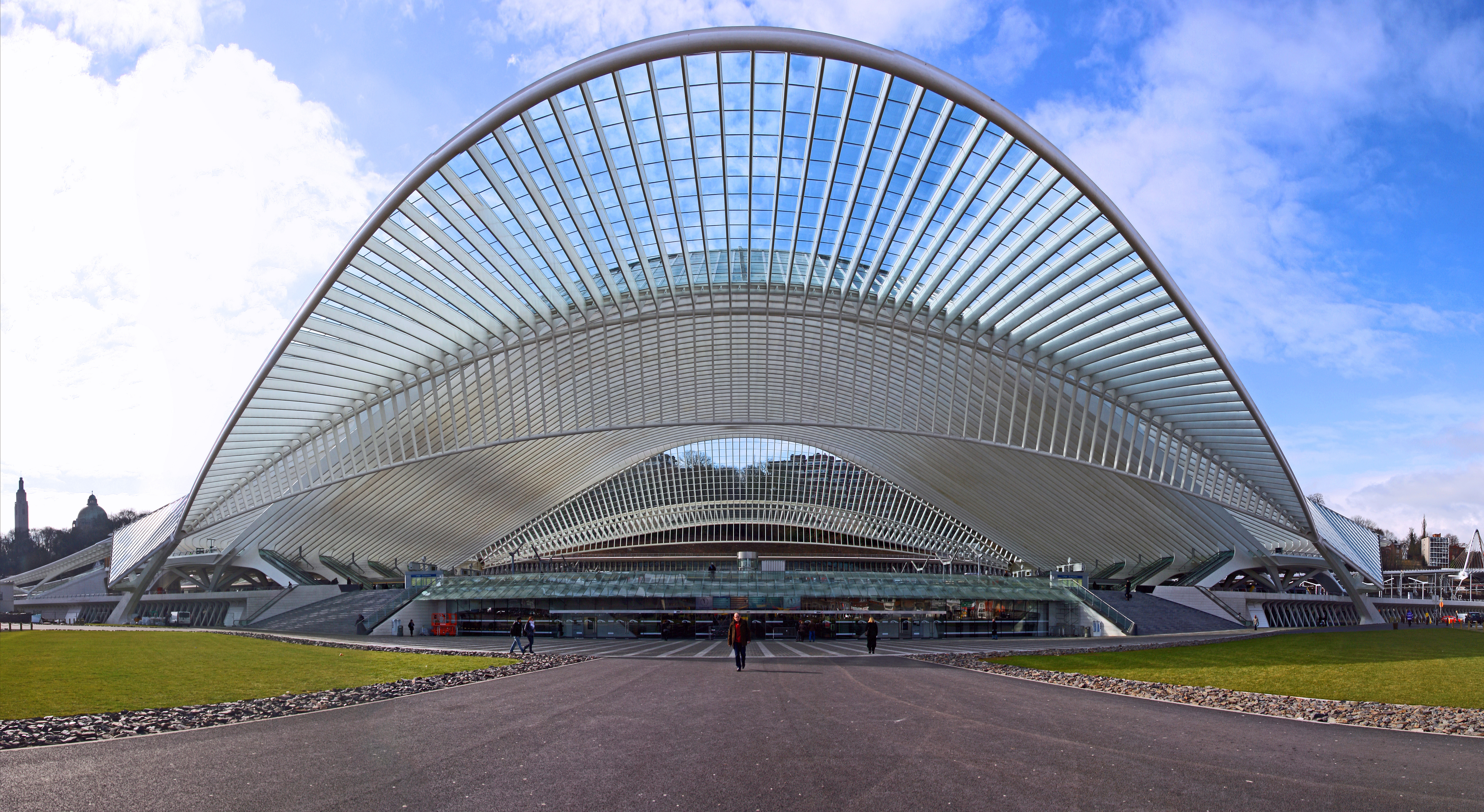
Liège-Guillemins railway station

Liège is served by many direct rail links with the rest of Western Europe. Its three principal stations are Liège-Guillemins railway station, Liège-Carré, and Liège-Saint-Lambert. The InterCity Express and Thalys call at Liège-Guillemins, providing direct connections to Cologne and Frankfurt and Paris-Nord respectively.

Liège was once home to a network of trams. However, they were removed by 1967 in favour of the construction of a new metro system. A prototype of the metro was built and a tunnel was dug underneath the city, but the metro was never built. Later, it was decided to build a modern tramway. By 2019, construction of the line was underway, but would experience various setbacks and delays. The new tramway opened on 28 April 2025.

See article Trams in Liège.

=== Road ===
Liège sits at the crossroads of a number of highways including the European route E25, the European Route E42, the European Route E40 and the European Route E313.

== Notable people ==
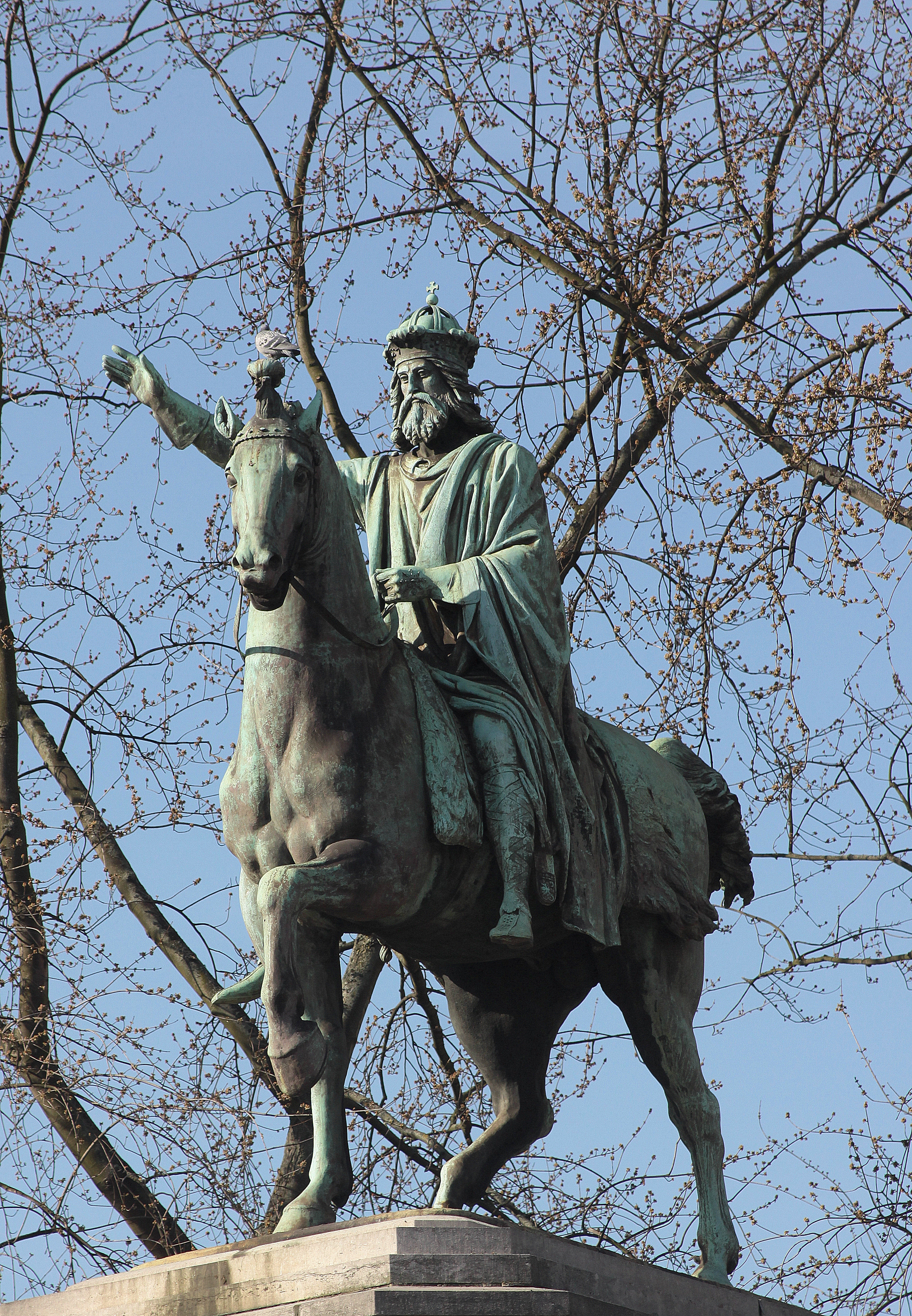
Statue of Charlemagne in the centre of Liège

- Alger of Liège (11th century), learned priest
- Julie Allemand (born 1996), WNBA player
- Nicolas Ancion (born 1971), writer
- Jacques Arcadelt (16th century), composer
- Nacer Chadli (born 1989), football player
- Charlemagne (birth in Liège uncertain, 8th century), King of the Franks, then crowned emperor
- Johannes Ciconia (14th century), composer, Master of the Ars Nova
- Steve Darcis (born 1984), tennis player
- Jean d'Outremeuse (14th century), writer and historian
- Benoît Debie (born 1968), cinematographer
- Theodor de Bry (1528–1598), engraver
- Louis De Geer (1587–1652), introducer of Walloon blast furnaces in Sweden
- Gérard de Lairesse (1640–1711), painter
- Jean-Maurice Dehousse (born 1936), politician, Walloon movement activists, first Minister-President of the Walloon Region
- Serge Delaive (born 1965), writer
- Marie Delcourt (1891–1979), professor at the university, expert of the ancient Greek religion, Walloon movement activist
- Louis Dewis (1872–1946), pseudonym for the Post-Impressionist painter born Louis Dewachter, leading retailer who managed the first chain department stores
- Emile Digneffe (1858–1937), lawyer and politician
- José Dupuis (1833–1900), creator of many roles in Offenbach's opéras-bouffes
- Ermano Fegatilli (born 1984), boxer
- César Franck (1822–1890), composer
- Hubert Joseph Walther Frère-Orban (1812–1896), statesman
- Marie Gillain (born 1975), international actress
- David Goffin (born 1990), tennis player
- Anton Gosswin (16th century), composer
- Zénobe Gramme (1826–1901), inventor
- André Ernest Modeste Grétry (1741–1813), composer
- Groupe μ, team of scientists
- Gary Hartstein, M.D. (born 1955), Formula 1 delegate
- Richard Heintz (1871–1929), Post-Impressionist painter
- Justine Henin (born 1982), top ranked female tennis player
- Axel Hervelle (born 1983), basketball player
- Georges Ista (1874–1939), writer
- Joseph Jongen (1873–1953), organist, composer, and educator
- Sandra Kim (born 1972), winner of the Eurovision Song Contest 1986 for Belgium
- Caroline Lamarche (born 1955), French-speaking writer
- Bouli Lanners (born 1965), actor, film director
- Philippe Léonard (born 1974), football player
- Linus of Liège (1595–1675), Counter-reformation critic of Isaac Newton
- Lambert Lombard (1505–1566), painter
- Charles Magnette (1863–1937), lawyer and politician
- Georges Malempré (1944), retired UNESCO official
- Georges Nagelmackers (1845–1905), founder of the Compagnie Internationale des Wagons-Lits
- Hubert Naich (16th century), composer
- Jacques Ochs (1883–1971), artist and Olympic fencing champion
- Pippin the Younger (in French: Pépin le Bref; born in Jupille, 8th century), King of the Franks
- Henri Pousseur (1929–2009), composer
- Armand Rassenfosse (1862–1934), painter, graphic artist
- Jean Rey (1902–1983), Old Minister, Walloon movement activist second President of the European Commission
- Philippe-Charles Schmerling, prehistorian, founder of paleontology
- Gustave Serrurier-Bovy (1858–1910), architect and furniture designer
- Georges Simenon (1903–1989), novelist
- Stanislas-André Steeman (1908–1970), writer
- Haroun Tazieff (1914–1998), volcanologist and geologist
- William of St-Thierry (11th century), theologian and mystic
- Violetta Villas (1938–2011), Polish singer and actress
- Axel Witsel (born 1989), football player
- Eugène Ysaÿe (1858–1931), composer and violinist
- Arthur Theate (born 2000), football player

== International relations ==
=== Twin towns - Sister cities - Partner cities ===
Liège is twinned with (including partner cities):

=== Sister Cities ===
- Nancy, France (1954)
- Cologne, Germany (1958)
- Esch-sur-Alzette, Luxembourg (1958)
- Lille, France (1958)
- Rotterdam, Netherlands (1958)
- Turin, Italy (1958)
- Lubumbashi, Democratic Republic of the Congo (1961)
- Plzeň, Czech Republic (1965)
- Porto, Portugal (1977)
- Kraków, Poland (1978)
- Saint-Louis, Senegal (1980)
- Szeged, Hungary (2001)
- Volgograd, Russia (1959) Suspended due to the 2022 Russian invasion of Ukraine

=== Partner cities ===
- Aachen, Germany
- Abidjan, Ivory Coast
- Baton Rouge, United States
- Bilbao, Spain
- Elbasan, Albania
- Hasselt, Belgium
- Heerlen, Netherlands
- Maastricht, Netherlands
- Port-au-Prince, Haiti
- Ramallah, Palestine
- Quebec City, Canada
- Samarkand, Uzbekistan
- Taiyuan, China
- Tangier, Morocco

== See also ==
- University of Liège
- Liège Science Park
- Bishop of Liège
- Liège–Bastogne–Liège
- Ratherius
- Liège Island, Antarctica, named after the city
- Rida (river)
