= Georges Malempré =

Belgian diplomat (born 1944)

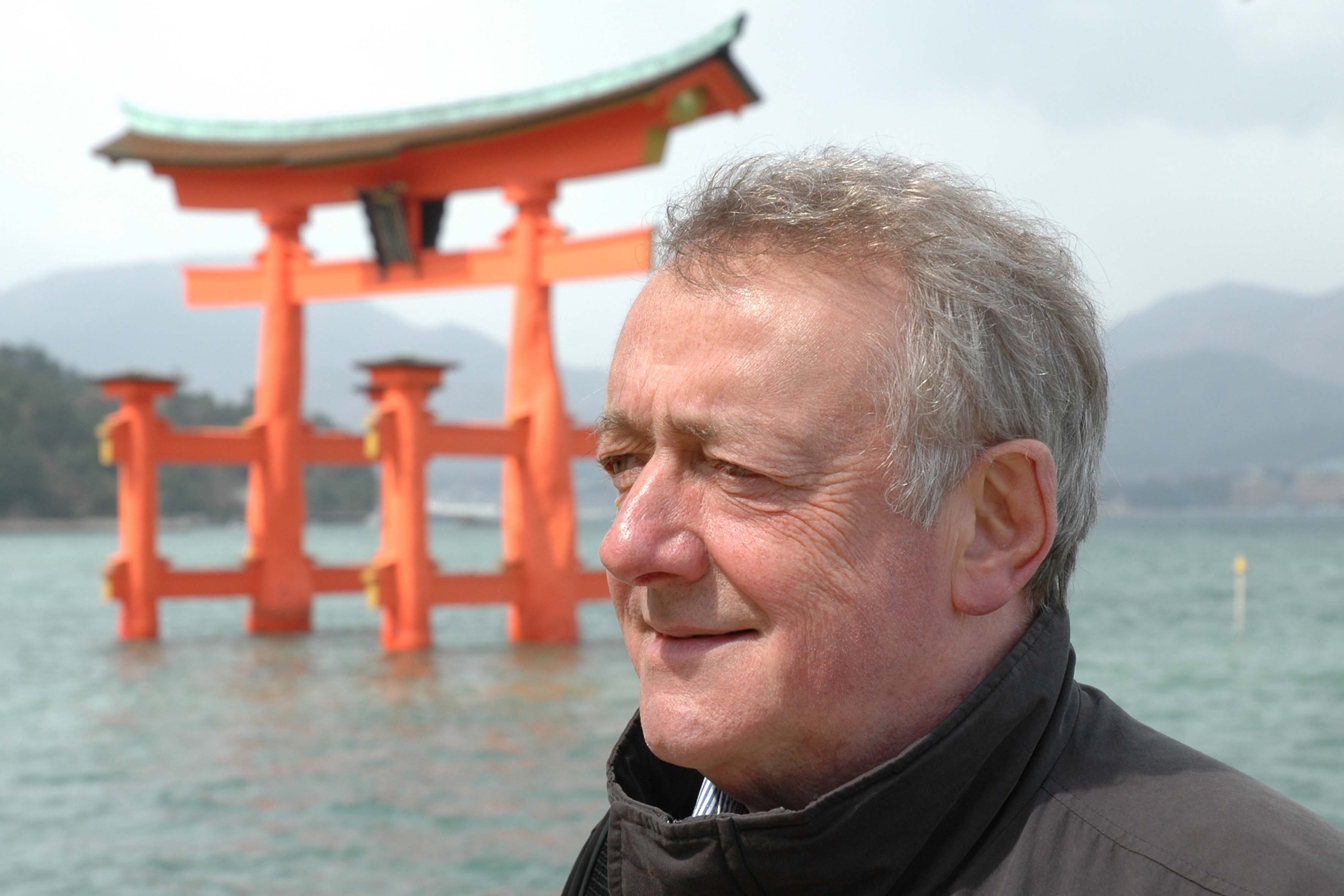
- Malempré, Miyajima Island, Japan, 2006
- Born: 1944 (age 81–82); Liège, Belgium
- Education: University of Louvain
- Known for: UNESCO people

Georges Malempré (born 1944) is a retired official of UNESCO. He was born in Liège, Belgium and holds a degree in economic and social policy from the University of Louvain (Belgium). After serving at director level in a number of national and international youth organizations, he was appointed in 1979 as Councillor in the Executive Office of the Minister-President of the French Community of Belgium, where he was in charge of youth policy and vocational training. From 1975 to 1979, he performed the duties of Secretary-General of the University of Peace (Belgium). During the same period he served as President of the Conference and Standing Committee of International Non-governmental Organizations in consultative status with UNESCO.

Malempré joined the UNESCO Secretariat in January 1980 as Liaison Officer in the Section of Relations with Non-governmental Organizations. He was promoted in 1988 to the post of Chief, Division of International Non-governmental Organizations and Foundations (Bureau of External Relations).

In April 1992, he was appointed Deputy Director, then in February 1997, Director, of the Executive Office of the Director-General of UNESCO, Federico Mayor. On 1 January 1999 he was promoted in his personal capacity to the rank of Assistant Director-General.

Following his election as Director-General of UNESCO, in November 1999, Mr. Koïchiro Matsuura entrusted Mr. Malempré with the mission of drawing up a draft communication and public information strategy for the Organization. Upon the approval of the strategy by the Executive Board of UNESCO, at its spring 2001 session, Mr. Malempré was appointed, in June 2001, to the post of Director of the UNESCO Liaison Office and Representative to the United Nations and Specialized Agencies in Geneva, a post which he held until his retirement in May 2004.
