= Hôtel d'Ansembourg =

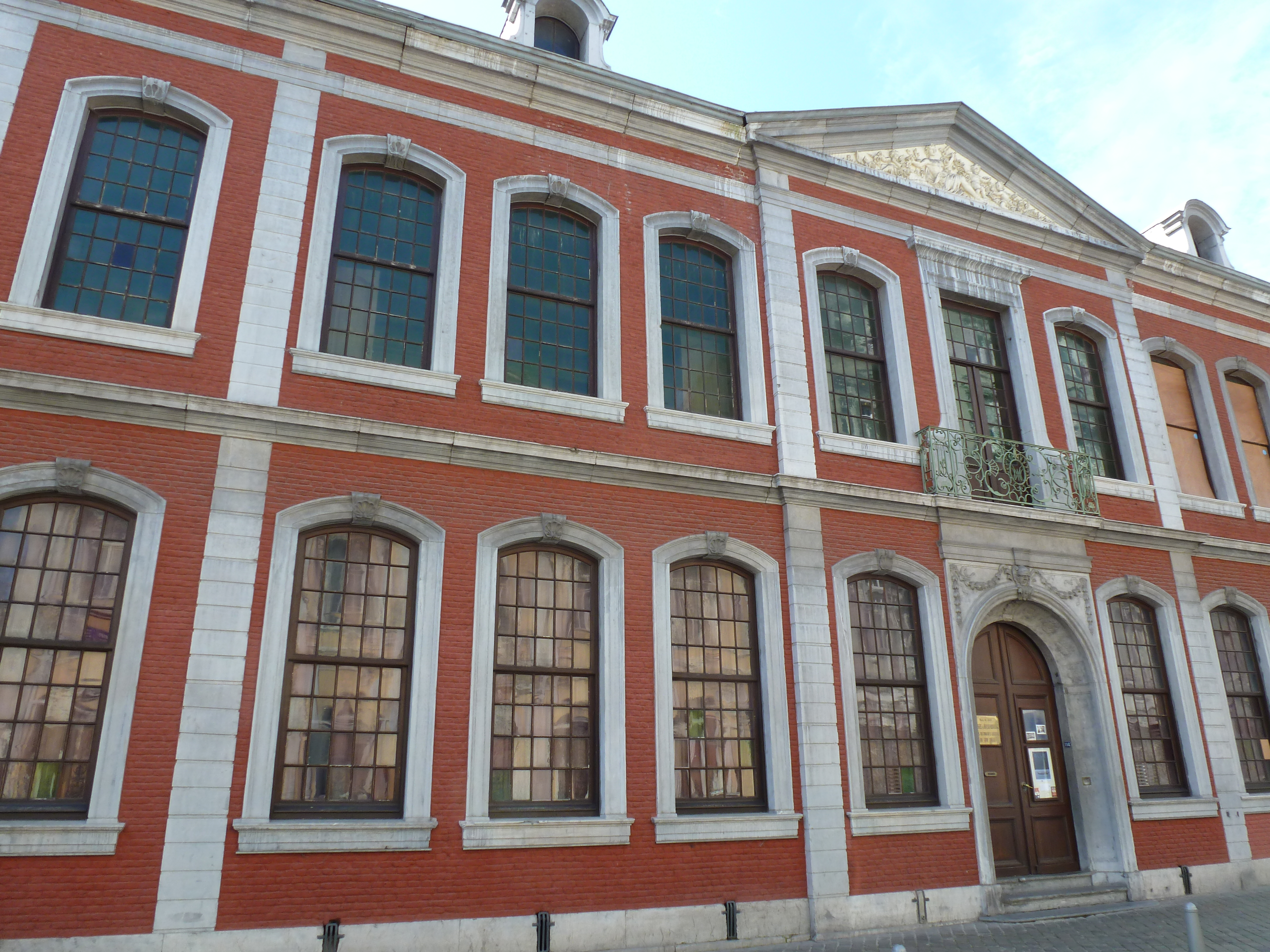
- Hôtel d'Ansembourg
- Interactive map of the Hôtel d'Ansembourg area

General information
- Location: Liège, Belgium
- Coordinates: 50°39′N 5°35′E
- Construction started: 1738
- Completed: 1741

The Hôtel d'Ansembourg (French pronunciation: [otɛl dɑ̃sɑ̃buʁ]) is a former Baroque hôtel particulier in Liège, Belgium, located between Féronstrée and quai de Maestricht.

== History ==
It was built between 1738 and 1741 as Hôtel Willems to designs by Johann Joseph Couven, though the decoration took a few more years to complete. The foundry formerly on the site (part of the collégiale Saint-Barthélemy) was demolished to make way for it. It was built by and for the rich Eupenois banker and merchant Michel Willems and his family. He mainly made his fortune as a merchant in 'Cordoba leather' (leather gilded at Malines) in Verviers, then as a banker, particularly to the prince-bishops of Liège.

In 1780 Willem's son Nicolas retired to Amstenrade Castle, which he largely rebuilt, and eight years later he died without issue, leaving the hôtel and his other properties to the daughter of his sister Marie-Anne-Victoire de Hayme de Bomal1, wife of count Joseph-Romain de Marchant d'Ansembourg, nephew of François-Charles de Velbruck, prince-bishop. This meant the building was rechristened the Hôtel d'Ansembourg. Damaged in 1794 following the Liège Revolution, the building was seized and sold off to another family. The city council bought it in March 1903 and it was restored by Joseph Lousberg before being opened to the public as the Ansembourg Museum on 10 September 1905.

== Sources ==
- (in French) Christine Renardy, Liège et l'Exposition universelle de 1905, La Renaissance du livre, 2005, 318 p. (ISBN 2874154954)
