= Ansembourg Museum =

- Musée d'Ansembourg
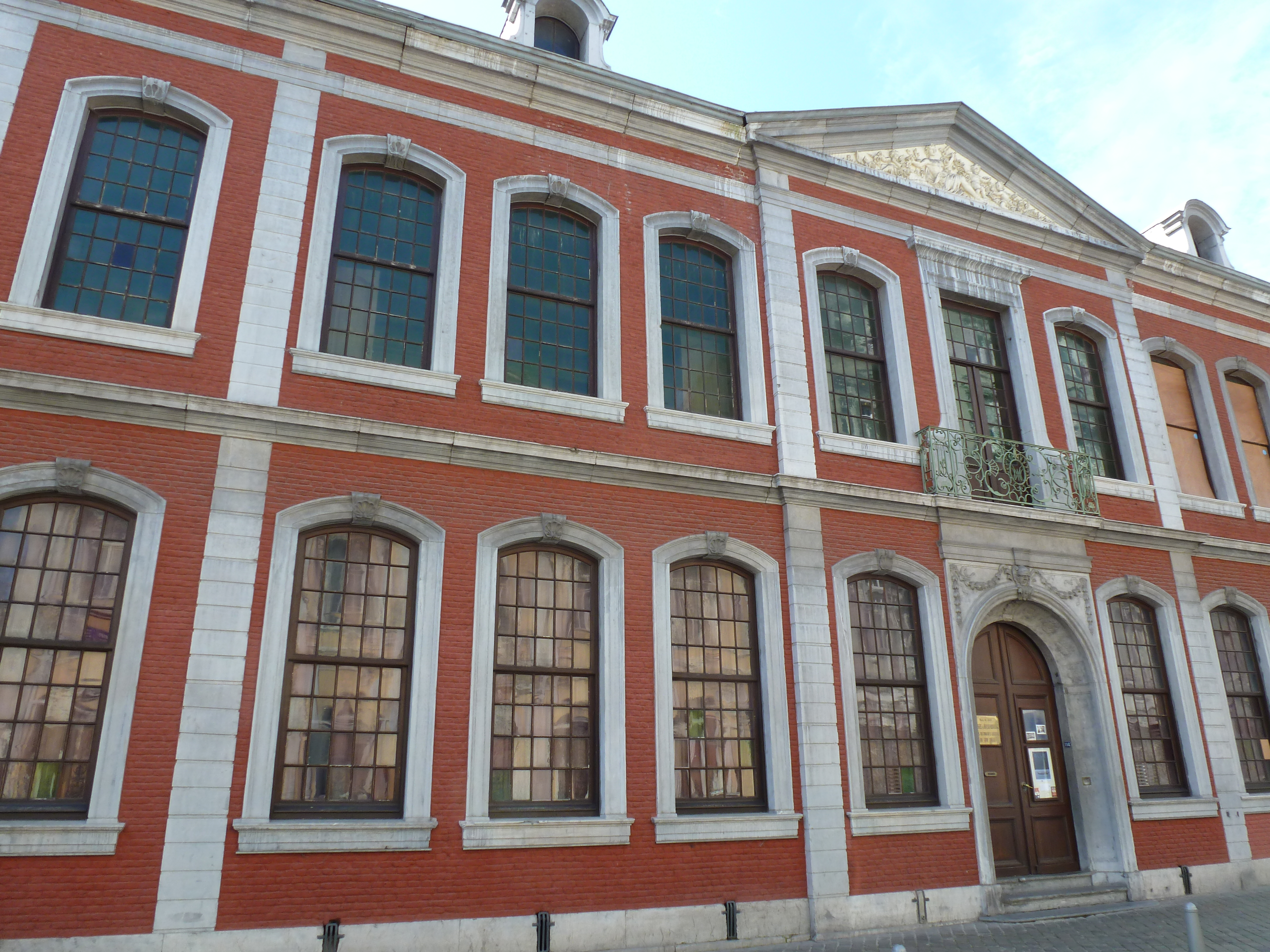
- Coordinates: 50°38′49″N 5°34′56″E
- Website: lesmuseesdeliege.be/ansembourg/

The Ansembourg Museum (Musée d'Ansembourg, [myze dɑ̃sɑ̃buʁ]) is a museum in the Belgian city of Liège. It is housed in the hôtel d'Ansembourg on Féronstrée in the historic heart of the city.

== History ==
Its collections originated as part of those of the Institut archéologique liégeois (IAL), founded on 4 April 1850. Its archaeological and decorative arts collections were displayed in the Prince-Bishops' Palace, then in the university library, then in l'Émulation (the headquarters of the Société libre d'émulation, a literary, artistic, and scientific society), and finally in a gallery solely devoted to the IAL's collections in one of the wings of the Palace on 12 October 1874.

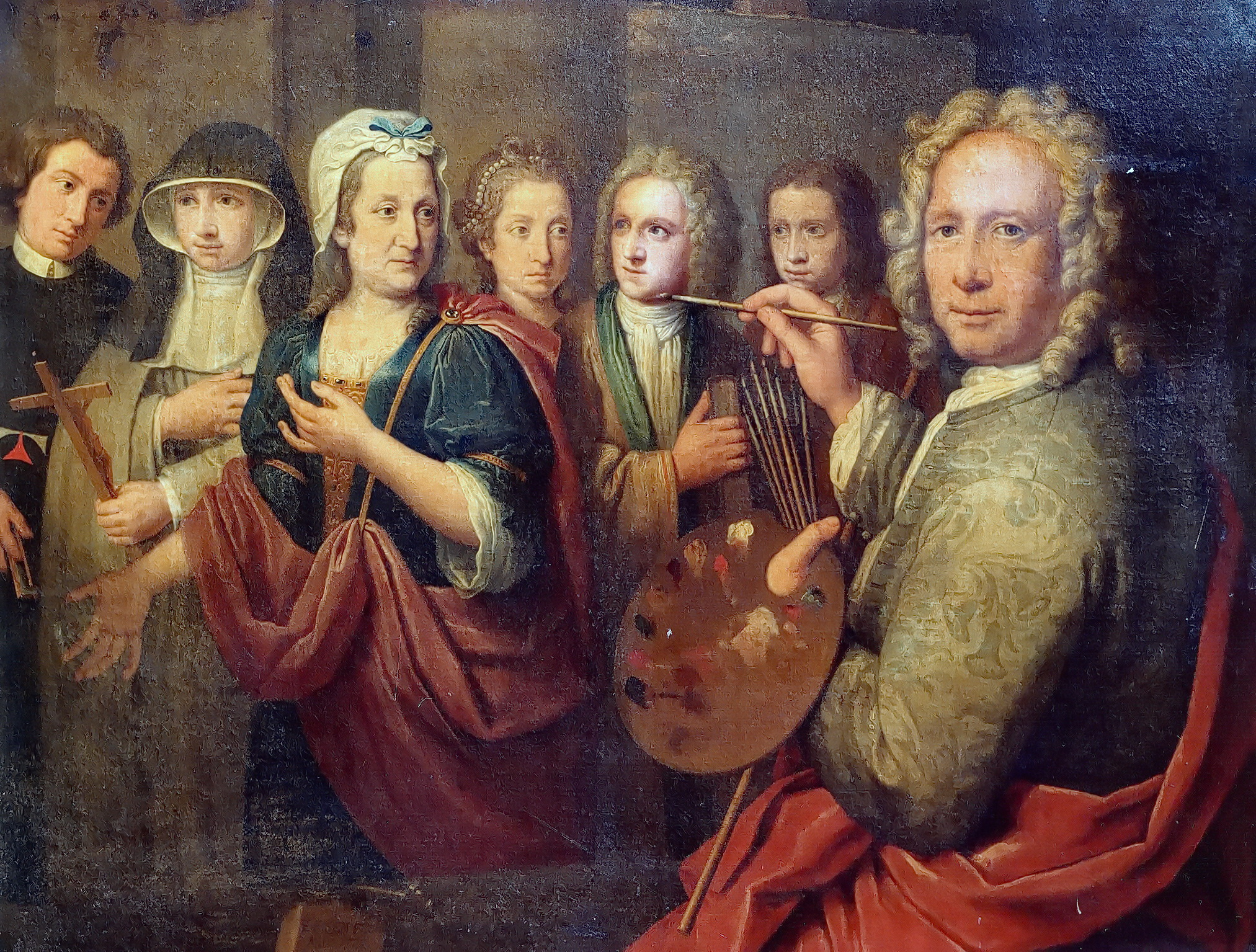
Fisen, Portrait of the artist and his family, 1722

In 1901, the city council and the IAL acquired the Curtius Palace to house the city's archaeological and decorative arts collections; the archaeology and some of the decorative arts objects are still on display there as the Curtius Museum. On 12 February 1903 the city council bought the hôtel d'Ansembourg, which it restored and opened on 10 July 1905 as a museum of 18th-century decorative arts, especially furniture.

The museum owns one of the most important collections of furniture in the Liège-Aachen Style, a regional variant of Baroque furniture art. They are displayed in period rooms of different eras. The museum also has an important collection of 17th–19th century paintings, sculptures, and drawings by Gérard de Lairesse, Nicolaas Verkolje, Jean-Baptiste Coclers, Théodore-Edmond Plumier (Portrait of Prince William of Hesse, 1720), Englebert Fisen (including a self portrait), Louis-Michel van Loo, Léonard Defrance (Women Drinking Coffee, 1763), Jean Delcour (Madonna and Child), and Louis-Félix Rhénasteine.

== See also ==
- Liège–Aachen Baroque furniture
- Baroque in Prince-Bishopric of Liège
- Couven Museum in Aachen, Germany
- Museum aan het Vrijthof in Maastricht, Netherlands
- Koninklijke Musea voor Kunst en Geschiedenis (KMKG) in Brussels, Belgium

== Bibliography ==
- (in French) Joseph Philippe, «Peinture décorative et polychromie liégeoises du xviiie siècle. Découvertes récentes et traitement au Musée d'Ansembourg», La vie liégeoise, no 11, novembre 1978, p. 3–9
