= Rue d'Alsace-Lorraine =

Rue d'Alsace-Lorraine, avenue d'Alsace-Lorraine, or boulevard d'Alsace-Lorraine refer to:

== Belgium ==
- Rue d'Alsace-Lorraine (Ixelles).

== France ==
=== Avenues ===
- Avenue Alsace-Lorraine (Grenoble);
- Avenue Alsace-Lorraine (Toulon).

=== Boulevards ===
- Boulevard d'Alsace-Lorraine (Le Perreux-sur-Marne);
- Boulevard Alsace-Lorraine (Rosny-sous-Bois).

=== Streets ===
- Rue d'Alsace-Lorraine (Lyon);
- Rue d'Alsace-Lorraine (Nice);
- Rue d'Alsace-Lorraine (Orléans);
- Rue d'Alsace-Lorraine (Paris);
- Rue Alsace-Lorraine (Rouen);
- Rue Alsace-Lorraine (Saintes);
- Rue d'Alsace-Lorraine (Toulouse);
- Rue d'Alsace-Lorraine (Vesoul).
