= Féronstrée =

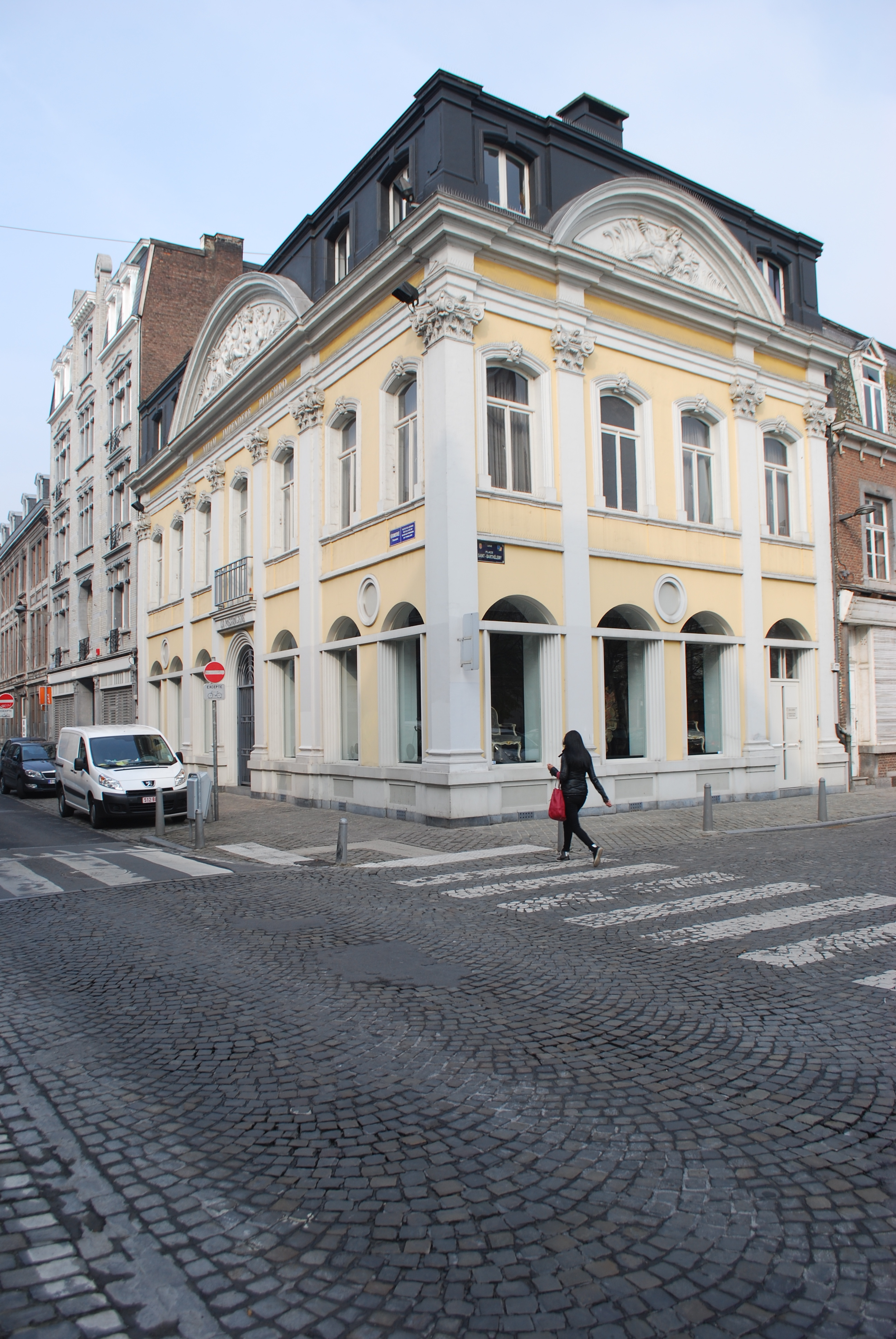
A house on Féronstrée

Féronstrée (Liègean Walloon - È Fèronstrèye) is a major street in central Liège, connecting Place du Marché to Place des Déportés. Its name originates from the ironworkers (ferronniers) who were once based on there. Historically, it was also known as Grand'rue. The street is home to several notable landmarks, including the Ansembourg Museum, Curtius Museum, Bibliothèque Ulysse Capitaine and St Bartholomew's Church. In 1106, Henry IV, Holy Roman Emperor died at what is now No. 6 Féronstrée.

== Bibliography ==
- (in French) Théodore Gobert, Liège à travers les âges, Liège, Georges Thone, 1924 and 1930, 3rd and 4th editions., 6 quarto volumes (1st and 2nd editions 1884 and 1901 under the title Les rues de Liége, 4 quarto volumes) (OCLC 645720856)
