= Maastricht silver =

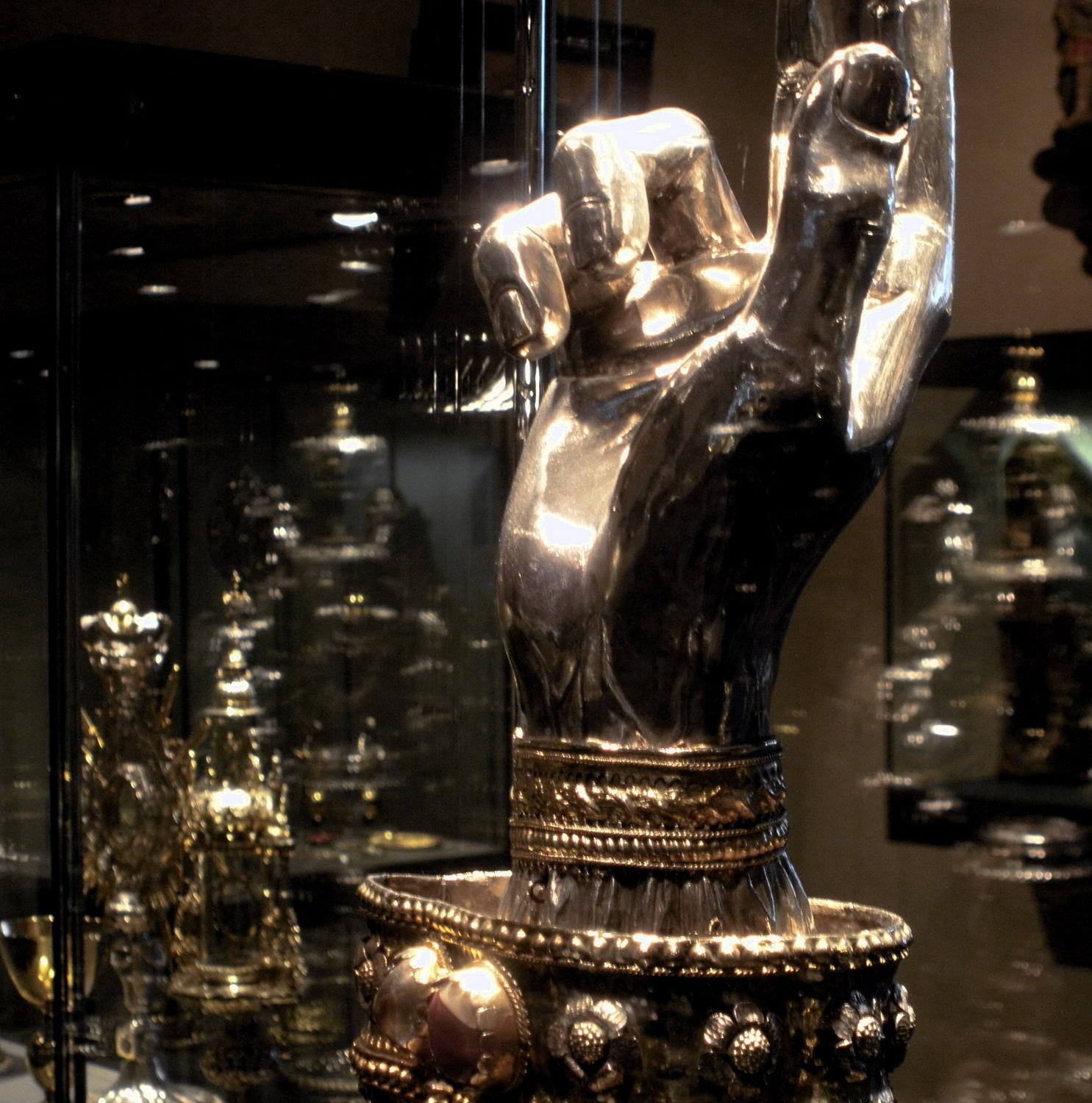
Detail of reliquary arm of St Thomas (Maastricht silver, ±1450). Treasury of the Basilica of Saint Servatius, Maastricht

Maastricht silver is a collective name for silver objects produced in Maastricht, Netherlands, mainly in the 17th and 18th centuries, when the town was a major centre for silversmithing.

== History ==
In Maastricht, from the 16th century until the early 19th century a considerable number of silversmiths were active. They were united in the guild of Saint Eligius, which via the apprentice tradition controlled the transmission of tools and techniques from generation to generation. The silver-working guild checked each piece of silver before it was stamped with three silver hallmarks: The city hallmark, a five-pointed star, indicated the quality of the silver guaranteed by the town of Maastricht. A second hallmark, the year letter, indicated the bi-annual period it was made in. The third hallmark was the mark of the silversmith.

The oldest known piece stamped with the Maastricht hallmark is the so-called arm of Saint Thomas, a 15th-century silver reliquary in the shape of an arm, now in the Treasury of the Basilica of Saint Servatius in Maastricht. Unfortunately, very little is left from this period. After the Siege of Maastricht (1579) the Spanish troops ransacked the city for three days and took anything made of gold or silver. Some silver chalices and monstrances from the 17th century have survived. With the arrival of the French revolutionary troops in 1794, the medieval trade system was discarded of and the guild of Saint Eligius dissolved.

== Collections ==
The Museum aan het Vrijthof in Maastricht has the most comprehensive collection of Maastricht silver, although not nearly as complete as one would like to see. However, here one is able to discern the development of the craftsmanship throughout the various Louis styles of the 18th century. In 2012, the recently re-opened museum staged an exhibition of Maastricht silver.

The Bonnefanten Museum and the treasuries of the Basilica of Our Lady and the Basilica of Saint Servatius, all in Maastricht, as well as a number of museums, churches and private collectors in the Netherlands and around the world, own pieces of Maastricht silver.

== Gallery ==
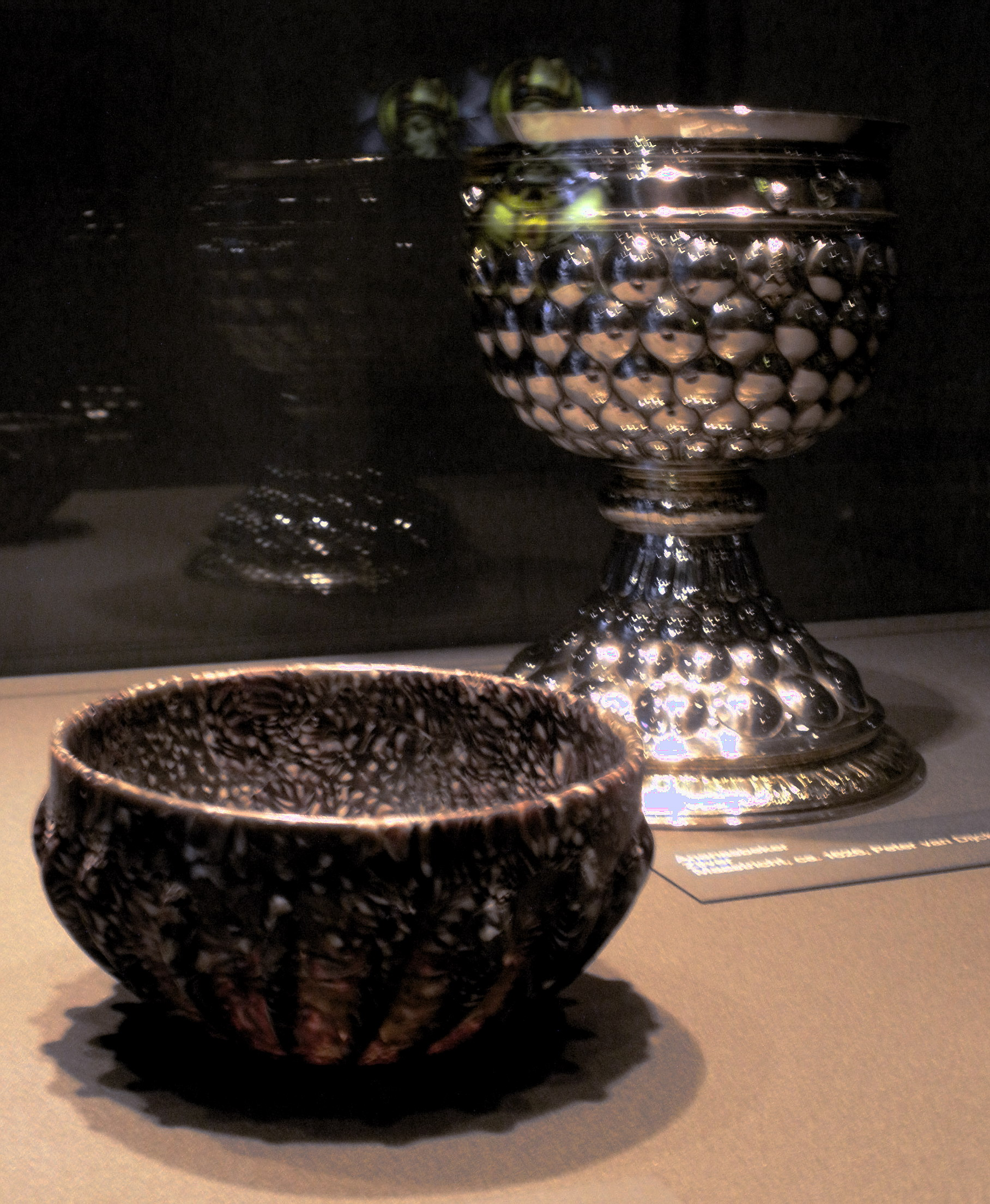
'Pineapple cup', Petrus van Dijck (1626/27). Treasury Basilica Saint Servatius

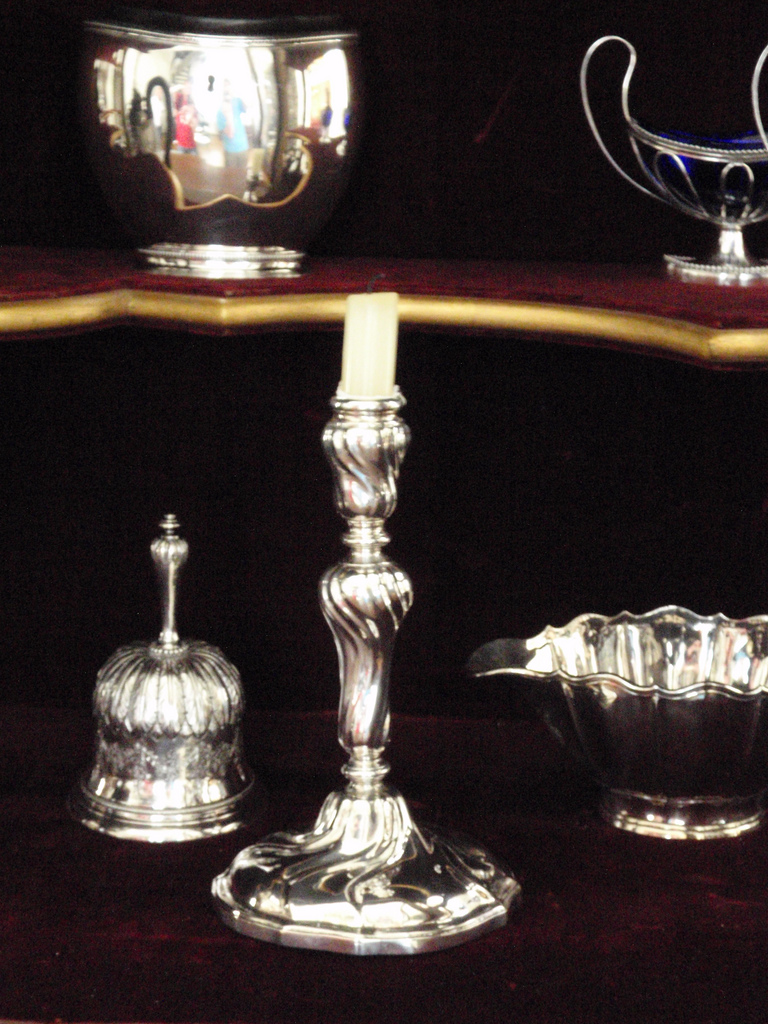
Table bell, candle stick and other objects, Museum aan het Vrijthof

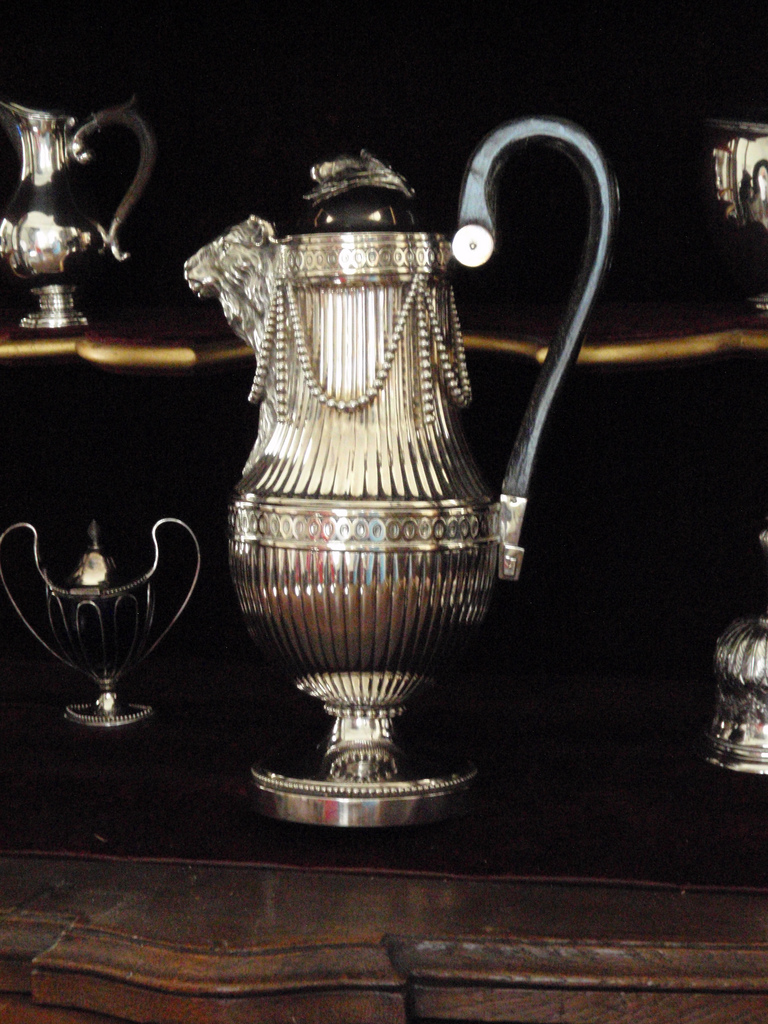
Jug, Joseph Balthazar Eymael (1786/1788). Museum aan het Vrijthof

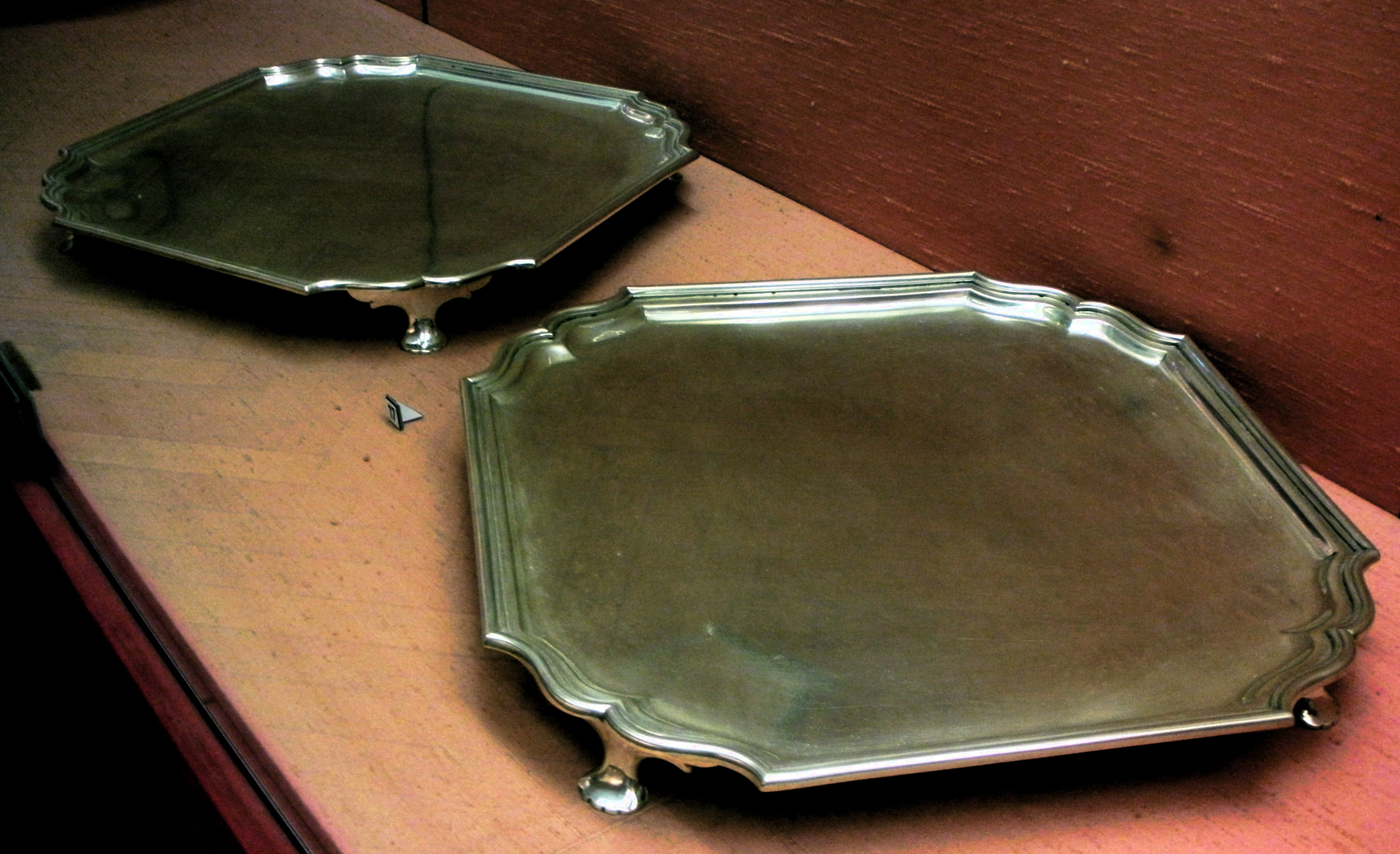
Silver plates (±1794). Royal Museums of Art and History, Brussels

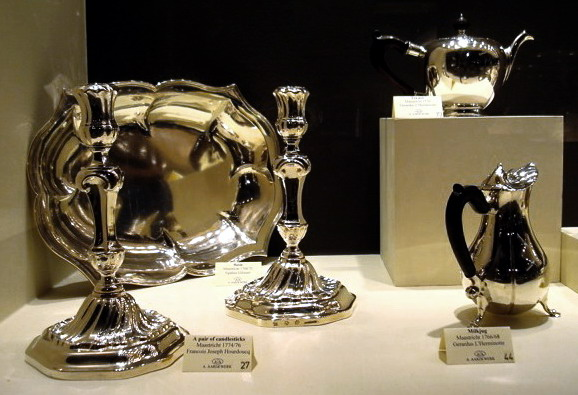
Maastricht silver, for sale at TEFAF in 2011

== Bibliography ==
- Kerckhoffs, P.A.E., J. Luijt, Duurzame Glans (Exhibition Catalogue Museum aan het Vrijthof). Baarn, 2012
- Szénássy, I.L. (ed.), Maastrichts Zilver (Exhibition Catalogue Bonnefanten Museum). Maastricht, 1978
