= Fotomuseum aan het Vrijthof =

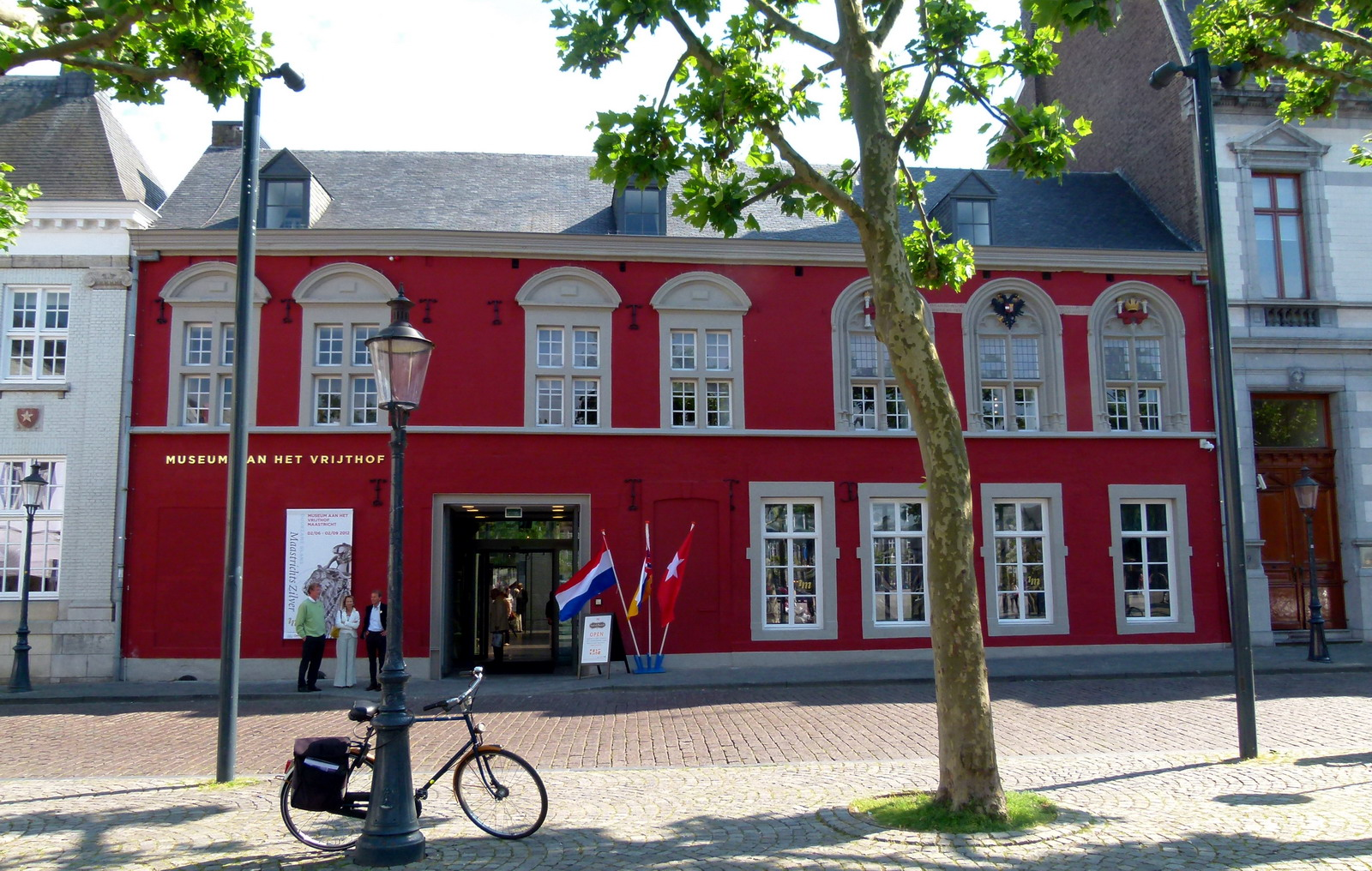
- Established: 1973
- Location: Vrijthof 18, Maastricht, Netherlands
- Coordinates: 50°50′54″N 5°41′20″E
- Director: Erik de Jong
- Website: www.museumaanhetvrijthof.nl

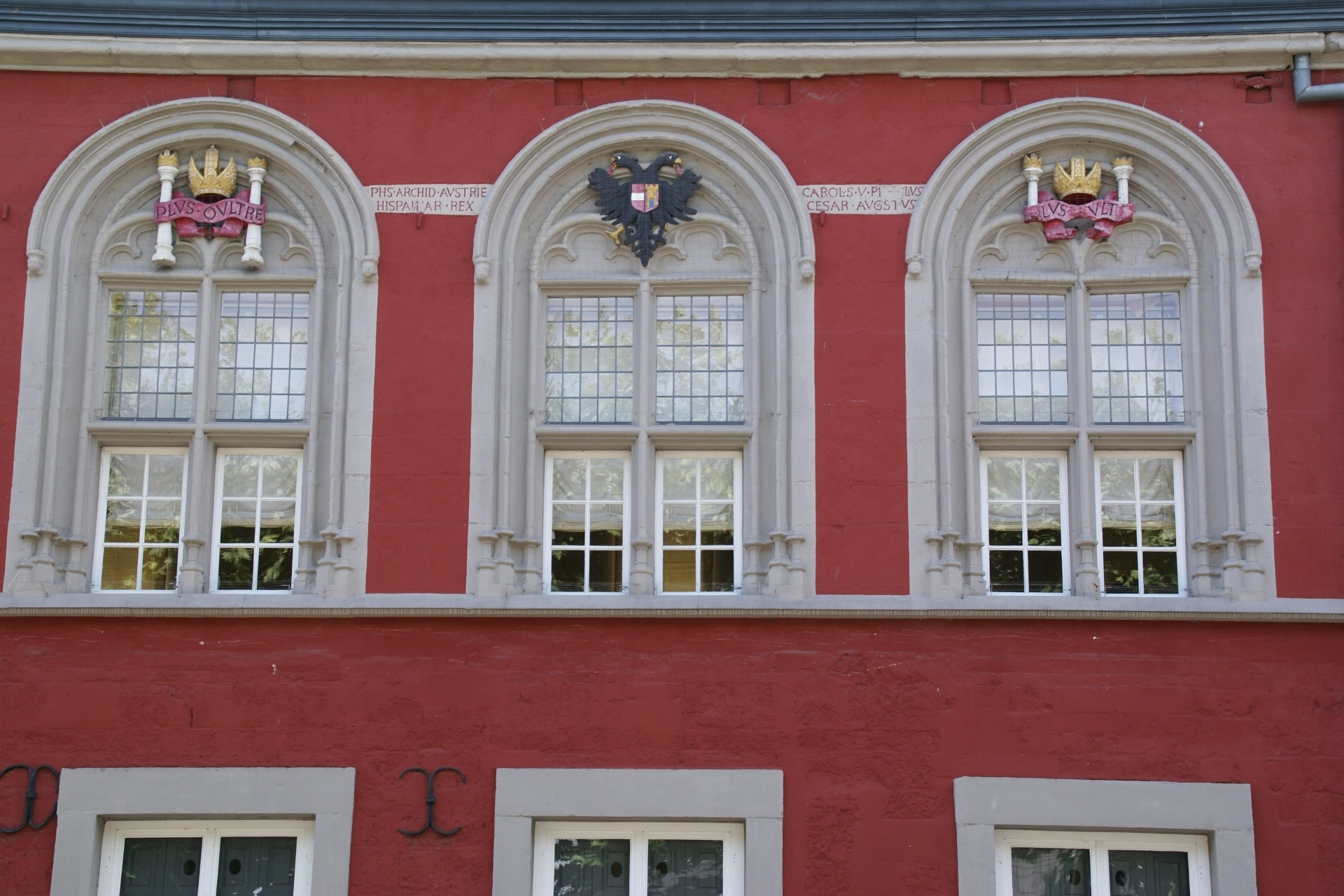
Late Gothic windows with emblems of Charles V

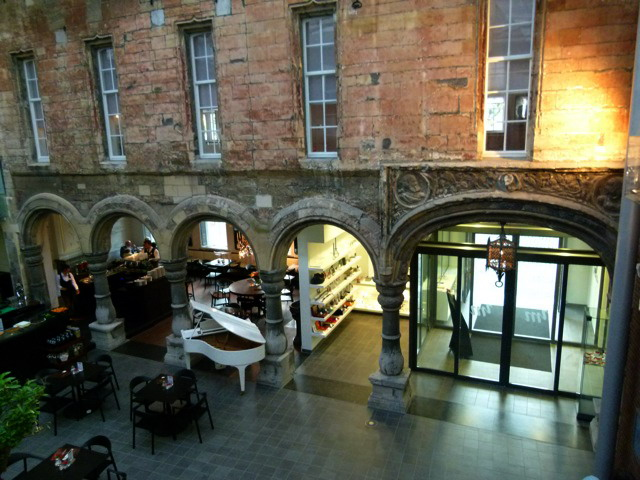
Renaissance arcade with portrait medallions

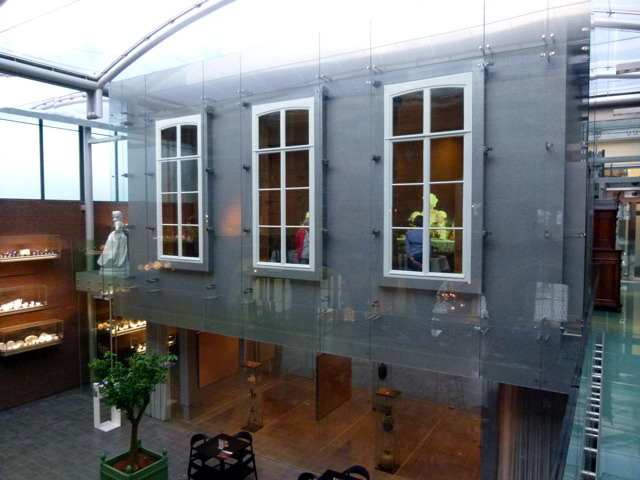
Courtyard with TEFAF pavillon

The Fotomuseum aan het Vrijthof (previously: Museum aan het Vrijthof and Museum Spaans Gouvernement) is a museum of photography in Maastricht, Netherlands.

== History of the building ==
The museum is housed in the so-called Spanish Government building, one of the oldest non-religious buildings in Maastricht, facing the city's main square, Vrijthof. The building was originally part of the ecclesiastical territory of the chapter of the church of Saint Servatius and was probably built for one of the chapter's canons. In the early 16th century the house was rebuilt and enlarged. At that time the facade on the ground floor was largely blind, except for an arched gateway that led into the courtyard. The three late Gothic windows on the first floor date from this period. Two of them show the pillars of Hercules and the motto of Charles V, Holy Roman Emperor: 'Plus ultra'. The third window, in the middle, carries the symbols of Habsburg power: the double-headed eagle with the coat of arms of Habsburg and Castile.

A little later, an arcade in Liège Renaissance style was added on the side of the courtyard which bears similarity to the architecture of the main courtyard of the Prince-Bishops' Palace in Liège. The colonnade frieze has three sculpted medallions with the portraits of (probably) Charles V, his wife Isabella of Portugal and their son Philip II of Spain, who stayed here at several occasions. It was probably here that Alexander Farnese, Duke of Parma and Governor of the Netherlands, signed the declaration that made William the Silent, leader of the Dutch Revolt, an outlaw. It was during this period that the building acquired its name Spanish Government building (Dutch: Spaans Gouvernement).

In the 18th and 19th centuries the interior of the building was altered several times. It was during this time that extra windows were put in place on the ground floor. In 1766, the Parisian printer and editor Jean-Edmé Dufour bought the building and used it as a print shop. It was from here that many books prohibited in France were smuggled into the country.

In 1913 the building was publicly sold. Part of it was demolished and replaced in 1923 by a building that is now in use as a bank (corner St Jacobstraat). The rest of the building was restored by Victor de Stuers and presented to the city of Maastricht in order to house a local history museum (which did not happen until recently). From 1969 to 1973, and again from 2010 to 2012, thorough restorations took place.

== The museum ==
In 1954, the wealthy The Hague couple Frederik Wagner and Ambrosina de Wit bequeathed their art collection to a foundation based in the city of Maastricht. Since 1973 the Wagner-De Wit collection has been on display in what was then called Museum Spaans Gouvernement. The pavilion room in the courtyard was specifically built to house valuable boiseries from a demolished 18th-century Maastricht mansion. Some of the period rooms decorated in the so-called Liège Régence style, are used for functions.

From 2010 to 2012 the museum closed for renovations and extensions. The renovation included a partial restoration of the originally largely blind facade of the Spanish Government building. The extension consisted of adding a neighbouring building to the museum's exhibition space, as well as roofing over the courtyard. The enlarged museum is now about two and a half times bigger than the old premises. The museum re-opened in March 2012 with some rooms dedicated to important figures from Maastricht history, e.g. the emperor Charles V, the printer Jean-Edmé Dufour, the architect Mathias Soiron, the entrepreneur Petrus Regout and the draughtsman Philippe van Gulpen. Exhibitions focussed on local arts and crafts, e.g. Maastricht silver and Maastricht pistols. From 2014 the emphasis shifted to local and regional artist from the late 19th and early 20th century. In 2019, the museum announced that it would only show photography from then on. Subsequently, it changed its name to Fotomuseum aan het Vrijthof.

Museum aan het Vrijthof is a private museum that receives no government funding. In 2011, TEFAF became a major sponsor. In honour of this, the museum renamed one of the period rooms TEFAF-zaal.

== The collection ==
The museum's original collection consisted of the Wagner-De Wit bequest and some later acquisitions. The collection, brought together by the artistic couple, contained art and artifacts from a wide array of periods and regions, some of which has been discarded by the current directors. The emphasis in the collection was on Dutch and Flemish painting from the 17th century (Dirck van Baburen, Willem de Poorter, Adriaen van de Venne, Cornelius van Poelenburgh, Johannes Lingelbach, Egbert van der Poel, Nicolaes Moeyaert, Nicolaes Berchem, Lodewijk de Vadder, Jacques d'Arthois, Pieter Casteels III) and paintings from the Hague School (Jozef Israëls, Jan Hendrik Weissenbruch, Willem Bastiaan Tholen, George Hendrik Breitner and the brothers Jacob, Matthijs and Willem Maris). The Wagner-De Wit collection also included sculpture from the Middle Ages and Renaissance period, tapestries and furniture from the 16th, 17th and 18th centuries, glass and crystal objects, antique coins, and artifacts from the Far East.

Most of the objects collected by Frederik Wagner and Ambrosina de Wit have not been seen for decades. As several paintings from the collection appeared in auctions around 2010–2013, it is likely that these were sold to fund the renovation and expansion of the building. The museum does not provide any information on this subject and being a private association it is not bound to.

Over the years, the collection expanded to include Maastricht silver from the 18th century (some on loan from the Bonnefantenmuseum), Maastricht and Liège pistols from the 18th and 19th centuries, and some Maastricht paintings from the early 20th century. Since 1997 the Bonhomme-Tielens bequest (antique clocks and Maastricht silver) was part of the museum collection. It is not clear what has happened to this part of the collection, as the museum shows exclusively photography since 2019.

The museum does not have a photography collection of its own. All exhibitions consist of loans.

== See also ==
- Liège–Aachen Baroque furniture
- Baroque in Prince-Bishopric of Liège
- Ansembourg Museum in Liège, Belgium
- Grand Curtius in Liège, Belgium
- Couven Museum in Aachen, Germany
- Koninklijke Musea voor Kunst en Geschiedenis (KMKG) in Brussels, Belgium

== Bibliography ==
- Timmers, J.J.M., Geschiedenis van het Spaans Gouvernement te Maastricht. Maastricht, 1973
