= Couven Museum =

Museum in Aachen, Germany

Coordinates: 50°46′33″N 6°05′05″E

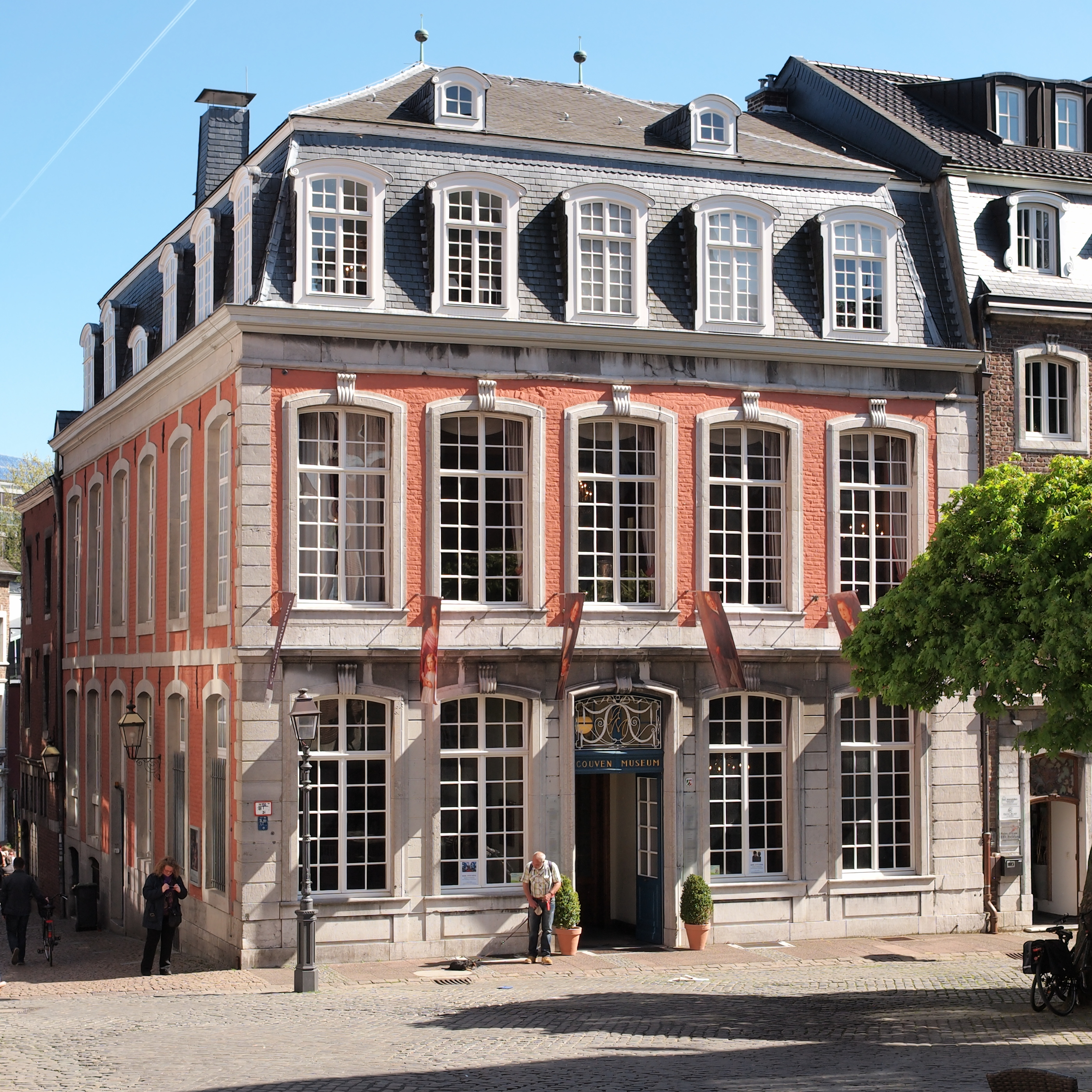
The Couven Museum on the Hühnermarkt in Aachen.

The Couven Museum is a museum in the city centre of Aachen, western Germany. Since 1958, it is housed in the Monheim house, a 17th-century pharmacy, that was redesigned by the architect Jakob Couven in 1786. Several period rooms in Directoire, Empire and Biedermeier styles are on display, as well as the historic pharmacy, kitchen and a collection of faience tiles.

== Discover the Couven Museum: A Treasured Gem of Aachen's Heritage ==
=== A Brief History ===
The Couven Museum, housed in a building dating back to 1662 originally known as ‘Haus Monheim,’ has a storied past. Extensive renovations were conducted from 1737 to 1750 under the guidance of Johann Joseph Couven, a celebrated Baroque architect, after whom the museum is named. In 1968, the city of Aachen acquired the building and repurposed it as a museum, focusing on regional interior design styles from the Rococo, Louis Seize (Louis XVI), Directoire, Empire, and Biedermeier periods.

==== Architectural Splendor ====
Visitors to the Couven Museum are greeted by its striking Rhenish rococo architecture. Inside, the museum boasts a variety of architectural elements that have been carefully restored or recreated to represent different historical styles accurately. Features range from ornate stucco ceilings in Rococo style rooms to the more subdued neoclassical designs.

==== Furniture Collection ====
The museum's collection of period furniture, primarily sourced from local artisans and dating from the mid-18th to mid-19th centuries, highlights the daily lives and styles of past eras. These pieces provide insights into historical decor preferences, daily routines, and even societal norms of the time, such as distinct living areas for men and women.

==== Pharmacy Museum ====
A notable highlight within the Couven Museum is the fully restored 18th-century pharmacy. This exhibit features an array of pharmaceutical equipment, medicine jars, and old remedies, offering a peek into the medical practices of the era. The authentic wooden shelving and counters enhance the historical atmosphere of the pharmacy.

==== Educational Programs ====
The museum offers a variety of educational programs for both children and adults. These programs include guided tours that explain the historical context of the museum's rooms and collections, workshops on traditional crafts like candle making or soap production, and storytelling sessions that animate history for younger audiences.

== See also ==
- Liège–Aachen Baroque furniture
- Baroque in Prince-Bishopric of Liège
- Ansembourg Museum in Liège, Belgium
- Grand Curtius in Liège, Belgium
- Museum aan het Vrijthof in Maastricht, Netherlands
- Koninklijke Musea voor Kunst en Geschiedenis (KMKG) in Brussels, Belgium
- Rotes Haus (Monschau)
