= Englebert Fisen =

Flemish painter (1655–1733)

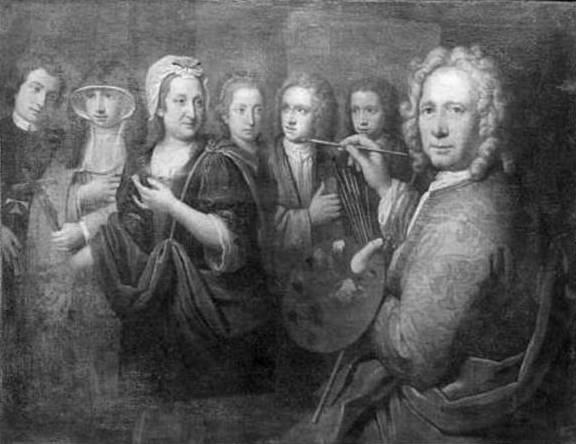
Self-portrait with family, 1722, now in the Musée d'Ansembourg, Liège

Englebert Fisen (1655 – 15 April 1733) was a Flemish painter and a pupil of Bertholet Flemalle.

Fisen was born at Liège. When still very young he went to Italy, where he studied under Carlo Maratti, whose style he imitated. After eight years he returned to his native city, where his principal pictures are a Crucifixion, painted for the chapel of the H6tel-de-Ville; and a Martyrdom of St. Bartholomew, and a Christ on the Cross, painted for the church of St. Bartholomew. He died at Liège.

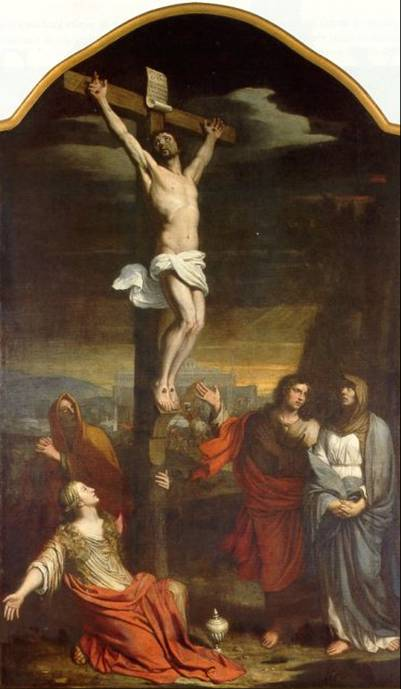
Golgotha, 1684, now in the St Bartholomew's Church, Liège

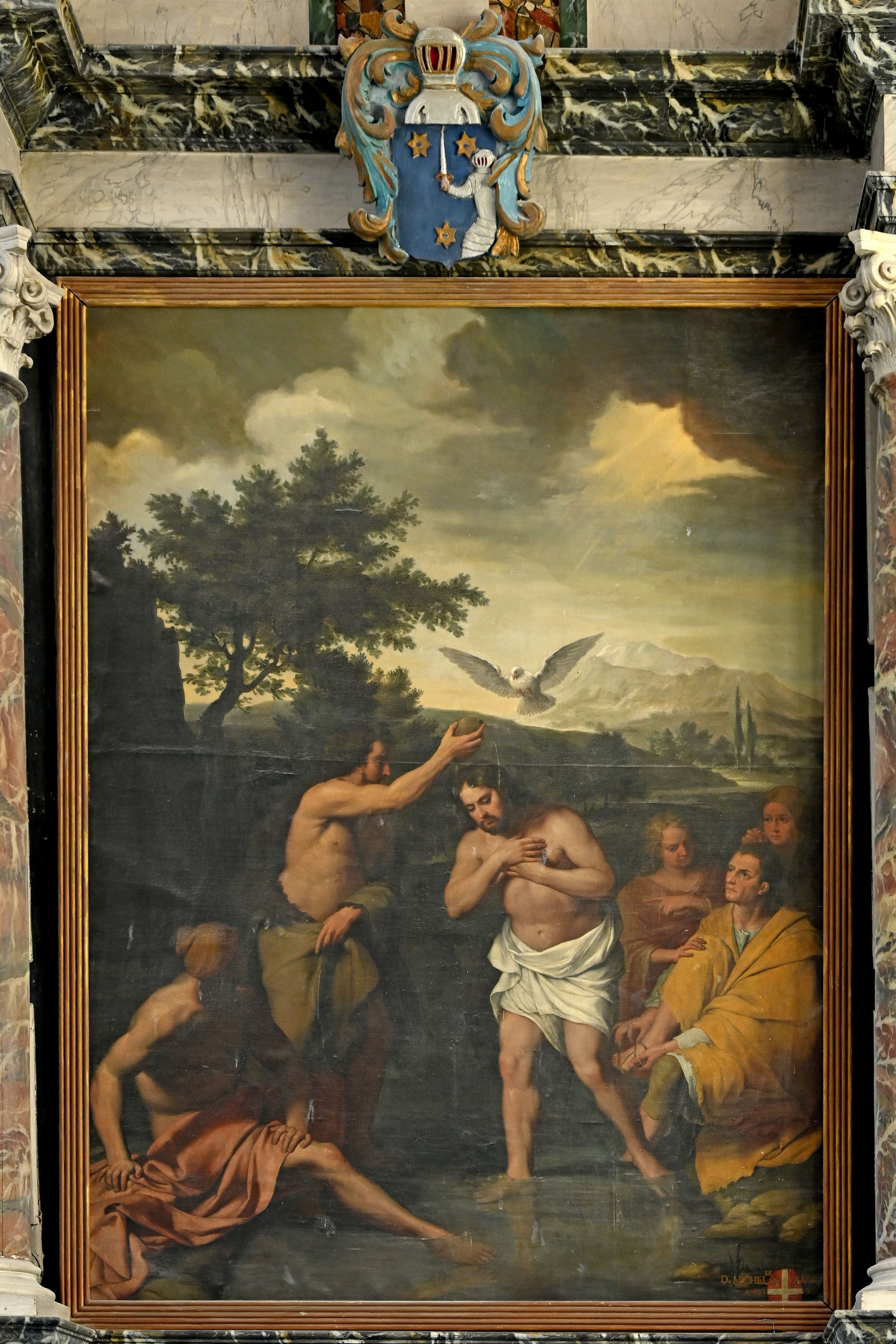
‘The Baptism of Christ’, 1685

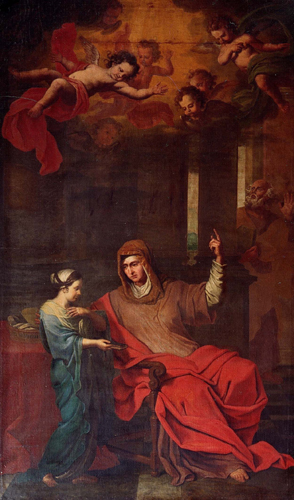
The Virgin Mary educated by Saint Anne
