= Rue Alsace-Lorraine, Saintes =

French street

Rue Alsace-Lorraine
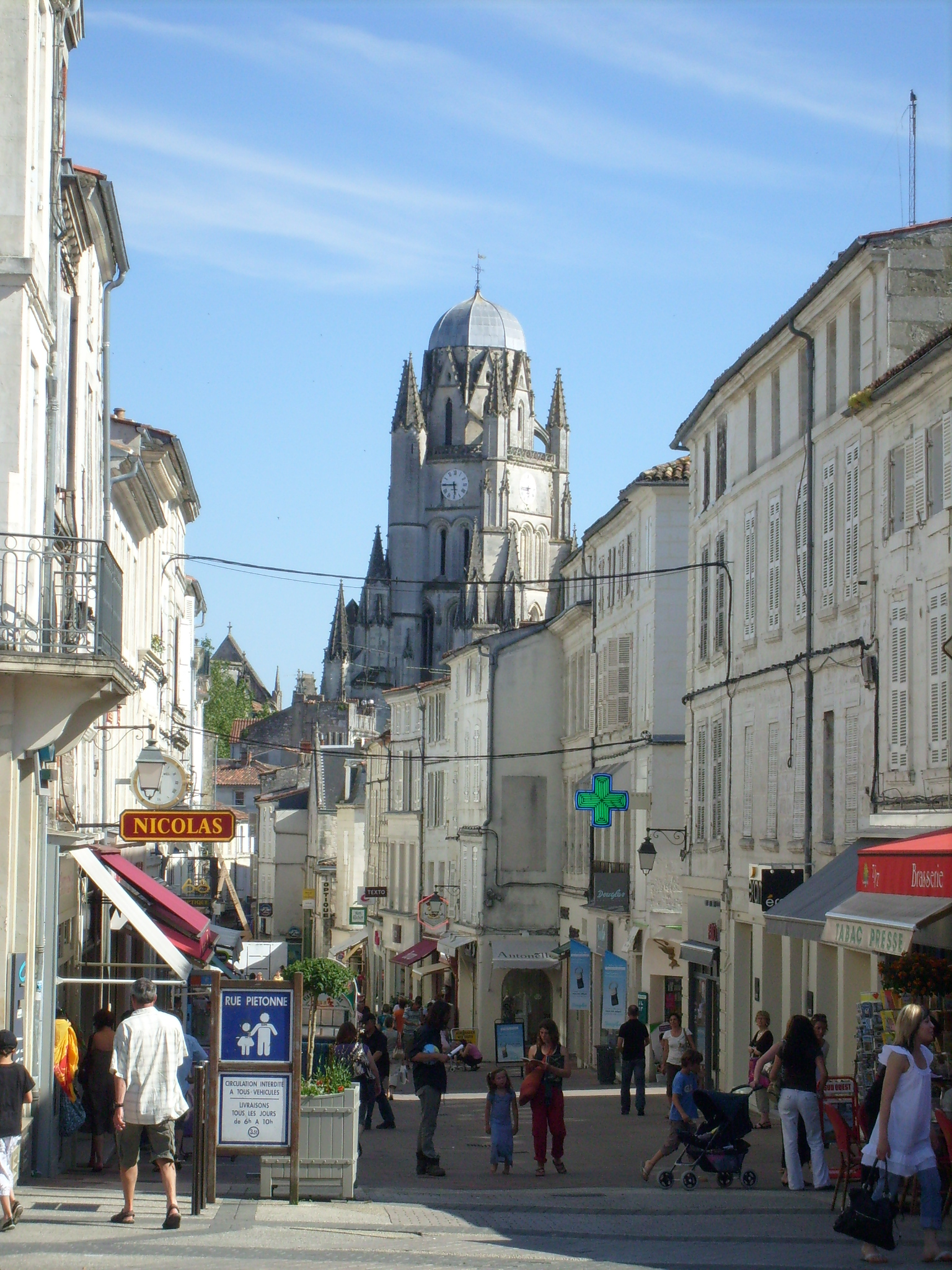
- Rue Alsace-Lorraine, in the heart of the historic center
- Type: Street
- Location: Saintes
- Quarter: Saint-Pierre
- Coordinates: 45°44′45″N 0°37′44″W

Rue Alsace-Lorraine (French pronunciation: [ʁy alzas lɔʁɛn]) is a pedestrian thoroughfare in the French commune of Saintes, in the Charente-Maritime department.

== Location and access ==
With the cours National and avenue Gambetta, it concentrates nearly 60% of the shops in the city center and is an essential stopover for anyone traveling through the old district.

It is today integrated into an architectural, urban and landscape heritage protection zone covering an area of nearly 880 hectares. Several pedestrian streets are connected to this major axis, traces of which can be found as early as 1560 (see Braun's map).

== Origin of the name ==
This street owes its name to the memory of Alsace–Lorraine, provinces lost at the end of the war of 1870 and returned to France by the Treaty of Versailles on 28 June 1919.

== History ==
Despite a picturesque appearance highlighted by a few old residences (one of which retains traces of half-timbering, the only testimony to a method of construction once very widespread in Saintes), rue Alsace-Lorraine was completely redesigned in 18th century as part of an urban plan implemented by the intendants Auget de Montyon and Guéau de Reverseaux. If many old houses were simply demolished, for others the reconstruction was only partial, sometimes limited to the construction of a stone facade « veneered » on an older home.

Although it is only an appearance, all of the residences lining the street seem relatively coherent, symptomatic of the desire to « clean up » a city described at the end of the old regime as « a poor town » whose « streets are narrow and houses poorly built ».

Counting among the first projects aimed at transforming the city, the redevelopment of this axis is bearing fruit, to the point that a testimony dating from the beginning of the 19th century mentions houses « all renovated for sixty years » and that the famous scholar Charles Dangibeaud wrote a few decades later that « the proportion of houses from the second half of the 18th century is so high that one would believe, at first glance, that Saintes had been completely rebuilt after a tremendous catastrophe ».

Rue Alsace-Lorraine has been known since the Middle Ages. Long known as « rue porte Aiguière », it forms a north/south oriented thoroughfare linking Porte Aiguière (one of the main fortified gates of the medieval town) to the episcopal district, grouped around the cathedral, the cloister, the manecanterie, the episcopal palace and the Hôtel-Dieu. Numerous small squares, called « cantons », punctuate its course and are places of life and commerce. Among these were the cantons of Forges (at rue Victor-Hugo) and Pantecoste or Trois-Maries (current Place de l'Échevinage).

As in most cities at that time, hygiene remained a major problem and several edicts attempted to overcome local residents who, for ease, willingly dumped chamber pots and other rubbish on the streets. These practices are not without consequences here as elsewhere, in the wake of sporadic epidemics, in particular the black death and cholera. As for the porte Aiguière (formerly located as an extension of the street), manure and other materials used to fertilize the fields were dumped near it, the odors emanating from it earning it the unflattering nickname of « porte Merderia ».

It was not until the last third of the 18th century that this situation finally evolved favorably, that the street was redeveloped and the ramparts destroyed.

Becoming rue Alsace-Lorraine following the armistice of 1918, this important shopping street did not suffer from the "renovation" policy undertaken in the 1960s (destruction of old streets, the Jesuit chapel, the market halls, the house of Dr Guillotin) but was on the contrary integrated into a pedestrian district in the 1980s. The pedestrianization of the historic center was implemented in stages: the upper part of rue Alsace-Lorraine (from cours national to rue Victor Hugo) was prohibited to vehicles every Saturday afternoon from 1973. In 1981, the lower part (from rue Victor Hugo to Place Saint-Pierre) became completely pedestrian, and in 1983, the entire axis was exclusively reserved for pedestrians. It is also now included in an architectural, urban and landscape heritage protection zone of approximately 880 hectares.

Connecting the Esplanade du Maréchal-Foch (square du palais de la justice) and the Place du Synode (in front of Saint-Pierre cathedral), it retains numerous facades in the Louis XV, Louis XVI or, more rarely, Directoire style. At the corner of rue Alsace-Lorraine and rue des Jacobins stands the only example of a half timbered house remaining in Saintes. Behind facades almost completely redone in the 18th century, much older residences are sometimes hidden (Renaissance dwelling at n°42). A little further on, the musée de l'Échevinage de Saintes (15th century) is the former seat of municipal administration. It now houses a museum of fine arts. A little further away, the heritage interpretation center combines ancient elements and modernist architecture. It adjoins the médiathèque municipale François Mitterrand (former convent des Jacobins) and its old church in flamboyant Gothic style.

Several picturesque streets and alleys are directly connected to rue Alsace-Lorraine: from north to south, these are rue Porte-Aiguière, du Rempart, Mauny, Victor Hugo, (place) de l'Échevinage, du Piège, de la Comédie and Jacobins.

The main axis of the historic center, it is lined with numerous shops of all kinds (delicatessens, artisan shops, restaurants, bars, fast food chains and souvenir shops). A shopping mall (galerie Saint-Pierre) also brings together several brands in various areas.

== Remarkable buildings and places of memory ==
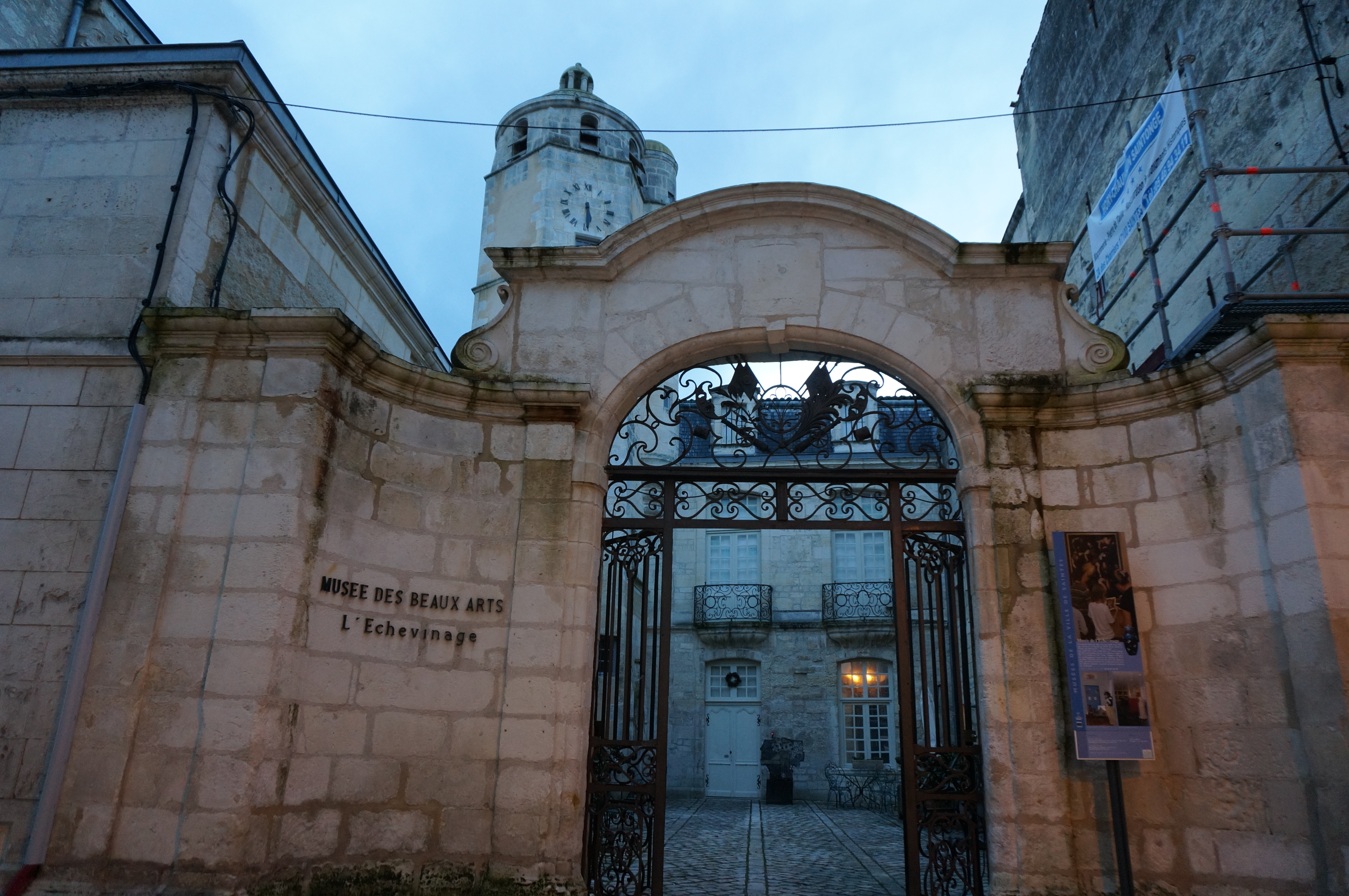
Musée de l'Échevinage de Saintes
