= Louis-Félix Rhénasteine =

Painter from Prince-Bishopric of Liège

Louis-Félix Rhénasteine (1718–1799) was a painter from what is now Belgium. He was born in Malmedy, Prince-Bishopric of Liège, where he also died. He was notable for his religious works and portraits. He is also known as Louy Phélix Rhénasteine in writings of the period.

== Life ==
A son of the painter Nicolas Rhénasteine, he worked for the courts of the Princely Abbey of Stavelot-Malmedy and of the Prince-Bishopric of Liège. He had three sons, who all also became portraitists:

- Nicolas Joseph Rhénasteine or Renasteie (1750–1830)
- Louis Joseph Félix Rhénasteine (1754–1795), painter of the portrait of prince-bishop François-Charles de Velbrück now in the Curtius Museum in Liège *Englebert Rhénasteine (1758–1831).

== Paintings ==
=== Portraits ===
- Portrait of Charles-Nicolas d'Oultremont, prince-bishop of Liège, c.1763 : Liège, Palais provincial.
- Portrait of François-Charles de Velbrück, prince-bishop of Liège, 1782 : Liège, Curtius Museum.
- Portrait of Nicolas Massin, prince-abbot of Stavelot-Malmedy: Malmedy Cathedral
- Portrait of Joseph de Nollet, prince-abbot of Stavelot-Malmedy, 1757 : Malmedy Cathedral
- Portrait of Jacques-Maximilien-Joseph de Rubin, prince-abbot of Stavelot-Malmedy, c. 1770: Malmedy Cathedral
- Portrait Francis I of Lorraine, oil on canvas, 1757 : Treasury of Malmedy Cathedral

=== Religious works ===
- Resurrection of Christ : Bellevaux, église Saint-Aubin.
- Isidore of Seville, c.1730 : Bévercé, chapelle Saint-Antoine Ermite.
- The Dead Christ in a Shroud with the Virgin and St John, 1755 : Malmedy, chapelle Saint-François.
- Resurrection of Christ, c.1755 : Malmedy, chapelle de la Résurrection.
- Holy Family, c. 1745 : Robertville, high altarpiece of the église saint-Joseph.

== Manuscripts and drawings ==
- Arcus triumphalis reverendissimo ... D. Nicolao de Massin ... abbati Stabulen. & Malmundarien., manuscript book of painted emblems, dedicated to Nicolas Massin : Cambridge (Massachusetts), Houghton Library, Harvard University, cote Ms. lat. 419.
- Frontispiece to the psalter for the Benedictine monastery at Malmedy, manuscript, 1745–1755 : Treasury of Malmedy Cathedral.
- Report on the coats of arms of Stavelot Abbey, series of 7 drawings: Liège, Archives de l'État.

== Bibliography ==
- Bolly, Jean-Jacques (1978). Province de Liège Canton de Malmedy (in French). Bruxelles: Institut Royal du Patrimoine Artistique. OCLC 901066151.
- George, Jean Philippe (2005). "Le Trésor de la Cathédrale de Malmedy". Bloc-Notes. Trésor de la cathédrale de Liège (in French). 3 (5): 4–9.
- Maquet, Jean Julien (2005). "Le portrait de Monseigneur de Grady († 1767), une œuvre inédite de Louis-Félix Rhénasteine ?". Chroniques d'archéologie et d'histoire du pays de Liège (in French). 2 (11, juillet-septembre 2005): 114–117.
- (in French) Paul-André de Fossa, « Portrait du « chevalier » Alexandre de Franquinet (1711–1788), par Louis-Félix Rhénasteine », Le Parchemin, vol. 417, mai-juin 2015, p. 245–249.
