= Directoire style =

Arts style of the French Directory (1795–1799)

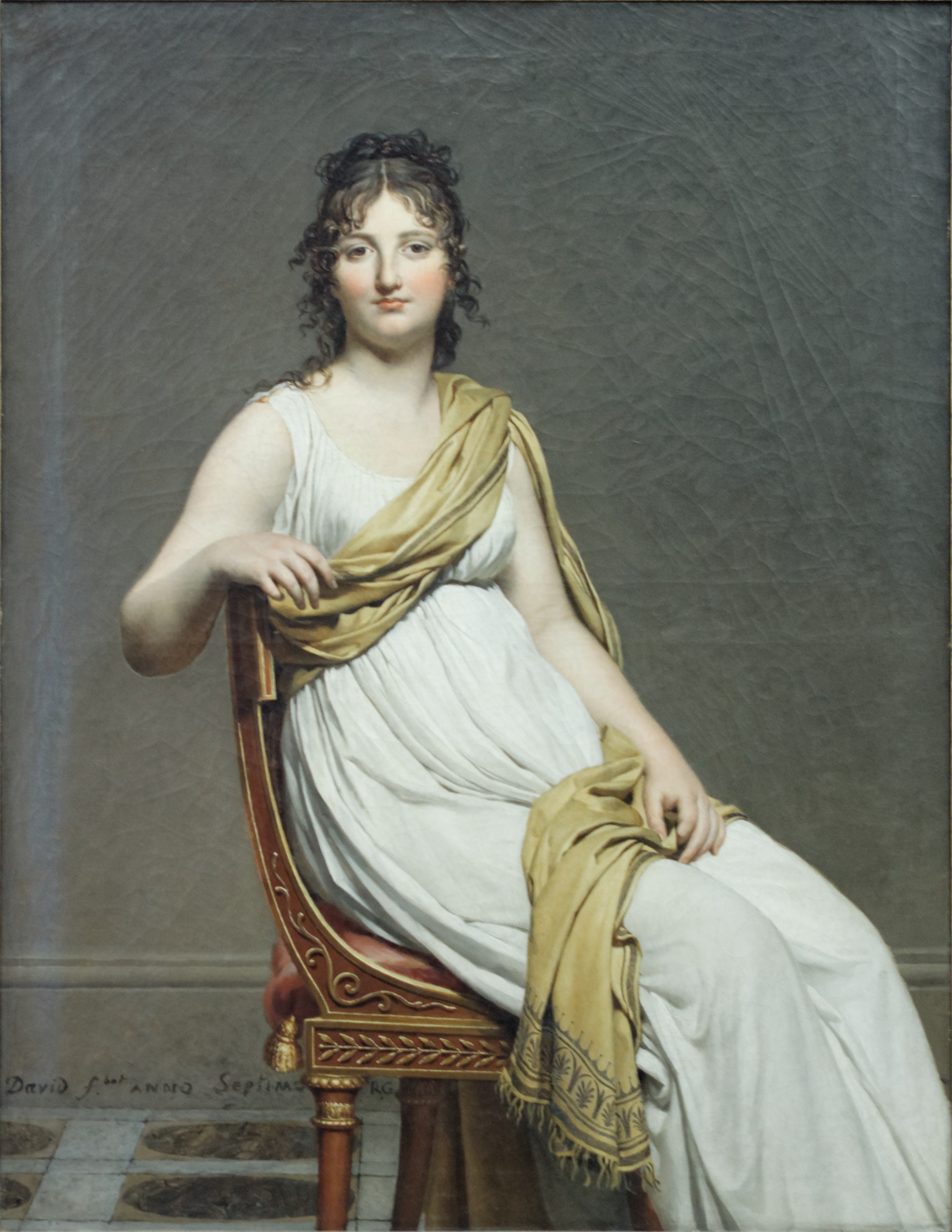
Madame Raymond de Verninac by Jacques-Louis David, with clothes and chair in Directoire style. "Year 7", that is 1798–99.

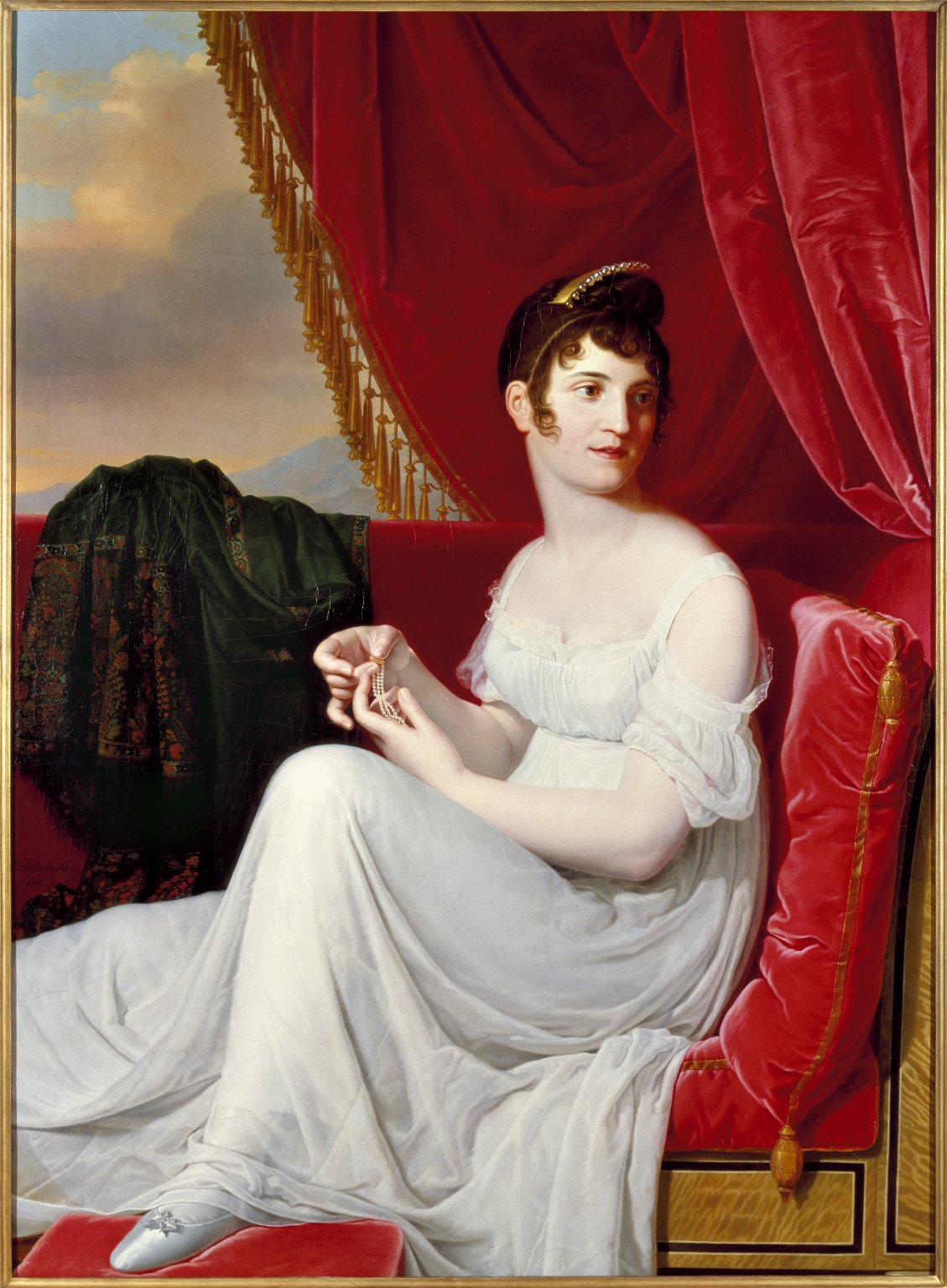
Portrait of Thérésa Tallien by Jean-Bernard Duvivier (1806) at the Brooklyn Museum

Directoire style (French pronunciation: [diʁɛktwaʁ]) was a period in the decorative arts, fashion, and especially furniture design in France concurrent with the Directory (November 2, 1795–November 10, 1799), the later part of the French Revolution. The style uses Neoclassical architectural forms, minimal carving, planar expanses of highly grained veneers, and applied decorative painting. It is a style transitional between Louis XVI and Empire.

The Directoire style was primarily established by the architects and designers Charles Percier (1764–1838) and Pier François Léonard Fontaine (1762–1853). In its use of Neoclassical architectural forms and decorative motifs the style anticipates the slightly later and more elaborate Empire style, which was introduced after Napoleon established the First French Empire.

The Directoire style reflected the Revolutionary belief in the values of republican Rome:

"The stoic virtues of Republican Rome were upheld as standards not merely for the arts but also for political behaviour and private morality. Conventionels saw themselves as antique heroes. Children were named after Brutus, Solon and Lycurgus. The festivals of the Revolution were staged by Jacques-Louis David as antique rituals. Even the chairs in which the committee of Salut Publique sat were made on antique models devised by David.... In fact Neo-classicism became fashionable".

== Furniture ==
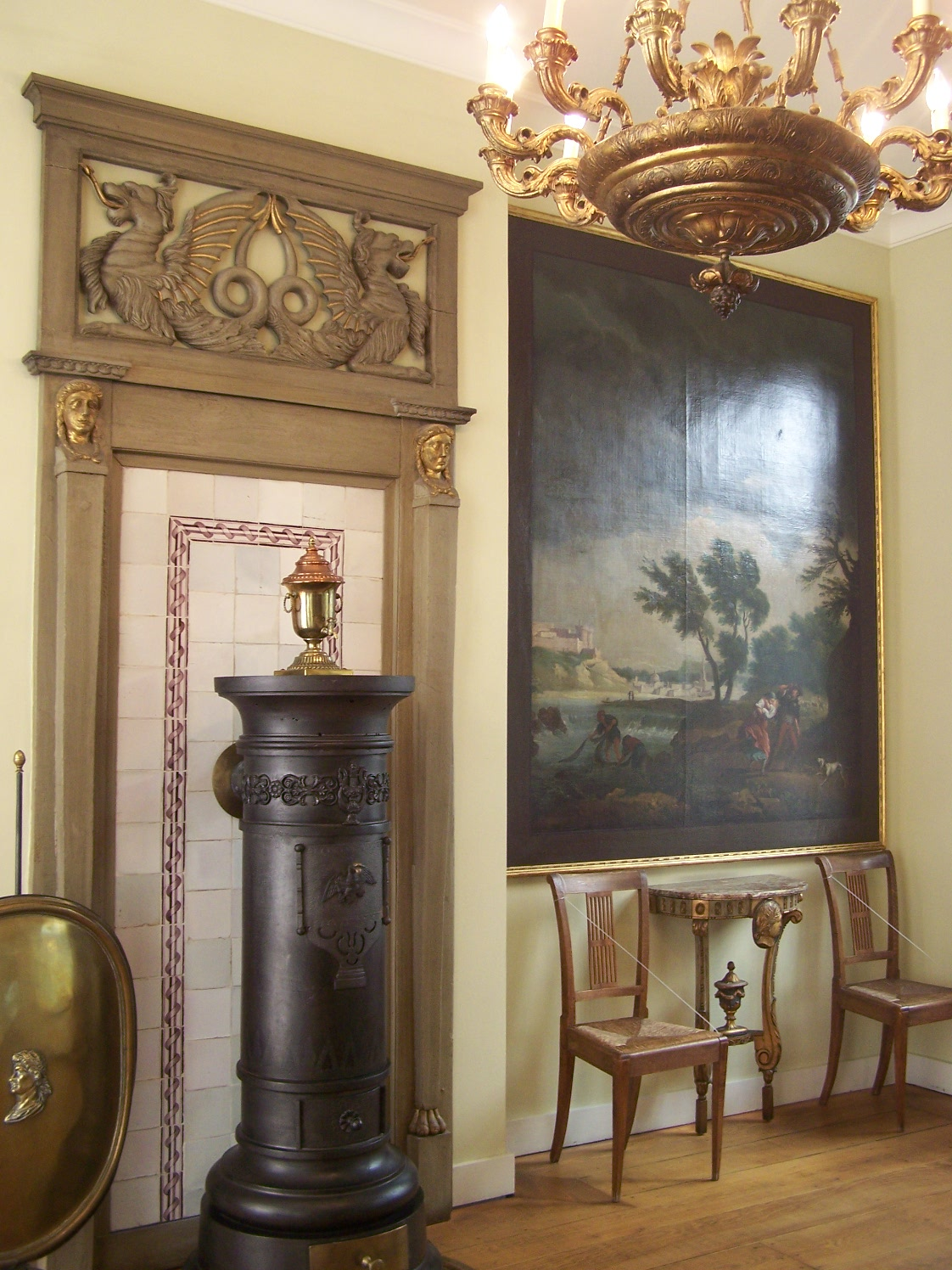
Directoire room at the Couven Museum

The sources of inspiration are Etruscan, Roman and Louis XVI style. The main decorative motifs are: classical vases, carved urns, arrows, winged lions, dragons, mermaids, female busts and sphinxes.

== See also ==
- Jacob-Desmalter
