= Bertholet Flemalle =

Liège Baroque painter (1614-1675)

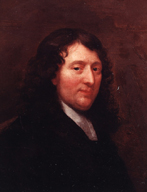
- Self-portrait, 1663
- Born: Bertholet Flémal; 23 May 1614; Liège
- Died: 1675 (aged 60–61); Liège
- Known for: Painting
- Movement: Baroque

Bertholet Flemalle, Flemal, or Flamael (1614–1675) was a Liège Baroque painter.

== Biography ==
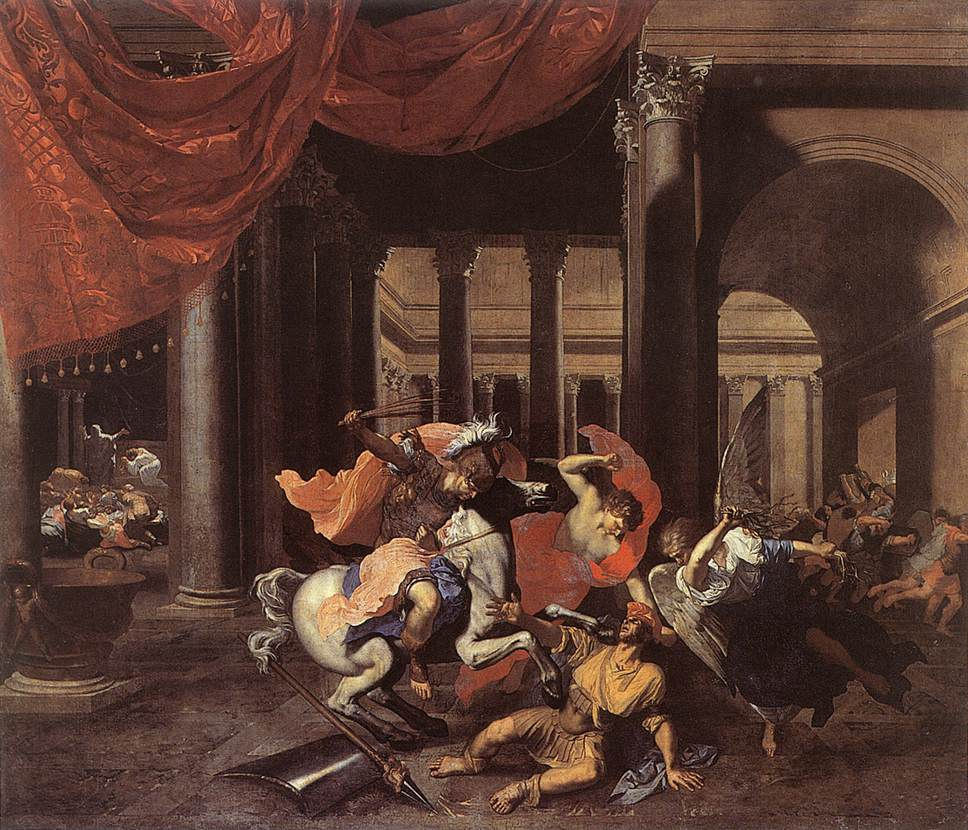
Heliodorus driven from the temple, 1658–62.

The son of a glass painter, he was instructed in his art by Henri Trippet and Gerard Douffet successively. He visited Rome in 1638, and was invited by the Duke of Tuscany to Florence and employed in decorating one of his galleries. Thence he moved to Paris where he carried out some elaborate decorative work at Versailles and painted for the sacristy of the church of the Augustinians his picture of the Adoration of the Magi. He returned to Liège in 1647 and executed many paintings for the churches of his native town. In 1670 he was invited to return to Paris, and painted the ceiling of the audience room in the Tuileries. Louis XIV made him a professor of the Royal Academy of Paris. Towards the close of his life he returned to Liège and was elected a lay canon of the church of St. Paul, and painted several works for the Prince-Bishop of the city. His The Glorification of the Holy Cross is in St Bartholomew's Church, Liège. A few years before he died he reportedly fell into a state of profound melancholy and had to be placed under the care of a medical man, in whose house he died. It has been argued that his colouring is pale and weak and his figures somewhat artificial. He is believed to have painted a portrait of Colbert and by some writers is stated to have been a pupil at one time of Jordaens, but this has never been verified. Gerard de Lairesse was one of his pupils.
