= Collegiate Church of St Bartholomew, Liège =

Roman Catholic church in Liège, Belgium

Coordinates: 50.6479°N 5.5828°E

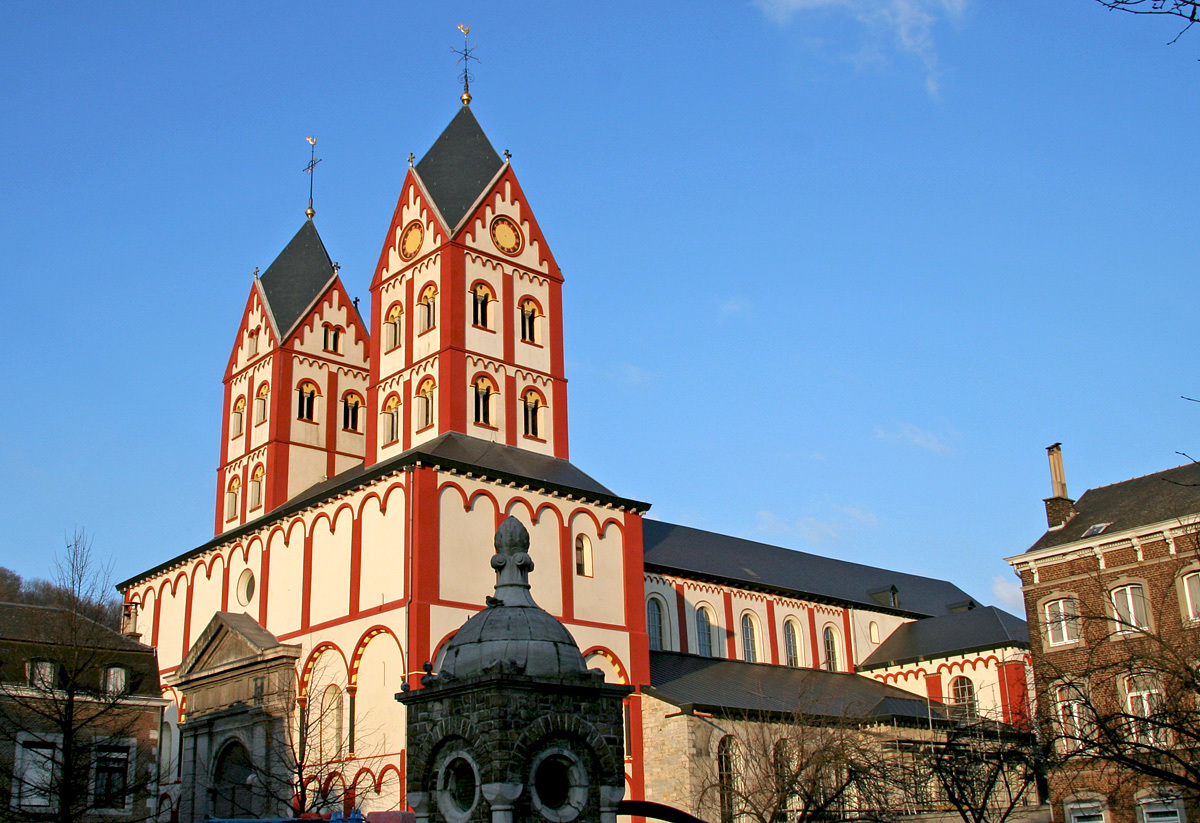
Collegiate Church of St. Bartholomew

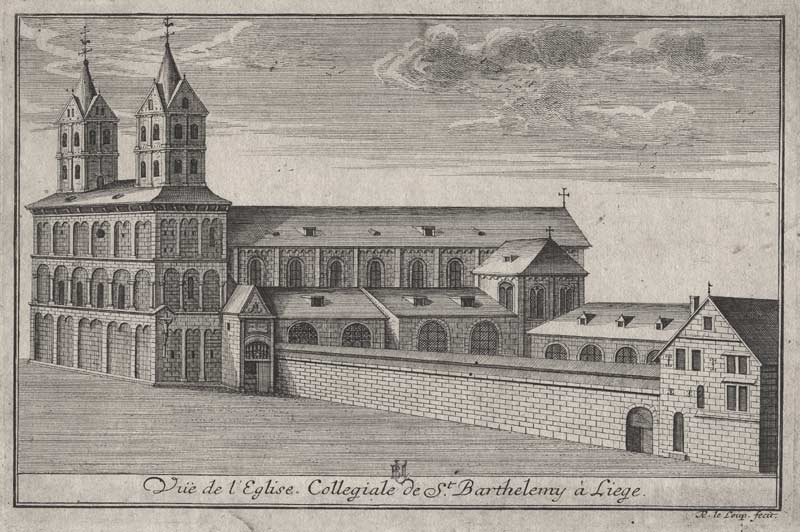
Engraving of the building from 1735

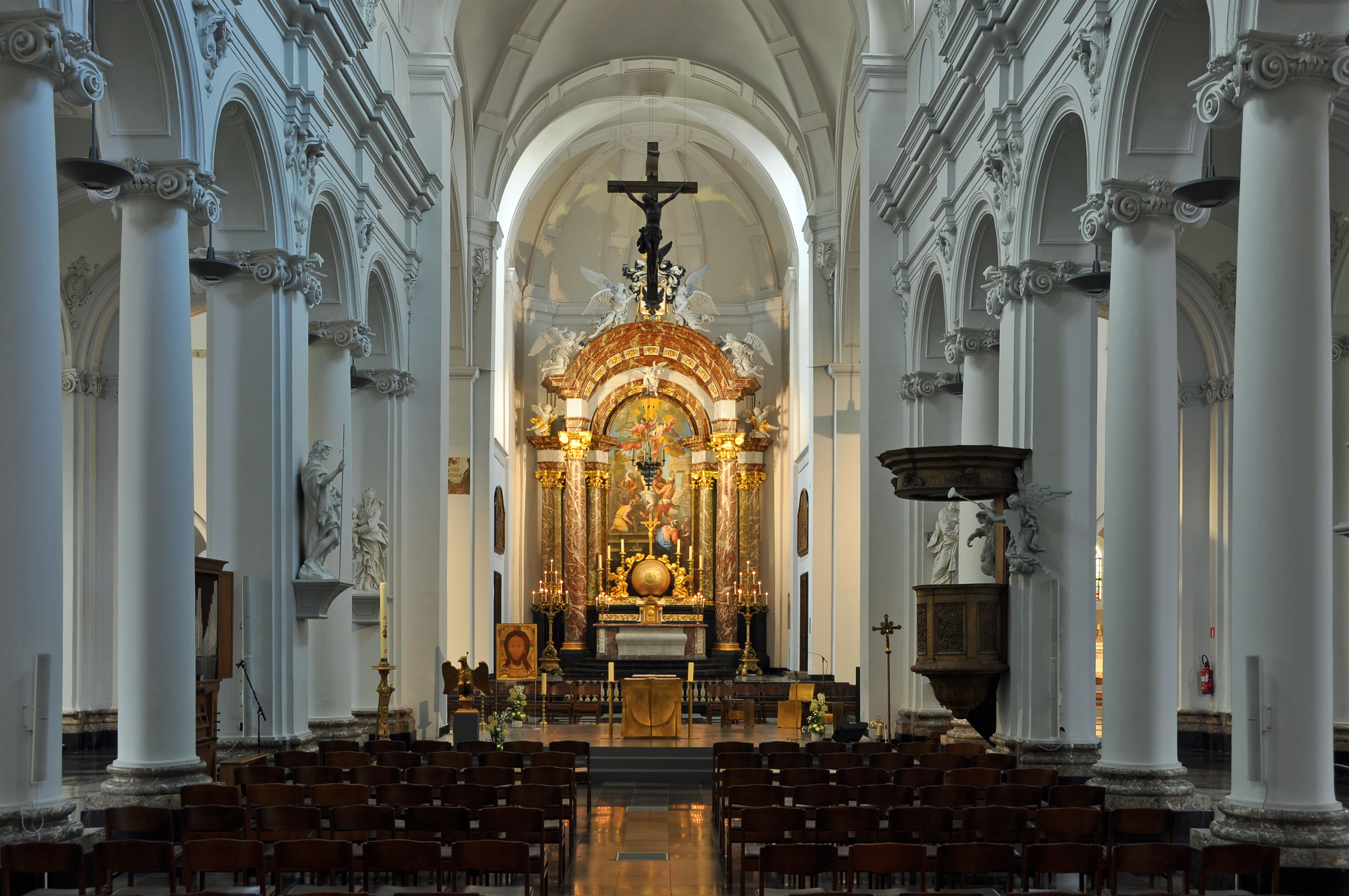
Interior

The Collegiate Church of St. Bartholomew (French: Collégiale Saint-Barthélemy) is a Roman Catholic collegiate church in Liège, Belgium. Founded outside the city walls, it was built in coal sandstone, starting in the late 11th century (the chancel) and lasting until the late 12th century (the massive westwork, with its twin towers which were reconstructed in 1876). It underwent, like most ancient religious buildings, modifications through the centuries. Nevertheless, the Meuse Romanesque—Ottonian architecture character of its architecture remained deeply rooted. The 18th century saw the addition of two more aisles, the opening of a neoclassical portal in the walls of the westwork, and the French Baroque redecoration of the interior. The interior of the western section has recently been restored back to the original style.

The Collegiate Church of St. Bartholomew was one of the original seven collegiate churches of Liège, which also included the Churches of St. Peter, St. Paul, St. John, St. Denis, St. Martin, and the Holy Cross, and until the Liège Revolution of 1789 collectively comprised the "secondary clergy" in the First Estate of the Prince-bishopric of Liège.

In 2006, the church emerged from heavy restoration work lasting seven years and involving 10,000 replaced stones and the restoration of the polychromy of the walls).

== Art collections ==
The church contains numerous works of art, among which may be mentioned The Glorification of the Holy Cross, a tableau of the local painter Bertholet Flemalle (1614–1675); The Crucifixion, from another local artist, Englebert Fisen (1655–1733); and a statue of St. Roch by Renier Panhay de Rendeux.

St. Bartholomew is the site of one of the most known examples of ecclesiastical Mosan art, a baptismal font attributed to the goldsmith Renier de Huy. It was commissioned at the beginning of the 12th century (1107–1108) by the Abbot Hellin for the Church of Notre-Dame-aux-Fonts, now destroyed, where local baptisms traditionally were administered.

The font was installed in St. Bartholomew Church in 1804, after having been spared from the occupying forces of the French Revolutionary Army.

This work heralds a resurgence of Greek influences on Western art. The brass tank, resting on ten (originally twelve) ox figures, presents five scenes: the Baptism of Jesus in the Jordan, the preaching of St. John the Baptist, the baptism of the catechumens, the baptism of the Centurion Cornelius, and the baptism of the philosopher Craton.

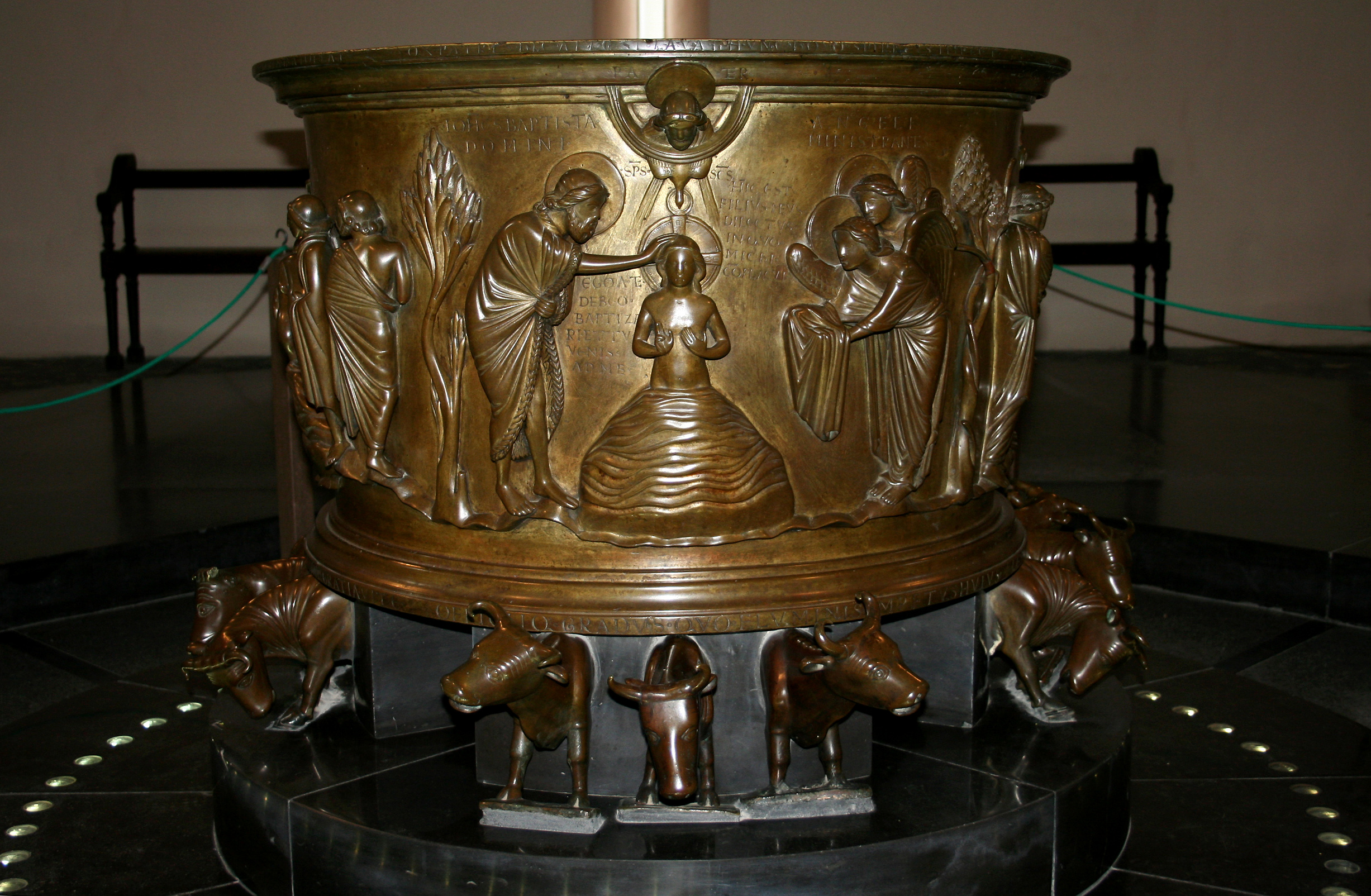
Font of Renier de Huy: The baptism of Christ

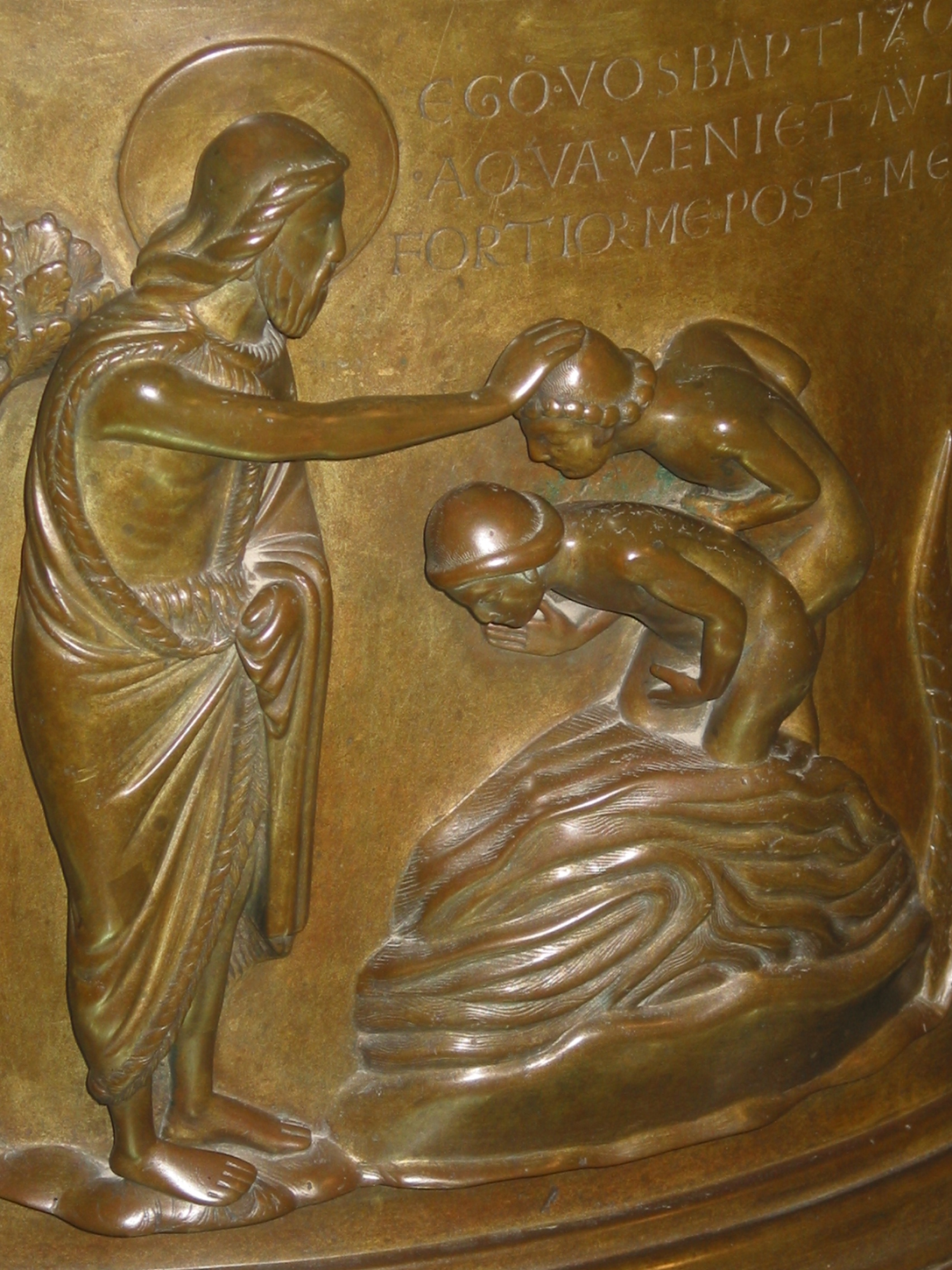
Font of Renier de Huy: The baptism of the catechumens

== Notable figures ==
- Alger of Liège (1055–1131), deacon
