= Curtius Museum =

Museum of archaeology and decorative arts in Liège, Belgium

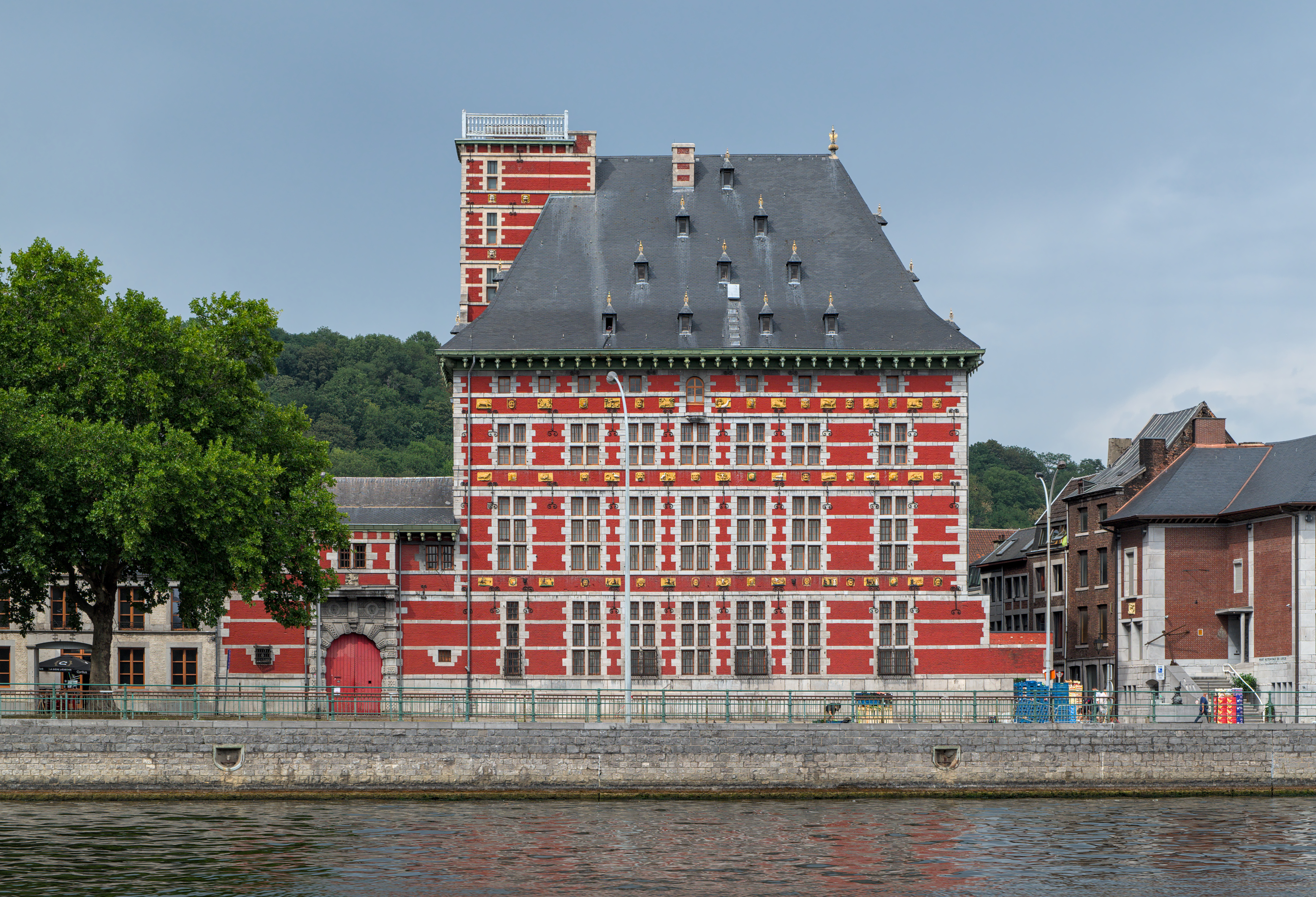
Curtius Museum

The Curtius Museum (French: Musée Curtius) is a museum of archaeology and decorative arts located on the bank of the river Meuse in Liège, Belgium. It is classified as a Major Heritage of Wallonia.

It was built sometime between 1597 and 1610 as a private mansion for Jean Curtius, industrialist and munitions supplier to the Spanish army. With its alternating layers of red brick and natural stone and its cross-mullioned windows, it typifies the regional style known as Mosan Renaissance architecture.

After a €50 million redevelopment, the museum reopened as the Grand Curtius (Le Grand Curtius) in March 2009, SND now houses the merged collections of four former museums: the Museum of Archeology, the Museum of Weaponry, the Museum of Decorative Arts, and the Arteum of Religious Art and Mosan art. Its highlights include treasures of Mosan art such as a 12th-century gilded reliquary triptych, formerly in the church of Sainte-Croix;the Evangelarium of Notger; sculptures by Jean Del Cour; and a portrait of Napoleon Bonaparte painted by Ingres in 1804: Bonaparte, First Consul.

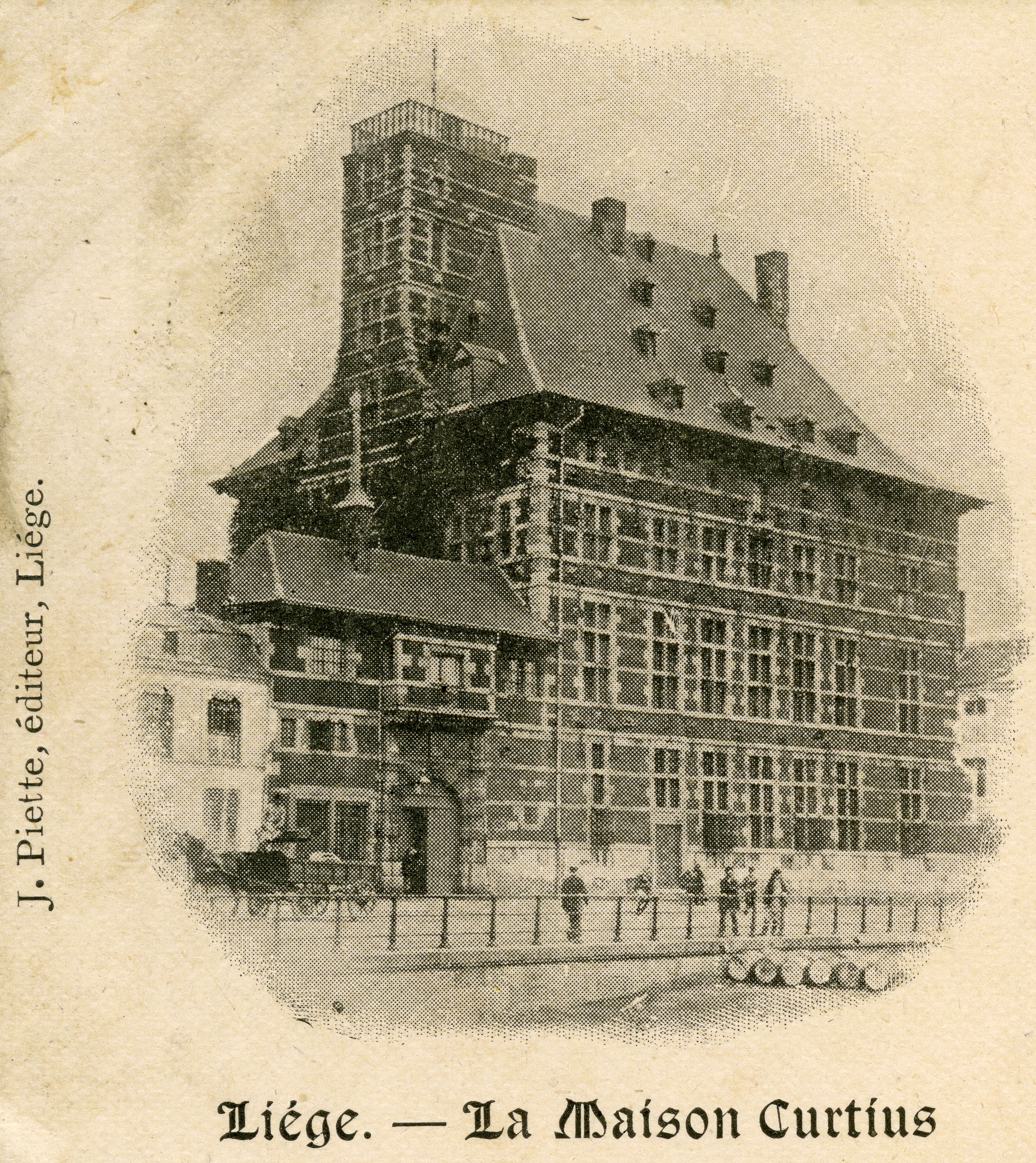
Image from an 1898 postcard.

== See also ==
- Liège–Aachen Baroque furniture
- Baroque in Prince-Bishopric of Liège
- Ansembourg Museum in Liège, Belgium
- Couven Museum in Aachen, Germany
- Museum aan het Vrijthof in Maastricht, Netherlands
- Koninklijke Musea voor Kunst en Geschiedenis (KMKG) in Brussels, Belgium
