= List of Catholic churches in Belgium =

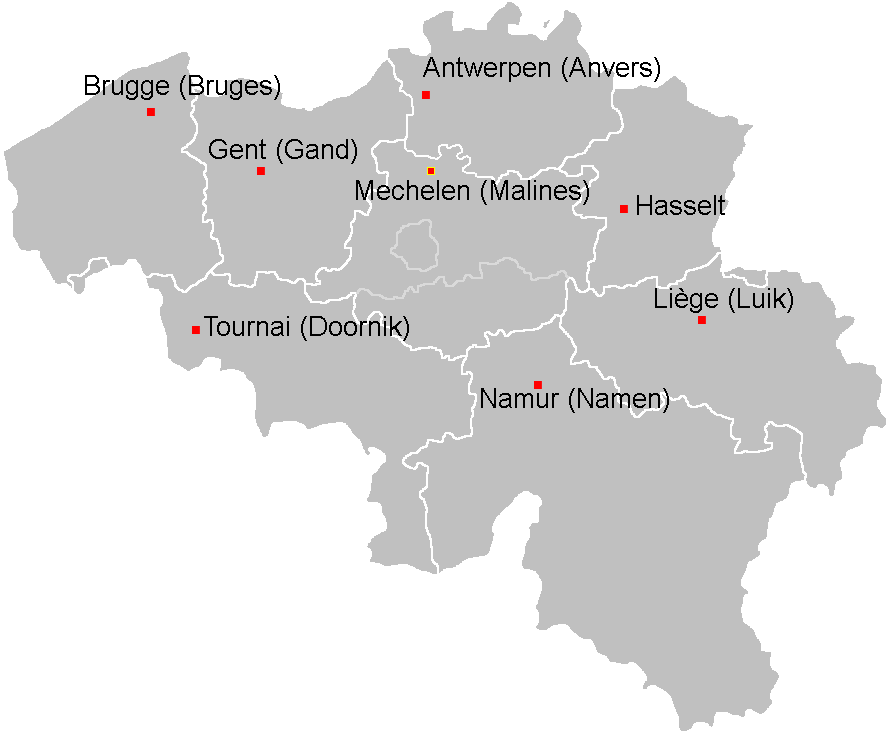
Map of Belgian dioceses

This is a list of Catholic churches in Belgium.

== Cathedrals ==
See: List of Catholic cathedrals in Belgium

- Cathedral of Our Lady (Antwerp)
- St. Salvator's Cathedral, Bruges
- Cathedral of St. Michael and St. Gudula, Brussels
- St Bavo's Cathedral, Ghent
- St. Quentin Cathedral, Hasselt
- Liège Cathedral
- St. Rumbold's Cathedral, Mechelen
- St Aubin's Cathedral, Namur
- Tournai Cathedral

Former

- St. Donatian's Cathedral, Bruges
- St. Lambert's Cathedral, Liège
- St Martin's Cathedral, Ypres

== Basilicas ==
- Basilica of Our Lady of Hanswijk, Mechelen, Antwerp
- Basilica of Our Lady of Scherpenheuvel, Scherpenheuvel-Zichem, Flemish Brabant
- Basilica of Our Lady of Tongre, Chièvres, Hainaut
- Basilica of the Holy Blood, Bruges, West Flanders
- Basilica of the Sacred Heart, Brussels
- Abbey Basilica of St Andrew, Zevenkerken, West Flanders
- Basilica of Saint Maternus, Walcourt, Namur
- Onze-Lieve-Vrouw ten Troost, Vilvoorde, Flemish Brabant
- Oostakker Basilica, East Flanders
- Virga Jesse Basilica, Hasselt, Limburg

== Chapels ==
- Chapel of the Resurrection, Brussels
- Chapel of Saint Brigid, Fosses-la-Ville, Namur

== Churches ==
=== Antwerp ===
In the Diocese of Antwerp:

- Recollects Convent, Antwerp
- St. Charles Borromeo Church, Antwerp
- St. Andrew's Church, Antwerp
- St. James' Church, Antwerp
- St. Paul's Church, Antwerp
- St. Walburga Church, Antwerp

In the Archdiocese of Mechelen-Brussels:

- Church of Our Lady of Leliendaal, Mechelen

=== Brussels ===
In the Archdiocese of Mechelen-Brussels:

- Collegiate Church of St. Peter and St. Guido
- Convent Van Maerlant
- Church of Our Lady of Finisterrae
- Church of Our Lady of Laeken
- Church of Our Lady of the Chapel
- Church of Our Lady of Victories at the Sablon
- Church of St. Augustine
- Church of St. Catherine
- Church of St. Clement
- Church of St. James on Coudenberg
- Church of St. John Berchmans
- Church of St. John the Baptist
- Church of St. John the Baptist at the Béguinage
- Church of St. Joseph
- Church of St. Nicholas
- Saint Mary's Royal Church
- Temple of the Augustinians

=== East Flanders ===
In the Diocese of Ghent:

- Church of St Anthony of Padua, Ghent
- Drongen Abbey
- Saint Laurentius Church
- Saint Michael's Church, Ghent
- Saint Nicholas' Church, Ghent
- St. Stefanus, Ghent
- Holy Cross Church, Heusden
- Church of Our Lady, Melsele
- Church of Our Lady (Temse)

=== Flemish Brabant ===
In the Archdiocese of Mechelen-Brussels:

- Sint-Anna Church (Itterbeek)
- St. Peter's Church, Leuven
- Saint Quentin's Church
- St. Leonard's Church, Zoutleeuw

=== Hainaut ===
In the Diocese of Tournai:

- Collegiate Church of Saint Ursmer
- Church of Saint Quentin, Tournai
- Church of Saint-Sulpice, Jumet

=== Liège ===
In the Diocese of Liege:

- Seven collegiate churches of Liège
- St Bartholomew's Church, Liège
- Church of St. Denis (Liège)
- St James's Church, Liège
- Church of Saint John the Evangelist, Liège
- St Peter's Church, Liège
- Holy Cross Church, Liège

=== Limburg ===
In the Diocese of Hasselt:

- Church of Saint Anne, Aldeneik
- Sint-Laurenskerk, Bocholt
- St. Peter in Chains Church (Beringen)

=== Luxembourg ===
In the Diocese of Namur:

- St. Peter's Church, Melreux

=== Walloon Brabant ===
In the Archdiocese of Mechelen-Brussels:

- Collegiate Church of Saint Gertrude, Nivelles
- Church of Saint Joseph, Waterloo

=== West Flanders ===
In the Diocese of Bruges:

- Church of Our Lady, Bruges
- St. James's Church, Bruges
- St. Walburga Church (Bruges)
- Church of Our Lady (Kortrijk)
- Saint Martin's Church (Kortrijk)
- Sint-Petrus-en-Pauluskerk
- St. Vedast Church, Vlamertinge

== See also ==
- Catholic Church in Belgium
- List of Christian monasteries in Belgium
- Knights of Saint Thomas More
