= List of protected heritage sites in Bocholt, Belgium =

This table shows an overview of the protected heritage sites in the Flemish town Bocholt, Belgium. This list is part of Belgium's national heritage.

Object	Status^{?}	Year/architect	Town/section	Address	Coordinates	Number^{?}	Image
Lockkeeper house and office ^{(nl)} ^{(fr)}			Bocholt	Achelsedijk 3	51.18855°N 5.56385°E	70685 Info	
village houses ^{(nl)} ^{(fr)}			Bocholt	Breeerweg 9	51.16978°N 5.58248°E	70686 Info	
village houses ^{(nl)} ^{(fr)}			Bocholt	Breeerweg 11	51.16978°N 5.58248°E	70686 Info	
Burger House ^{(nl)} ^{(fr)}			Bocholt	Breeerweg 19	51.16867°N 5.58378°E	70687 Info	
elongated farm ^{(nl)} ^{(fr)}			Bocholt	Breeerweg 20	51.16916°N 5.58223°E	70688 Info	
Burger House ^{(nl)} ^{(fr)}			Bocholt	Breeerweg 34	51.16815°N 5.58344°E	70689 Info	
section several boys school (former) ^{(nl)} ^{(fr)}			Bocholt	Dorpsstraat 2	51.17435°N 5.58072°E	70690 Info	
house of lost farm ^{(nl)} ^{(fr)}			Bocholt	Dorpsstraat 30	51.17196°N 5.57928°E	70691 Info	
Burger House ^{(nl)} ^{(fr)}			Bocholt	Dorpsstraat 46	51.17086°N 5.58043°E	70692 Info	
Elongated building in eclectic style ^{(nl)} ^{(fr)}			Bocholt	Dorpsstraat 49	51.17217°N 5.57979°E	70693 Info	
Elongated building in eclectic style ^{(nl)} ^{(fr)}			Bocholt	Dorpsstraat 51	51.17217°N 5.57979°E	70693 Info	
Martens Brewery Museum ^{(nl)} ^{(fr)}			Bocholt	Dorpsstraat 53	51.17212°N 5.58049°E	70694 Info	
Damburg ^{(nl)} ^{(fr)}	Yes		Bocholt	Eikenlaan 1	51.16823°N 5.56851°E	70695 Info	
Bipartisan farm ^{(nl)} ^{(fr)}			Bocholt	Eilandweg 1	51.17085°N 5.59348°E	70696 Info	
Old dairy "The Star" ^{(nl)} ^{(fr)}			Bocholt	Hamonterweg 37	51.18998°N 5.57293°E	70697 Info	
village house ^{(nl)} ^{(fr)}			Bocholt	Hamonterweg 67	51.19290°N 5.56989°E	70698 Info	
elongated farm ^{(nl)} ^{(fr)}			Bocholt	Hamonterweg 82	51.19501°N 5.56858°E	70699 Info	
St. Jobkapel ^{(nl)} ^{(fr)}			Bocholt	Heuvelstraat	51.17644°N 5.58179°E	70700 Info	
two houses ^{(nl)} ^{(fr)}			Bocholt	Heuvelstraat 9	51.17603°N 5.58155°E	70701 Info	
two houses ^{(nl)} ^{(fr)}			Bocholt	Heuvelstraat 11	51.17603°N 5.58155°E	70701 Info	
Elongated building ^{(nl)} ^{(fr)}			Bocholt	Heuvelstraat 41	51.17639°N 5.58182°E	70702 Info	
village house ^{(nl)} ^{(fr)}			Bocholt	Heuvelstraat 59	51.17738°N 5.58300°E	70703 Info	
Chapel of St. Therese of Lisieux ^{(nl)} ^{(fr)}			Bocholt	Hoekstraat	51.18858°N 5.58891°E	70704 Info	"
Nouwenhof elongated farm ^{(nl)} ^{(fr)}			Bocholt	Hoekstraat 5	51.18477°N 5.58651°E	70705 Info	"
Groulshof Kempen-style elongated farm ^{(nl)} ^{(fr)}			Bocholt	Hoekstraat 17	51.18832°N 5.58864°E	70706 Info	
elongated farm ^{(nl)} ^{(fr)}			Bocholt	Hoogstraat 4	51.17761°N 5.58244°E	70707 Info	
Farmstead "Kaekebeek" ^{(nl)} ^{(fr)}			Bocholt	Kakebeekstraat 14	51.18985°N 5.62191°E	70709 Info	
Chapel of Veldhoven ^{(nl)} ^{(fr)}			Bocholt	Kapelstraat 72	51.18457°N 5.57284°E	70710 Info	
Farmhouse with separate components ^{(nl)} ^{(fr)}			Bocholt	Kapelstraat 67	51.18410°N 5.57243°E	70711 Info	
Convent of the Sisters of Providence School (former) ^{(nl)} ^{(fr)}			Bocholt	Kloosterstraat 1	51.17413°N 5.58252°E	70713 Info	
elongated farm ^{(nl)} ^{(fr)}			Bocholt	Kreyelerstraat 24	51.17961°N 5.60413°E	70714 Info	
Farmhouse with separate components ^{(nl)} ^{(fr)}			Bocholt	Kreyelerstraat 34	51.17610°N 5.60390°E	70715 Info	
Farmhouse with separate components ^{(nl)} ^{(fr)}			Bocholt	Krokusstraat 12	51.18352°N 5.55879°E	70716 Info	
Burger House ^{(nl)} ^{(fr)}			Bocholt	Hamonterweg 133	51.19879°N 5.56382°E	70717 Info	
village house ^{(nl)} ^{(fr)}			Bocholt	Hamonterweg 134	51.20242°N 5.56110°E	70718 Info	
school section (former) ^{(nl)} ^{(fr)}	Yes		Bocholt	Hamonterweg 136	51.20282°N 5.56083°E	70719 Info	
Presbytery of Lozen ^{(nl)} ^{(fr)}	Yes		Bocholt	Hamonterweg 138	51.20302°N 5.56056°E	70720 Info	
Girl School (former) ^{(nl)} ^{(fr)}			Bocholt	Hamonterweg 183	51.20291°N 5.56115°E	70721 Info	
Two contiguous houses ^{(nl)} ^{(fr)}			Bocholt	Kempenstraat 5	51.20705°N 5.55741°E	70722 Info	
Two contiguous houses ^{(nl)} ^{(fr)}			Bocholt	Kempenstraat 6	51.20705°N 5.55741°E	70722 Info	
Flat, wide house ^{(nl)} ^{(fr)}			Bocholt	Kempenstraat 8	51.20756°N 5.55809°E	70723 Info	
two houses ^{(nl)} ^{(fr)}			Bocholt	Kempenstraat 11	51.20798°N 5.55917°E	70724 Info	
two houses ^{(nl)} ^{(fr)}			Bocholt	Kempenstraat 12	51.20798°N 5.55917°E	70724 Info	
Flat, wide house ^{(nl)} ^{(fr)}			Bocholt	Kempenstraat 18	51.20850°N 5.56123°E	70725 Info	
Parish Church St Benedict ^{(nl)} ^{(fr)}	Yes		Bocholt	Lozerplein	51.20339°N 5.56054°E	70726 Info	
lock Building ^{(nl)} ^{(fr)}			Bocholt	Lozerstraat 6	51.20733°N 5.55563°E	70727 Info	
farm ^{(nl)} ^{(fr)}			Bocholt	Lozerstraat 1	51.20719°N 5.55423°E	70728 Info	
Flat, wide house ^{(nl)} ^{(fr)}			Bocholt	Lozerstraat 7	51.20772°N 5.55615°E	70729 Info	
elongated farm ^{(nl)} ^{(fr)}			Bocholt	Rondestraat 7	51.20107°N 5.55972°E	70730 Info	
Front Luysmolen ^{(nl)} ^{(fr)}	Yes		Bocholt	Luysenweg 2	51.17967°N 5.63098°E	70731 Info	
Tielkenshof ^{(nl)} ^{(fr)}			Bocholt	Meierbroekstraat 1	51.16582°N 5.58542°E	70732 Info	
Brouwerij Martens ^{(nl)} ^{(fr)}			Bocholt	Reppelerweg 1	51.17171°N 5.57883°E	70733 Info	
elongated farm ^{(nl)} ^{(fr)}			Bocholt	Reppelerweg 31	51.16729°N 5.57536°E	70734 Info	
village house ^{(nl)} ^{(fr)}			Bocholt	Reppelerweg 29	51.16768°N 5.57571°E	70735 Info	
elongated farm ^{(nl)} ^{(fr)}			Bocholt	Schoolstraat 29	51.17562°N 5.57846°E	70737 Info	
Farmhouse with separate components ^{(nl)} ^{(fr)}			Bocholt	Stramproyerweg 44	51.18353°N 5.60564°E	70738 Info	
elongated farm ^{(nl)} ^{(fr)}			Bocholt	Veldhovenstraat 13	51.18866°N 5.57952°E	70739 Info	
Lower Mill or "cloot Mill" ^{(nl)} ^{(fr)}	Yes		Bocholt	Watermolenweg 1	51.17843°N 5.61379°E	70743 Info	
Roekeshof, former elongated farm ^{(nl)} ^{(fr)}			Bocholt	Weerterweg 52	51.18325°N 5.59454°E	70744 Info	
Farm, "Schummershof" ^{(nl)} ^{(fr)}			Bocholt	Weerterweg 141	51.19671°N 5.62374°E	70745 Info	
former section school ^{(nl)} ^{(fr)}			Bocholt	Bosschelweg 18	51.18849°N 5.51592°E	70746 Info	
director's house ^{(nl)} ^{(fr)}			Bocholt	Fabriekstraat 108	51.20023°N 5.53700°E	70747 Info	
director's house ^{(nl)} ^{(fr)}			Bocholt	Fabriekstraat 110	51.20023°N 5.53700°E	70747 Info	
former director's house ^{(nl)} ^{(fr)}			Bocholt	Fabriekstraat 112	51.20031°N 5.53754°E	70748 Info	
Offices of P.R.B. (former) ^{(nl)} ^{(fr)}			Bocholt	Fabriekstraat 151	51.20023°N 5.53459°E	70749 Info	
road chapel ^{(nl)} ^{(fr)}			Bocholt	Janshoek	51.18468°N 5.53186°E	70750 Info	
"Dijkshoeve" ^{(nl)} ^{(fr)}			Bocholt	Janshoek 1	51.18488°N 5.53107°E	70751 Info	
Parish of St. Monulphus and Gondulfus ^{(nl)} ^{(fr)}	Yes		Bocholt	Kaulillerdorp 44	51.18803°N 5.51808°E	70752 Info	More images
farmstead "Keizershof" (former) ^{(nl)} ^{(fr)}			Bocholt	Kaulillerdorp 24	51.18951°N 5.51644°E	70753 Info	
village house ^{(nl)} ^{(fr)}			Bocholt	Kaulillerdorp 38	51.18866°N 5.51753°E	70754 Info	
rectory ^{(nl)} ^{(fr)}	Yes		Bocholt	Kaulillerdorp 42	51.18804°N 5.51745°E	70755 Info	
Two village houses ^{(nl)} ^{(fr)}			Bocholt	Molenstraat 2	51.18878°N 5.51711°E	70756 Info	
Two village houses ^{(nl)} ^{(fr)}			Bocholt	Molenstraat 4	51.18878°N 5.51711°E	70756 Info	
Windmill and miller's house ^{(nl)} ^{(fr)}	Yes		Bocholt	Molenstraat 18	51.18787°N 5.51383°E	70757 Info	
elongated farm ^{(nl)} ^{(fr)}			Bocholt	Molenstraat 21	51.18675°N 5.51391°E	70758 Info	
gunpowder Mill ^{(nl)} ^{(fr)}			Bocholt	Nevenplein	51.18990°N 5.51806°E	70759 Info	
Farmhouse with separate components ^{(nl)} ^{(fr)}			Bocholt	Rietweg 33	51.18091°N 5.52365°E	70760 Info	
"Palmanswijk" ^{(nl)} ^{(fr)}			Bocholt	Steenweg op Kleine Brogel 36	51.19178°N 5.51216°E	70761 Info	
"Palmanswijk" ^{(nl)} ^{(fr)}			Bocholt	Steenweg op Kleine Brogel 38	51.19178°N 5.51216°E	70761 Info	
"Palmanswijk" ^{(nl)} ^{(fr)}			Bocholt	Steenweg op Kleine Brogel 40	51.19178°N 5.51216°E	70761 Info	
"Palmanswijk" ^{(nl)} ^{(fr)}			Bocholt	Steenweg op Kleine Brogel 42	51.19178°N 5.51216°E	70761 Info	
"Palmanswijk" ^{(nl)} ^{(fr)}			Bocholt	Steenweg op Kleine Brogel 44	51.19178°N 5.51216°E	70761 Info	
"Palmanswijk" ^{(nl)} ^{(fr)}			Bocholt	Steenweg op Kleine Brogel 46	51.19178°N 5.51216°E	70761 Info	
"Palmanswijk" ^{(nl)} ^{(fr)}			Bocholt	Steenweg op Kleine Brogel 48	51.19178°N 5.51216°E	70761 Info	
"Palmanswijk" ^{(nl)} ^{(fr)}			Bocholt	Steenweg op Kleine Brogel 50	51.19178°N 5.51216°E	70761 Info	
"Palmanswijk" ^{(nl)} ^{(fr)}			Bocholt	Steenweg op Kleine Brogel 52	51.19178°N 5.51216°E	70761 Info	
"Palmanswijk" ^{(nl)} ^{(fr)}			Bocholt	Steenweg op Kleine Brogel 54	51.19178°N 5.51216°E	70761 Info	
"Palmanswijk" ^{(nl)} ^{(fr)}			Bocholt	Steenweg op Kleine Brogel 56	51.19178°N 5.51216°E	70761 Info	
"Palmanswijk" ^{(nl)} ^{(fr)}			Bocholt	Steenweg op Kleine Brogel 58	51.19178°N 5.51216°E	70761 Info	
"Palmanswijk" ^{(nl)} ^{(fr)}			Bocholt	Steenweg op Kleine Brogel 60	51.19178°N 5.51216°E	70761 Info	
"Palmanswijk" ^{(nl)} ^{(fr)}			Bocholt	Steenweg op Kleine Brogel 62	51.19178°N 5.51216°E	70761 Info	
"Palmanswijk" ^{(nl)} ^{(fr)}			Bocholt	Steenweg op Kleine Brogel 64	51.19178°N 5.51216°E	70761 Info	
"Palmanswijk" ^{(nl)} ^{(fr)}			Bocholt	Steenweg op Kleine Brogel 66	51.19178°N 5.51216°E	70761 Info	
"Palmanswijk" ^{(nl)} ^{(fr)}			Bocholt	Steenweg op Kleine Brogel 68	51.19178°N 5.51216°E	70761 Info	
L-shaped farmhouse ^{(nl)} ^{(fr)}			Bocholt	Winterdijkweg 67	51.18824°N 5.50416°E	70762 Info	
section school ^{(nl)} ^{(fr)}			Bocholt	Bergerheidestraat 4	51.15534°N 5.56092°E	70763 Info	
Watermill, "Bink Mill" ^{(nl)} ^{(fr)}	Yes		Bocholt	Binkermolenstraat 1	51.15469°N 5.57186°E	70764 Info	
Farmhouse with separate components (former) ^{(nl)} ^{(fr)}			Bocholt	Galgenbergstraat 22	51.15946°N 5.56293°E	70765 Info	
elongated farm ^{(nl)} ^{(fr)}			Bocholt	Galgenbergstraat 31	51.16158°N 5.56258°E	70766 Info	
Chapel of Our Lady of Middelares ^{(nl)} ^{(fr)}			Bocholt	Grote Baan	51.13828°N 5.55722°E	70767 Info	
Farmstead "Wilbershof" ^{(nl)} ^{(fr)}			Bocholt	Leukenstraat 2	51.16051°N 5.56043°E	70768 Info	
Mill Reppel ^{(nl)} ^{(fr)}	Yes		Bocholt	Monshofstraat 9	51.15378°N 5.55819°E	70770 Info	
rectory ^{(nl)} ^{(fr)}			Bocholt	Monshofstraat 11	51.15375°N 5.55538°E	70771 Info	
elongated farm of 1850 ^{(nl)} ^{(fr)}			Bocholt	Monshofstraat 22	51.15402°N 5.55692°E	70772 Info	
elongated farm ^{(nl)} ^{(fr)}			Bocholt	Monshofstraat 30	51.15423°N 5.55317°E	70773 Info	
Farm "Mons" or "Monshof" ^{(nl)} ^{(fr)}			Bocholt	Monshofstraat 32	51.15275°N 5.54692°E	70774 Info	
St. Willibrord Parish ^{(nl)} ^{(fr)}	Yes		Bocholt	Bergerheidestraat 2	51.15481°N 5.56150°E	70775 Info	
Farmstead "Windmill" ^{(nl)} ^{(fr)}			Bocholt	Reppelerweg 146	51.15234°N 5.56195°E	70776 Info	
elongated farm ^{(nl)} ^{(fr)}			Bocholt	Rozenstraat 8	51.14300°N 5.54449°E	70777 Info	
Building next to the Biotechnicum school ^{(nl)} ^{(fr)}			Bocholt	Kaulillerweg 5	51.17382°N 5.57653°E	86024 Info	
Parish Church St. Lawrence ^{(nl)} ^{(fr)}	Yes		Bocholt	Kerkplein	51.17251°N 5.57901°E	86025 Info	
Smeetshof farmhouse with separate components ^{(nl)} ^{(fr)}			Bocholt	Smeetshofweg 1	51.19898°N 5.63268°E	86026 Info	
section school Kaulille (former) ^{(nl)} ^{(fr)}			Bocholt	Kaulillerweg 51	51.17488°N 5.56760°E	86027 Info	
elongated farm ^{(nl)} ^{(fr)}			Bocholt	Kaulillerweg 167	51.18071°N 5.53681°E	86028 Info	
Our Lady Chapel ^{(nl)} ^{(fr)}			Bocholt	Monshofstraat	51.15423°N 5.55925°E	86029 Info	
Our Lady of Lourdes Chapel ^{(nl)} ^{(fr)}			Bocholt	Monshofstraat	51.15405°N 5.55378°E	86030 Info	
road chapel ^{(nl)} ^{(fr)}			Bocholt	Reppelerweg	51.15762°N 5.56755°E	86031 Info	
chapel ^{(nl)} ^{(fr)}			Bocholt	Rozenstraat	51.14362°N 5.54357°E	86032 Info	
cast iron signpost ^{(nl)} ^{(fr)}			Bocholt	Stramproyerweg	51.18335°N 5.62188°E	88642 Info	
cast Iron cross ^{(nl)} ^{(fr)}			Bocholt	Bergstraat	51.14992°N 5.56421°E	88643 Info	

== See also ==
- List of onroerend erfgoed in Limburg (Belgium)
- Bocholt, Belgium
