= Onze-Lieve-Vrouw ten Troost =

Coordinates: 50.9277°N 4.4294°E

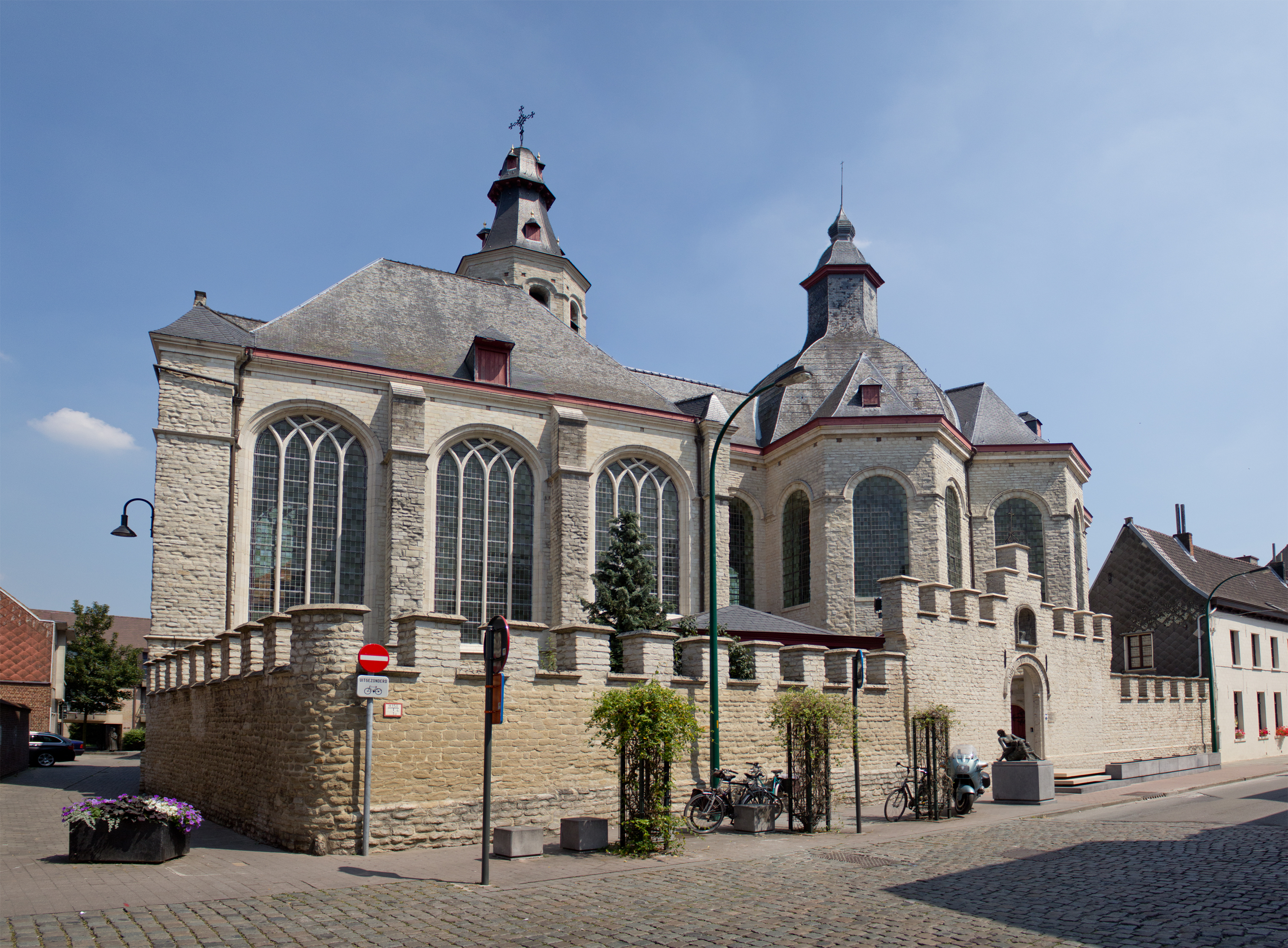
Side view of the basilica.

The Basilik du Onze-Lieve-Vrouw ten Troost Kerk (English: Basilica Church of Our Lady of Consolation), simply known as the Troostkerk, is a Roman Catholic minor basilica in Vilvoorde, Belgium. The shrine is dedicated to the Blessed Virgin Mary under the venerated title of Our Lady of Consolation. The history of the church and its Carmelite monastery (the oldest in Western Europe) go back 800 years.

Pope Benedict XVI signed the notarized decree which raised the shrine to Basilica on 1 March 2006. It was formally consecrated as a basilica on 7 May 2006 by the former Archbishop of Mechelen, Cardinal Godfried Danneels.

== Elevation to Basilica ==
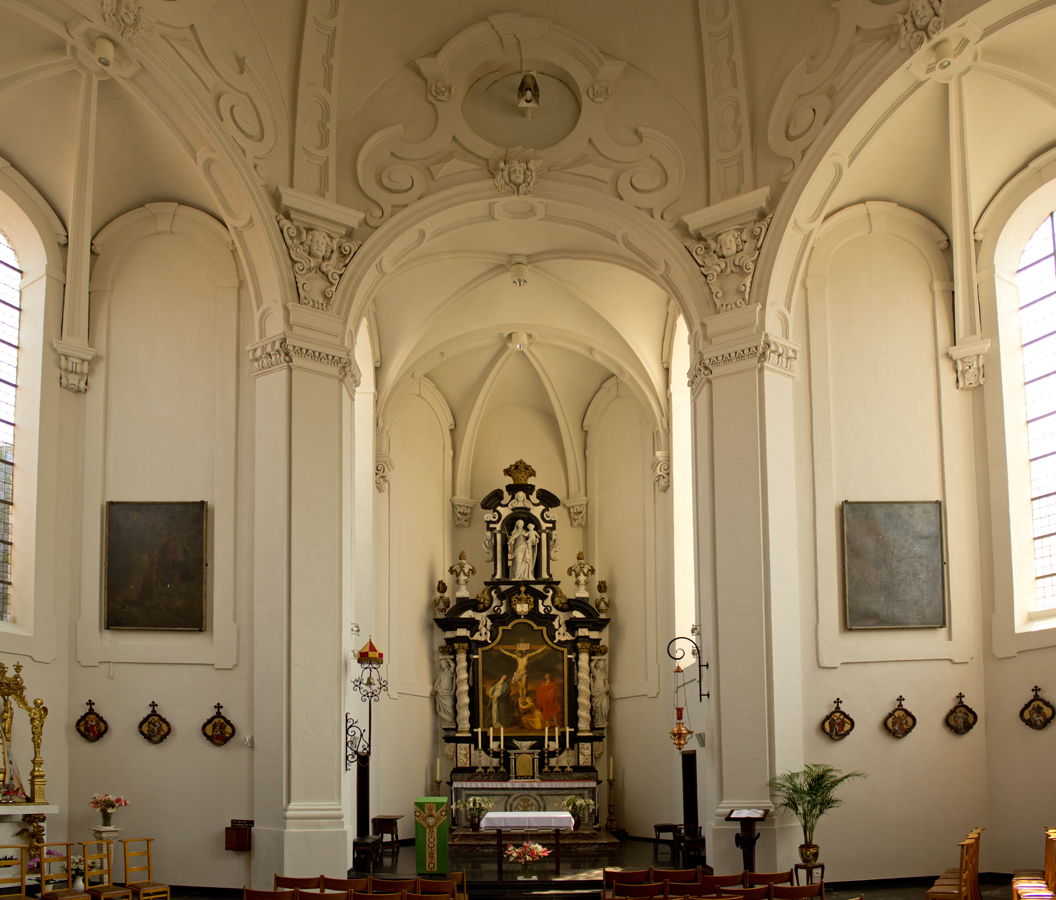
Main Altar of Our Lady of Consolation.

Owing to its important role as a pilgrimage destination, the Carmel has a particular significance to the city of Vilvoorde. The Troostkermis or annual fair and holiday of the city of Vilvoorde is still celebrated today, starting on the third Sunday after Easter. The church was elevated to the status of basilica, on 7 May 2006, and since that date pilgrims have begun visiting from other Belgian provinces.

== Gallery ==
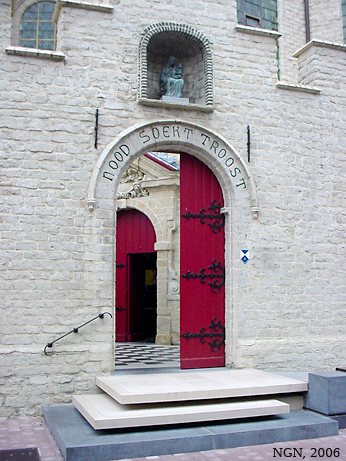
The entrance to the courtyard from Leuvensestraat

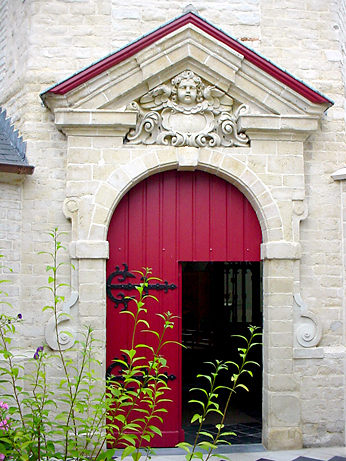
The entrance to the church from the courtyard

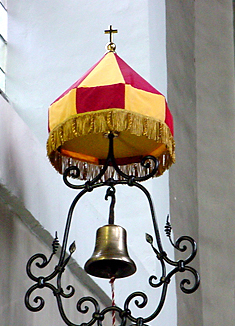
A bell and umbraculum

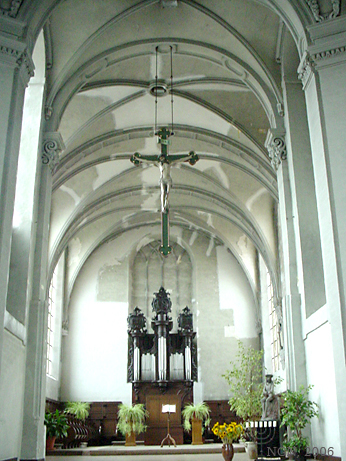
The church choir

== See also ==
- List of Catholic churches in Belgium
