= Church of Our Lady of Leliendaal, Mechelen =

Church of Our Lady of Leliendaal
- Dutch: Onze-Lieve-Vrouw van Leliëndaal
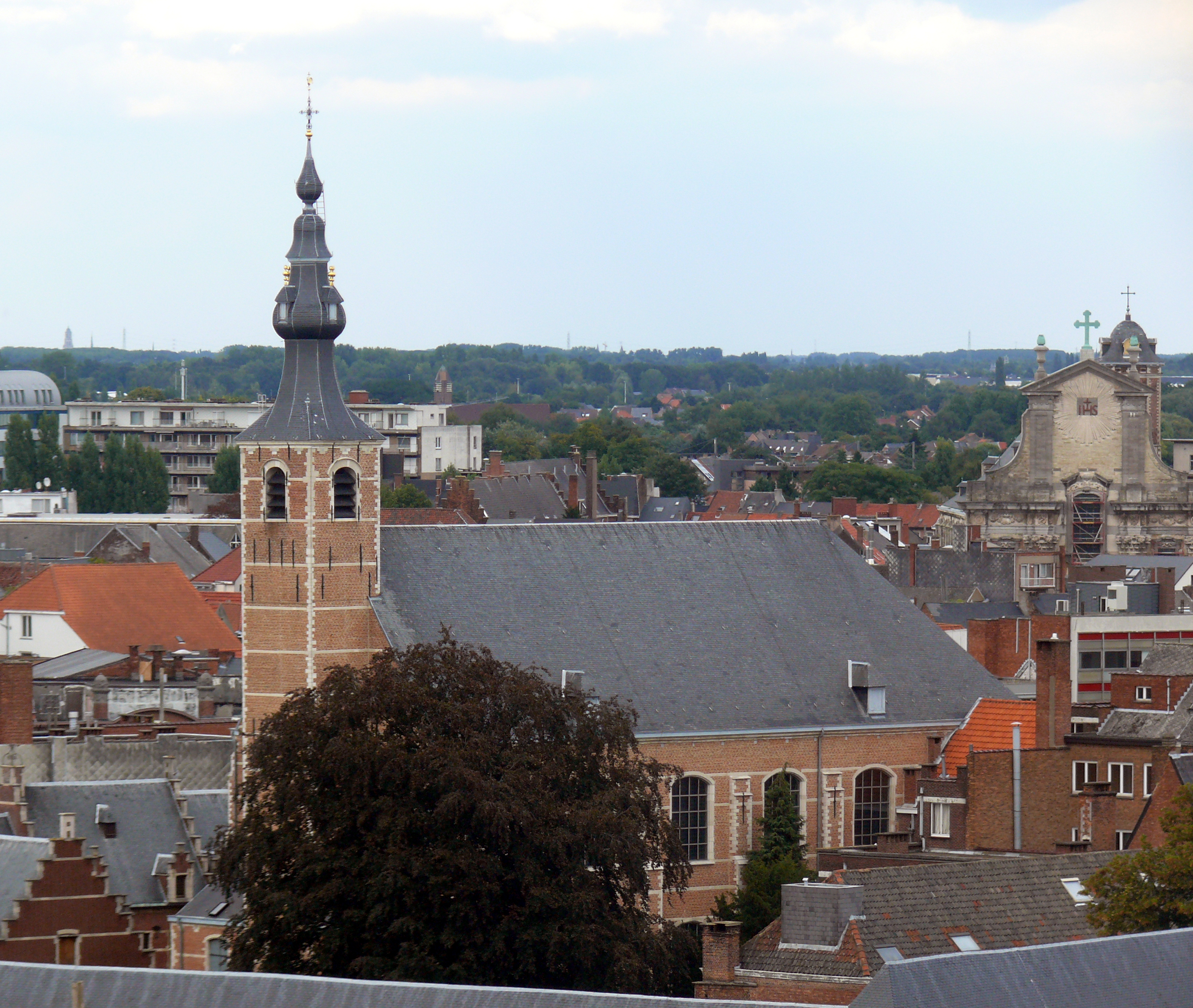
- Church of Our Lady of Leliendaal
- 51.025833°N 4.480833°E
- Location: Mechelen
- Country: Belgium
- Denomination: Roman Catholic
- Website: KerkMechelen.be

History
- Status: Active
- Founded: 1662
- Founder: Premonstratensians
- Dedication: Blessed Virgin Mary

Architecture
- Functional status: Church building
- Heritage designation: National Monument
- Architect: Lucas Faydherbe
- Style: Baroque

The Church of Our Lady of Leliendaal (Dutch: Onze-Lieve-Vrouw van Leliëndaal) is a Roman Catholic church in Mechelen, Belgium, served by the Society of Jesus. It was designed by Lucas Faydherbe and is a protected structure, designated by the city council of Mechelen as one of its eight historic churches.

== History ==
=== Foundation ===
The site of the church was originally owned by the Norbertine St. Michael's Abbey in Antwerp.

The architect was Lucas Faydherbe, a native of Mechelen and a nephew of Lucas Franchoys the Younger, who had studied with Peter Paul Rubens in Antwerp.

The foundation stone was laid in 1662. Construction was delayed on multiple occasions, because the façade tilted dangerously forward. In 1664, the façade was demolished and rebuilt. In 1670, the first Mass was said and in 1674 the church was solemnly inaugurated.

=== Napoleonic Wars ===
In the early 19th century, during the Napoleonic Wars, the church was seriously neglected and half of it was turned into a hospice for the poor of the city. The furnishings were sold and holes were made in the gables for people to be able to see out and over the church to help defend it against attack. A wall was placed in the church between the second and third windows for the establishment of an infirmary.

=== Re-opening ===
In 1834, it re-opened under the administration of the Jesuits. Through the cooperation of the nearby Minor Seminary and the Civil Hospices, it was restored and equipped with new furniture and the internal walls were removed. In 1900–01, the Jesuits changed the floor plan and moved the choir to the gallery in the west of the church. Later in the 20th century, a sacristy was constructed in the southwest part of the church. Also, a grotto to Our Lady of Lourdes was built and new furniture was purchased.

== Gallery ==
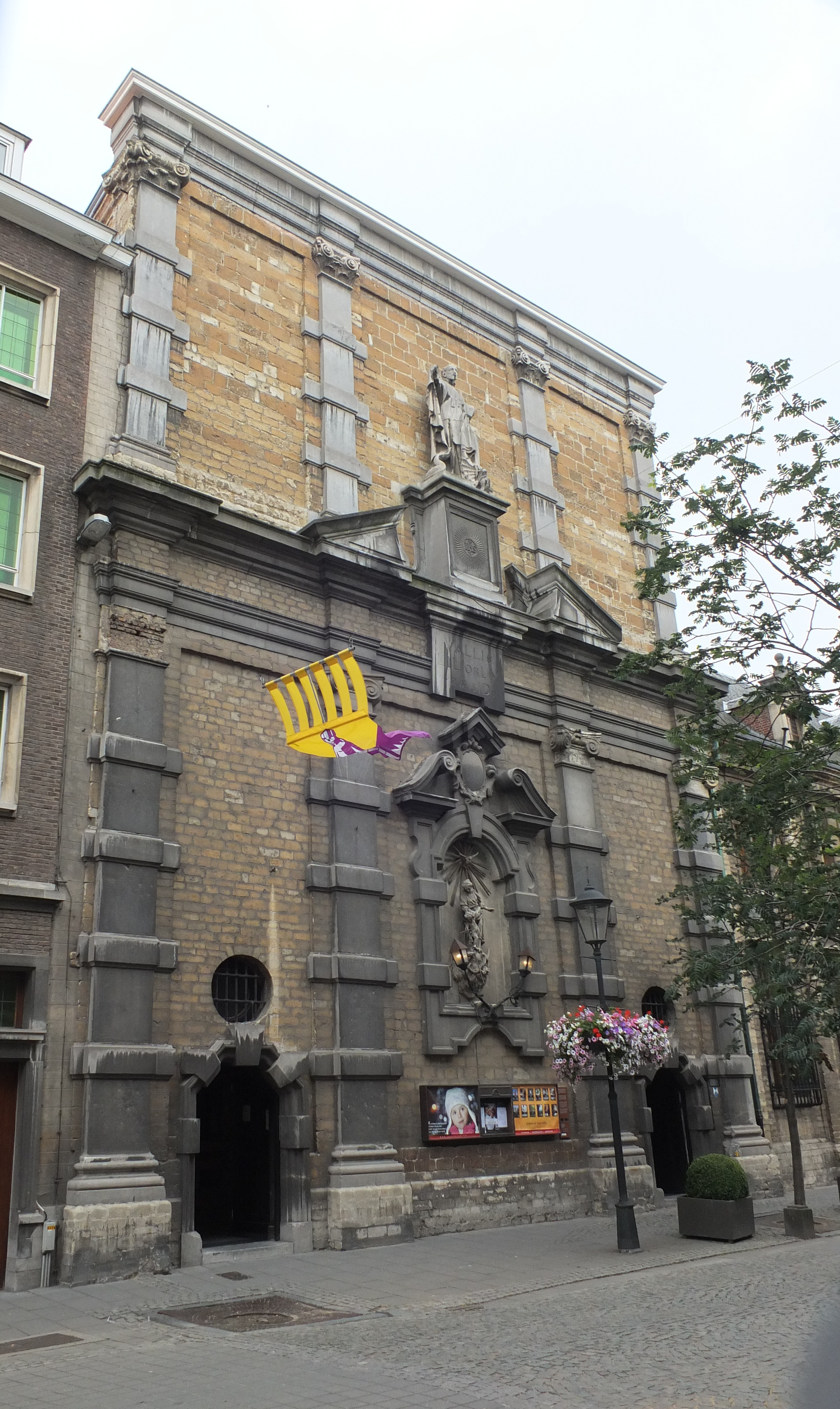
Front entrance

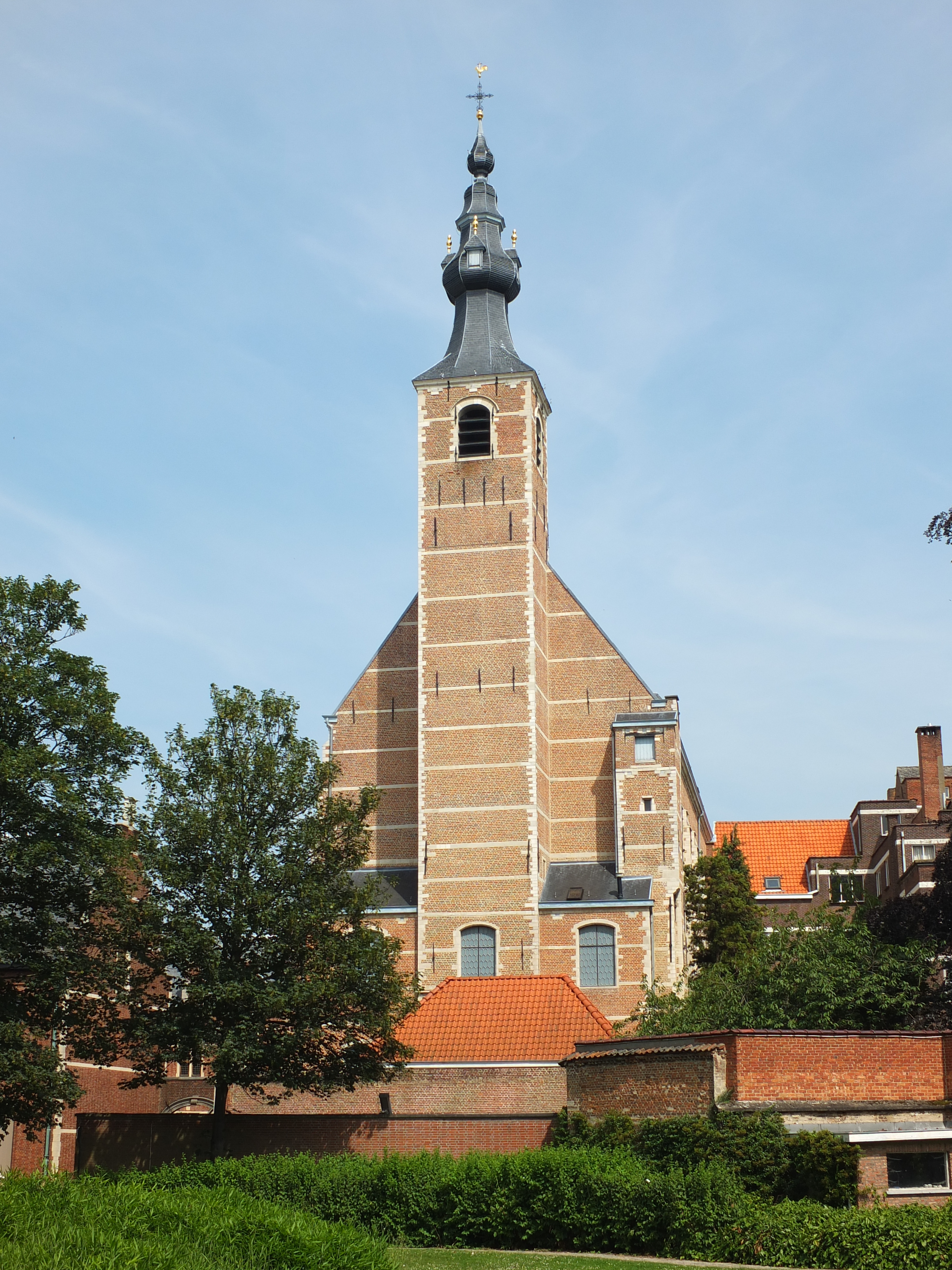
Back of the church

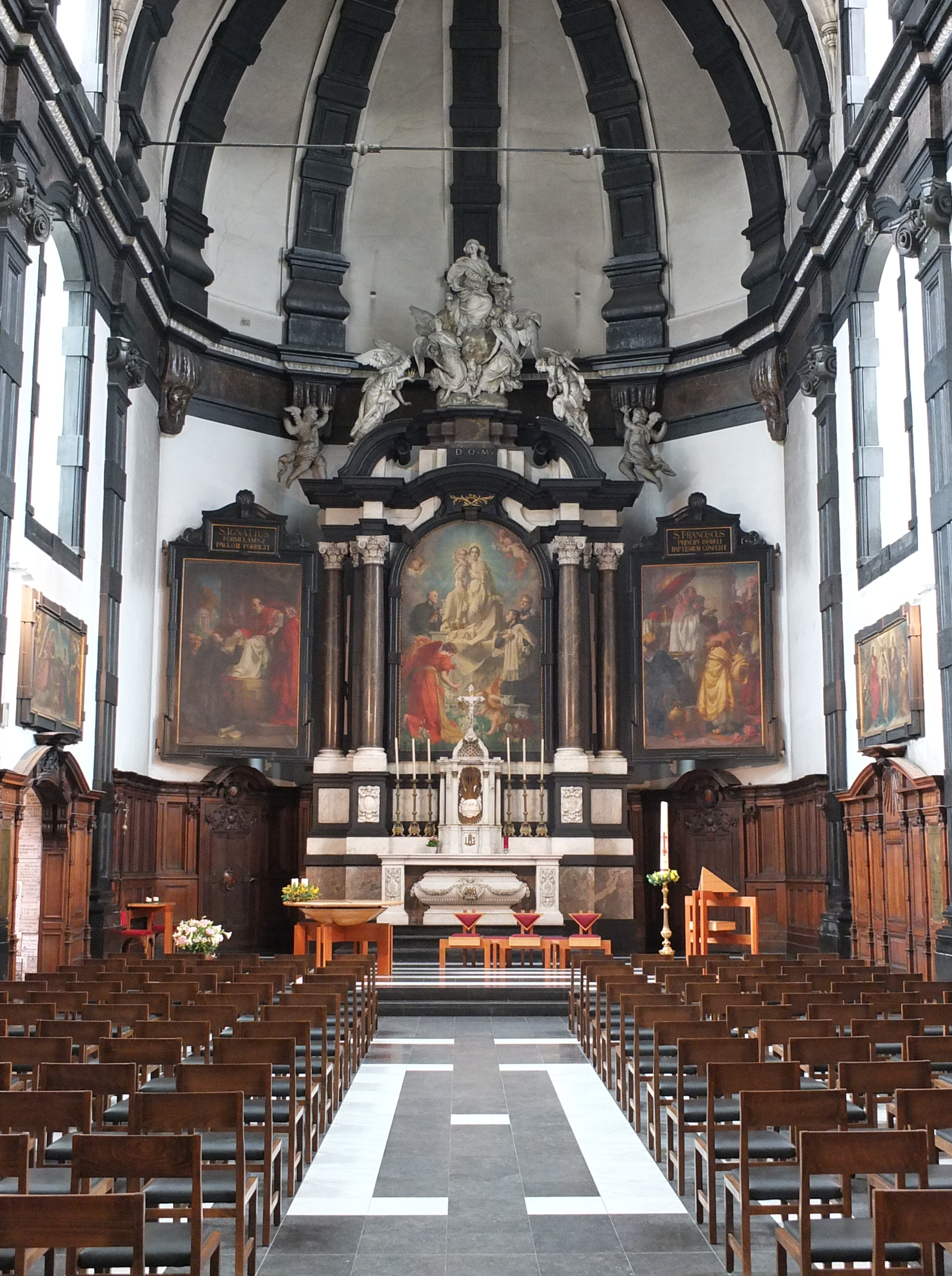
Nave

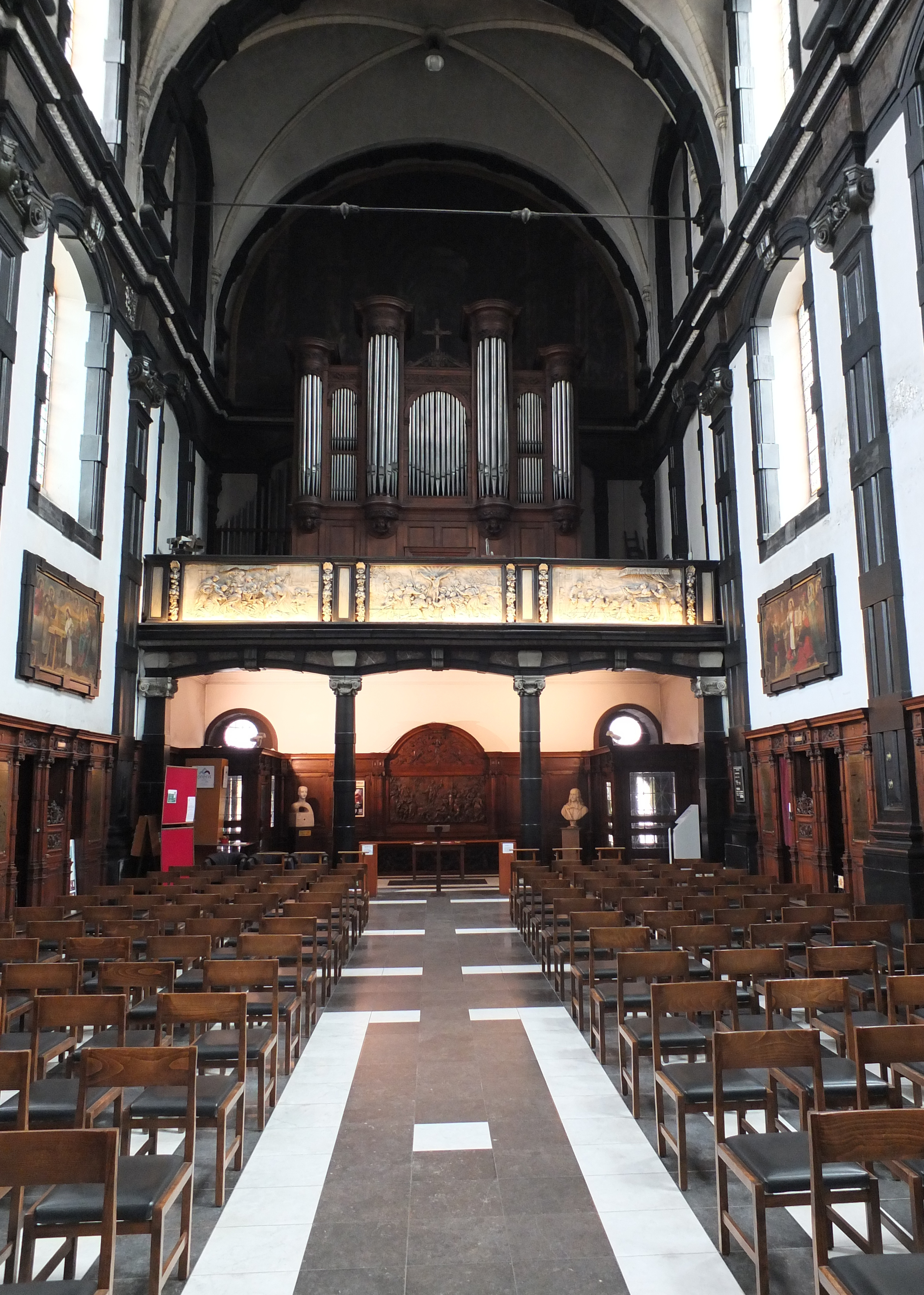
Organ

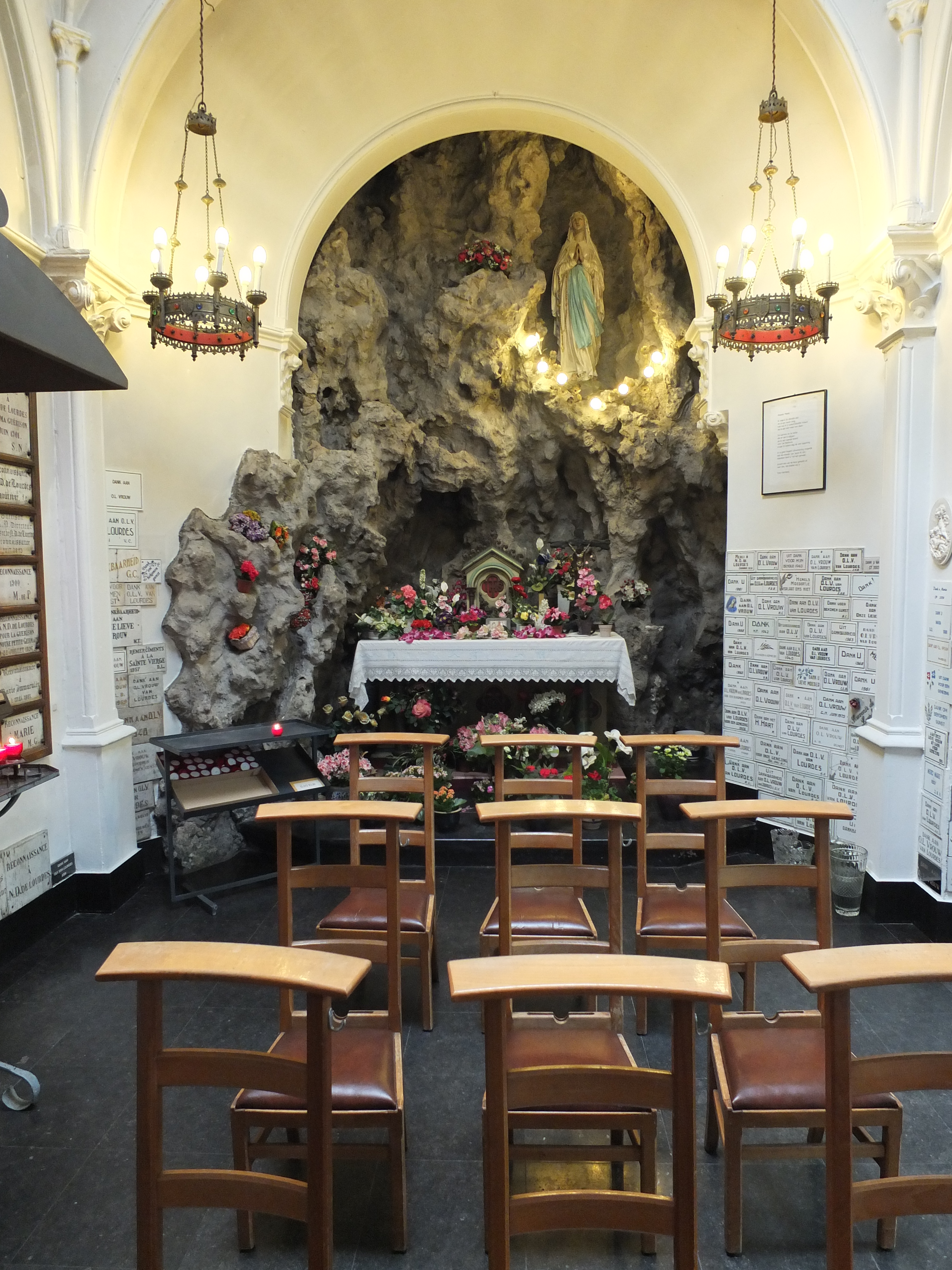
Side grotto

== See also ==
- List of Jesuit sites in Belgium
- List of Catholic churches in Belgium
- Archdiocese of Mechelen-Brussels
