= St. Lawrence's Church, Ename =

St. Lawrence's Church
- Dutch: Sint-Laurentiuskerk
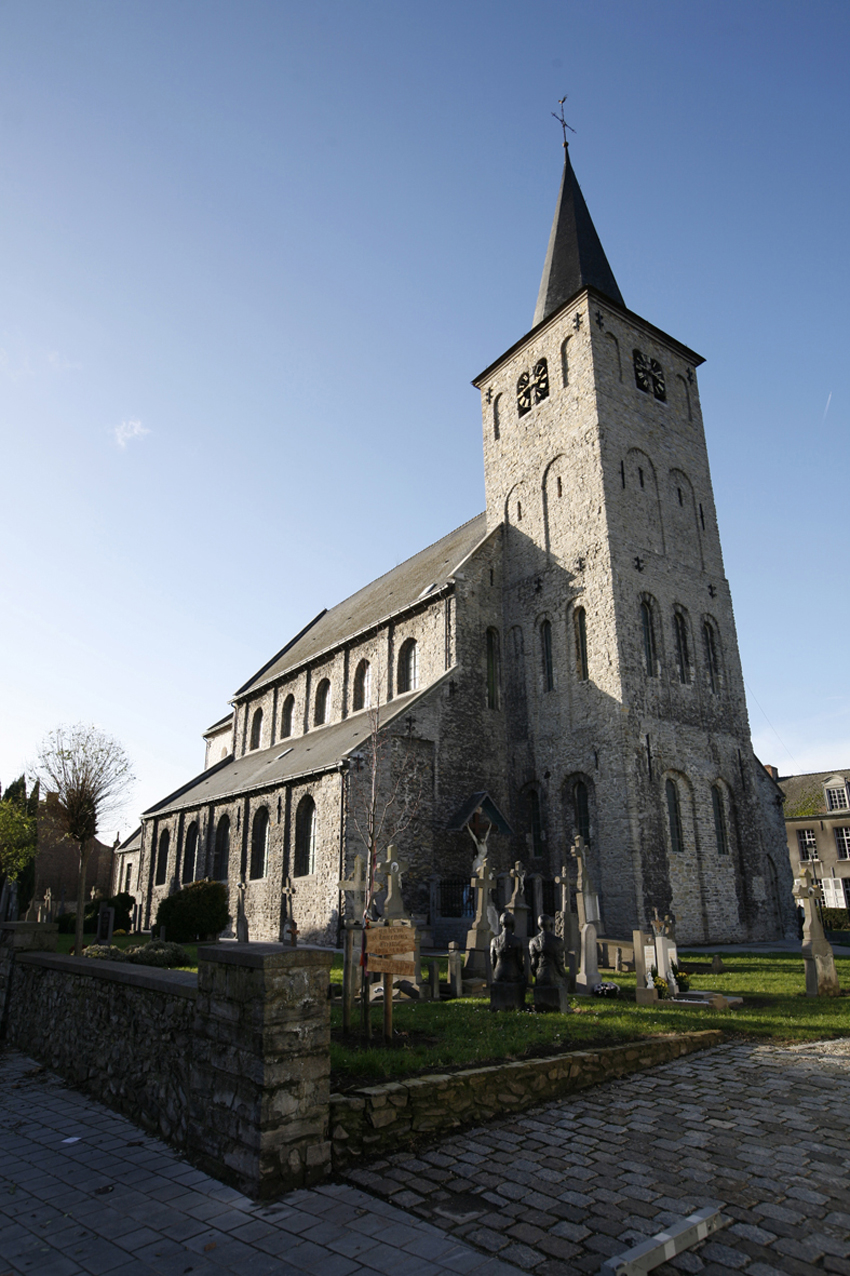
- St. Lawrence's Church
- St. Lawrence's Church
- 50.855028°N 3.631998°E
- Location: Enameplein, 9700 Ename
- Country: Belgium
- Denomination: Roman Catholic

History
- Status: Parish church
- Founder: Herman of Verdun

Architecture
- Functional status: Active
- Heritage designation: Bouwkundig Erfgoed
- Style: Ottonian architecture
- Years built: 10th century

Administration
- Diocese: Ghent
- Deanery: Oudenaarde

St. Lawrence's Church (Dutch: Sint-Laurentiuskerk) is the parish church of Ename, Oudenaarde, Belgium, dedicated to Saint Lawrence. It was built shortly before the year 1000 by Herman, Count of Verdun and is the only surviving Ottonian building in the village.

== History ==
Ename was founded around 990 by Godfrey I, Count of Verdun, on the river Scheldt, the border between the Holy Roman Empire and the County of Flanders. Godfrey and his wife Mathilda of Saxony built a keep surrounded by a walled castrum, which protected the trade settlement. Their son Herman of Verdun, count of Brabant, founded the Church of St. Lawrence shortly before the year 1000. Herman showed his loyalty to the Ottonian emperor both with the architectural concept of the building, which had an eastern and a western choir, and with the choice of the patron saint. The Ottonian emperors had a special veneration for St Lawrence because on 10 August 955, the saint's feast day, Otto I won the Battle of Lechfeld against the Hungarians that had been regularly plundering Europe. At that moment Otto was the King of East Francia and after the victory the German lords raised him on their shields to celebrate his triumph and proclaimed him emperor. A few years later, on the strength of this acclamation, Otto went to Rome and had himself crowned Holy Roman Emperor by Pope John XII.

When control of Ename passed to the count of Flanders Baldwin V and Saint Salvator abbey was built, the village and the church became part of its properties. St. Lawrence's Church became the parish church of the village and has remained in use until today.

== Architecture ==
St. Lawrence's Church was built with Tournai limestone. Archaeological excavations have shown that the church was originally conceived with a hall ground plan. During construction work, it was immediately enlarged and transformed into a building with a basilica floor plan with two lateral naves. It has an eastern and a western choir, according with the Ottonian architectural style. The eastern choir had two storeys: the second floor hosted a chapel, probably with a stone altar, which was open on the main nave thanks to a three-arched window. In the lunette above it, facing the main nave, a Majestas Domini was depicted in frescos, using lapis as blue pigment. The dimension of the church and the preciosity of the painting stated its importance and witnessed the intention of their founders of transforming Ename in a main trade center.

When the village became property of the abbey, in the 11th century, the commercial activity of the trade settlement moved to the near center of Oudenaarde and the population decreased. The church was then too big for the village and the abbey transformed the lateral naves in several side chapels dedicated to the cult of different saints.

In the 16th and 17th century the church was heavily modified. An octagonal structure was added on the top of the tower. Even if later removed, the weight of this addition provoked several damages in the structure of the tower. During the 1990s it was necessary to start the restoration of the building.

3D reconstruction of St. Lawrence's Church

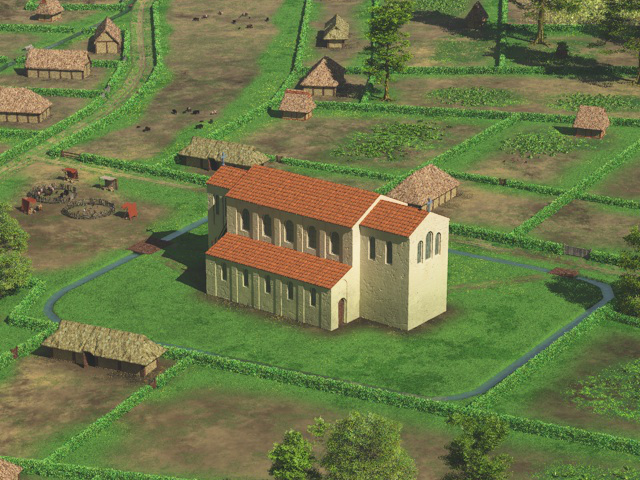
Around 1020

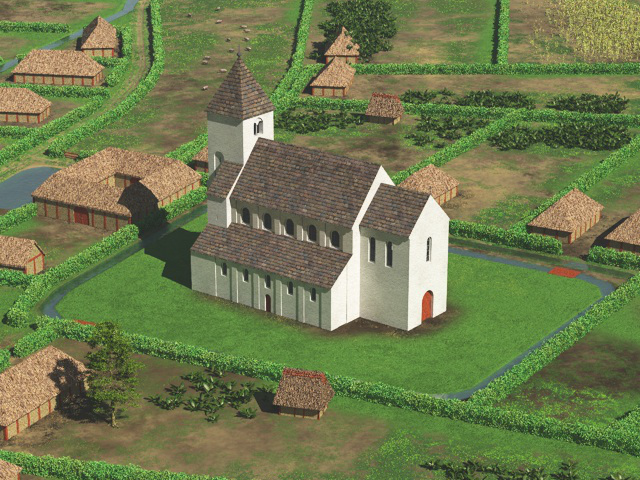
Around 1300

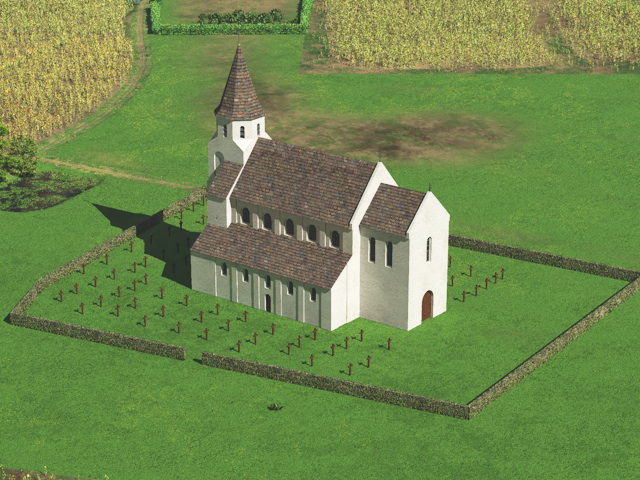
Around 1590

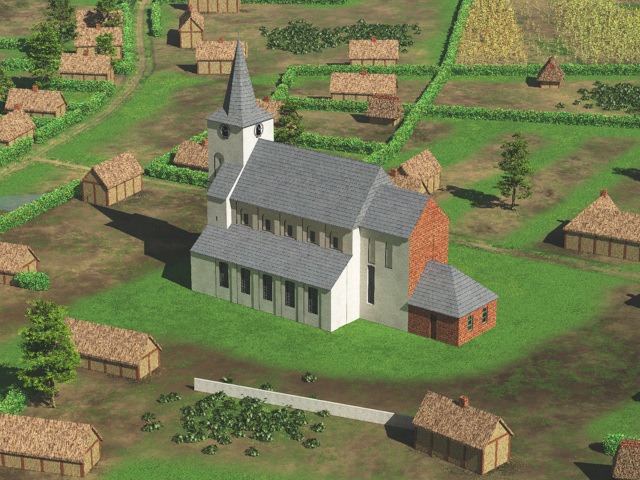
Around 1780

=== Timeline of the changes ===
- Around 1175 the church was damaged by fire, traces of which are still visible on the stones on the outside of the building.
- Around 1500 the church was restored and modified in several parts both in the inside and on the outside. The double east choir was substituted with a high space demarcated by a gothic arch. The final part of the bell tower was redesigned with an octagonal shape.
- 1578 - 1592 in this period the church was probably abandoned. After the iconoclastic fury of 1566, the tension between Catholics and Protestants in the area was constant. In 1572 Oudenaarde was conquered by the Protestants and in 1578 the monks of Saint Salvator abbey fled. They finally returned around 1592, as a record of 1593 attested the damage in the building. In a layer of the church corresponding to this period, archaeologists have found the remains of several pellets composed of mice bones. They consider these remains as evidence of the disuse of the church, where birds were able to easily enter and nest. The works of restoration of the church ended around 1622, when the repair of the roof was completed.
- 1654 a new rectangular tower of the church was built.
- 1655 the abbey commissioned a new Baroque furnishing for the Lady Altar. In 1666 they commissioned a painting of the Nativity from Simon de Paepe, a painter from Oudenaarde.
- 1762 the orientation of the church was transformed: the portal in the wider west choir was closed and the space was transformed into the main altar. A gate was opened in the east choir, towards the main square.
- 1770 a new organ was placed above the entrance in the east choir, where it remained until the restoration of 1999. The organ was made by the organist Van Petegem of Ghent.

== Archaeology and restorations ==
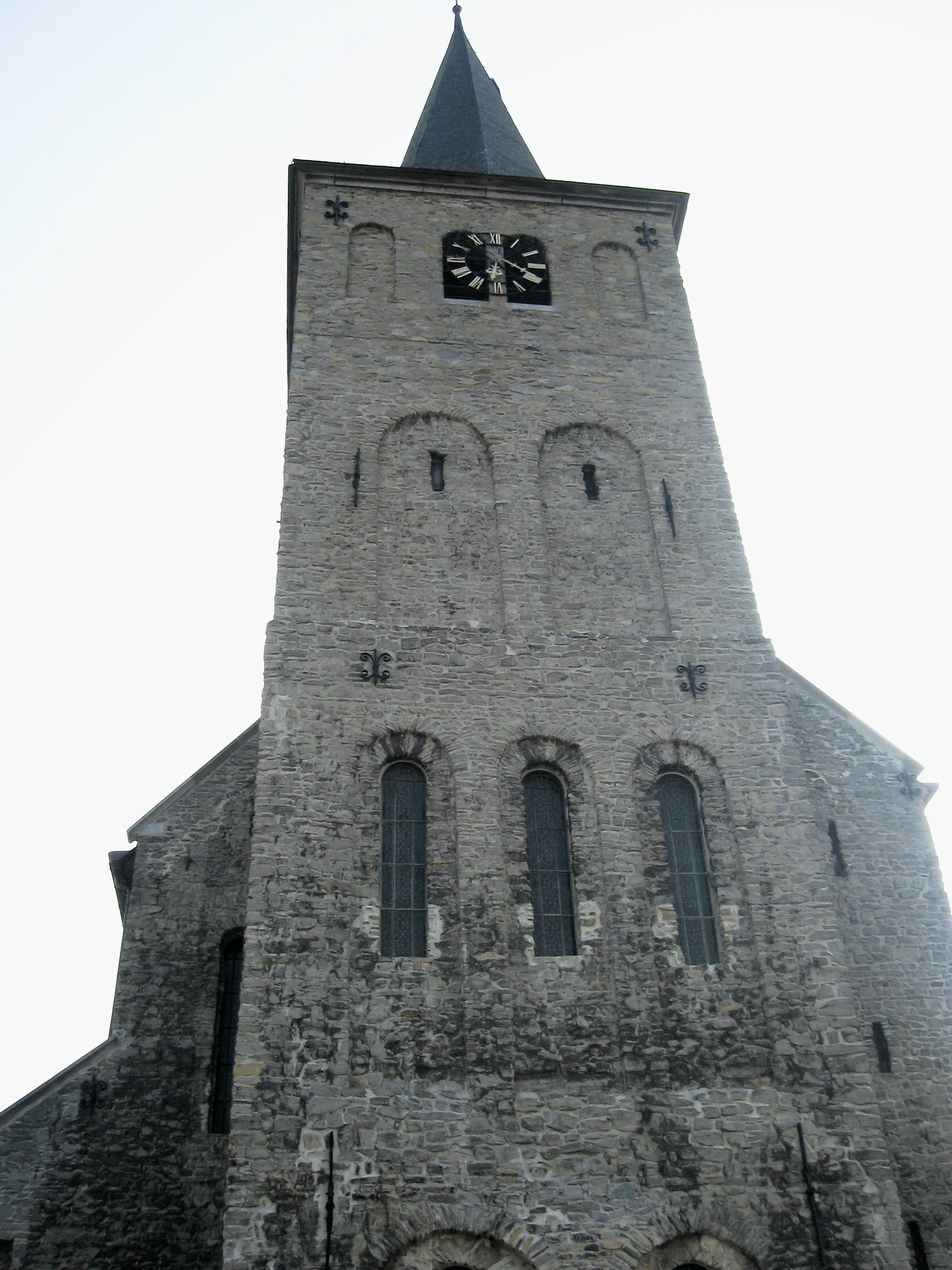
The west choir and tower

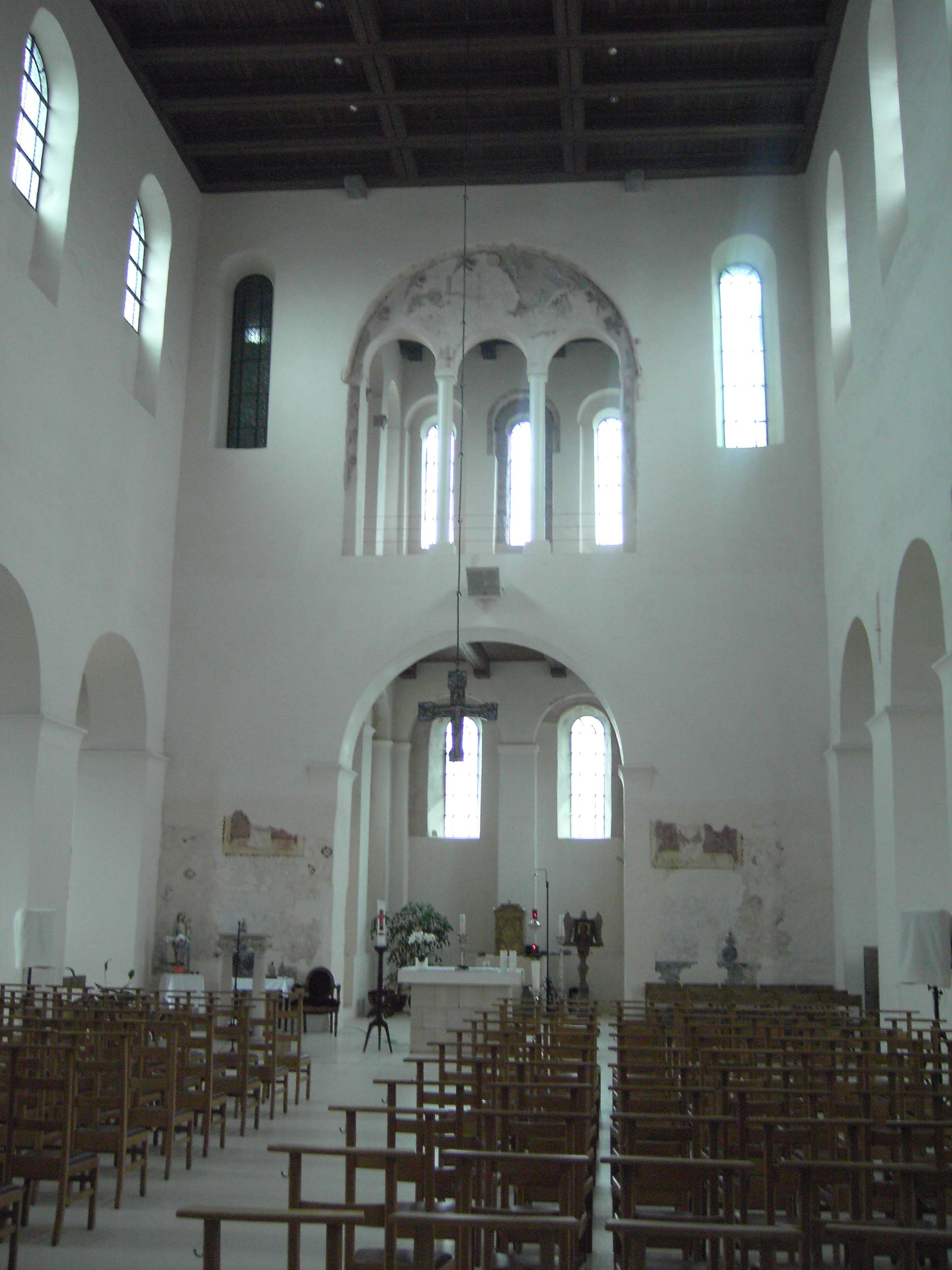
Church interior, east choir

Due to severe cracks in the tower of the church, in 1993 it was necessary to start the restoration of the building. On that occasion the foundations of the church were inspected. It was discovered that they were structurally sound, but they revealed some interesting features that pushed the archaeologist to plan a systematic research in the church. Work started in 1999 and lasted until 2002 and foreseen the excavation of the total surface of the church and its restoration. A European project was launched that aimed at the complete study of the building and at the reconstruction of its original 10th-century appearance by following a rigid scientifically supervised procedure. As the church was a used religious building, it was also important to preserve its role as an aggregation point for the local community.

Article 11 of the Venice Charter for the restoration of buildings says:

The valid contributions of all periods to the building of a monument must be respected, since unity of style is not the aim of a restoration. When a building includes the superimposed work of different periods, the revealing of the underlying state can only be justified in exceptional circumstances and when what is removed is of little interest and the material which is brought to light is of great historical, archaeological or aesthetic value, and its state of preservation good enough to justify the action. Evaluation of the importance of the elements involved and the decision as to what may be destroyed cannot rest solely on the individual in charge of the work.

St. Lawrence's Church was proven to be one of the few preserved Ottonian buildings of the region and it was decided to restore the traces of its original structure and integrate the missing elements following thorough research and comparison with similar buildings of the same period. Each integration was made with recognizable materials, using non-permanent techniques to facilitate the removal in case of future restorations. Although this restoration removed almost completely the traces of the evolution of the building through centuries, the appearance of the church was documented and it is shown today thanks to a digital application that gives to visitors some information about all the research done on the church.

=== Excavations ===
Excavations revealed that the floor level of the church had been elevated over the centuries. Several traces of the land use in Roman times have been found. Some fragments of Roman pottery were found in a waste pit in the area in front of the east choir. A bronze fibula was found in the main nave.

In the church some tombs have also been excavated. One of them had the walls decorated with the Cross of Lorraine, which dated the grave at the Burgundian period, between 1384-1482. Under a side entrance on the east side of the church, today used as baptistery, it was found the tomb of a woman. Her bones have been dated with C14 and resulted to be the oldest human remains of the church. In total, the rests of 180 people have been found in the church.

All over the church, a layer of burned material was found. The fire happened around 1170 and 1180 and destroyed the roof of the church. Among the burnt material there were molten pieces of glass, scorched plaster chunks and charred grain. The presence of grain suggested that the attic of the church was used to store the harvest of the village. Under the west choir, the foundations of a structure have been found. Due to the tight relationship between the family of Verdun who erected the church and the Imperial family, it was proposed the presence of a throne similar to the Throne of Charlemagne in the Palatine Chapel of Aachen.

=== Restorations ===
When the plaster was removed from the walls of the church, an unknown history of the building was revealed. In the west choir, where at that moment was the main altar, it was discovered a series of blind niches closed with bricks, and the traces of a portal opened in the original wall and later closed with bricks as well. Once opened, the niches revealed the original medieval plaster, and some traces of the original decoration were still visible. In one of them, the depiction of a Madonna with the Child were in a fairly good preservation state. In the east choir reappeared the precious fresco of the Majestas Domini, painted in the lunette above the three-arched window of the upper choir. The two-storeys structure of the choir was a distinctive feature of the Ottonian church, later modified to update the church at the Gothic style and open a high ogival arch. Also the two windows of the east choir preserved the original decoration. There are two tondos: one shows a man holding some fishes, and another shows a man with some breads, with a reference to the Eucharist. Several other fragments of the original medieval decoration were preserved on the walls. They have been consolidated and restored.

When the plaster was removed, it was clear that the pillars were originally square and they had a capital that had been chiseled away. These elements were restored in their original shape. Finally, the floor level was lowered close to the original one and the church was plastered in white. The history of the restoration, an explanation of the important discoveries and some images of the church before the works are shown to the public thanks to an interactive application on display in the church.

== Gallery ==
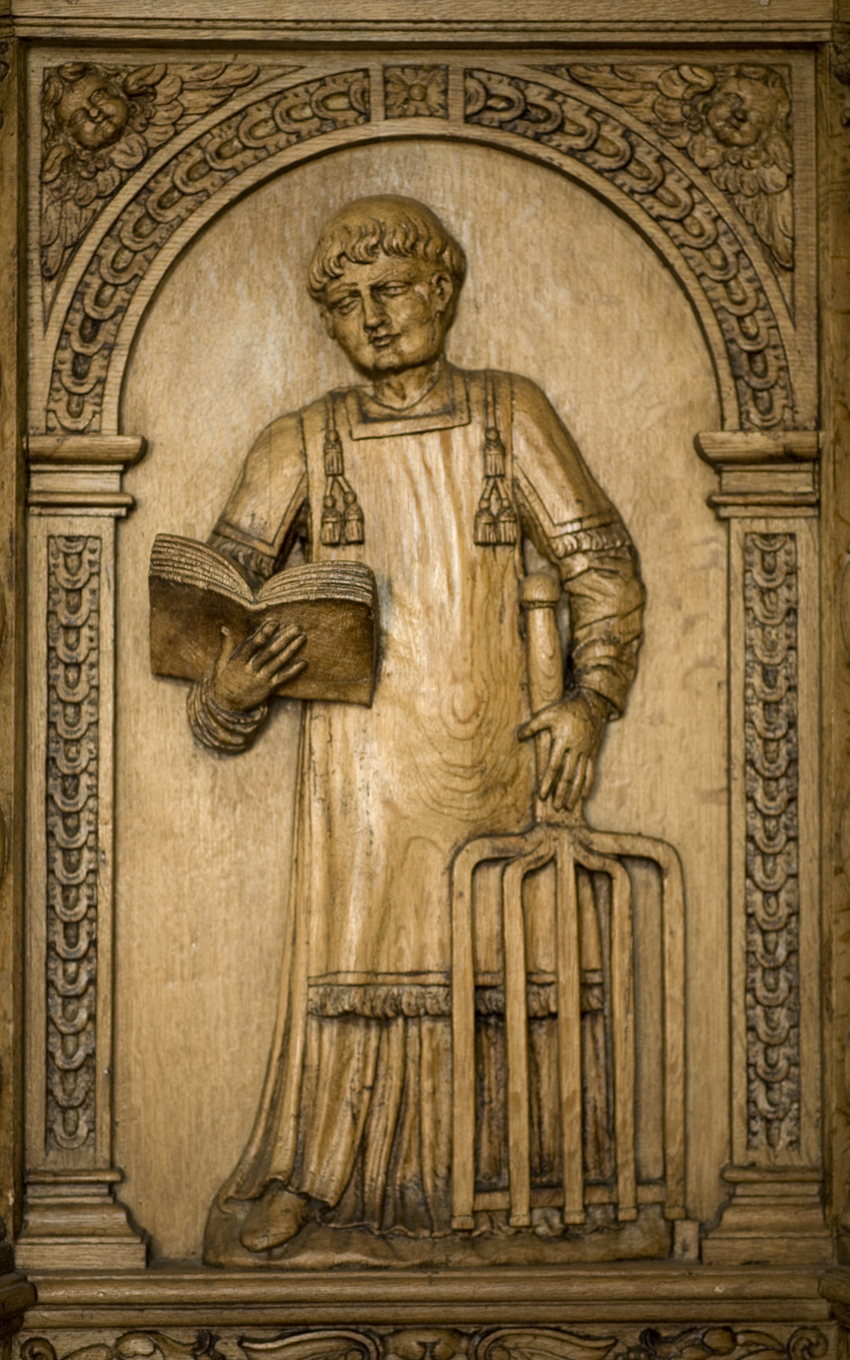
Wooden pulpit

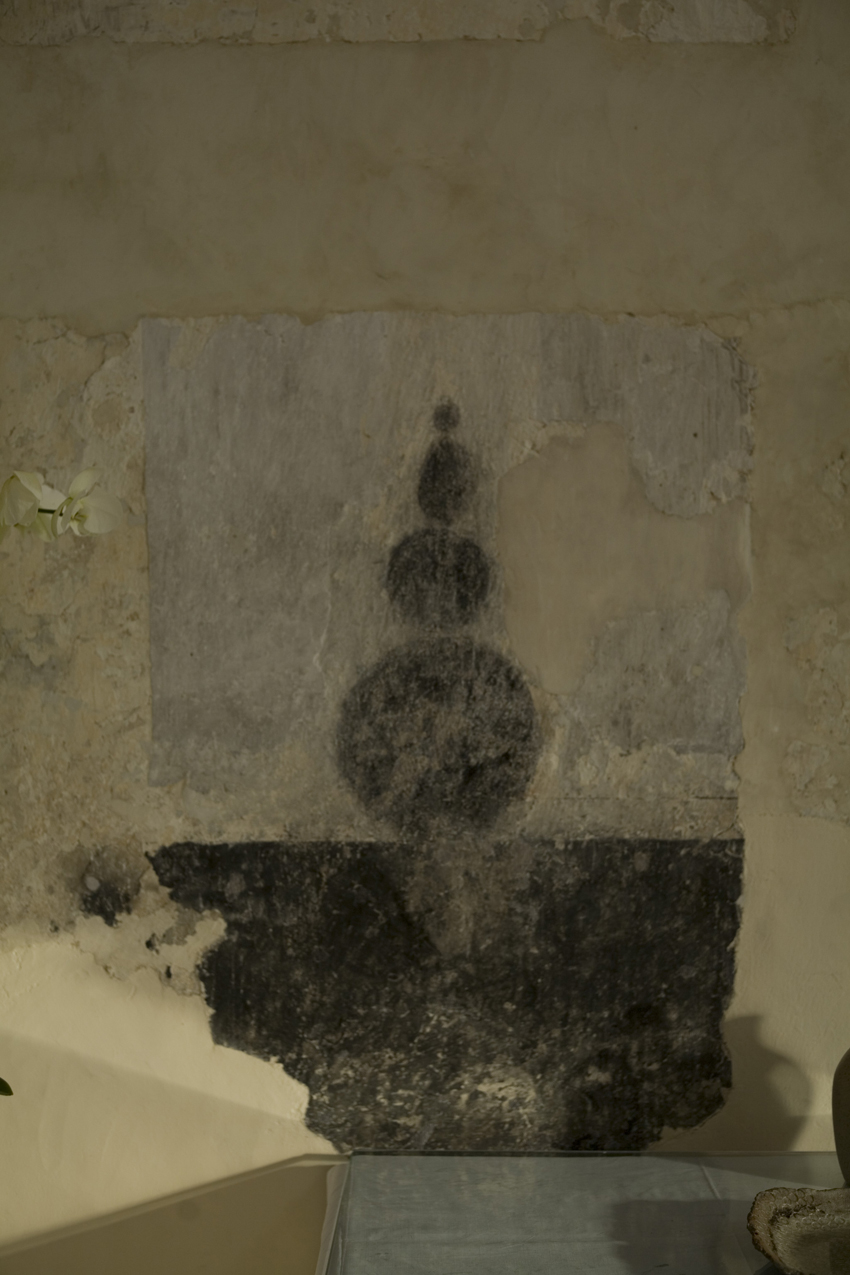
Wall paintings. Gothic decoration.

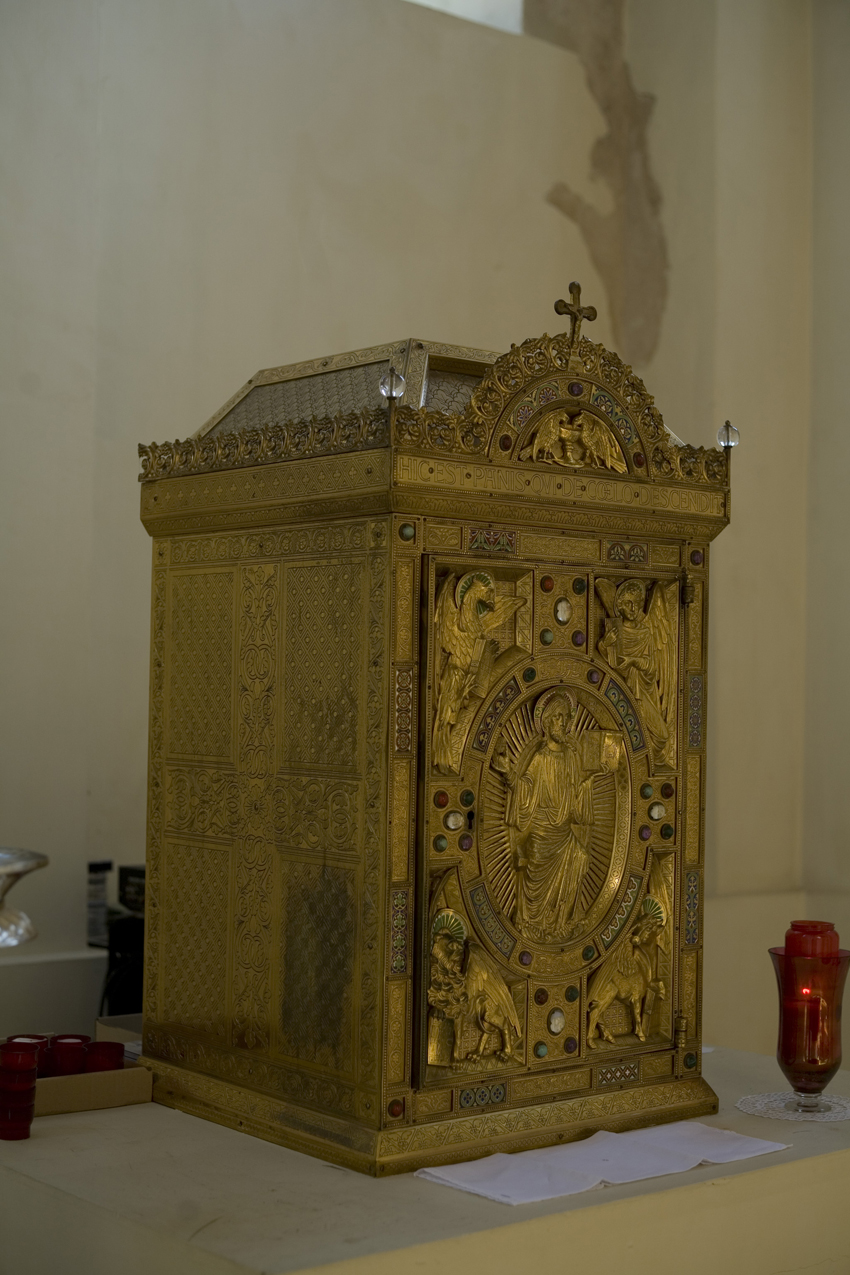
Tabernacle

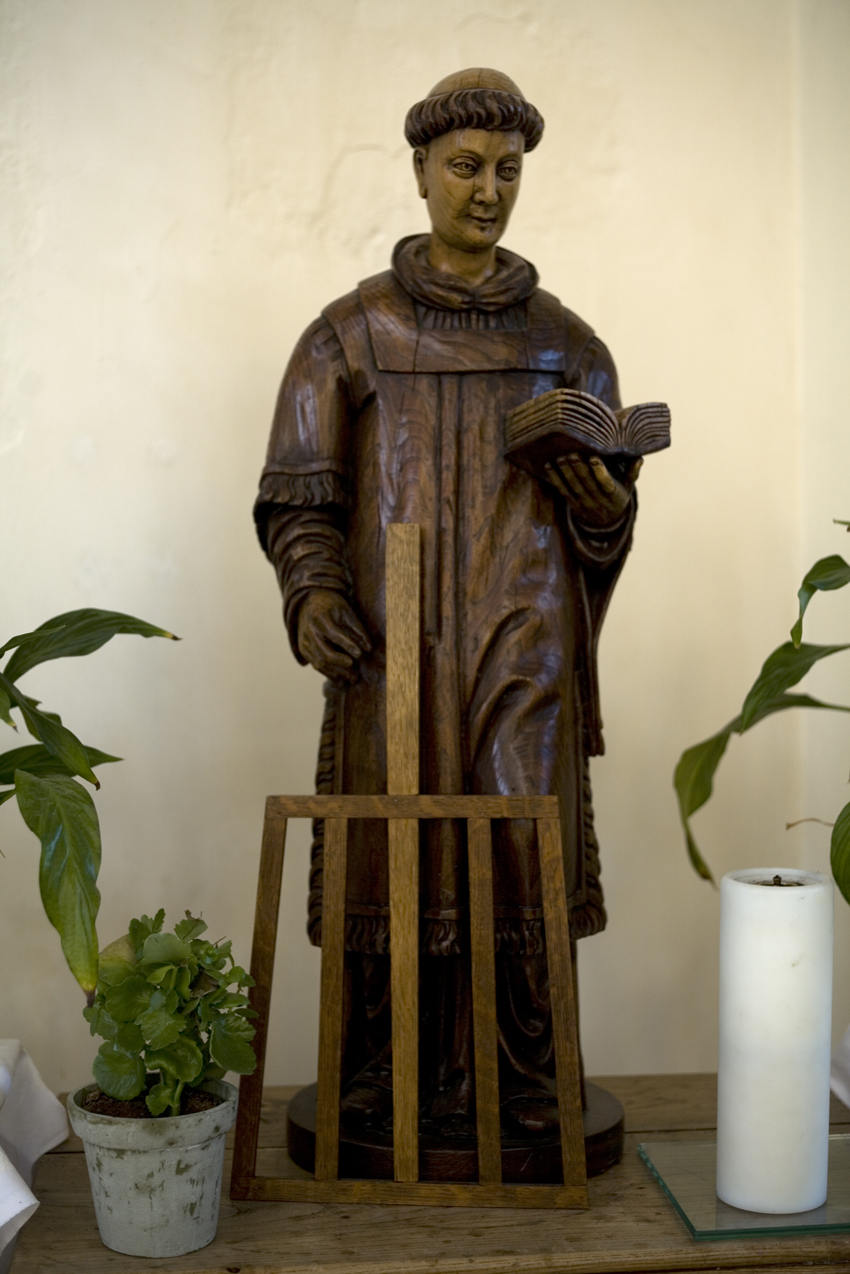
Wooden statue of Saint Lawrence

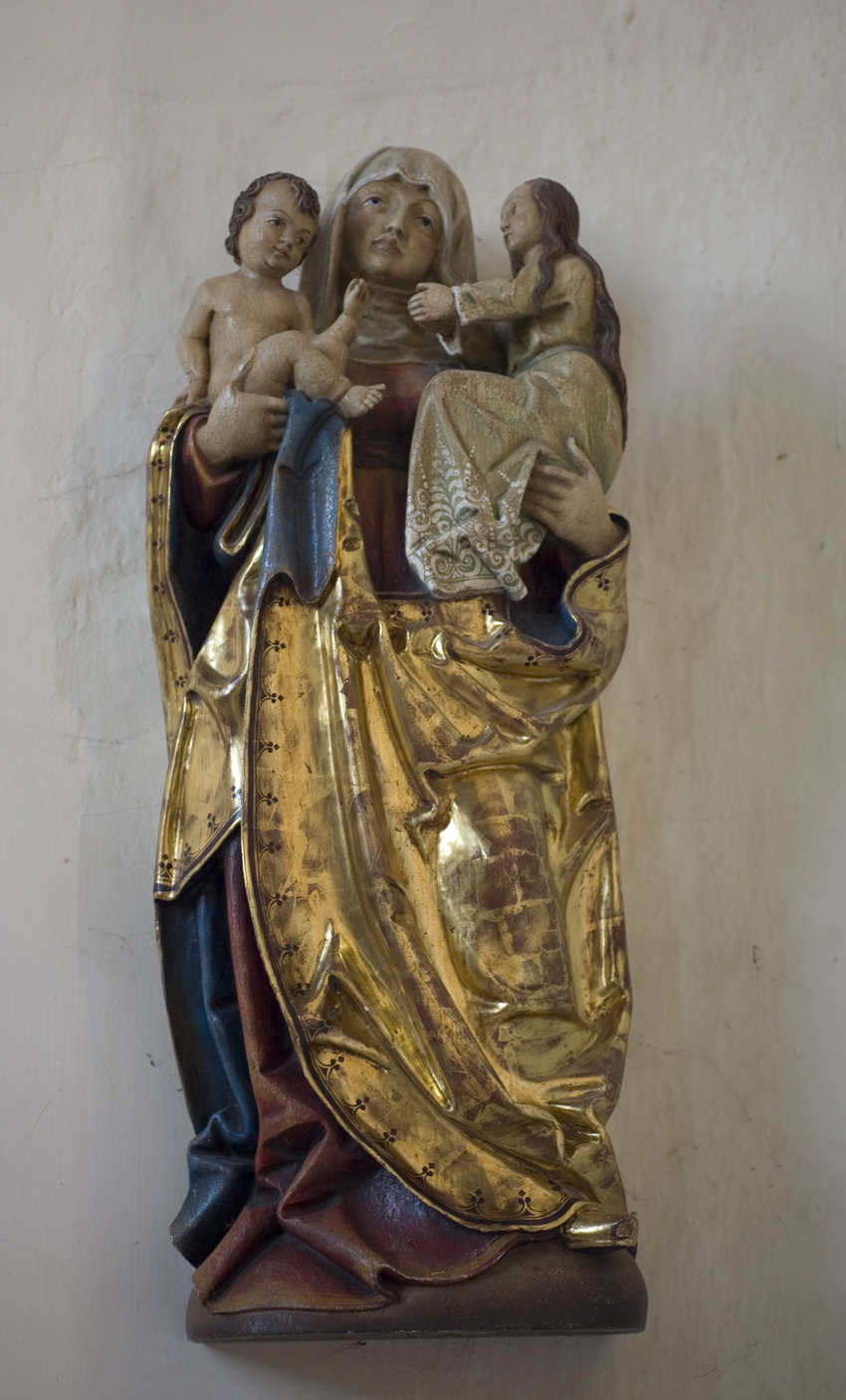
Wooden statue of Saint Anna

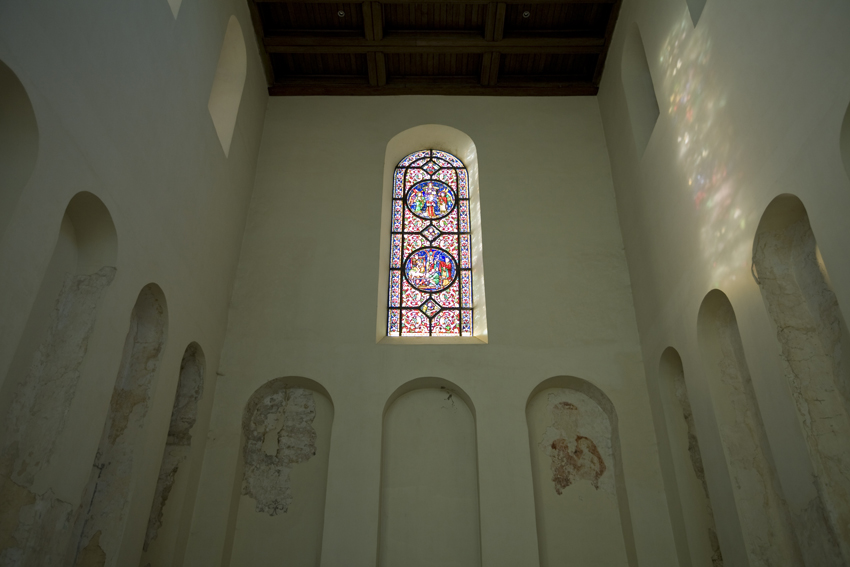
West choir. Fragment of the medieval depiction of the Madonna with the Child.

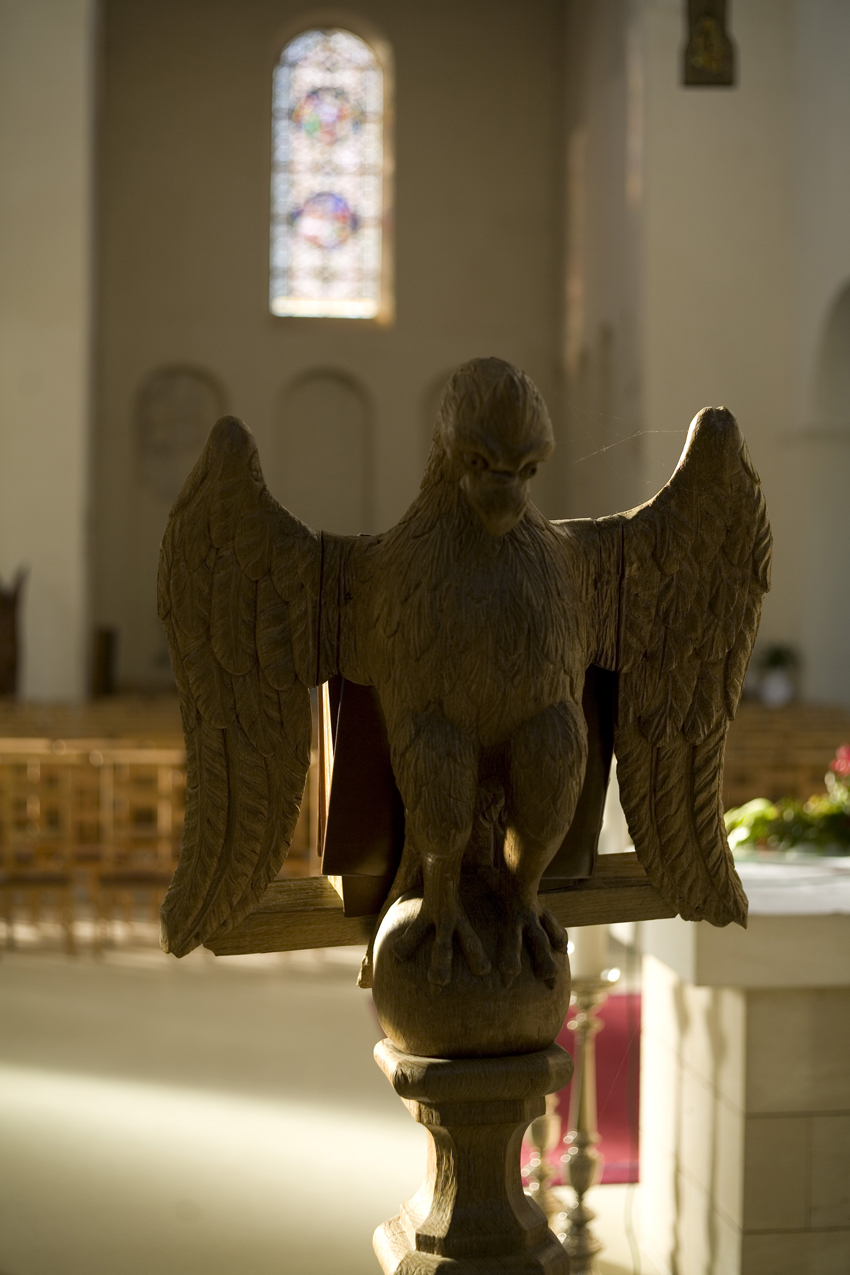
Bookstand

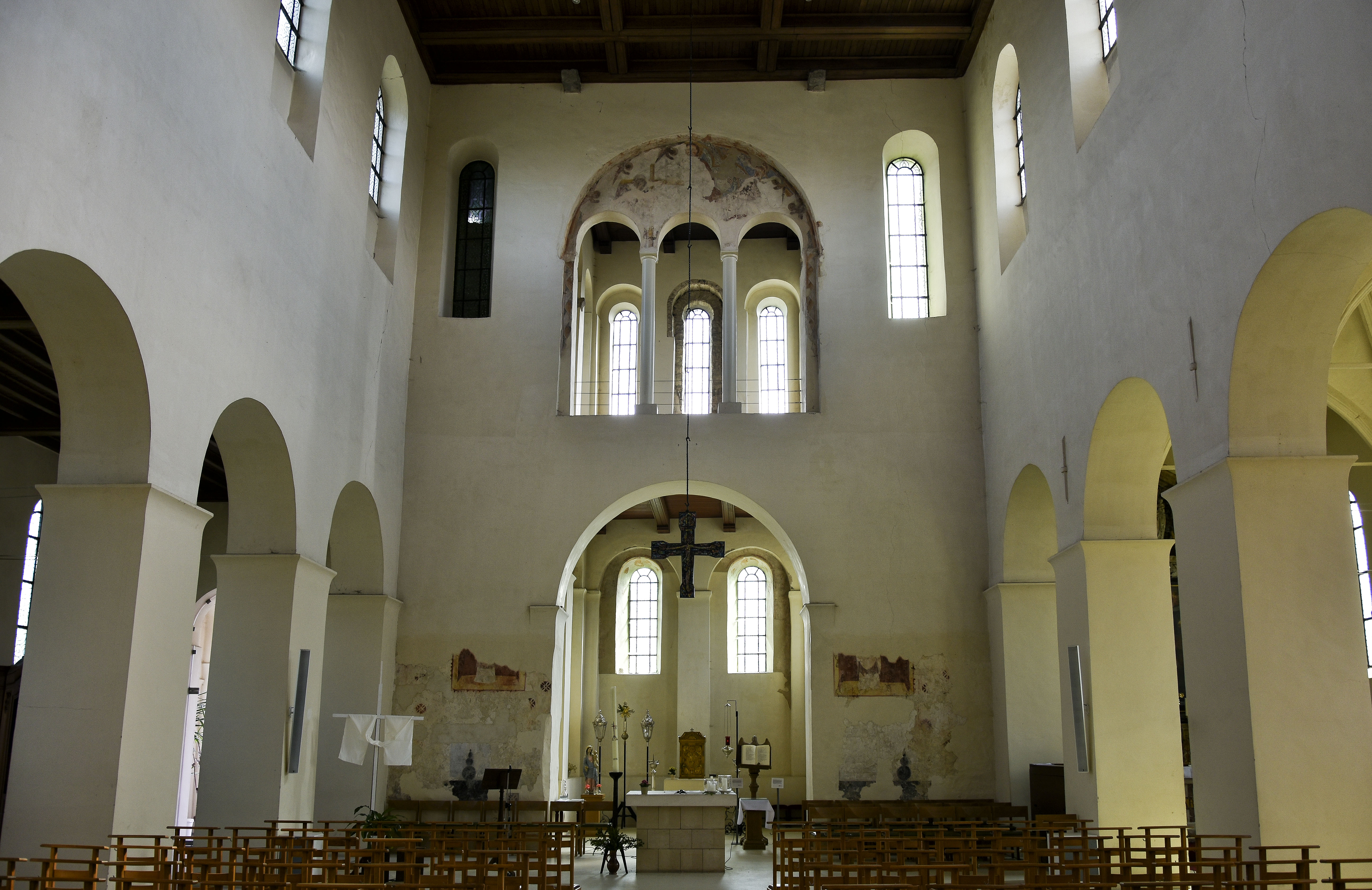
The two-storey east choir. The Majestas Dominy in the lunette and fragments of other original wall paintings.

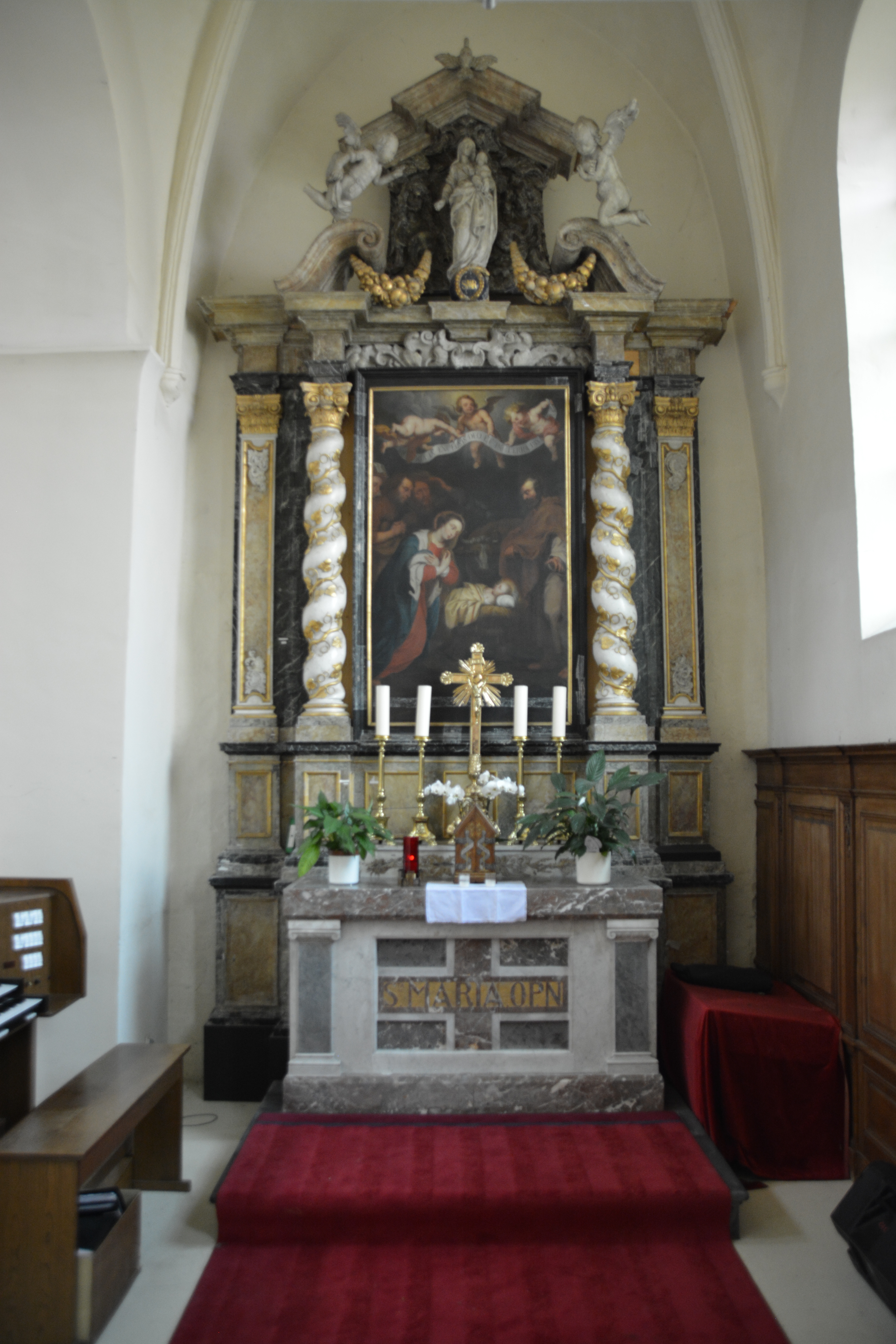
Nativity of Christ painted by Simon de Paepe in 1666 for the altar of Our Lady

== Bibliography ==
- Afdeling Ruimtelijke Ordening, Huisvesting en Monumenten Oost-Vlaanderen, cel Monumenten en Landschappen, archief.
- Stadsarchief Oudenaarde, Modern archief, EN. 861.3-79,81-84.
- BEAUCARNE E., Notice historique sur la commune d'Eename, II, Gent, 1895, p. 502.
- BERINGS G., Archivalische gegevens betreffende de bouwgeschiedenis van de Sint-Laurentiuskerk van Ename voor de restauratie van 1908-1909, onuitgegeven voorlopige tekst van 1994.
- BROWAEYS S., De Sint-Laurentiuskerk van Ename, onuitgegeven eindwerk Hoger Architectuurinstituut Sint-Lucas, Gent, 1989-1990.
- CALLEBAUT D., De Sint-Laurentiuskerk van Ename (stad Oudenaarde, prov. Oost-Vlaanderen): een vroeg-11de-eeuws symbool van stabilitas regni en fidelitas imperatoris, in Archeologie in Vlaanderen, II, 1992, p. 435-470.
- CALLEBAUT D., De Sint-Laurentiuskerk van Ename: een bouwhistorische verrassing, Monumenten en landschappen in Oudenaarde (5), Oudenaarde, 1993, p. 76-83.
- CALLEBAUT D. - VAN ACKER A., Ename Sint-Laurentiuskerk, standaardformulier voor het aanvragen van steun voor een modelproject met het oog op de instandhouding van het Europees architectonisch erfgoed, 1995.
- DEVLIEGHER L., Enkele nota's over de St.-Laurentiuskerk, in Bulletijn van de Koninklijke Commissie voor Monumenten en Landschappen, XVIII, 1969, p. 83-90.
- DEVOS P., De Sint-Laurentiuskerk van Ename, een moeilijk probleem, Open Monumentendag te Oudenaarde 10 September 1989, Oudenaarde, 1989, p. 46-48.
- DEVOS P., De Sint-Laurentiuskerk van Ename, Monumenten en landschappen in Oudenaarde (6), Oudenaarde, 1994, p. 82-88.
- DE VOS T. - SCHELSTRAETE L. - VANDERHAEGHEN A. - MERCHIE W. - DELOBELLE H., 100 jaar Katholiek Basis Onderwijs Ename, Oudenaarde, 1989, p. 15-16.
- I. A. P., niet gepubliceerde gegevens.
- VAN DEN ABEELE - BELLON R., Een greep uit Oostvlaamse landelijke kerken. De St.-Laurentiuskerk te Ename, in Toerisme in Oost-Vlaanderen, XXII, 5, 1973, p. 84-88.
- VAN DEN BOSSCHE H., De Sint-Laurentiuskerk te Ename, in Monumenten en Landschappen, XI, 6, 1992, Binnenkrant, p. 2-4.
- VANDENBUSSCHE-VAN DEN KERKHOVE C., Fotorepertorium van het meubilair van de Belgische bedehuizen, Provincie Oost-Vlaanderen, Kanton Oudenaarde, Brussel, 1978, p. 38-40.
- VAN DIJCK L., Ename, Sint-Laurentiuskerk. Restauratie van muurschilderingen in het boogveld boven een dichtgemetste arcade op de oostelijke muur van het middenschip. Verslag, onuitgegeven tekst, 1995.
- VAN DIJCK L., Ename: (Oudenaarde), St.-Laurentiuskerk. Westkoor: onderzoek naar afwerkingslagen en plaatsing van de gegevens in de relatieve chronologie van het gebouw. Tussentijds verslag: werk in uitvoering, onuitgegeven tekst, 1995.
- VAN DIJCK L., Graffiti, onuitgegeven tekst, 1995.
- VAN DIJCK L., Ename, St.-Laurentiuskerk, muurdecoratie, onuitgegeven tekst, 1995.
