= St. Lawrence's Church, Bocholt =

Coordinates: 51.17229°N 5.57865°E

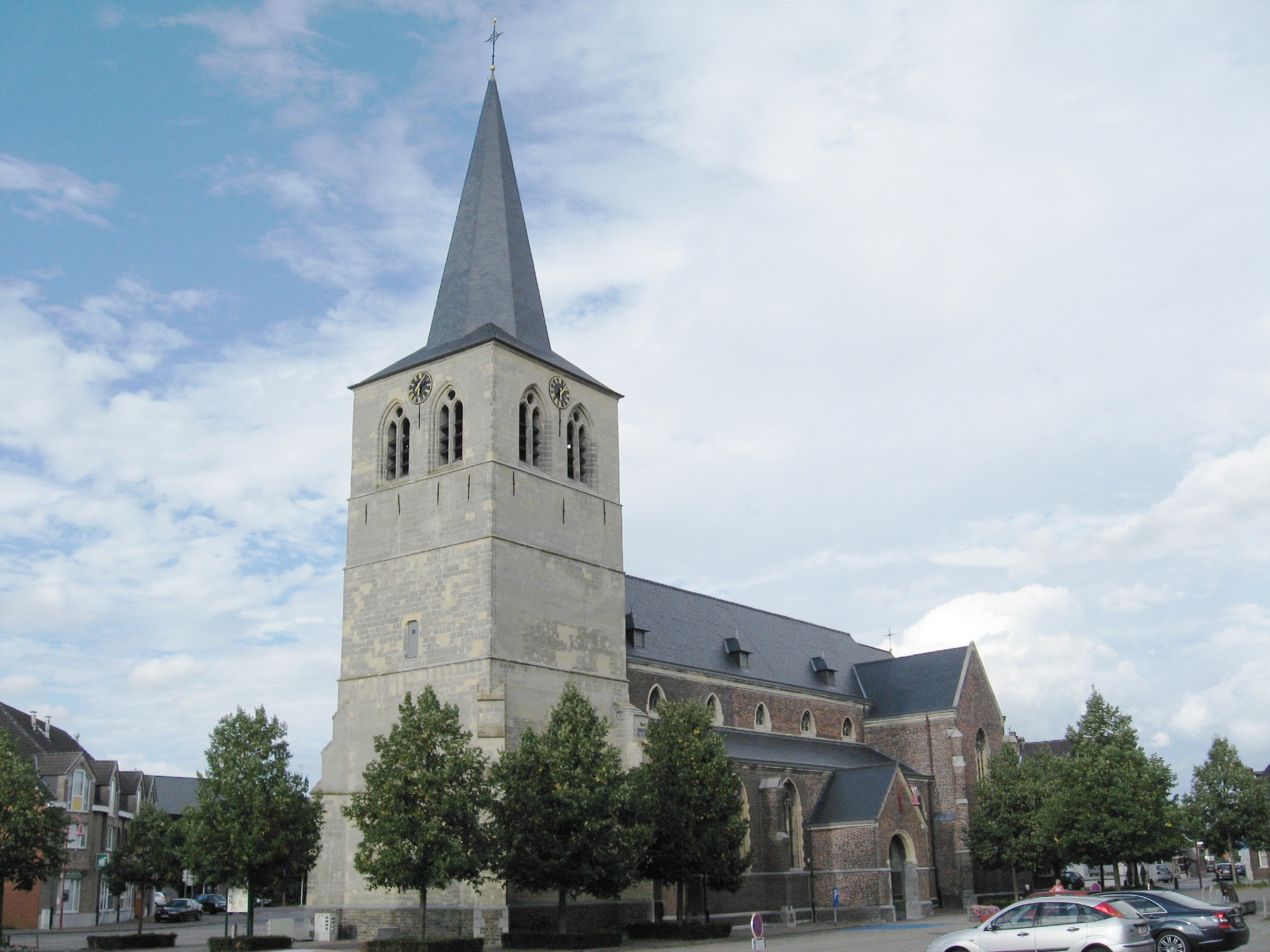
St. Lawrence's Church

St. Lawrence's Church (Dutch: Sint-Laurenskerk or Sint-Laurentiuskerk) is the parish church of Bocholt, Belgium, dedicated to Saint Lawrence.

== Historys ==
The church is built on the spot of an earlier Roman church that was destroyed in 1360, when the Prince-Bishopric of Liège fought with the County of Loon. The Jus patronatus was in the hands of the powerful Herkenrode Abbey. Construction of the church was begun in the 14th century, and the tower, which is built in marl stone, was completed in 1411. The nave was completed in 1476. In 1585 the church was plundered by the troops of Willem the Silent, and the roof and top of the tower were severely damaged in a storm in 1608. Repairs were not completed before 1720.

In 1910 the church was expanded with two bays, and to achieve this the tower was moved approximately 10 meters under the direction of the German-American engineer of Budapest, Henry Weiss. On 13 September 1944 the church burned during the retreat of the German occupying forces, and many treasures were lost. The church was rebuilt in 1950 under the direction of the architect Van den Dael.

Today, the Sint-Laurentiuskerk is late Gothic with a neo-Gothic main altar with a retable dating from around 1500, depicting six scenes from the Life of Mary. The shutters depict scenes from the life of Saint Laurence. The church contains a church tabernacle from the second half of the 16th century, and two confessionals in baroque style. The church also has nine sculptures of saints and a 3 meter high statue of Saint Christopher.
