= Jean Del Cour =

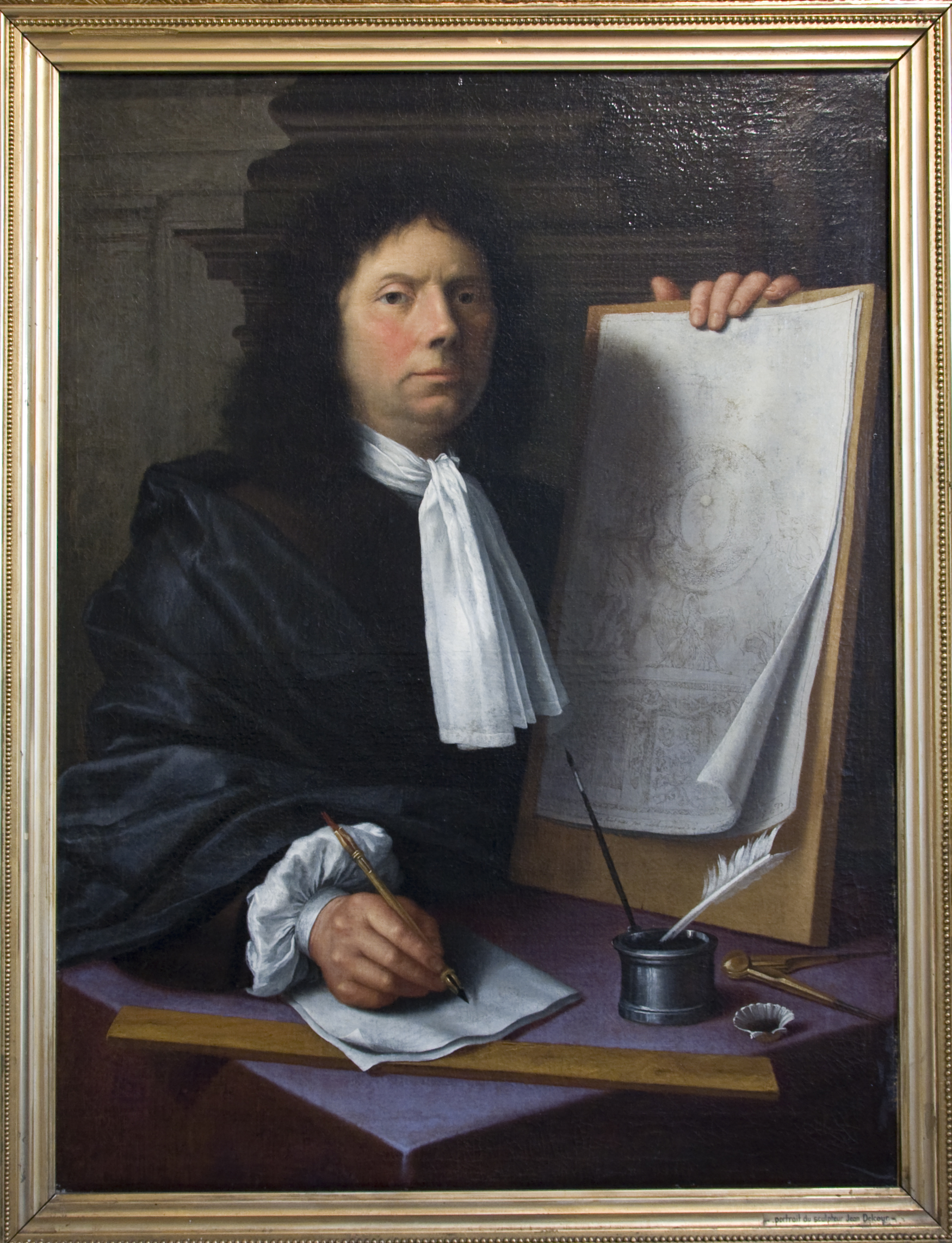
Jean Del Cour, with his plan for an altar at Herkenrode abbey, painted by his brother Jean-Gilles Delcour.

Jean Delcour, or Del Cour (1627, in Hamoir – 1707), was a Baroque sculptor from Liège, in present-day Belgium.

== Biography ==
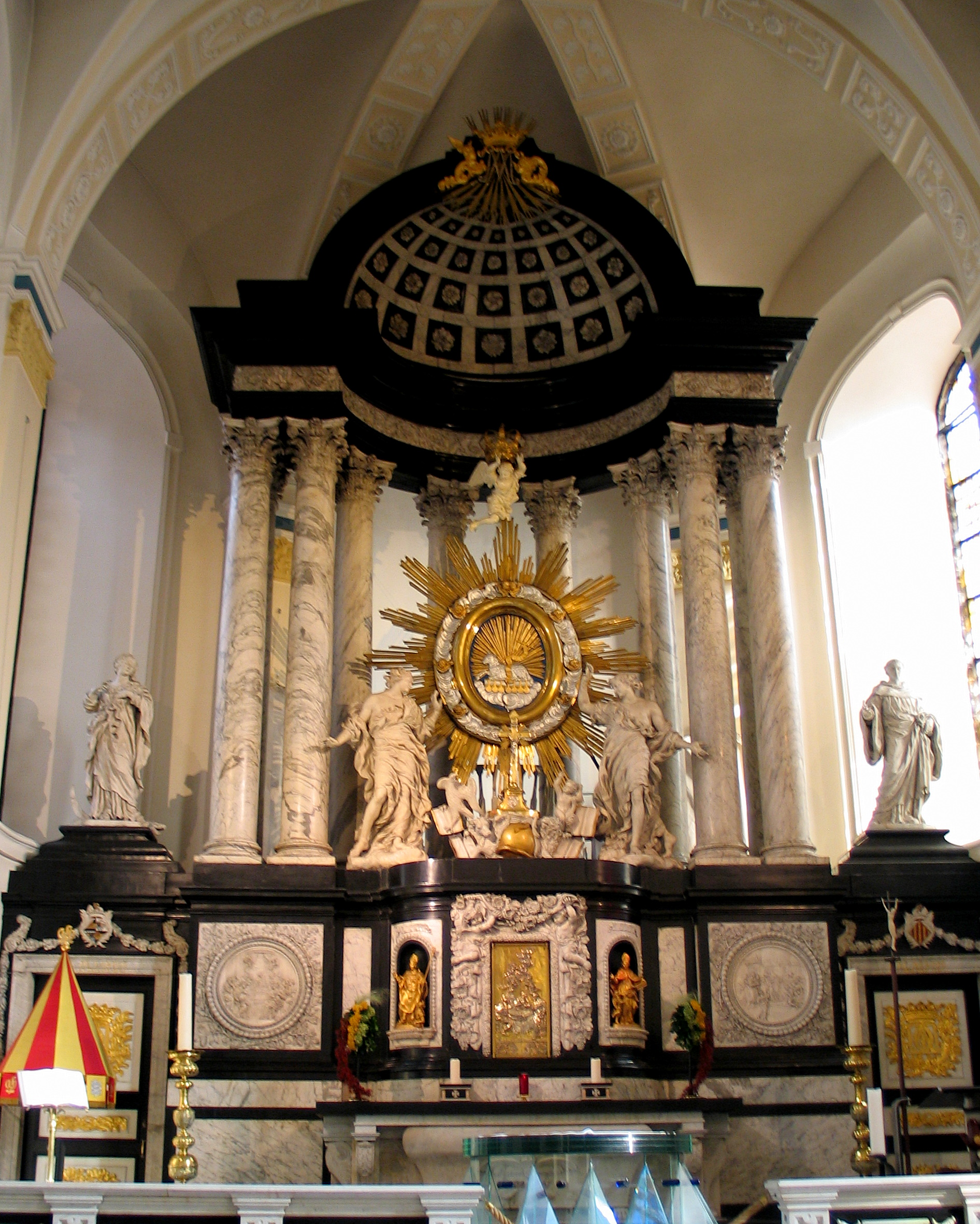
Altar in the Virga Jesse Basilica.

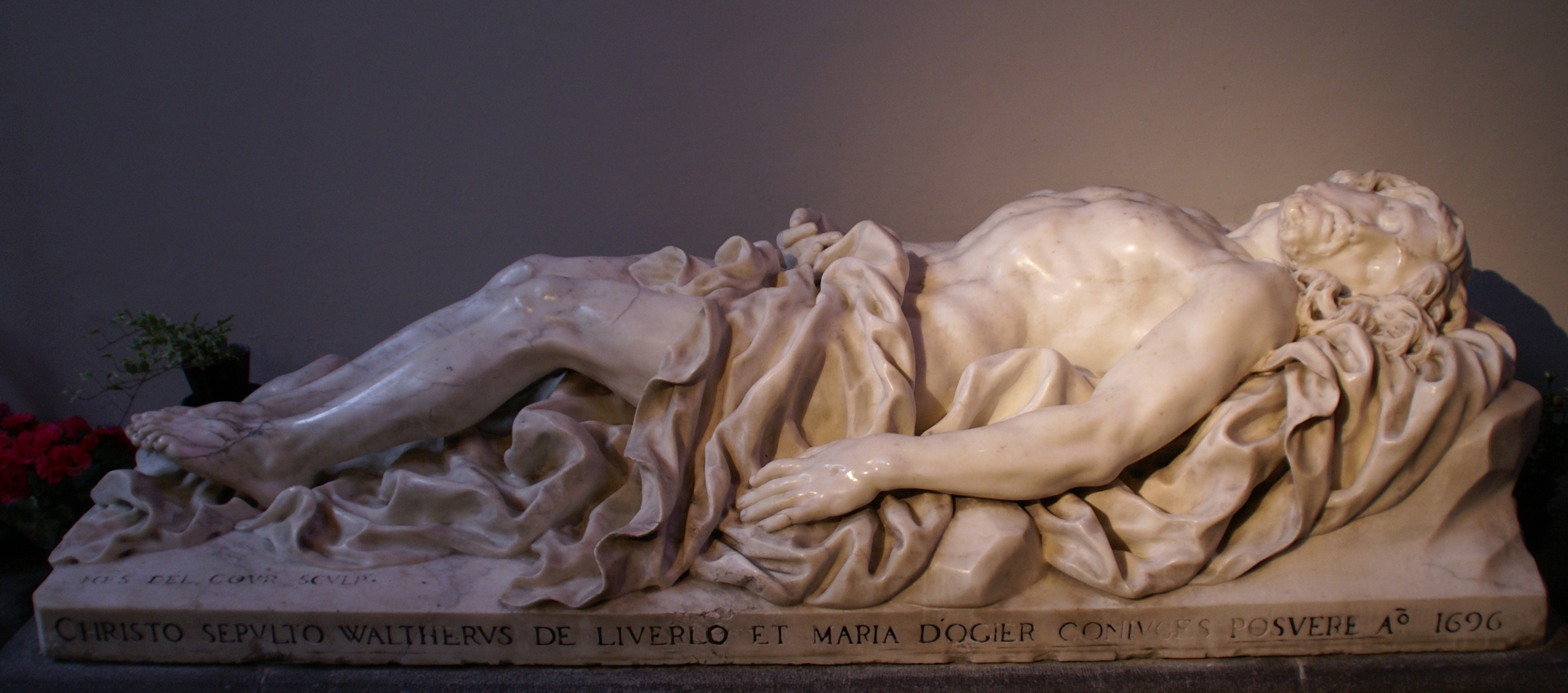
Reclining Christ, 1696, Sint-Pauluskathedraal, Liege.

At the age of 15 he became a sculpture pupil in Liege of the monk Arnold Henrard. After this training he traveled to Rome and became a pupil of Gian Lorenzo Bernini. He was also influenced by Ercole Ferrata. In 1661 he returned to Liege where he started a workshop on the street Soeurs-de-Hasques. He sculpted wood, marble, and ivory for the wealthy leaders of the Prince-Bishopric of Liège.

An altar from his hand in Cararra marble is now in the Virga Jesse Basilica that was originally commissioned for Herkenrode Abbey by the abbess there, Anna Catharina de Lamboy. He also made the mausoleum van Allamont in the Saint Bavo Cathedral in Ghent.

His only pupil, Jean Hans, never left his service and stayed with him until he died.

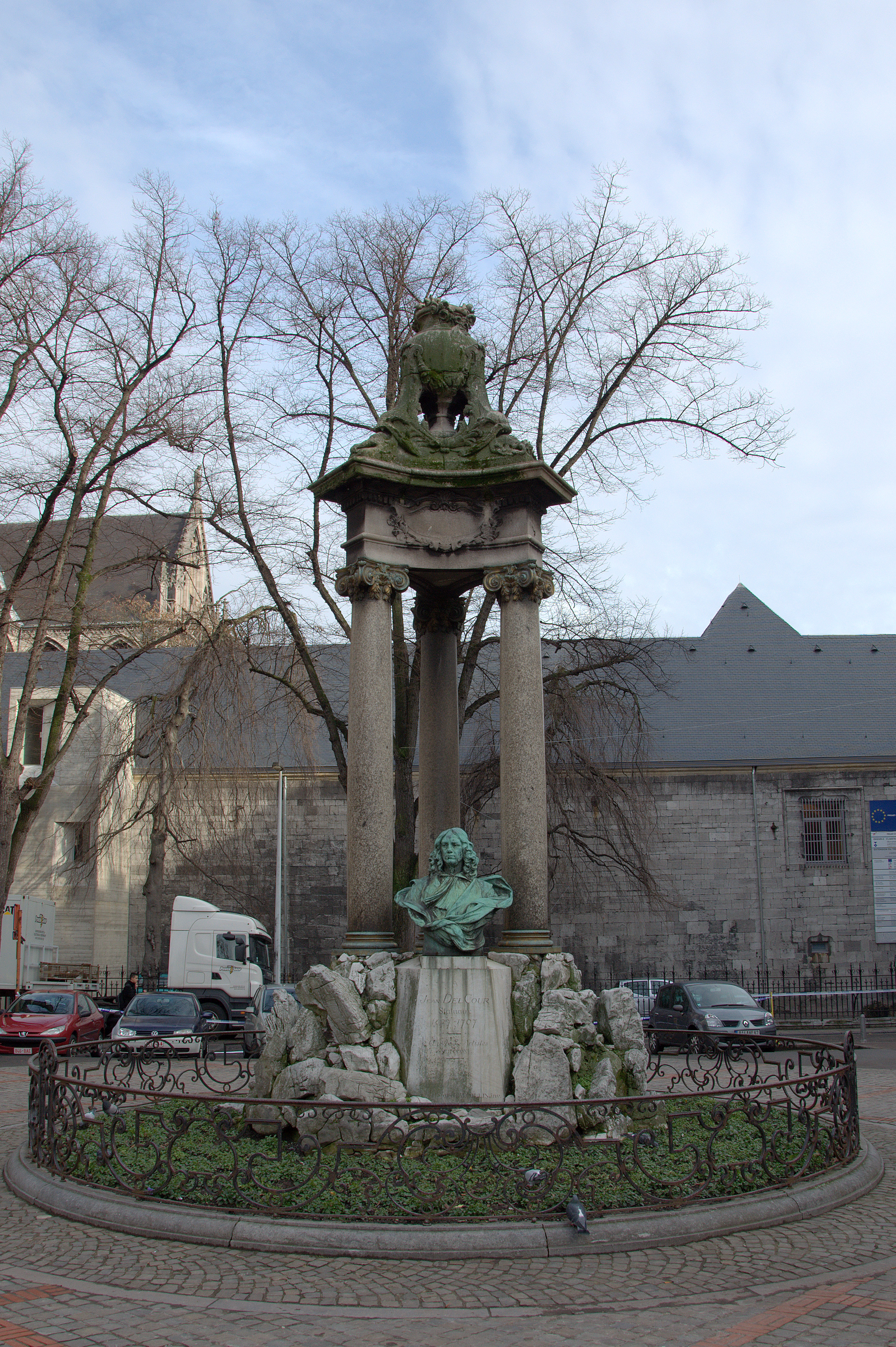
Monument to Del Cour on Place Saint-Paul, Liege

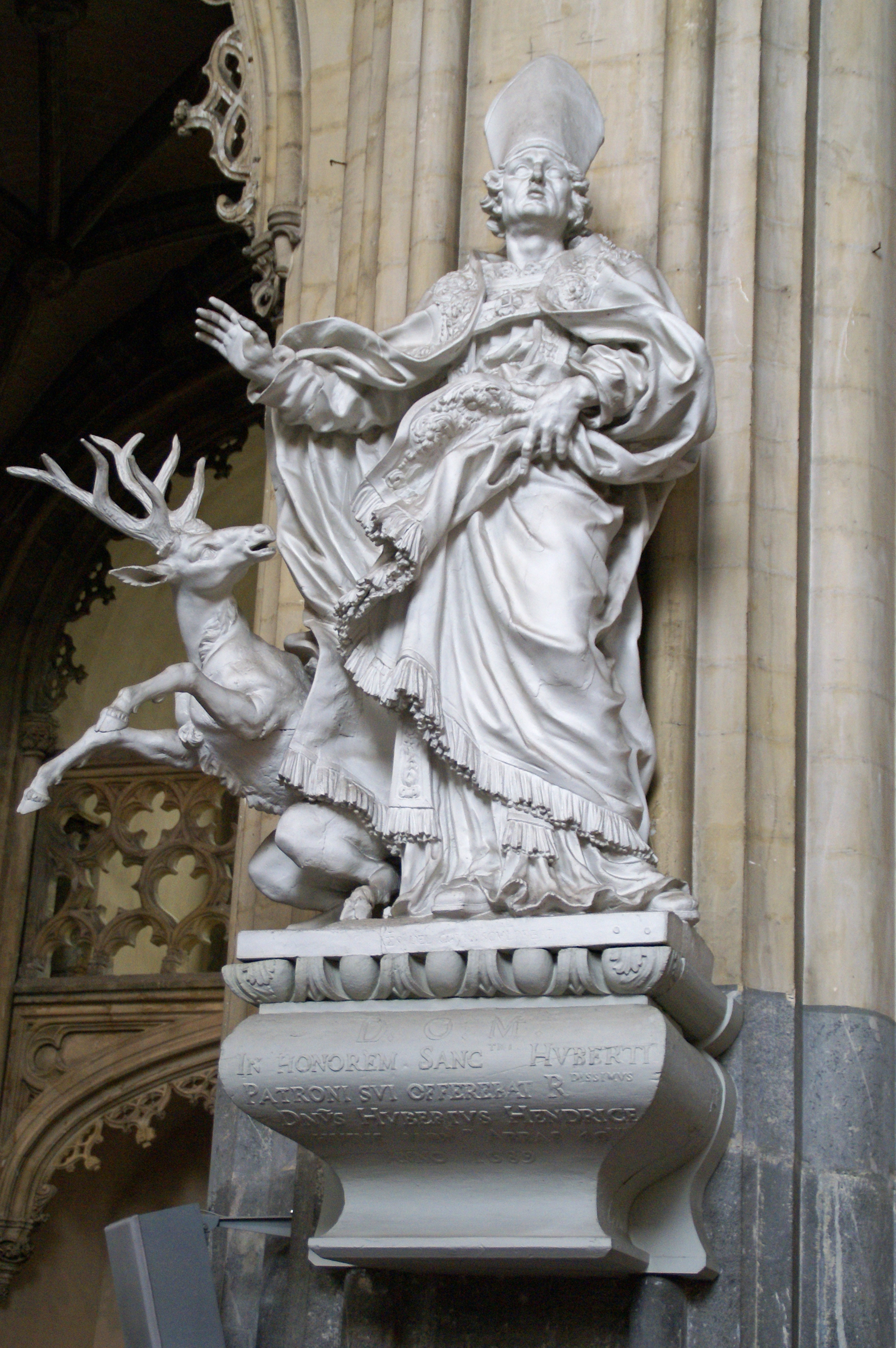
St Hubertus sculpture, 1689, Sint-Jacobskerk, Liege

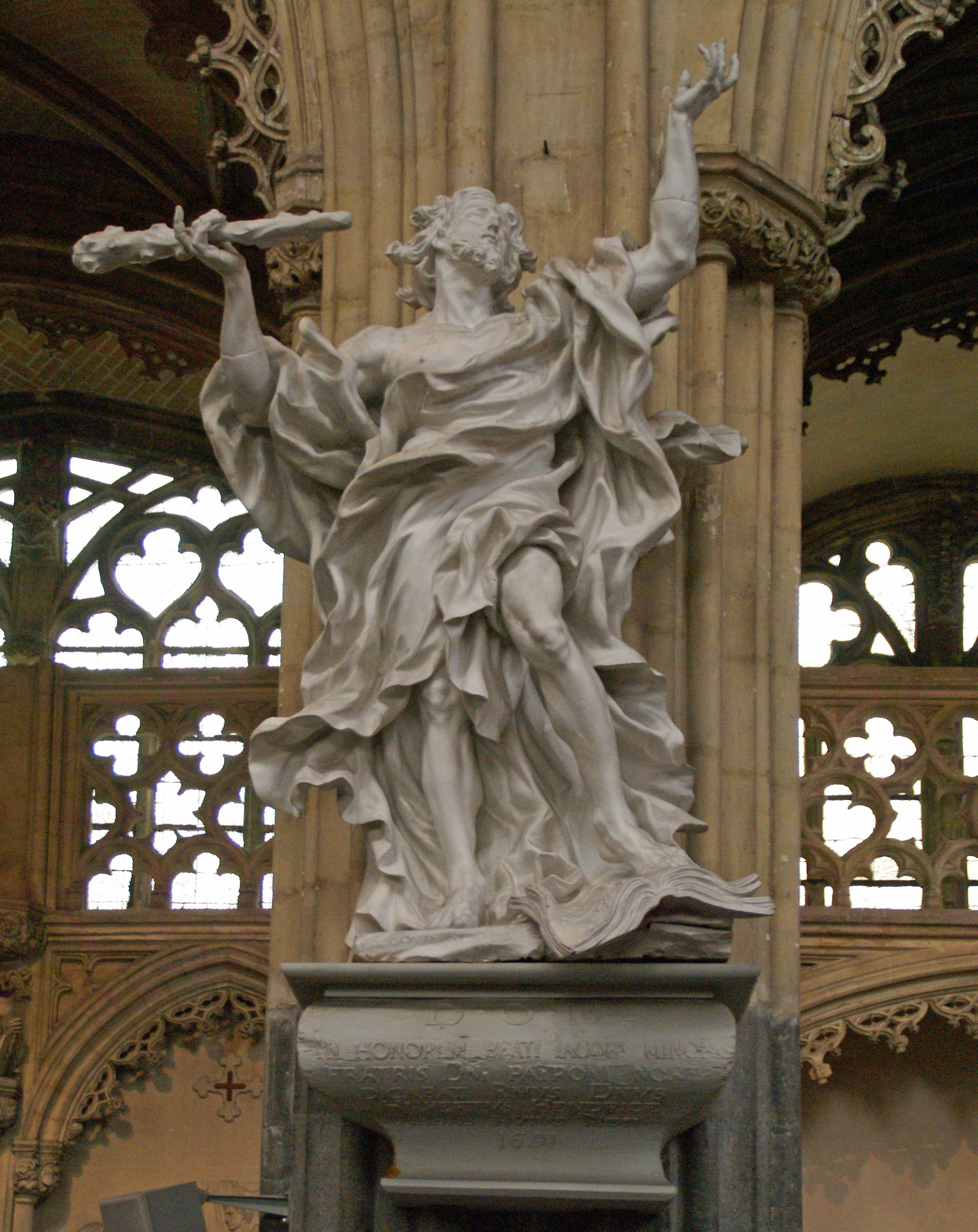
St James sculpture, 1691, Sint-Jacobskerk, Liege

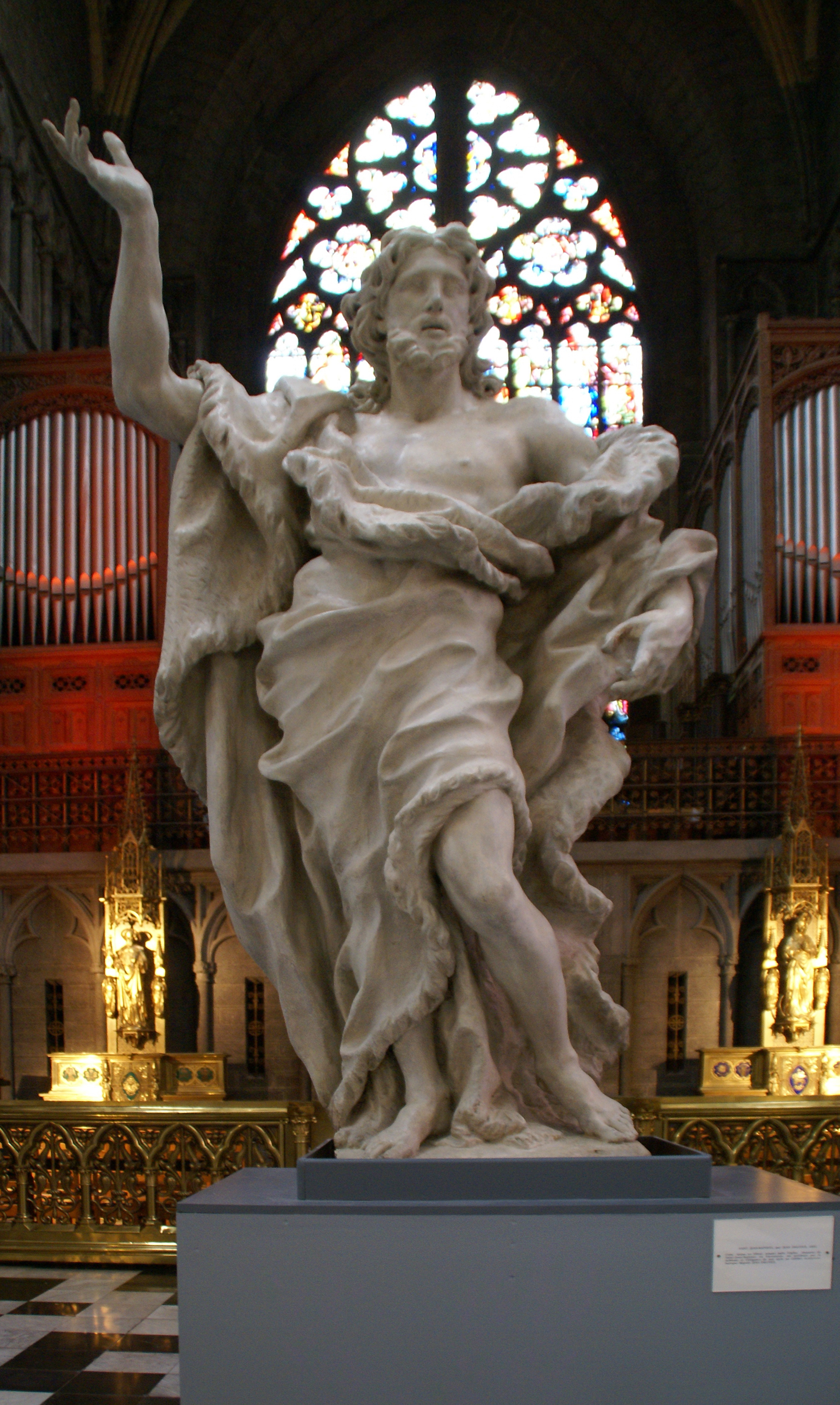
John the Baptist, 1682, Sint-Pauluskathedraal, Liege
