= Jean-Gilles Delcour =

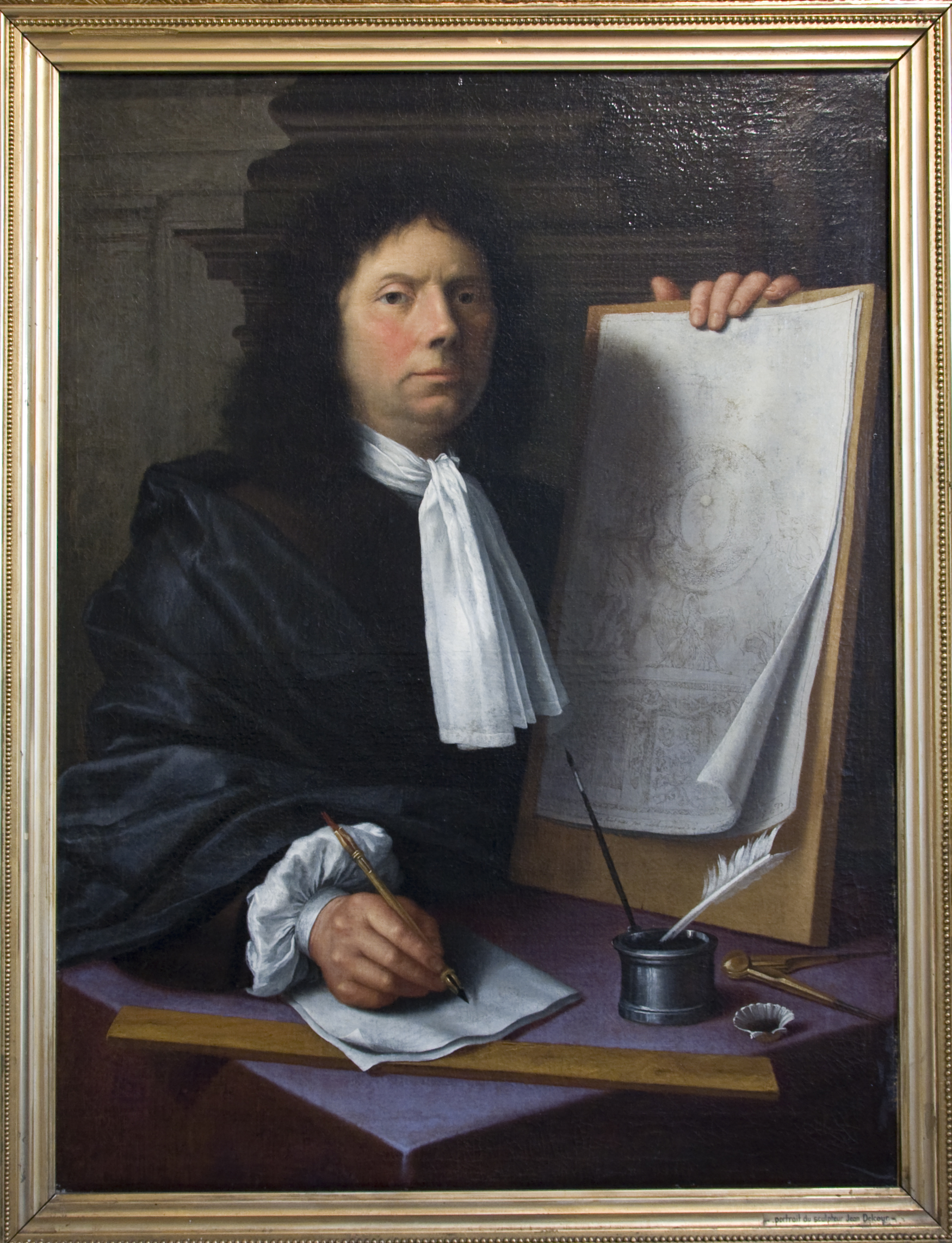
Portrait of his brother, the sculptor Jean Del Cour, now in the Curtius Museum in Liège

Jean-Gilles Delcour (1632–1695), is a walloon painter of religious subjects, was born at Hamoir, near Liège. He was a scholar of Geraert Douffet, but went to Rome and there studied for a long time under Andrea Sacchi and Carlo Maratti. He made excellent copies of some of Raphael's most celebrated works, which still exist at Liège, where there are also some original pictures by him in the churches. He died at Liège in 1695.
