= Virga Jesse Basilica =

- Virga Jessebasiliek
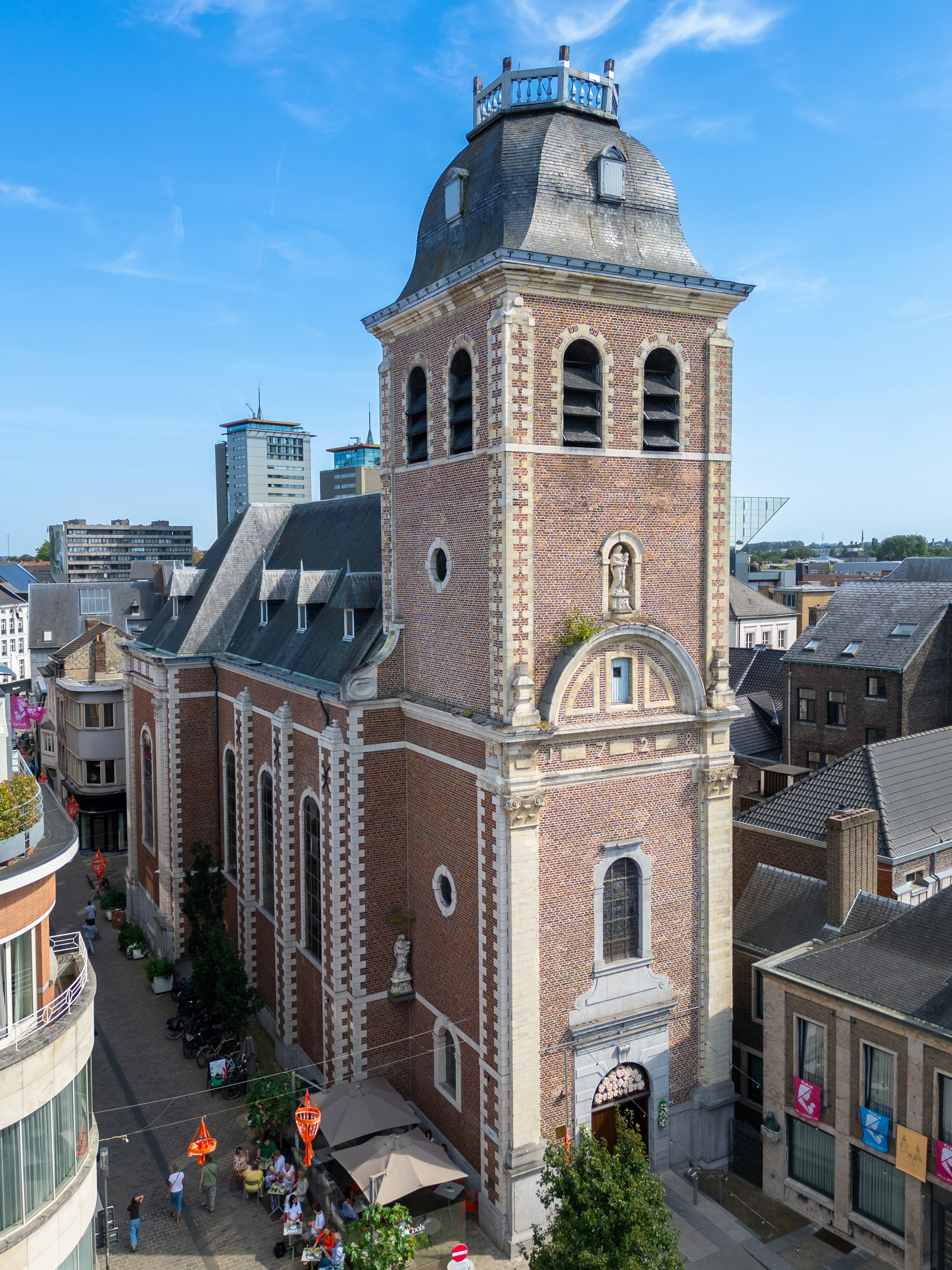
- Virga Jesse Basilica in Hasselt
- Virga Jesse Basilica
- Location: Hasselt, Belgium

History
- Dedication: Virga Jesse

Architecture
- Style: Late Baroque and early Classicism
- Completed: 1727

Specifications
- Materials: Stone

The Virga Jesse Basilica (Dutch: Virga Jessebasiliek) is a basilica located on Kapelstraat in Hasselt, Belgium. The church is best known for housing the 14th-century statue of the Virga Jesse, which is paraded through the streets of Hasselt every seven years during the Seven-Yearly Festivities.

The church, formerly known as Onze-Lieve-Vrouwekerk, was first established in 1334 when a member of the "Brotherhood of Our Lady" built the Clerkenkapel on the site. The current structure, completed in 1727, was built in a late-Baroque and early-Classical style, replacing the original chapel.

On August 15, 1867, Pope Pius IX authorized the coronation of the Virga Jesse statue by François-Xavier de Mérode. The church was heavily damaged by a V-1 rocket bombing in November 1944, which killed 16 people and destroyed much of the surrounding area. The Virga Jesse statue miraculously survived the devastation. The church was rebuilt and reopened in 1951.

On May 6, 1998, Pope John Paul II elevated the church to the status of a basilica. The basilica received the traditional insignia of a basilica, including a conopeum (papal umbrella) and a tintinnabulum (bell). It has been a protected monument since 1980.

== Removal of the Bell Tower in 2023 ==
A routine inspection in 2017, Monumentenwacht, failed to discover severe structural problems, including wood rot in the upper part of the bell tower. Those problems were later discovered after displacement of a column was seen by neighbors. For safety reasons, the upper section, including the spire and the bells, was removed in late 2023. Though plans were considered for restoration, the tower remains incomplete.

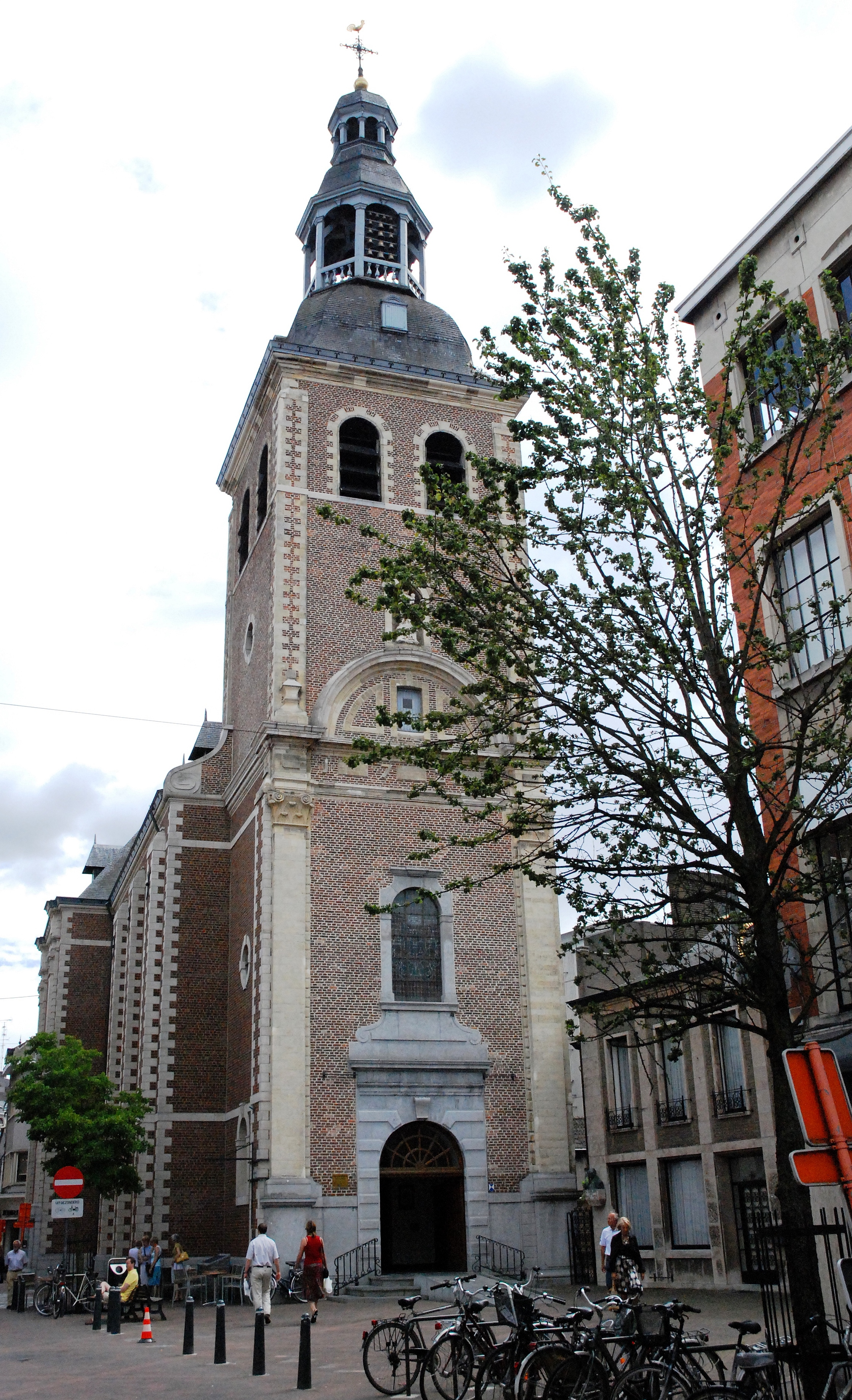
Virga Jesse Basilica with original spire

== Artistic Treasures ==
The basilica houses numerous artistic and religious treasures:

- The Virga Jesse statue, a 14th-century Gothic oak carving, which survived the Iconoclasm and the 1944 bombing.
- Baroque altar crafted by Jean Del Cour (1631–1707), originally from the Herkenrode Abbey.
- Marble tombs of abbesses Anna Catharina de Lamboy and Barbara de Rivière d'Arschot, by Artus Quellinus the Younger and Laurent Delvaux.
- The confessional used by Valentinus Paquay, known as the "Holy Father of Hasselt".

Some of the basilica's treasures, including mantles and jewels for the Virga Jesse statue, are displayed at Het Stadsmus. Notable items include the silver ‘kleedje van de Morin,’ recognized as a Flemish heritage piece.

== Organ ==
The organ, built around 1860 by Arnold Clerinx, was moved to the basilica in 1952 from the Saint Elisabeth Hall in Antwerp. It was restored in 2003.

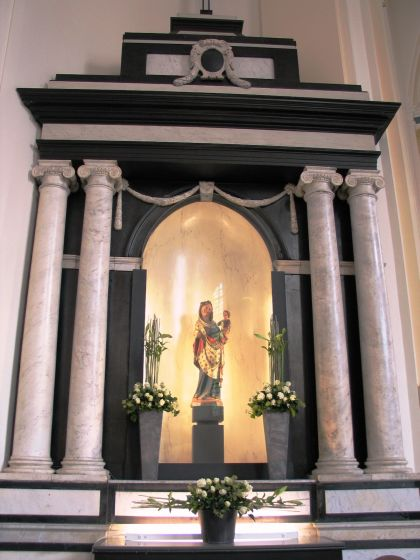
Virga Jesse statue

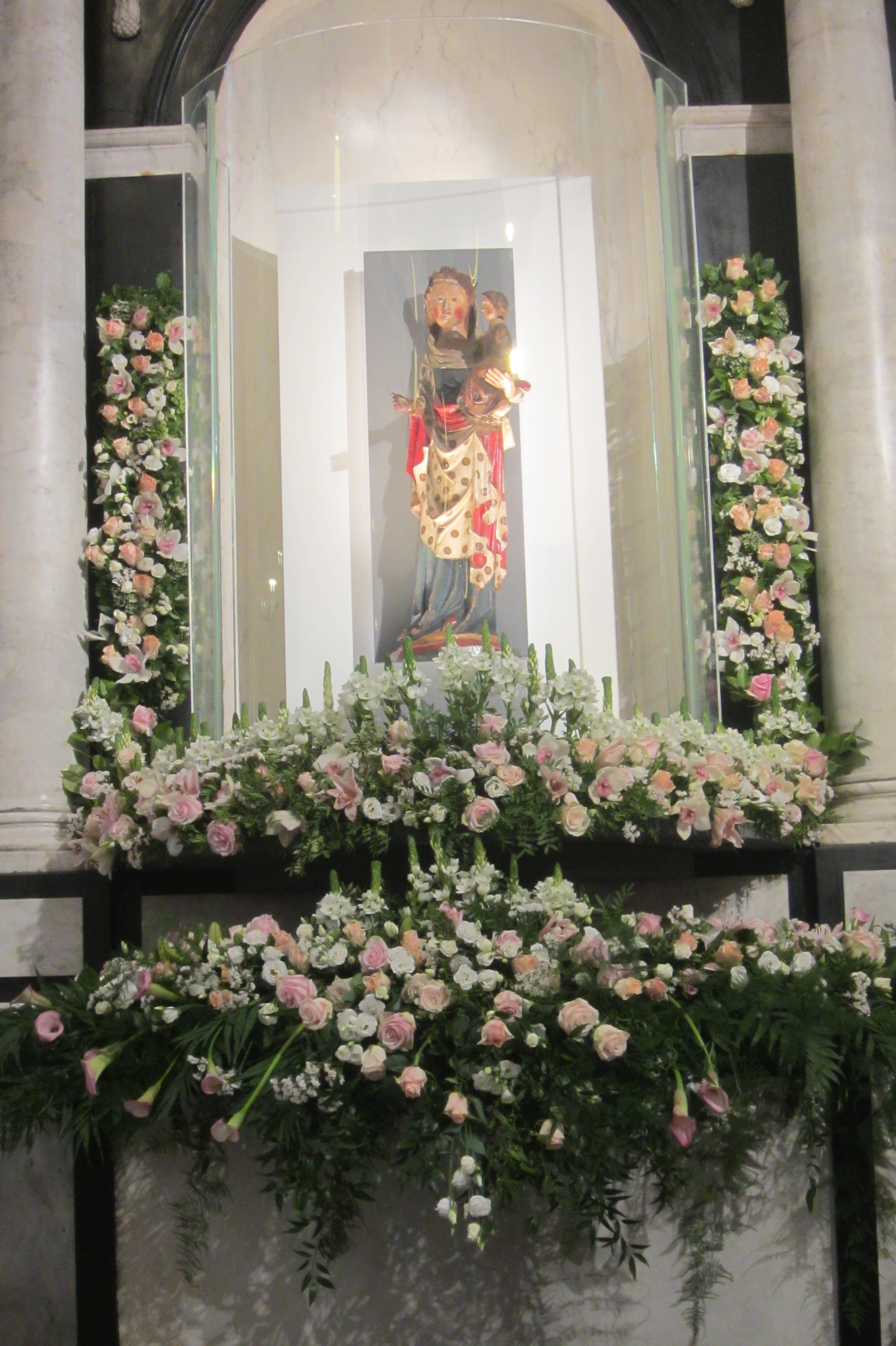
Virga Jesse during the Seven-Yearly Festivities, 2017

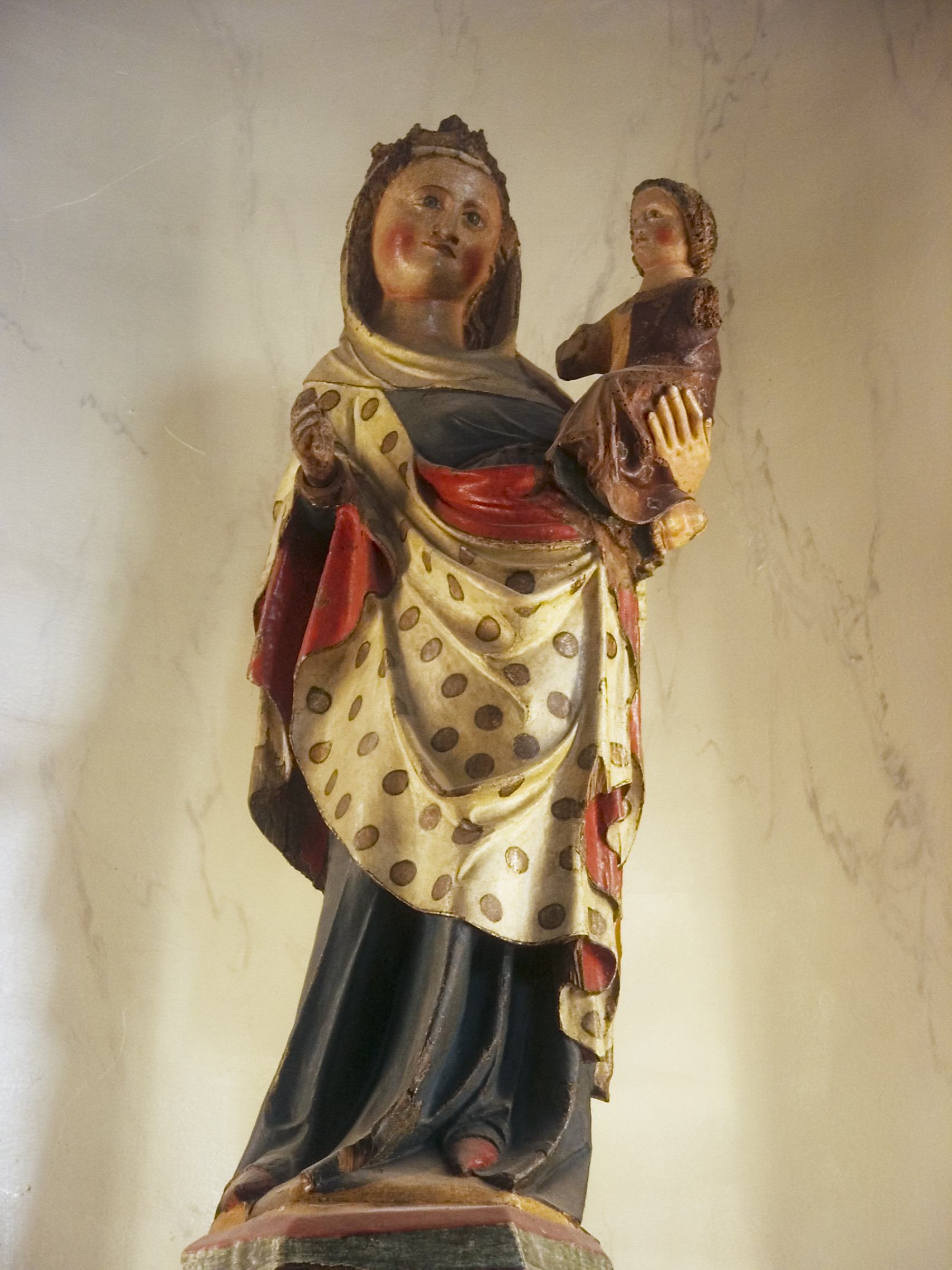
Virga Jesse statue

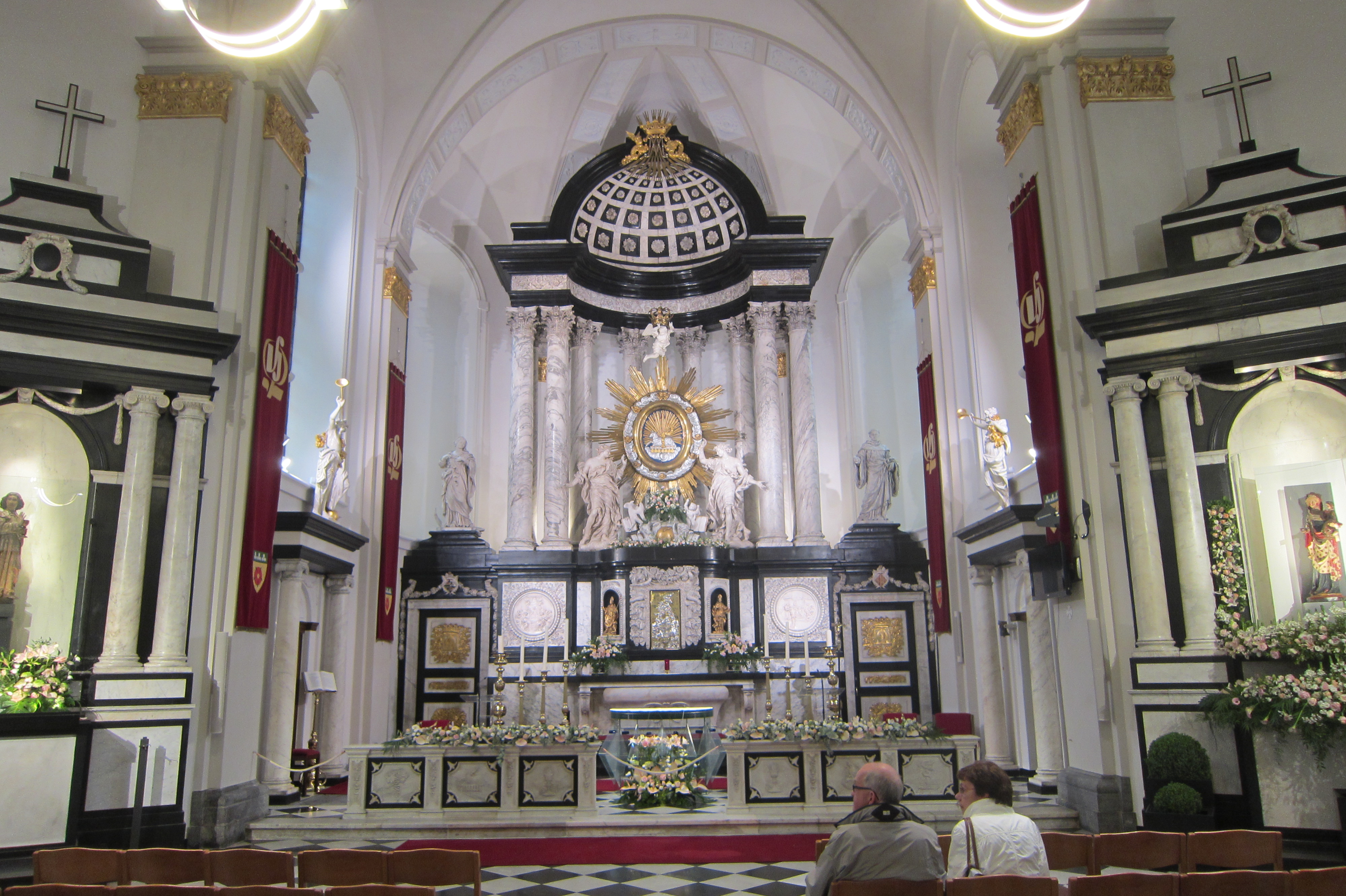
Choir of the Virga Jesse Basilica, 2017

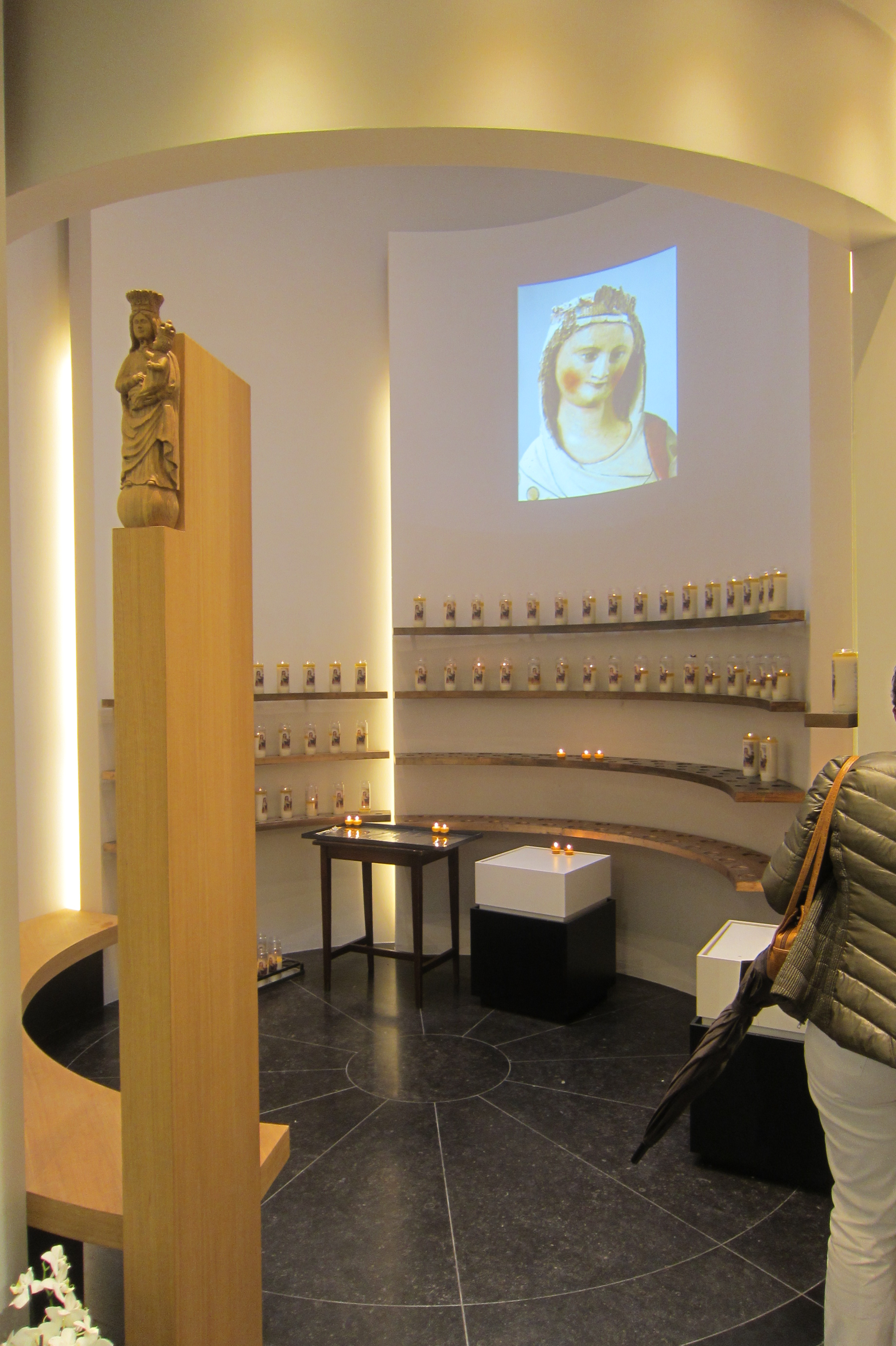
Virga Jesse Chapel, 2017

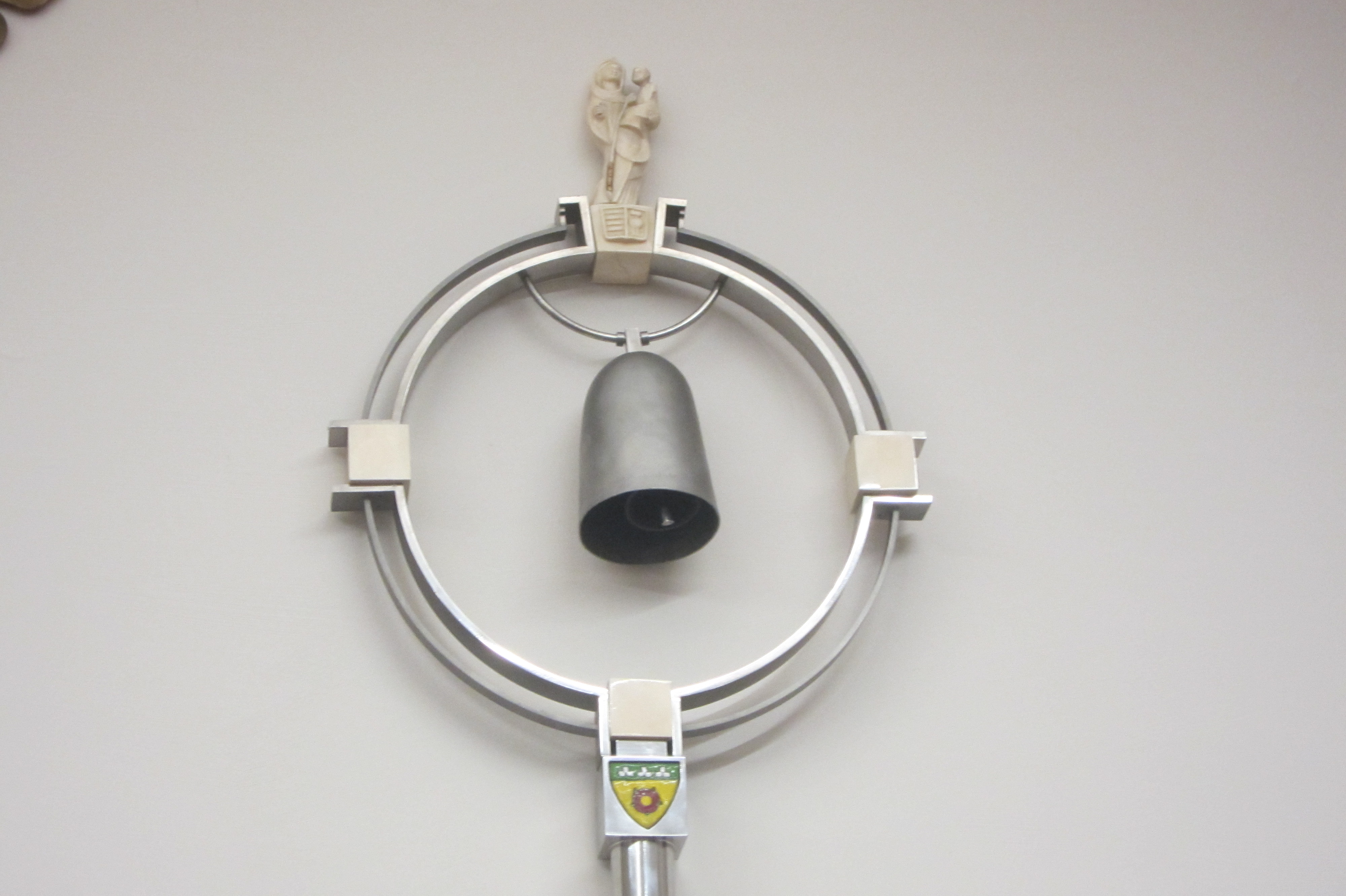
Tintinnabulum of the Virga Jesse Basilica

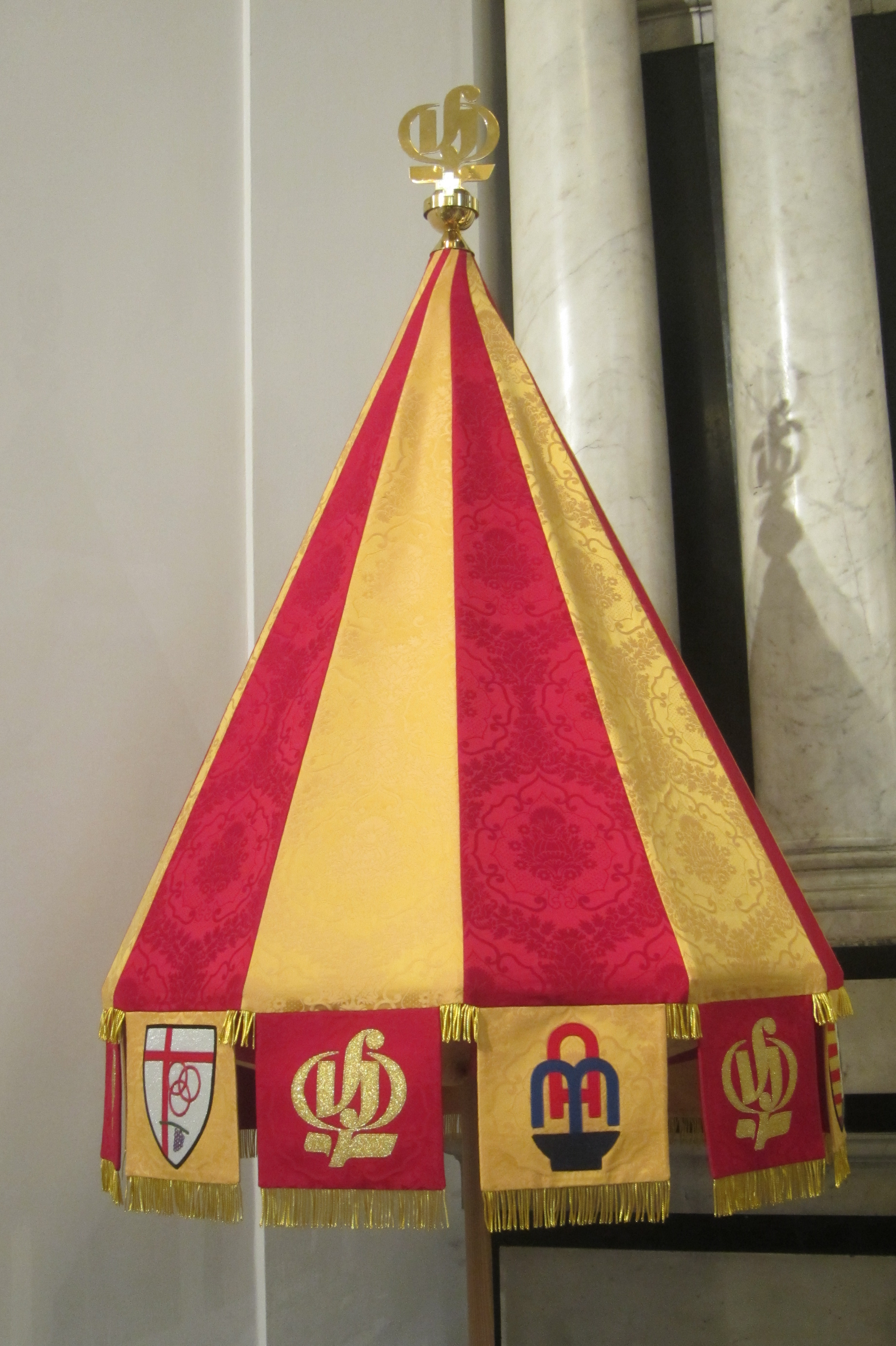
Conopeum of the Virga Jesse Basilica

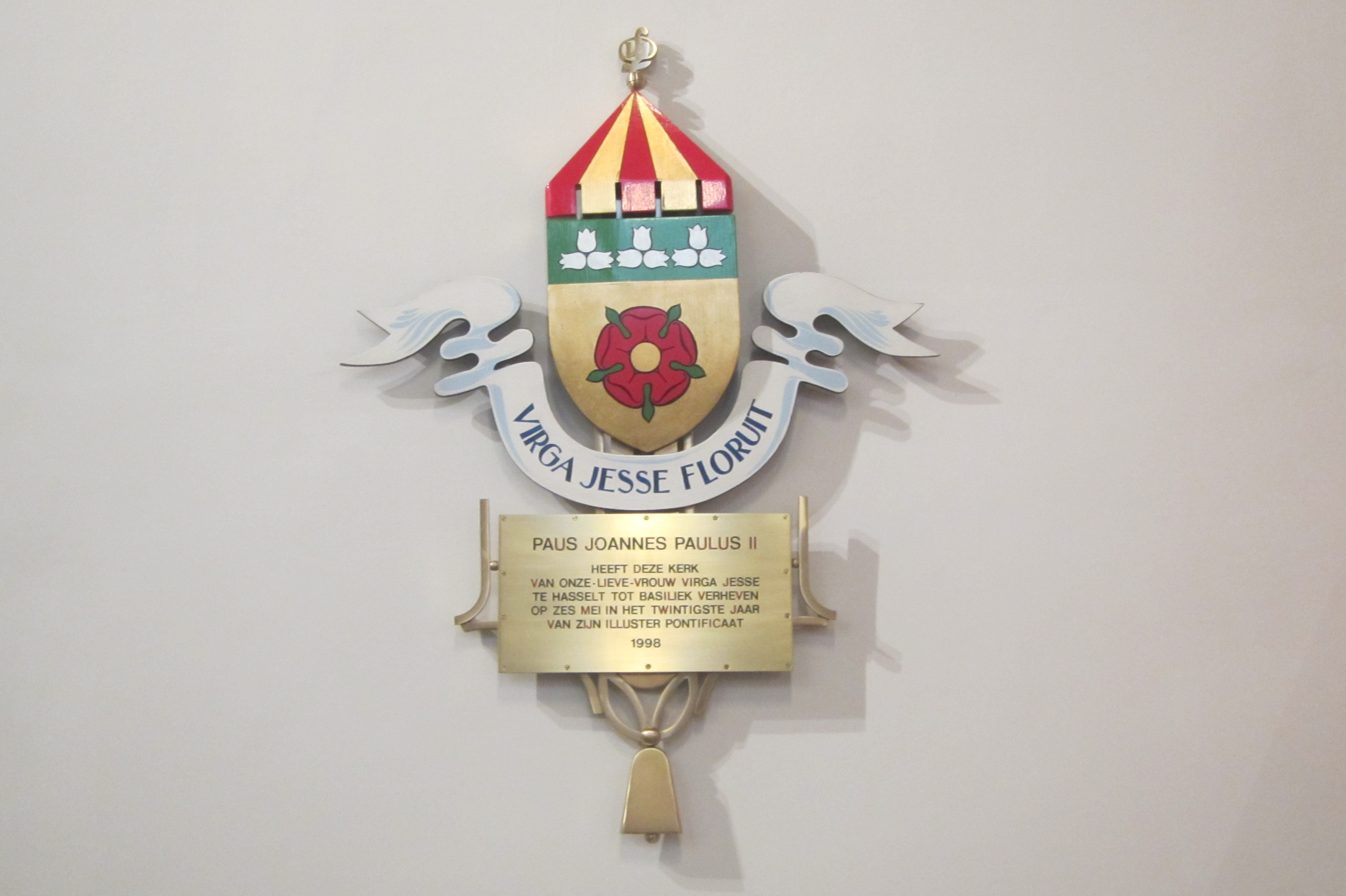
Elevation of the Virga Jesse Church to a basilica in 1998 by Pope John Paul II
