= Gilbert d'Oignies =

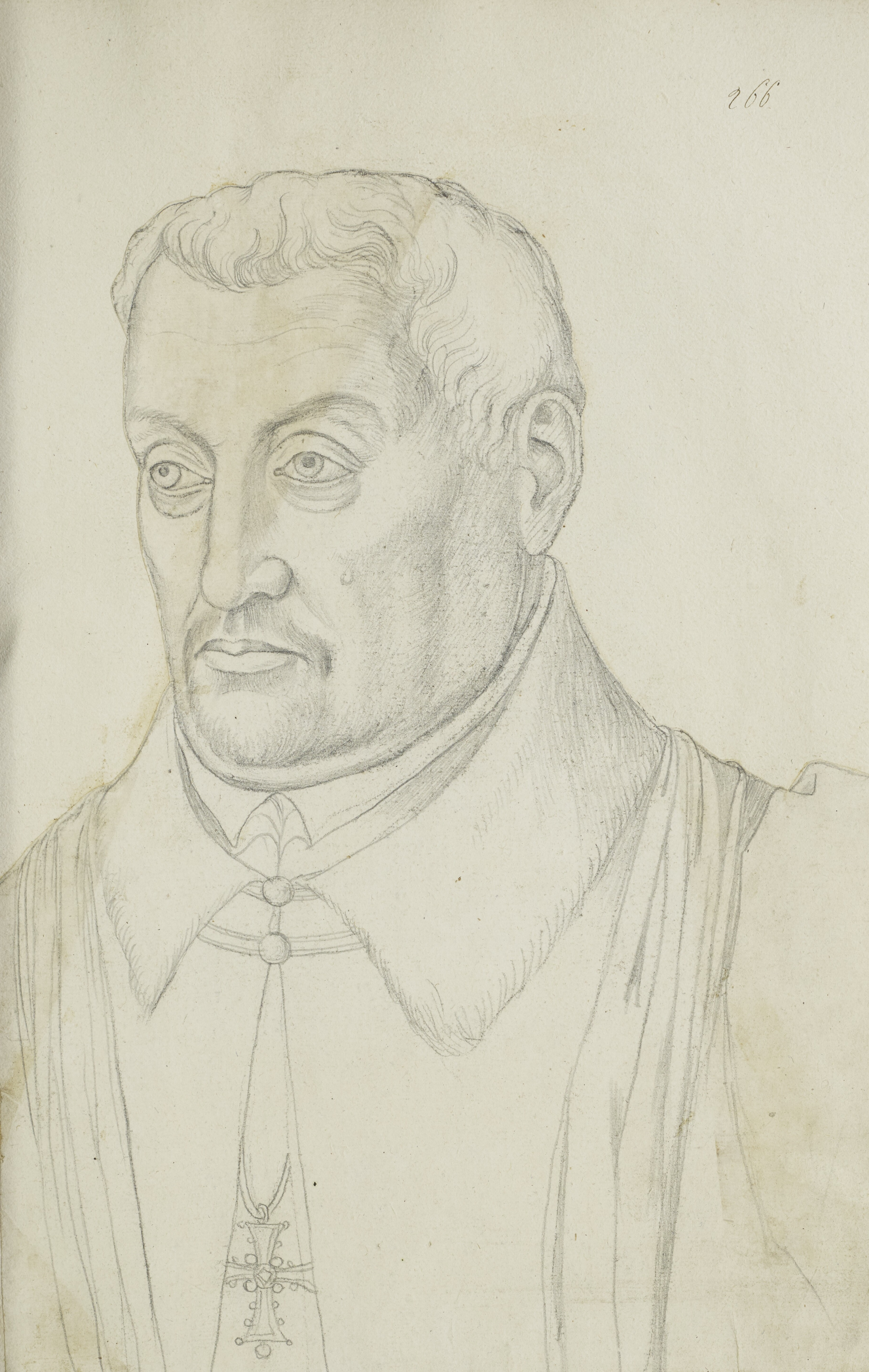
- Church: Catholic
- Diocese: Tournai
- See: Notre-Dame de Tournai
- Predecessor: Charles de Croÿ
- Successor: Pierre Pintaflour

Orders
- Consecration: 21 October 1565

Personal details
- Born: c. 1520 Lille, Walloon Flanders, or Tournai, Tournaisis, Habsburg Netherlands
- Died: 25 August 1574 Kortrijk, County of Flanders, Habsburg Netherlands
- Buried: Tournai Cathedral
- Motto: Quae sursum sunt

Gilbert d'Oignies (ca. 1520–1574) was a bishop of Tournai in the Habsburg Netherlands.

== Life ==
Gilbert was born in Lille or Tournai around 1520, the son of Jean d'Oignies and Marguerite de Launir. He was appointed to a canonry of Tournai Cathedral and became vicar general to Charles de Croÿ, in succession to whom he was appointed bishop of Tournai. He received episcopal consecration on 21 October 1565 in the church of Saint-Amand Abbey.

At the outbreak of the Iconoclastic Fury, particularly overwhelming in the Tournaisis, d'Oignies sought refuge in Lille, only returning to his see in January 1567. He established a second archdeacon in Tournai, so that the French-speaking and Dutch-speaking parts of his diocese would be separate archdeaconries, with the deaneries of Tournai, Lille and Seclin in one and those of Kortrijk and Helkijn in the other. On 25 August 1574 he died of plague while on a visit to Kortrijk. His body was returned to Tournai for burial.

Catholic Church titles
Preceded by Charles de Croÿ	Bishop of Tournai; 1565–1574	Succeeded by Pierre Pintaflour
