= Pierre Pintaflour =

European humanist (1502-1580)

- Church: Catholic
- Diocese: Tournai
- See: Notre-Dame de Tournai
- Installed: 15 June 1575
- Predecessor: Gilbert d'Oignies
- Successor: Maximilien Morillon

Orders
- Consecration: 31 July 1575

Personal details
- Born: 1502 Strazeele, County of Flanders, Habsburg Netherlands
- Died: 10 April 1580 (aged 77–78) Tournai, Tournaisis, Habsburg Netherlands
- Buried: Tournai Cathedral
- Occupation: Lawyer
- Education: University of Leuven

Pierre Pintaflour (1502–1580) was a humanist from the Habsburg Netherlands, writing under the pen name Thindari, who became bishop of Tournai.

== Life ==
Pintaflour was born in Strazeele (castellany of Cassel) in 1502, the second son of Mathias Pintaflore and Isabeau Marasse. His grandfather had been a Sicilian mercenary in Burgundian service. He died in Tournai on 10 April 1580. He was probably educated by the Brethren of the Common Life in Bergues and then studied at Lily College, Leuven, matriculating in 1519. He graduated Master of Arts in 1524 and began to work as a tutor to wealthy students. In 1533 he became professor of philosophy at Lily College, and in 1538 graduated Licentiate of Laws. In 1539 he became professor of civil law, and on 23 January 1540 was installed as a canon of St. Peter's Church, Leuven.

Entering the service of Charles de Croÿ as a lawyer, Pintaflour resigned his university positions and moved to Brussels. He was briefly married, but as a widower he entered the clerical estate in 1550 and was appointed to the parish of Hérinnes, where in 1554 he rebuilt the presbytery. He employed a curate to minister to the parish, while he himself served as head of Charles de Croÿ's diocesan tribunal from 1554 to 1555, before being assigned to a canonry of Tournai Cathedral. In 1557 he became Dean of Tournai, and in 1565 was one of the delegates of Tournai at the provincial synod of Cambrai.

From 27 August 1566 to 3 January 1567, Tournai was dominated by iconoclast rebels. At Gilbert d'Oignies's death on 24 August 1574, Pintaflour became vicar general of the diocese of Tournai. He was later named bishop, taking possession of the see on 15 June 1575, and receiving episcopal consecration at the hands of Martin Rythovius in Kortrijk Minster on 31 July 1575. He worked with Rythovius and Remi Drieux to influence John of Austria's policy, insisting that the Pacification of Ghent was neither contrary to the teachings nor detrimental to the position of the Catholic Church. In 1578 he took an oath to support William of Orange in so far as this involved nothing contrary to the interests of the Church or the authority of the king, Philip II of Spain. Pintaflour died on 10 April 1580 and was buried on 2 May. He left bequests to fund scholarships and apprenticeships, as well as donations to the poor and to the cathedral itself.
