= Maximilien Villain =

Maximilien Villain de Gand
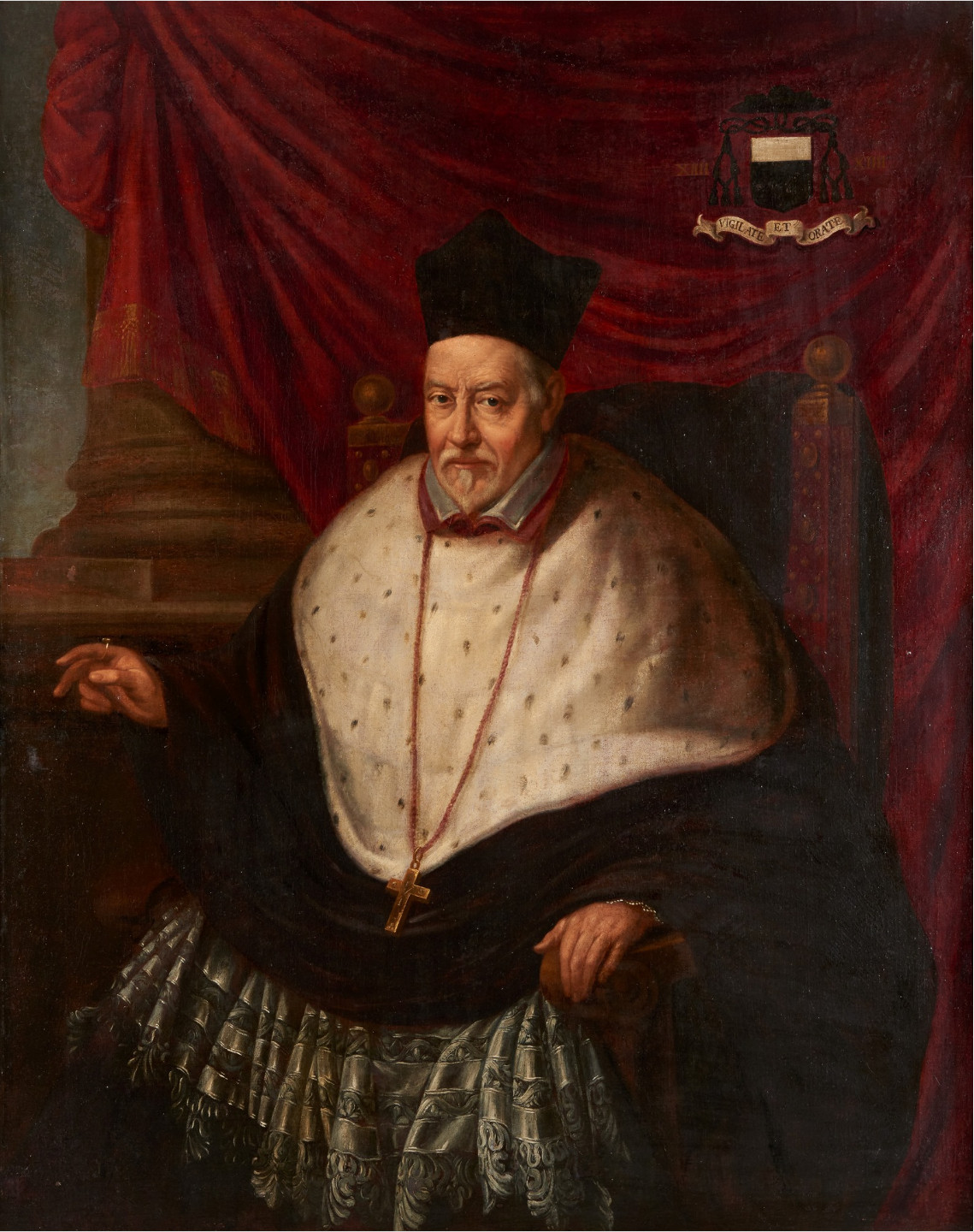
- Church: Catholic
- Diocese: Tournai
- See: Notre-Dame de Tournai
- Installed: 28 February 1616
- Term ended: 29 November 1644
- Predecessor: Michel d'Esne
- Successor: François Villain

Orders
- Ordination: 12 December 1587
- Consecration: 14 March 1616

Personal details
- Born: 1569
- Died: 1644 (aged 74–75) Tournai, Tournaisis, Habsburg Netherlands
- Buried: Tournai Cathedral

Maximilien Villain de Gand (1569–1644) was a bishop of Tournai in the Habsburg Netherlands.

== Life ==
Villain was the son of Adam Villain de Gand, governor of Lille, Douai and Orchies, and Philippine de Jausse de Mastaing. He was ordained to the priesthood on 12 December 1587 and was appointed to a canonry in the cathedral chapter of Tournai. On 18 December 1614 his name was put forward to succeed Michel d'Esne as bishop. The nomination received papal confirmation on 1 December 1615 and Villain took possession of his see on 28 February 1616. He was consecrated as bishop in Tournai cathedral on 14 March.

In 1621 Villain preached a sermon in memory of the deceased Archduke Albert. On 12 September 1636 he gave a silver reliquary containing relics of St Maximilian to his cathedral church. He had earlier commissioned two paintings for the cathedral from Peter Paul Rubens, The Triumph of Judas Maccabeus and The Deliverance of Souls from Purgatory. He died in Tournai on 29 November 1644 and was buried in his cathedral.

== Publications ==
- Manuale pastorum ad usum ecclesiarum civitatis et dioecesis Tornacensis (Tournai, Quinqué, 1625)
- Methodus sacrum Missae sacrificium celebrandi romano ritu (Tournai, Quinqué, 1627)

Catholic Church titles
Preceded by Michel d'Esne	Bishop of Tournai; 1616–1644	Succeeded by François Villain
