= Maximilien Morillon =

Catholic Prelate

- Church: Catholic
- Diocese: Tournai
- See: Notre-Dame de Tournai
- Installed: 27 October 1583
- Predecessor: Pierre Pintaflour
- Successor: Jean Vendeville
- Other post: Vicar General of the Archdiocese of Mechelen

Orders
- Consecration: 26 October 1583

Personal details
- Born: 1516 or 1517 Brussels, Duchy of Brabant, Habsburg Netherlands
- Died: 27 March 1586 Tournai, Tournaisis, Habsburg Netherlands
- Buried: Tournai Cathedral
- Occupation: Lawyer
- Education: University of Leuven

Maximilien Morillon (1516/17–1586) was a senior clergyman in the Habsburg Netherlands who became bishop of Tournai.

== Life ==
Morillon was born in Brussels in 1516 or 1517, the son of Gui Morillon, a Burgundian who was professor of Greek at Leuven University. He himself graduated from the university in 1538 with the degree of Licentiate of Laws and entered holy orders against his parents' wishes. He served Cardinal Granvelle as a secretary and was appointed canon and scholaster of Arras. He went on to amass a series of ecclesiastical benefices through Granvelle's patronage, including canonries in Mechelen, Ghent, Brussels, Tournai, Veurne and Lille, and the archdeaconry of St. Mary's Church, Utrecht. He was also a friend and executor of Viglius, president of the Brussels Council of State. When Granvelle became archbishop of Mechelen, Morillon served as his vicar general, and acted on his behalf in selectively communicating and enforcing the papal condemnation of the theology of Michael Baius. In 1569 he founded the first diocesan seminary in Mechelen.

During the Dutch Revolt he was briefly imprisoned by the rebels, and spent years in exile in Wallonia. On 13 March 1582, Philip II of Spain nominated him as bishop of Tournai. After papal confirmation, Morillon was consecrated on 26 October 1583 and enthroned the following day. He died suddenly on 27 March 1586 and was buried in his cathedral.

Catholic Church titles
Preceded by Pierre Pintaflour	Bishop of Tournai; 1583–1586	Succeeded by Jean Vendeville
