= Jean Vendeville =

Catholic bishop and lawyer

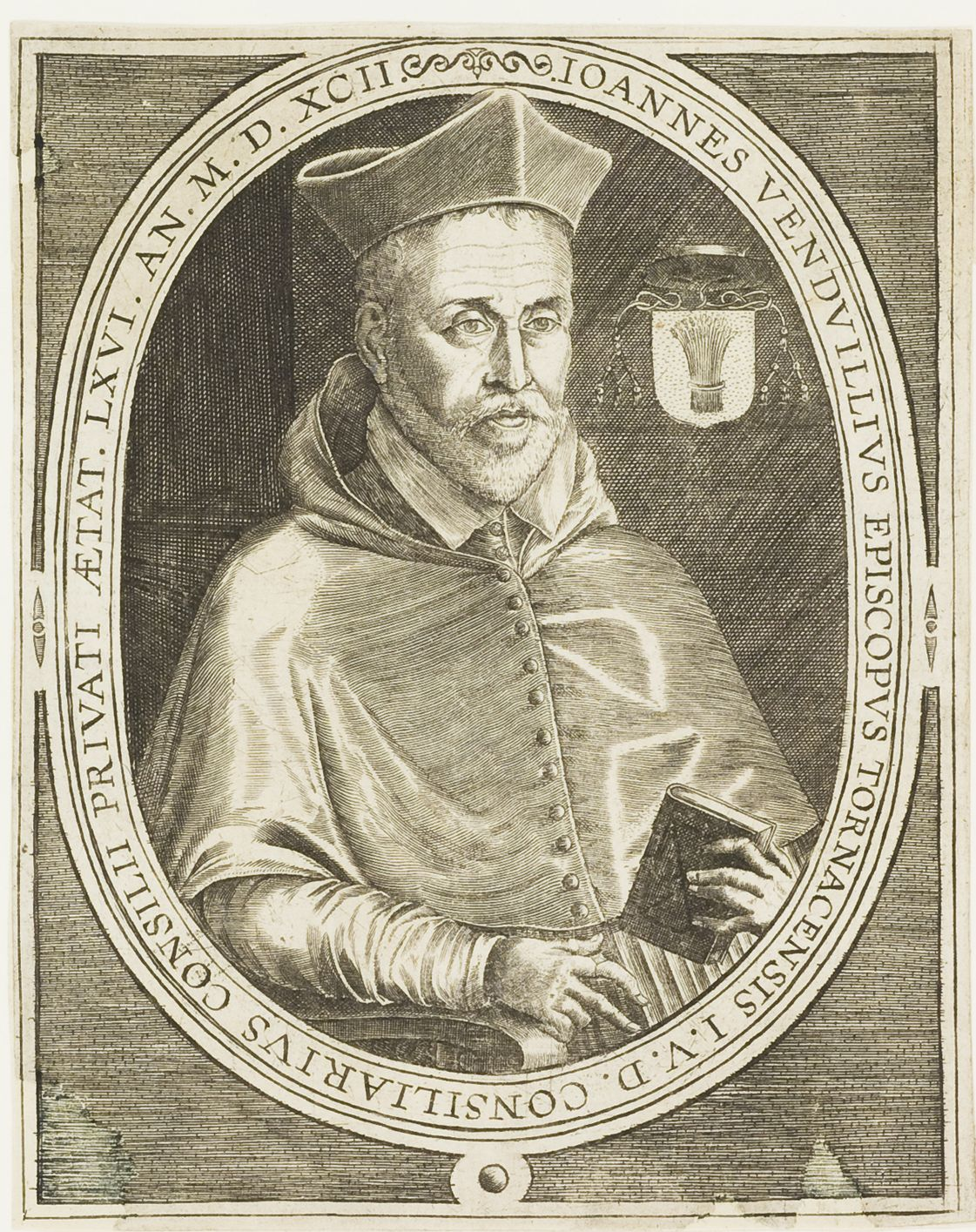
- Church: Catholic
- Diocese: Tournai
- See: Notre-Dame de Tournai
- Predecessor: Maximilien Morillon
- Successor: Michel D'Esne

Orders
- Consecration: 29 May 1588

Personal details
- Born: 24 June 1527
- Died: 15 October 1592 (aged 65) Tournai, Tournaisis, Habsburg Netherlands
- Buried: Tournai Cathedral
- Occupation: Lawyer
- Education: University of Paris; University of Leuven

Jean Vendeville (24 June 1527 – 15 October 1592) was a law professor and a bishop of Tournai.

== Life ==
Vendeville was possibly born in Lille, the son of Guillaume Vendeville and Marie Des Barbieux. He went to school in Menin, and from the age of fifteen in Paris, where he studied law, beginning a legal practice in Arras. In 1551 he married Anne Roelofs, of Leuven, and in 1553 he obtained a doctorate in laws from the University of Leuven. In 1562 he was appointed professor of law at the newly founded University of Douai. He was influential in rallying secular support for the first establishment of diocesan seminaries in the Low Countries, and for the establishment of a Jesuit college at Douai. He travelled to Rome to promote the establishment of missionary seminaries, and journeyed back to the Low Countries in company with William Allen, whom he encouraged to found an English College at Douai.

Vendeville was widowed in the early stages of the Dutch Revolt, and briefly went into exile as a public supporter of the royal cause. He conducted negotiations on behalf of the royalist interest in the Low Countries, and was named a privy councillor by Philip II of Spain, but in 1580 he resigned from public life to enter holy orders. He was ordained priest in 1581. He was particularly noted for his charity during the dearth of 1586. The king proposed him as bishop of Tournai in 1586, the appointment was confirmed in 1587, and he was consecrated as bishop on 29 May 1588. In 1589 he called a synod for the implementation of the Tridentine reforms in his diocese.

He died on 15 October 1592 and was buried the next day in the choir of Tournai Cathedral.

Catholic Church titles
| Preceded by Maximilien Morillon | Bishop of Tournai; 1586–1592 | Succeeded by Michel D'Esne |
