= Frédéric Rossignol =

Belgian Catholic prelate (born 1974)

His Excellency, The Most Reverend Frédéric Rossignol CSSp
- Bishop of Tournai
- See: Tournai
- Appointed: 6 October 2025
- Installed: 14 December 2025
- Predecessor: Guy Harpigny

Orders
- Ordination: 11 December 2005
- Consecration: 14 December 2025 by Luc Terlinden

Personal details
- Born: 5 January 1974 (age 52) Sint-Agatha-Berchem, Belgium
- Motto: Mirabilia fecit (Latin for 'He has done marvelous deeds')
- Coat of arms: Styles
- Reference style: His Excellency; The Most Reverend
- Spoken style: Your Excellency
- Religious style: Bishop

Frédéric Pierre Rossignol, C.S.Sp. (born 5 January 1974) is a Belgian Catholic prelate serving as Bishop of Tournai since 2025. Before his appointment as bishop, he worked first as a missionary in Vietnam and Bolivia, and later as the spiritual director of the Saint Paul the Apostle Pontifical Missionary College in Rome.

== Biography ==
=== Early life ===
Frédéric Pierre Rossignol was born in Sint-Agatha-Berchem, in the outskirts of Brussels, Belgium on 5 January 1974. After having completing his secondary education and feeling a calling to the priesthood, he entered the major seminary of the Metropolitan Archdiocese of Mechelen–Brussels in 1993, where he studied for three years, obtaining a bachelor's degree in philosophy from the Université Catholique de Louvain (UCLouvain) in Louvain-la-Neuve. Still being somewhat hesitant towards his calling, he then continued his studies at the UCLouvain, graduating with a master's degree in criminology.

After graduation he worked a year as a volunteer in China with the Missions Etrangères in Paris. Following this experience he entered the Congregation of the Holy Spirit in 2000, completing his novitiate in Portugal and making his temporary vows in 2001. While in Portugal, he attended the Catholic University of Portugal in Porto, where he completed theological formation, graduating with a bachelor's degree in theology.

=== Priesthood and missionary career ===
Rossignol professed his perpetual vows as a Spiritan in 2005, and was ordained to the priesthood in Gentinnes on 11 December 2005. In 2007, he was sent to Vietnam, where he founded the country's first Spiritan community. He also spent time in the Philippines and worked as a deputy parish priest in Bolivia for a year between 2018 and 2019. Between 2021 and 2023, Rossignol served as regional superior for the communities of his order in Vietnam and India. In July of 2024, he was appointed spiritual director of Saint-Paul the Apostle Pontifical Missionary College in Rome, an institution that supports the formation of priests from missionary territories.

=== Bishop of Tournai ===
On 6 October 2025, Pope Leo XIV appointed Rossignol as the 101st Bishop of Tournai to succeed of Guy Harpigny. Rossignol himself was surprised by his own appointment, given that he spent most of the previous 26 years outside of the country in which his new diocese is located. He was consecrated bishop by Luc Terlinden, Archbishop of Mechelen–Brussels on 14 December 2025 in Cathedral of Our Lady in Tournai. As his episcopal motto, he chose Mirabilia fecit, after Psalm 97.

== Personal life ==
Rossignol is an authority on Asian culture and a lover of nature. He has a great affinity for the Focolare Movement. He is also a polyglot, being fluent in French, English, and Portuguese, and conversant in Spanish, Vietnamese, and Italian.
