= Moorsel =

- Deelgemeente
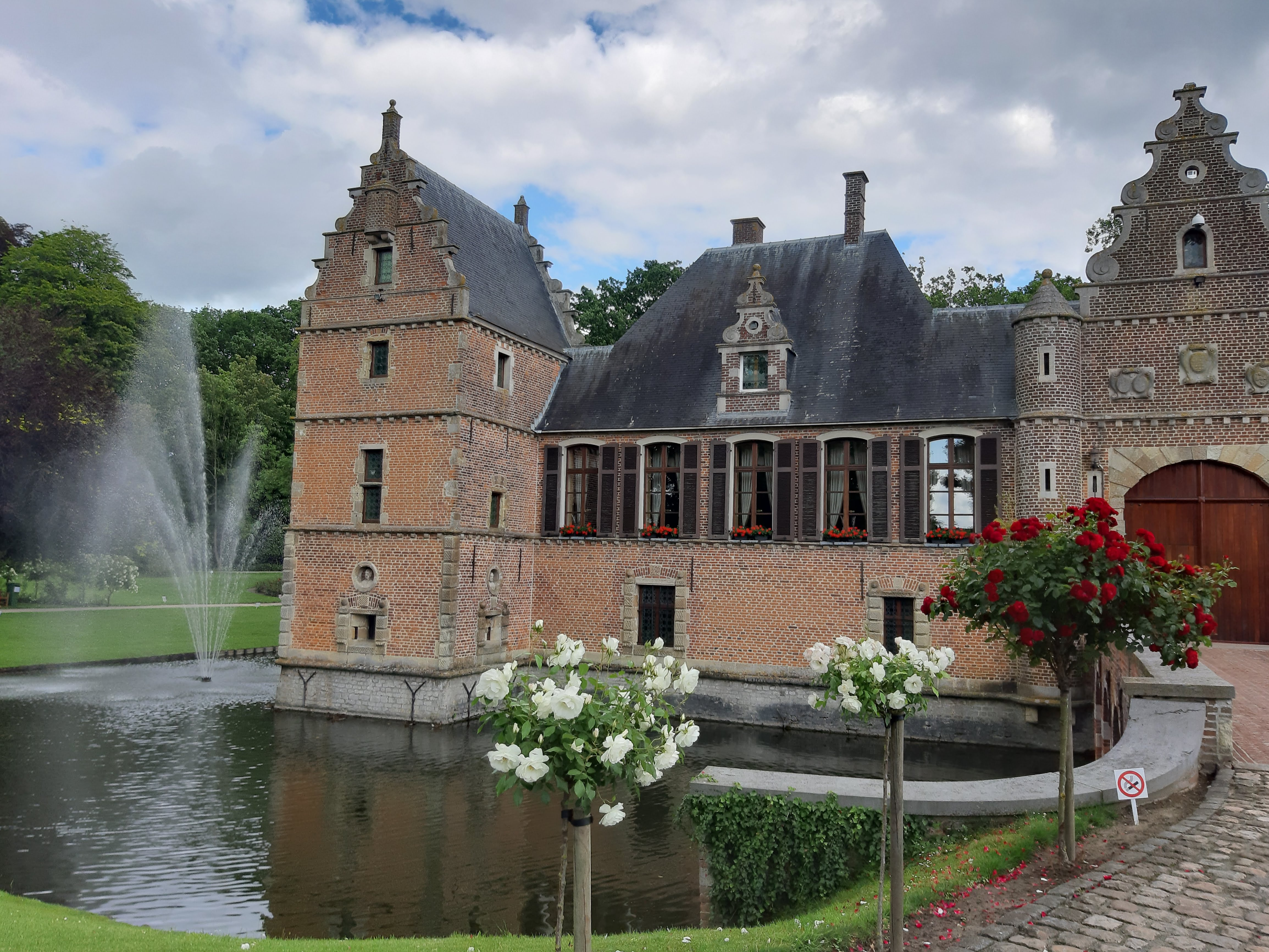
- Water castle of Moorsel

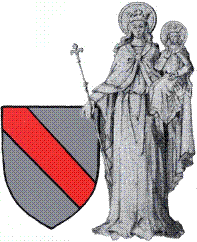
- Coat of arms

- Location within Belgium
- Coordinates: 50°56′51″N 4°05′57″E
- Country: Belgium
- Province: East Flanders
- Municipality: Aalst

Area
  - Total: 9.50 km^{2} (3.67 sq mi)

Population (2021)
  - Total: 5,175
  - Density: 545/km^{2} (1,410/sq mi)
- Postal code: 9310

Moorsel is a village in the Denderstreek in the province East Flanders in Belgium, a deelgemeente of the city of Aalst. The village belongs to a league of neighbouring villages, which call themselves the Faluintjesgemeenten. Moorsel is the largest of the four villages with approximately 5,175 inhabitants as of 2021.

== Name ==
Today's accepted spelling "Moorsel" dates merely from the 18th century. Latin spellings, such as Morcella or Morscella (adj. Morscellensis), are dating back to about 1048 (Vita S. Gudilae). The name itself appears to be a combination of moor (marshland) and sele or sall (dwelling), hence a dwelling located in marshland.

== History ==
Historical records about the village of Moorsel date back from the early Middle Ages. Approximately one-third of the territory, called Moorsel-proper, was controlled by a local landlord. His housings included a medieval moat, which is still visible in the landscape. The feudal title was elevated to a barony in 1661.

The other part of the village (Moorsel-kapittel) was owned by the chapter of Dendermonde, probably from 868 on. One of the largest landowners in the region was the Abbey of Affligem, who possessed the church and the parish of Moorsel. Abbot Karl de Croy, Bishop of Tournai, built a water castle at Moorsel in 1546. Only after the French Revolution the feudal parts of the village (Moorsel-proper and Moorsel-kapittel), as well as the ecclesiastical influence of Affligem, were abolished.

== Landmarks ==
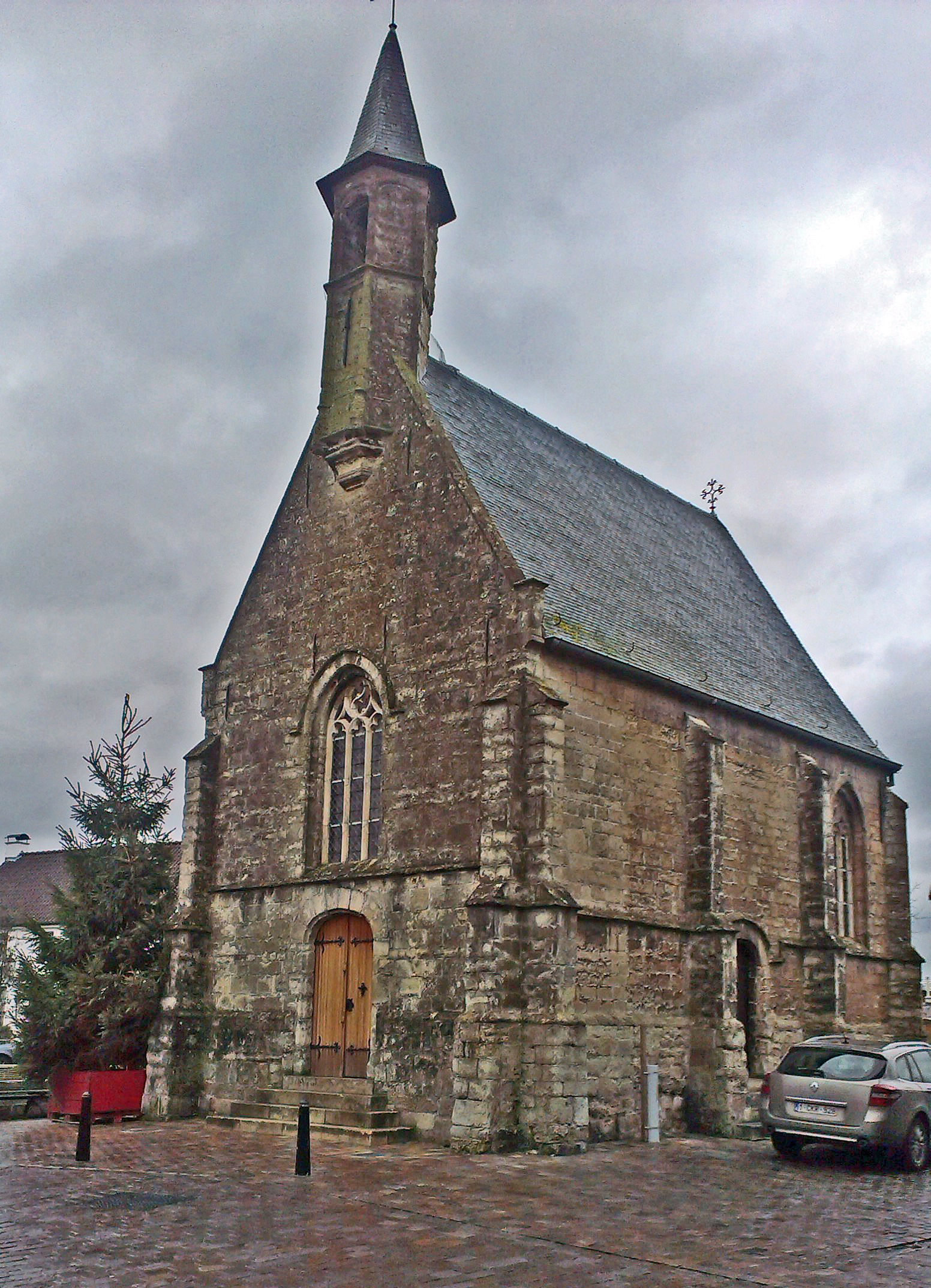
Sint-Gudulakapel

Moorsel is home to a chapel dedicated to Saint Gudula. According to the Life of St. Gudula, she visited daily the church of Moorsel, two miles away from her home. The 14th century structure was built with sandstone from Meldert, one of the Faluintjesgemeenten.

The parish church is dedicated to Saint Martin of Tours. The Romanesque substructure dates from the 12th century. According local tradition, it is based on the foundations of the 7th century St. Salvator church, which Saint Gudula daily visited. The church counts three altars in baroque style, constructed by Jacob Ulner. Another curiosity is the renaissance castle, which is still preserved in its original condition. The castle is constructed was intended as a summer residence for the Karl de Croy, Abbot of the Abbey of Affligem and later on Bishop of Tournai.

== Coat of arms ==
The village's coat of arms was granted 26 March 1914. The heraldic blazon can be described as follows: A shield of Argent with a bend of Gules, standing next to the left of the Virgin Mary, who is holding in her right hand a scepter, and bearing in her left arm the Child Jesus, both covered with a flowing mantle, their heads crowned and aureoled, all in Argent.

== Gallery ==
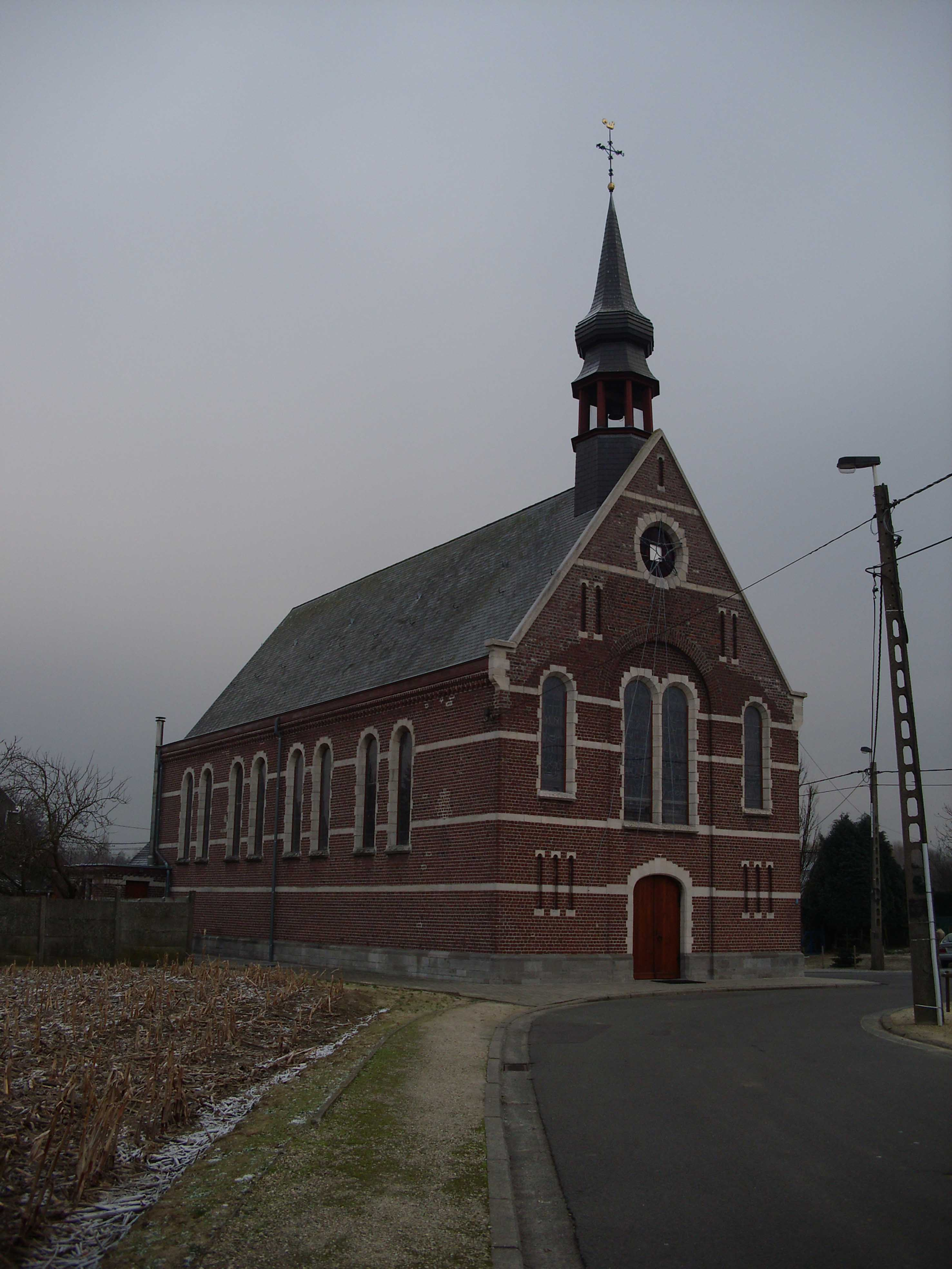
St Stefanus Church

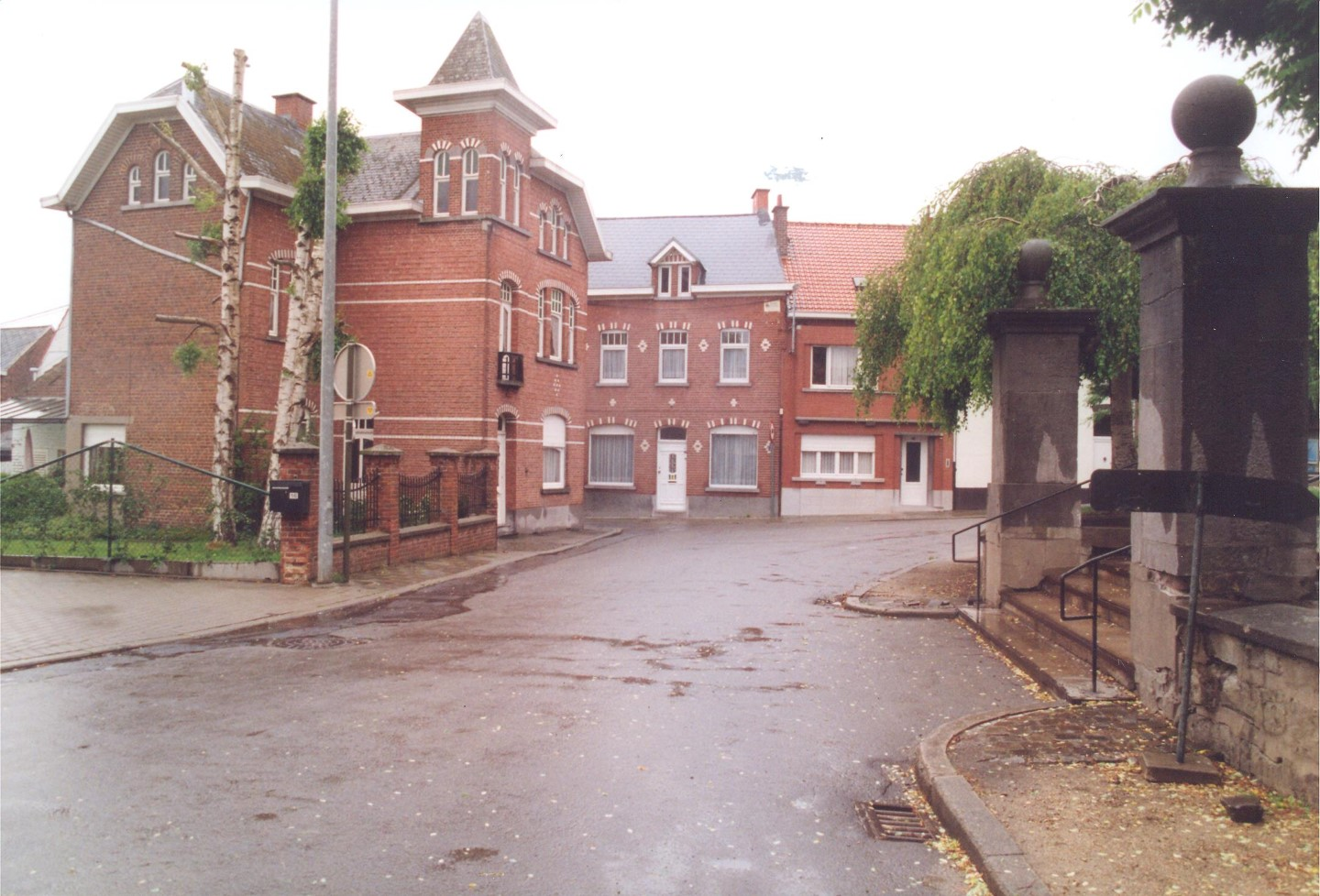
Street view

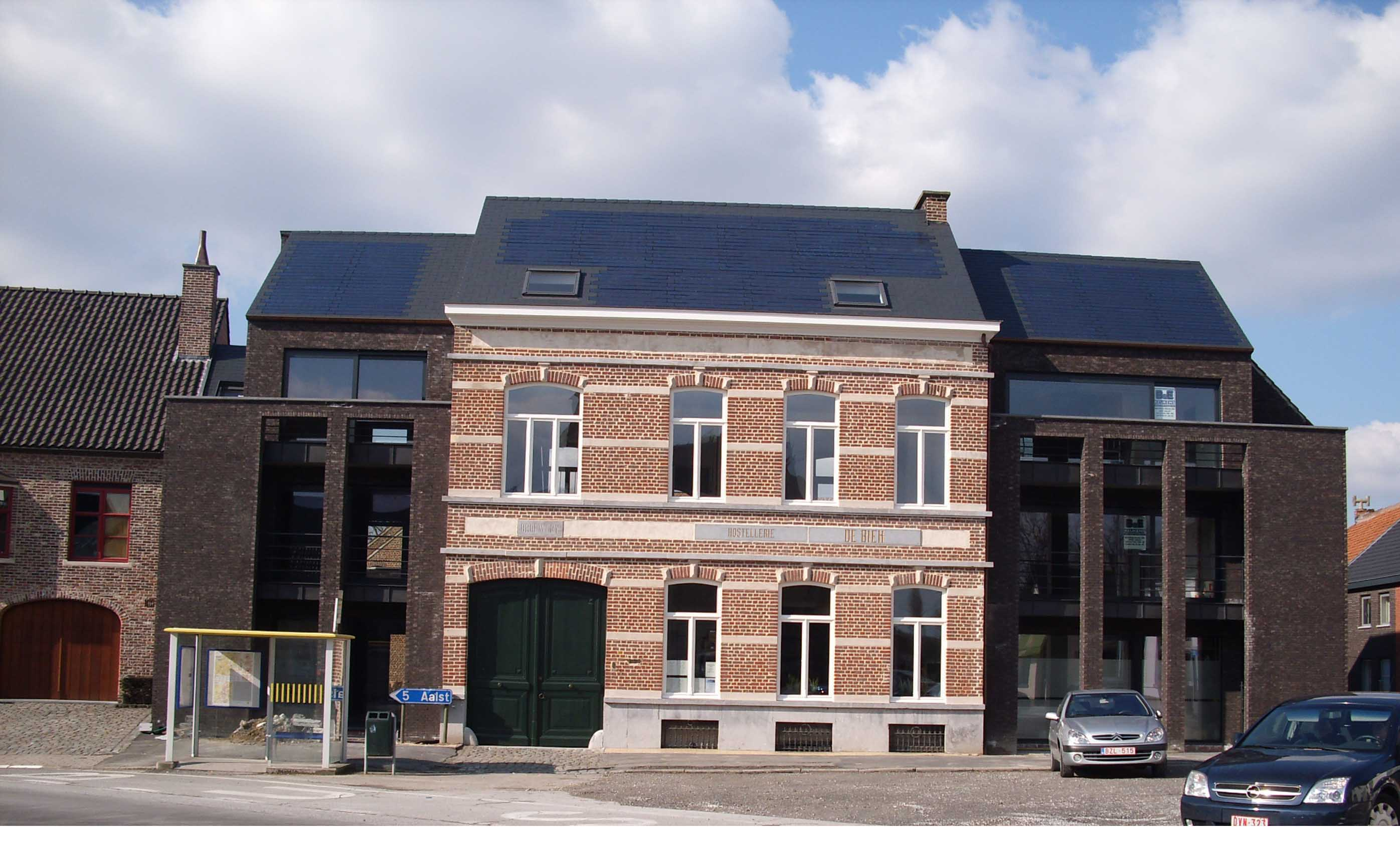
Brewery De Valk

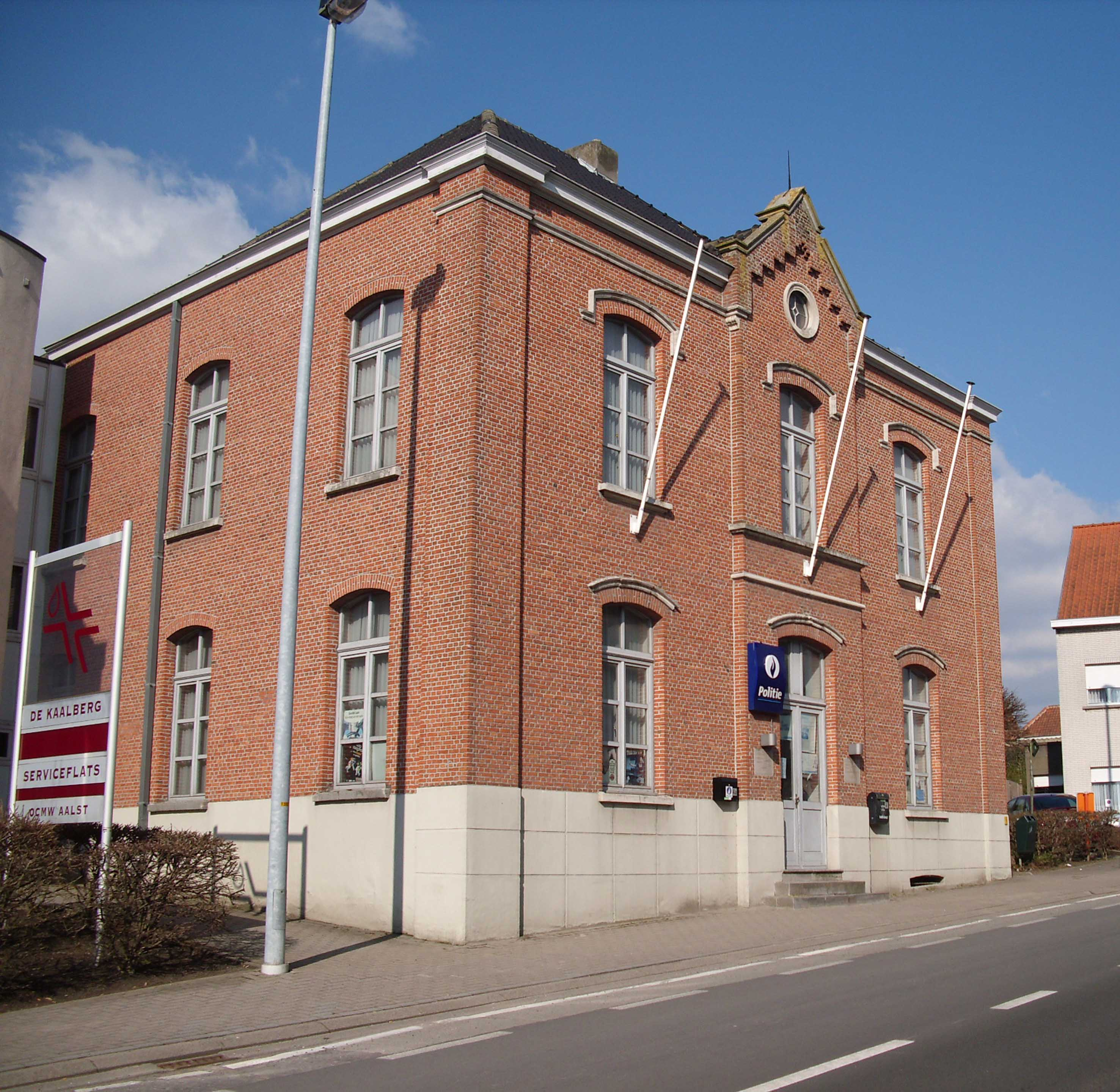
Former town hall
