= Michel d'Esne =

- Church: Catholic
- Diocese: Tournai
- See: Notre-Dame de Tournai
- Predecessor: Jean Vendeville
- Successor: Maximilien Villain

Orders
- Ordination: 5 January 1589

Personal details
- Born: 1540
- Died: 1 October 1614 (aged 73–74)
- Motto: Virtute non sanguine

Michel d'Esne de Betencourt (1540–1614) was a prelate in the Habsburg Netherlands.

== Life ==
D'Esne was born in early January 1540, either in Tournai or in Cambrai, the son of Adam d'Esne, lord of Betencourt, and Bonne de Lalaing. He was educated at Houdain college in Mons and at the age of fifteen became a page at the court of Philip II of Spain. He went on to serve as a soldier for six years in Flanders and Spain. D'Esne then studied theology and poetry, and on 5 January 1589 was ordained to the priesthood. Living in Douai, he spent his time translating devotional and edifying works.

In 1597 Philip II nominated him as bishop of Tournai; papal confirmation followed on 29 November 1597. During his reign as bishop, d'Esne founded or oversaw the establishment of numerous educational and charitable foundations. In 1600, he held a reforming diocesan synod in Tournai, the statutes of which were published. He died on 1 October 1614 and was buried in the choir of Tournai Cathedral.

== Translations ==
- Les quinze mystères du rosaire de la sacrée vierge Marie (Antwerp, Plantin Press, 1588)
- Recueil de tout ce qui s'est faict au Consistoire assemblé à Rome par N.S.P. le pape Grégoire XIII où furent receus les embassadeurs des trois rois du Jappon, et presterent publiquement obéissance à Sa Sainteté le xxiij mars l'an 1585 (Douai, Widow of Jacques Boscard, 1593)
- Giovanni Pietro Maffei, Le trois livres de la vie du père Ignace de Loyole qui a fonde la compagnie de Jesus (Douai, Jan Bogard, 1594)
- Lettre du Japon des années 1591 et 1592 (Douai, Jan Bogard, 1595)
- Pedro de Ribadeneira, La vie du père François de Borja (Douai, Balthazar Bellerus, 1596)
- John Brugman, La vie de la très Saincte et vrayment admirable vierge Ludyvine (Douai, Balthazar Bellerus, 1608)

Catholic Church titles
Preceded by Jean Vendeville	Bishop of Tournai; 1597–1614	Succeeded by Maximilien Villain
