= John of Enghien (bishop) =

Roman Catholic bishop (died 1281)

John of Enghien (died 1281) was the 54th bishop of Tournai and the 69th bishop of Liège in the Low Countries.

== Life ==
John of Enghien was born to a noble family in the County of Hainaut, son of Siger of Enghien and Alix of Sotteghem. He was appointed to a canonry of Tournai Cathedral, where he established a reputation as a theologian and in 1266 was elected bishop. He was enthroned as bishop on 8 January 1267. In 1274, when Henry of Guelders resigned as bishop of Liège, John was designated as his successor by Pope Gregory X during the Second Council of Lyon.

His predecessor, Henry of Guelders, claimed he was still owed money by the cathedral chapter of Liège and John of Enghien agreed to a meeting with him in Hoegaarden. Henry had him seized and carried off, but during the abduction he was mortally wounded. He died of his wounds at Heylissem, near Tienen, on 24 August 1281.
