= François Villain =

François Villain de Gand
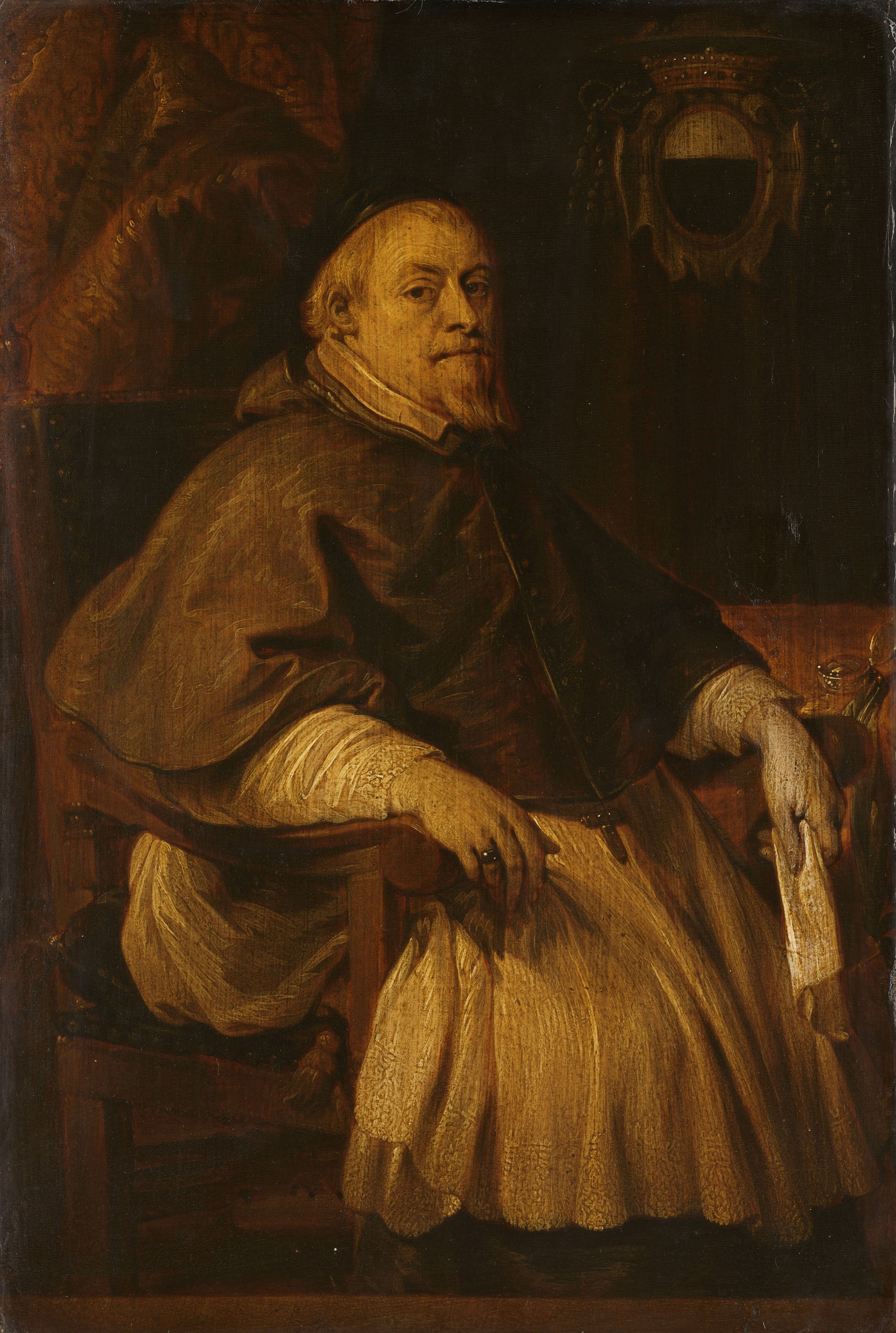
- Church: Catholic
- Diocese: Tournai
- See: Notre-Dame de Tournai
- Predecessor: Maximilien Villain
- Successor: Gilbert de Choiseul du Plessis-Praslin

Personal details
- Born: 1588
- Died: 1666 (aged 77–78)

François Villain de Gand (1588–1666), baron of Rassenghiem, was a bishop of Tournai in the Habsburg Netherlands.

== Life ==
Villain, born in 1588, was the nephew and successor as bishop of Maximilien Villain. He became bishop in 1647, the last bishop of Tournai to be nominated by the king of Spain.. He remained bishop until his death on 28 December 1666.

Catholic Church titles
Preceded by Maximilien Villain	Bishop of Tournai; 1647–1666	Succeeded by Gilbert de Choiseul du Plessis-Praslin
