= Gaston-Antoine Rasneur =

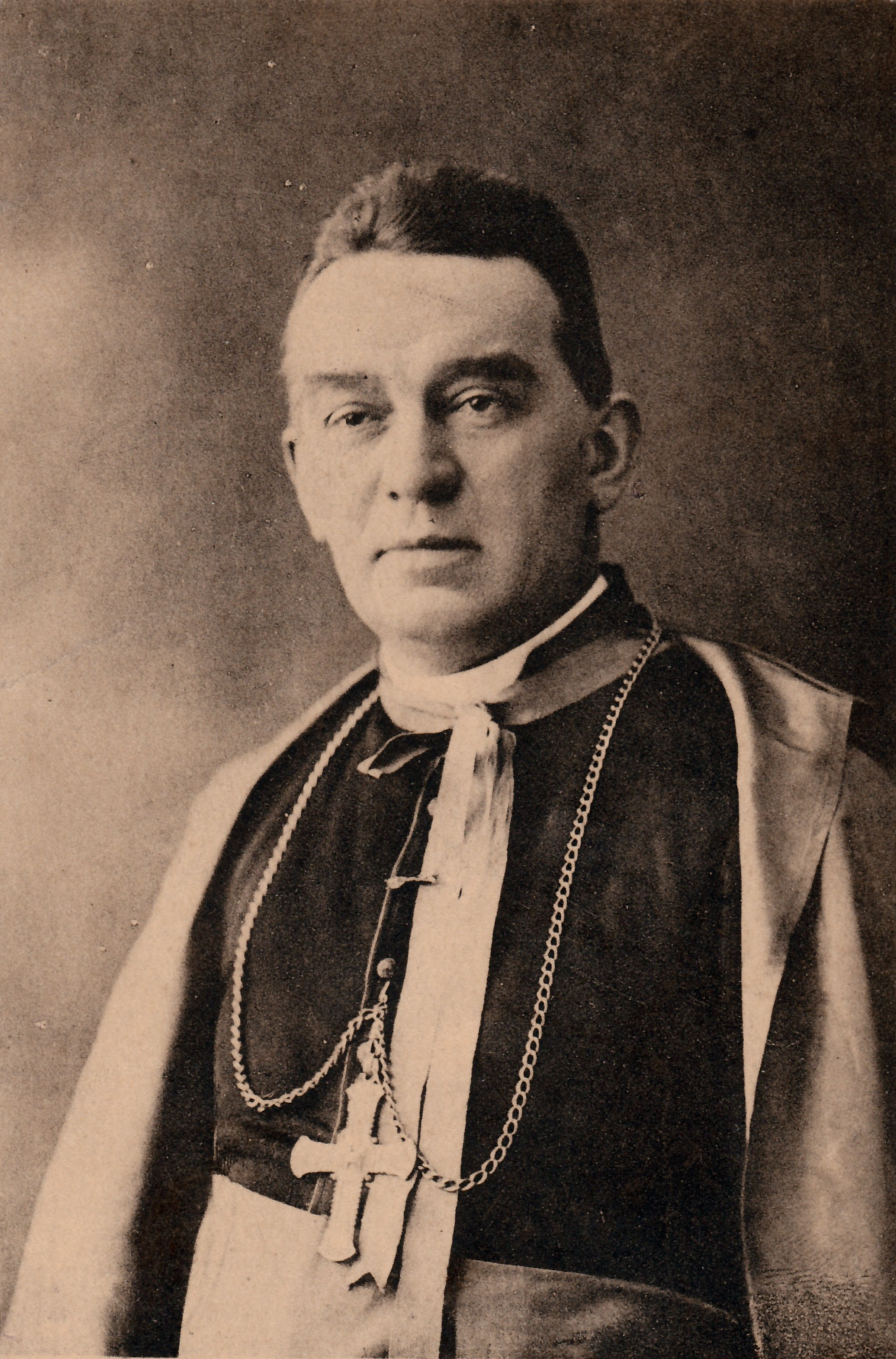
- Church: Catholic
- Diocese: Tournai
- See: Notre Dame de Tournai
- Appointed: 1924
- Predecessor: Amédée Crooy
- Successor: Louis Delmotte
- Previous posts: Professor of Sacred Scripture, Tournai seminary; vicar general of the diocese

Orders
- Ordination: 1899
- Consecration: 25 March 1924

Personal details
- Born: 26 February 1874
- Died: 23 November 1939 (aged 65)
- Education: Catholic University of Leuven
- Motto: Dominus illuminatio mea (Psalm 27)
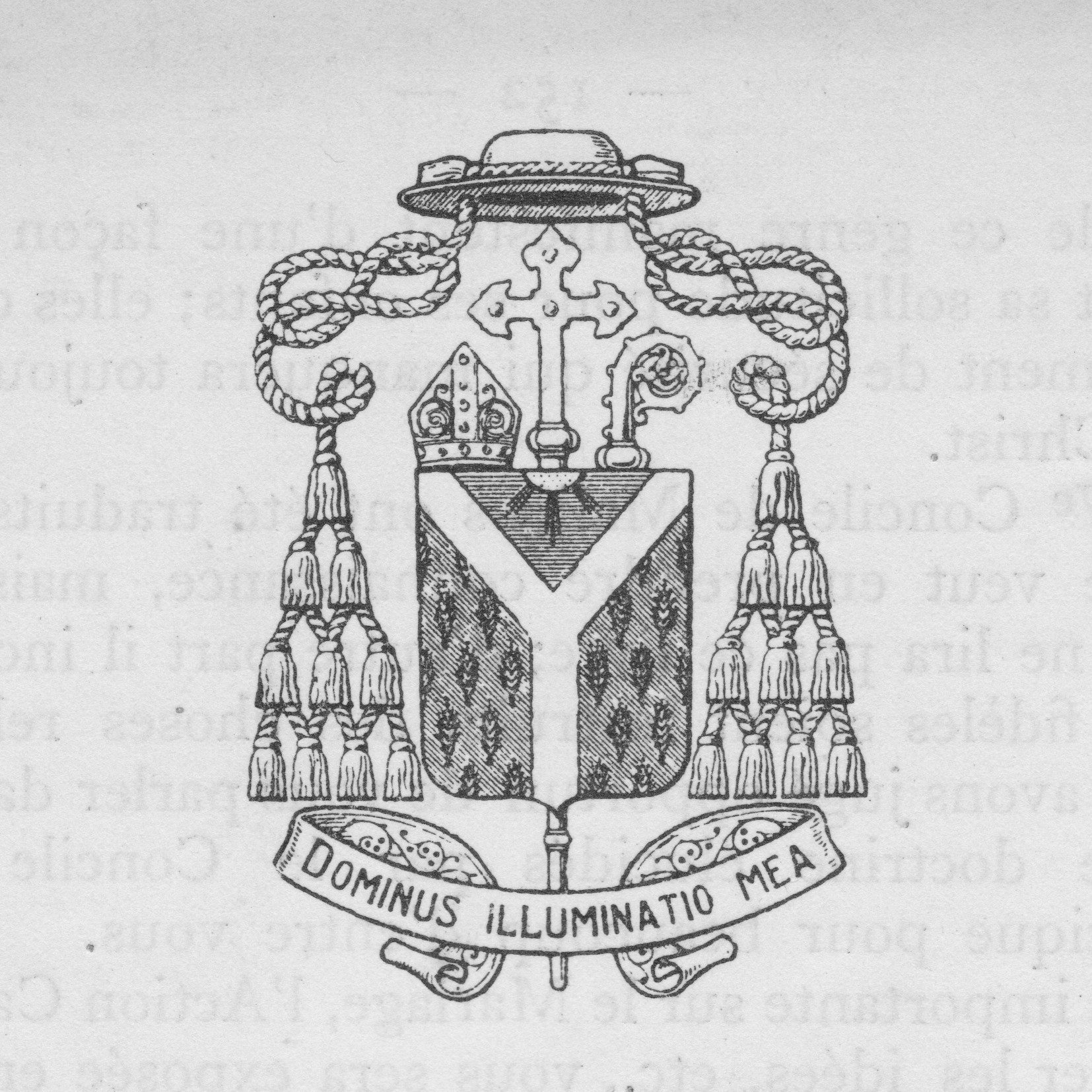
- Coat of arms

Gaston-Antoine Rasneur (1874–1939) was bishop of Tournai from 1924 to 1939.

== Life ==
Rasneur was born in on 26 February 1874. He was ordained to the priesthood for the diocese of Tournai in 1899 and graduated Doctor of Sacred Theology from the Catholic University of Leuven in 1902. From 1906 to 1911 he was professor of Sacred Scripture at the Major Seminary, Tournai. He was appointed dean of Châtelet in 1911 and served as vicar general from 1921 to 1924. On 6 April 1922 he was awarded a knighthood in the Order of Leopold. He became bishop of Tournai in 1924, serving until his death on 23 November 1939. He played a leading role in Pope Pius XI's condemnation of Action Française in 1926.

== Writings ==
- "Le Concile de Cologne de 346", Bulletin de la Commission Royale d'Histoire, 72 (1903), pp. 27–59.
