= Jean IV. des Prés =

Jean des Prés (died 13 June 1349) was the Bishop of Tournai from 1342 until his death.

== Mass of Tournai ==
In 1349 Jean des Prés established a daily sung Mass which called for six trained singers. This may have been when the Mass of Tournai, which dates from the mid fourteenth century, started to be used regularly.

== Death ==
Bishop Jean des Prés' last days were described by Gilles Li Muisis. Li Muisis states that the Bishop often traveled in search of healthy air. On 11 June 1349, Jean des Prés was at Cambrai where he performed divine service celebrating the feast of Corpus Christi. It was a hot day, and as part of the service he carried a heavy vessel in which the Sacrament was held. However, Li Muisis observed, at dinner that evening the bishop appeared fit and in good spirits.

The next day, while traveling to Le Cateau-Cambrésis, the bishop informed his companions that he was not feeling well. They reached the town, and the following morning, Saturday 13 June, Jean des Prés heard mass and prepared to depart, but then returned to bed, where he died of the black death. His companions took his body back to Tournai where he was buried on 18 June.

Catholic Church titles
Preceded by André Ghini	Bishop of Tournai; 1342–1349	Succeeded by Pierre de Forest
