= Walter of Marvis =

Flemish priest

Walter of Marvis (ca.1175 - 1252) was a leading Flemish churchman who served between 1219 and 1252 as the Bishop of Tournai / Doornik, a time during which the diocese also included the modern dioceses of Bruges and Ghent.

== Biography ==
Walter came from the Marvis quarter of the parish of St. Brice in Tournai. The earliest clear mention of him dates from 1205 by which time he was already and canon, deacon and school master ("Magister Walterus") at the Cathedral of Our Lady. He had received his own early education at the cathedral's chapter school, before going away to complete his studies in Theology at the newly founded College of Sorbonne in Paris. Returning to Tournai, between 1205 and 1220 he was employed as a teacher at the chapter school which he had himself attended as a boy. The first mention of his having become an ordained priest dates from 1212. His teaching responsibilities did not prevent him from joining the Fifth Crusade in 1218. By this time the crusading armies had moved on to Egypt, and he arrived at Damietta, which fell to the westerners on 8 November 1219. While in Egypt he encountered the man who later became canonised as Saint Francis of Assisi, and who is described in at least one source as "a negotiator with the sultan" (although there appears to be little clarity over what was actually discussed during the few days when the future saint was "graciously received" by the sultan). Many crusaders returned to the west early and it is likely that by the end of 1219 Walter of Marvis was back in the west. While he was away Bishop Gossuinus of Tournai had died on 29 October 1218. Walter of Tournai was elected to succeed him in or shortly after November 1219. The appointment was confirmed in January 1220 and he was consecrated as Bishop of Tournai on 17 February 1220.

Between 1226 and 1229 Bishop Marvis was active in support of the pope's intensifying struggle against Catharism, and in 1233 he participated at the Council of Béziers as a Legate of the Holy See. The council appears to have been part of the larger inquisitorial operation against Cathars in the aftermath of the Albigensian Crusade in the Languedoc region. On the occasion of the Council, Walter de Marvis published twenty-six regulations.

During the years that followed his work, always in the service of the pope, was focused on his own diocese in West Flanders, which was undergoing a period of repaid economic development. He increased regulation of the convents and monasteries. He founded or authorised new hospices and beguinages, notably the one in Bruges (since 1927 used as a convent), which in 1245 was granted recognition as an individual parish in its own right.

In the County of Flanders he left a lasting historical footprint, notably, through the creation of a large number of new parishes, especially in the large area of heathland between Aalter and Bruges known as the Bulskampveld, in the Waasland and in the Meetjesland. In these regions progress was being made with draining and ditching the land, opening the way to more intensive patterns of agriculture, able to drive and support the expansion of the villages. In 1242 Marvis personally led a lengthy horseback journey round his newly enlarged diocese, probably starting from Bruges, to define a series of new parishes, placing crosses at parish boundaries or marking parish limits by having crosses marked on trees. A number of old street and locality names survive that attest to this exercise.

Back in Tournai he instigated a number of major construction projects. He commissioned the building of a trading hall ("cloth hall") on the Main square (Grand-place). He was also behind the rebuilding of an enlarged choir section of the cathedral, which was undertaken between 1243 and 1252 in the modern style of those times. Plans to replace the other half of the cathedral in the modern style came to nothing, however, leaving the building as an instructive contrast between the Romanesque and Gothic architectural styles. The Church of Sainte Marie Madeleine, which also used the Gothic style, was another construction for which Marvis was responsible.

== See also ==
- Reliquary Shrine of Saint Eleutherius
