= Diocese of Tournai =

Catholic ecclesiastical territory in Belgium

Diocese of Tournai Dioecesis Tornacensis Diocèse de Tournai (French) Bistum Tournai (German) Bisdom Doornik (Dutch)

Catholic
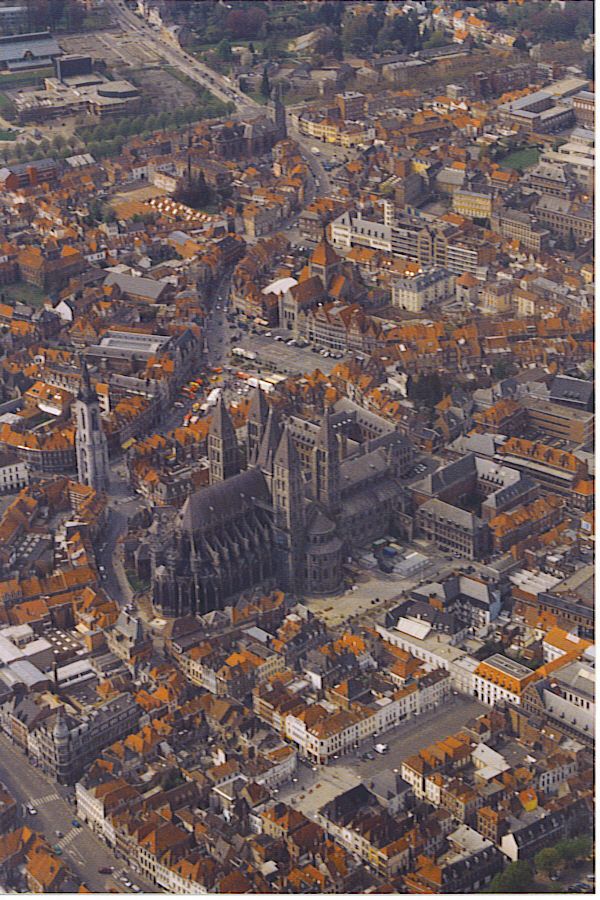
- Aerial view of Tournai Cathedral

Location
- Country: Belgium
- Ecclesiastical province: Mechelen-Brussels
- Metropolitan: Archdiocese of Mechelen-Brussels
- Coordinates: 50°36′26″N 3°23′18″E

Statistics
- Area: 3,796 km^{2} (1,466 sq mi)
- Population: Total; Catholics: (as of 2020); 1,344,241; 708,400 (52.7%)

Information
- Denomination: Catholic Church
- Sui iuris church: Latin Church
- Rite: Roman Rite
- Established: 6th Century
- Cathedral: Cathedral of Our Lady in Tournai

Current leadership
- Pope: Leo XIV
- Bishop: Frédéric Rossignol
- Metropolitan Archbishop: Luc Terlinden
- Bishops emeritus: Guy Harpigny

Map
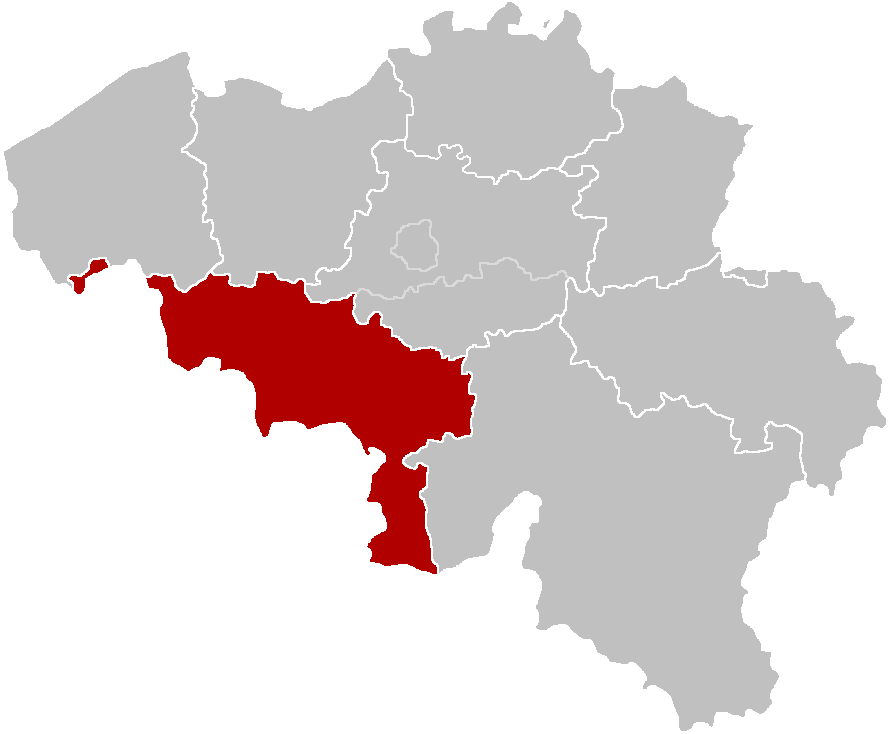
- The Diocese of Tournai, coextensive with the province of Hainaut

Website
- Website of the Diocese

The Diocese of Tournai (Latin: Dioecesis Tornacensis) is a Latin Church ecclesiastical territory or diocese of the Catholic Church in Belgium. The diocese was formed in 1146, upon the dissolution of the Diocese of Noyon and Tournai, which had existed since the 7th century. It is now suffragan in the ecclesiastical province of the metropolitan Archdiocese of Mechelen–Brussels. The cathedra is found within the Cathedral of Notre-Dame de Tournai, which has been classified both as a major site for Wallonia's heritage since 1936 and as a World Heritage Site since 2000.

== History ==
As early as the second half of the 3rd century St. Piat evangelized Tournai; some sources name him as the first bishop, but this remains unsubstantiated. At the end of the 3rd century Emperor Maximian rekindled persecutions, and St. Piat was martyred as a result.

Barbarian invasions began shortly afterwards. These lasted from the end of the 3rd century till the end of the 5th century. St. Remigius used the good-will of the Frankish monarchy to organize the Catholic hierarchy in the North of Gaul. He confided the Diocese of Arras and Cambrai to St. Vaast (Vedastus), and founded the See of Tournai (c. 500), appointing as its titular Eleutherius.

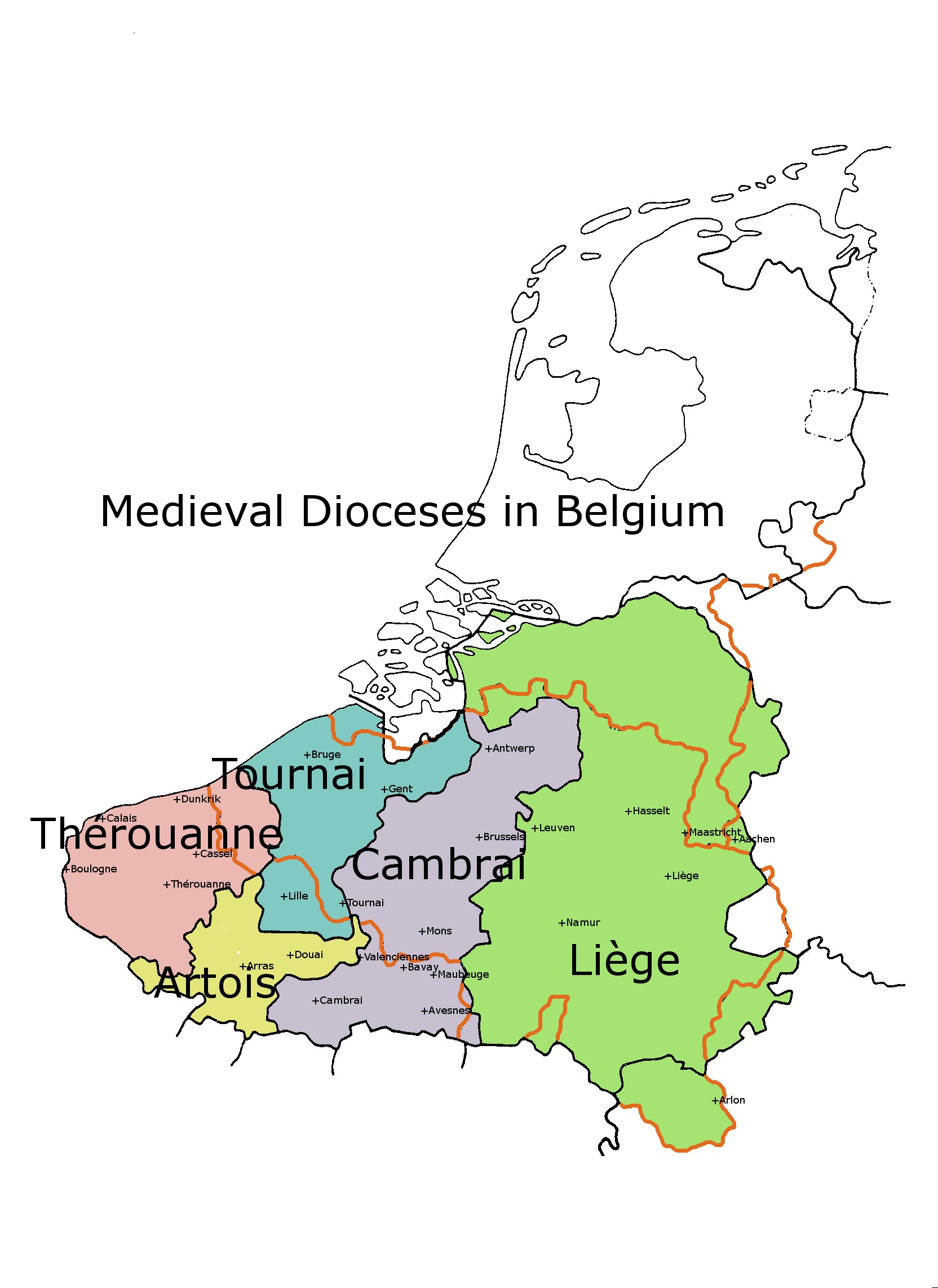
Medieval Catholic dioceses superimposed over modern-day Belgium. Tournai lies in the west.

It was probably its status of royal city which secured Tournai's early rise, only to lose its position as capital upon the departure of the Merovingian court. Nevertheless, it maintained its own bishops for nearly a century. Then, at about 626 or 627, under the episcopate of St. Achar, the sees of Tournai and Noyon were reunited, retaining however their separate structures. Tournai lost its privileges and was relegated to level of the neighbouring dioceses, such as Boulogne and Therouanne, Arras and Cambrai. The same ordinary held both sees for five hundred years. It was only in 1146 that Tournai received its own bishop.

Notable bishops are: St. Eleutherius (beginning of 6th century); St. Achar (626/27 – 1 March 637/38); St. Eloi (641–660); Simon de Vermandois (1121–1146); Walter de Marvis (1219–1251), the great founder of schools and hospitals; Etienne of Tournai (1192–1203), godfather of Louis VII of France and minister to the queen; Andrea Chini Malpiglia (1334–42), cardinal and papal legate; Guillaume Fillastre (1460–1473), chancellor of the Golden Fleece; Michel de Warenghien (1283–1291), a very erudite doctor; Michel d'Esne (1597–1614), the author of several works. Raphael de Mercatellis (1487–1507), illegitimate son of Philip the Good and noted bibliophile, was auxiliary bishop of Tournai.

During Spanish rule (1521–1667) the see continued to be occupied by natives of the country, but the seize of Tournai by Louis XIV in 1667 caused it to have a number of Frenchmen for bishop: Gilbert de choiseul duplessis praslin (1670–1689); François de La Salle de Caillebot (1692–1705); Louis Marcel de Coëtlogon (1705–1707); François de Beauveau (1708–1713). After the Treaty of Utrecht (1713) the French were replaced by Germans: Johann Ernst, Count of Löwenstein-Wertheim (1713–1731); Franz Ernst, Count of Salm-Reifferscheid (1731–1770); Wilhelm Florentine, Prince of Salm-Salm (1776–1794).

The reunion of the see with Noyon and the ensuing removal of the seat of the bishopric bolstered the chapter. The chapter's requirement to appoint only nobility and scholars, as set forth by the old régime, tended to attract the highly born and educated. Illustrious French and Belgian names are inscribed in the archive's registers and on the cathedral's tombstones. The cathedral, 439 feet (134 m) long by 216 feet (66 m) wide, is surmounted by 5 towers 273 feet (83 m) high. The nave and transept are Romanesque (12th century), while the choir is primary Gothic, begun in 1242 and completed in 1325.

Originally, the borders of the diocese arguably were those of the Civitas Turnacensium, as mentioned in the "Notice des Gaules". The prescriptions of councils and the interest of the Church both favoured such borders, and they were retained throughout the Middle Ages. The diocese then further extended along the left bank of the river Schelde, from the river Scarpe to the North Sea, with the exception of the Vier-Ambachten (Hulst, Axel, Bouchaute, and Assenede), which are said to have always belonged to the Diocese of Utrecht. The Schelde thus formed the natural border between the Dioceses of Tournai and Cambrai, cutting through the towns of Termonde, Ghent, Oudenarde, and Tournai itself. The North Sea seaboard between the Schelde and the Yser was wholly part of this perimeter. On the far side of the Yser resided the Diocese of Thérouanne, which bordered Tournai as far as Ypres. There began the Diocese of Arras, which bordered Tournai as far as the confluence of the Scarpe and the Schelde at Mortgne, France. This vast diocese was for a long time divided into three archdeaneries and twelve deaneries. The archdeanery of Bruges comprised the deaneries of Bruges, Ardenbourg, and Oudenbourg; the archdeanery of Ghent, the deaneries of Ghent, Roulers, Oudenarde, and Waes; the archdeanery of Tournai, the deaneries of Tournai, Seclin, Helchin, Lille, and Courtrai.

In 1559, to support the war against Protestantism, King Philip II of Spain obtained from Paul IV the foundation of a series of new dioceses. The ancient Diocese of Tournai was split up, with nearly two-thirds of its territory being cut away. The outlines of the archdeaneries of Bruges and Ghent formed the new diocese of Bruges and diocese of Ghent, and six parishes passed to the new diocese of Ypres. This situation lasted until the beginning of the 19th century. The French Revolution created the Department of Jemappes, which in 1815 became the Province of Hainaut, whose borders coincided with those of the Diocese of Tournai, after a concordat between the plenipotentiaries of Pius VI and the consular government of the republic. The Bishop of Tournai retained only two scores of the parishes formerly under his jurisdiction, but received on the right bank of the Schelde a number of parishes which, prior to the Revolution, had belonged to the Diocese of Cambrai (302), Namur (50), and Liège (50).

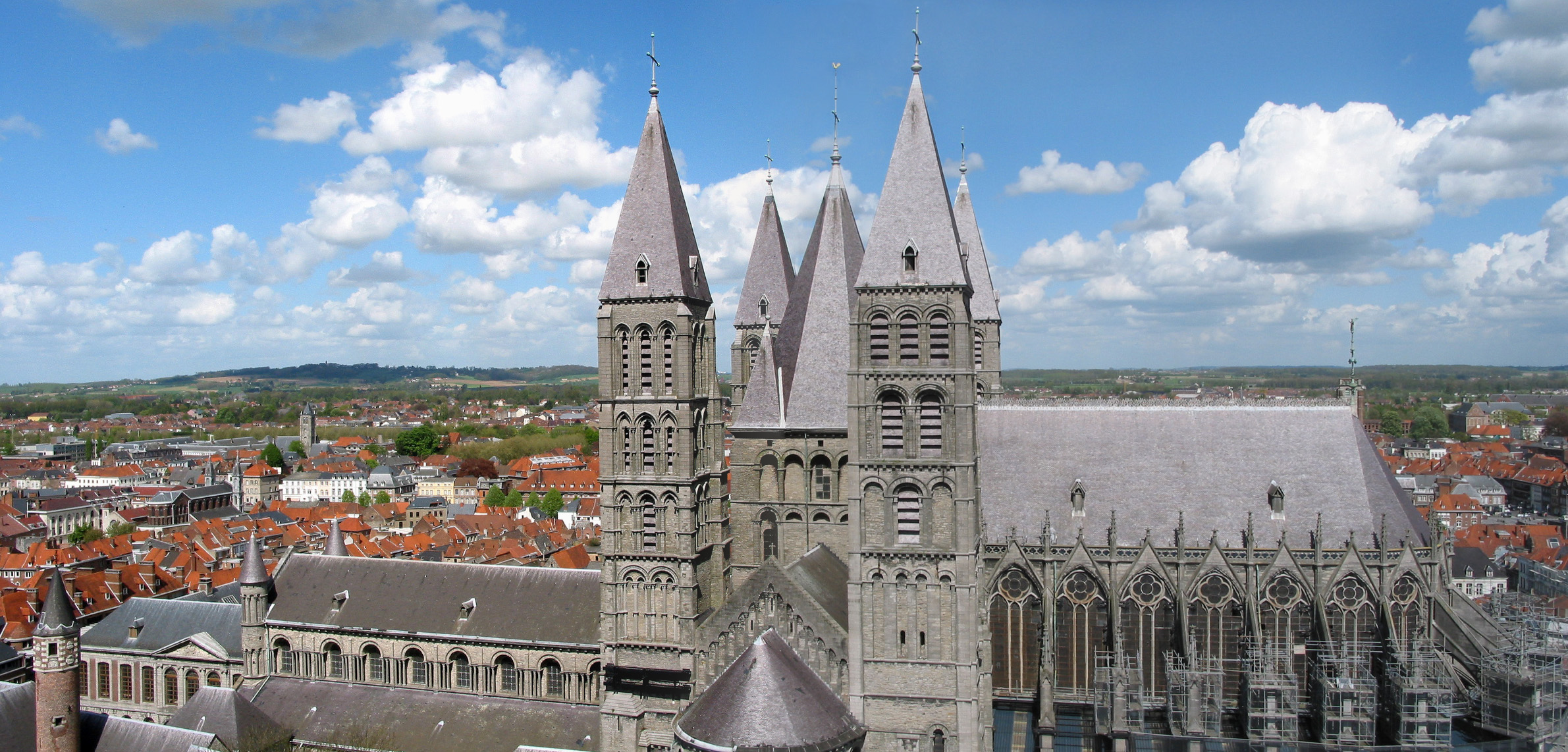
Tournai Cathedral

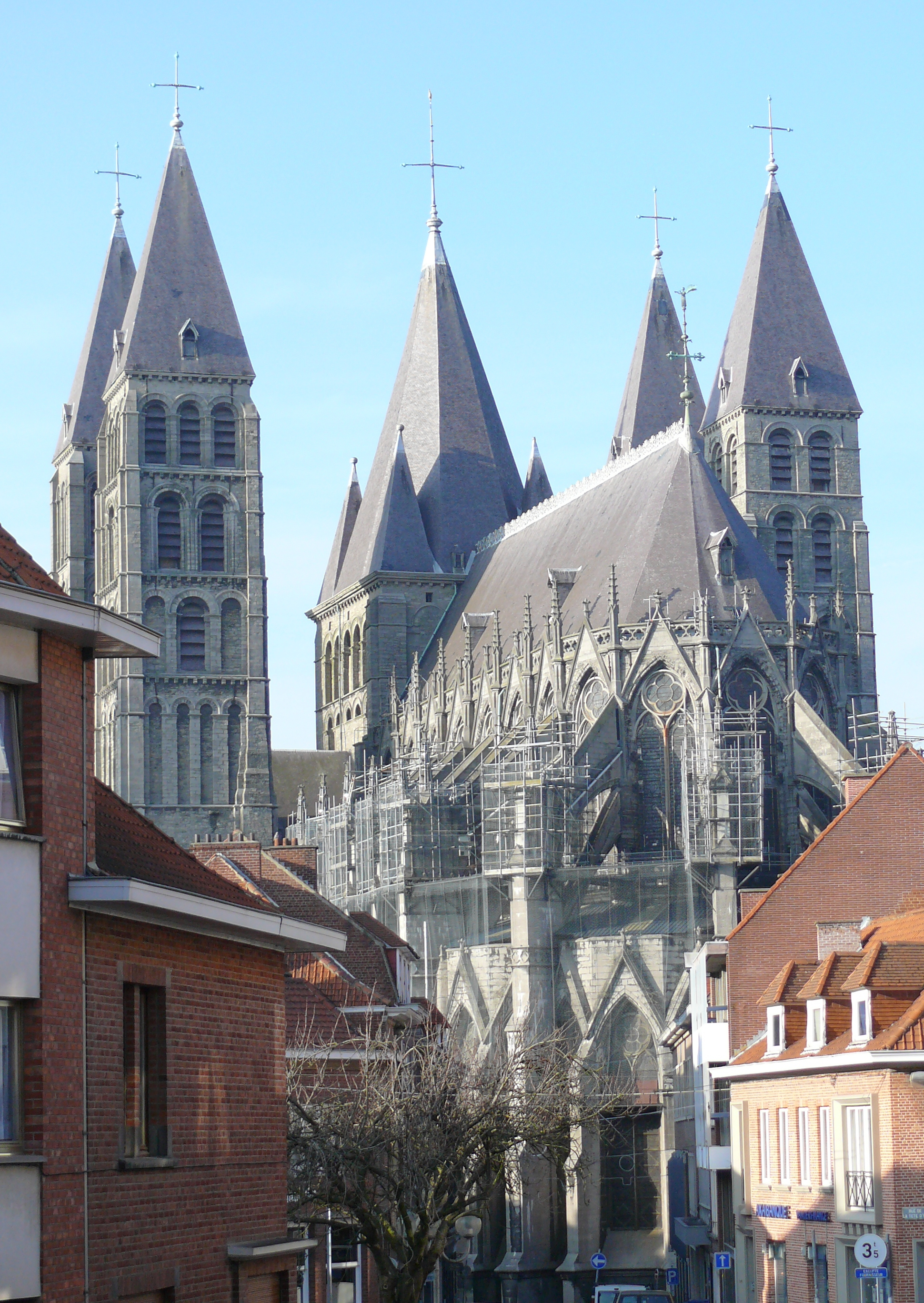
Rear view of Tournai Cathedral

== Bishops ==
=== To 1146 ===
- 540 : St. Eleutherius of Tournai (Eleuthere)
- c. 549 and 552 : Agrecius
- 545 : Medardus
- Then jointly with Noyon
- c. 626–c. 638 : Acarius
- 641–660 : Eligius
- c. 661–c. 686 : Mummolenus
- Gondoin
- c. 700 : Antgaire
- c. 715 : Chrasmar
- c. 721 : Garoul
- c. 723 : Framenger
- c. 730 : Hunuan
- c. 740 : Gui et Eunuce
- c. 748 : Elisée
- c. 756/765 : Adelfred
- ? : Didon
- 769–c. 782 : Giselbert
- c. 798/799 : Pleon
- c. 815 : Wendelmarus
- c. 830/838 : Ronegaire
- c. 830/838 : Fichard
- 840–860 : Immon
- 860–879 : Rainelme
- 880–902 : Heidilon
- 909 : Rambert
- 915–932 : Airard
- †936 : Walbert
- 937–950 : Transmar, Transmarus
- 950–954 : Rudolf
- 954–955 : Fulcher
- 955–977 : Hadulphe
- 977–988 : Liudolf of Vermandois
- 989–997 : Radbod I
- 1000–1030 : Hardouin
- 1030–1044 : Hugo
- 1044–1068 : Balduin
- 1068–1098 : Radbod II
- 1099–1112 : Baldric of Noyon
- 1114–1123 : Lambert
- 1123–1146 : Simon of Vermandois
- Diocese split

=== 1146 to 1500; bishops of Tournai ===
- 1146–1149 : Anselm
- 1149–1166 : Gerard
- 1166–1171 : Walter
- 1173–1190 : Everard
- 1193–1203 : Stephen of Tournai
- 1203–1218 : Gossuin
- 1219–1251 : Walter of Marvis
- 1252–1261 : Walter of Croix
- 1261–1266 : Johann I. Buchiau
- 1267–1274 : John of Enghien
- 1275–1282 : Philipp Mus
- 1283–1291 : Michael von Warenghien
- 1292–1300 : Johann III. von Vassogne
- 1301–1324 : Guy of Boulogne
- 1324–1326 : Elie de Ventadour
- 1326–1333 : Guillaume de Ventadour
- 1333 : Theobald of Saussoire
- 1334–1342 : André Ghini
- 1342–1349 : Jean IV. des Prés
- 1349–1350 : Pierre de Forest (also Bishop of Paris)
- 1351–1377 : Pierre d'Arbois
- 1379–1388 : Pierre d'Auxy
  - 1380–1384 : Jean de West
- 1388–1410 : Louis de la Trémouille
- 1410–1433 : Jean de Thoisy
- 1433–1437 : Jean d'Harcourt
- 1437–1460 : Jean Chevrot
- 1460–1473 : Guillaume Fillastre
- 1474–1483 : Ferry de Clugny
- 1483–1505 : Schism

=== 1500 to 1800 ===
- 1505–1513 : Charles de Hautbois
- 1514–1518 : Thomas Wolsey
- 1519–1524 : Louis Guillard, bishop-elect from 1513 but displaced by Wolsey until 1519
- 1524–1564 : Charles de Croÿ
- 1564–1574 : Gilbert d'Oignies
- 1574–1580 : Pierre Pintaflour
- 1583–1586 : Maximilien Morillon
- 1586–1592 : Jean Vendeville (Jean Venduille)
- 1592–1597 : Vacant
- 1597–1614 : Michel D'Esne
- 1614–1644 : Maximilien Villain
- 1644–1660 : François Villain
- 1660–1689 : Gilbert de Choiseul du Plessis-Praslin
- 1689–1705 : François de Caillebot de La Salle
- 1705–1707 : Louis-Marcel de Coëtlogon-Méjusseaume
- 1707–1713 : René de Beauveau (then Bishop of Toulouse)
- 1713–1731 : Johann Ernst von Löwenstein-Wertheim
- 1731–1770 : Franz Ernst von Salm-Reifferscheid
- 1770–1776 : Vacant
- 1776–1793 : Wilhelm Florentin von Salm-Salm (then Archbishop of Prague)
- 1793–1802 : Vacant

=== From 1800 ===
- 1802–1819 : François-Joseph Hirn
- 1819–1829 : Vacant
- 1829–1834 : Jean Joseph Delplancq
- 1835–1872 : Gaspard-Joseph Labis
- 1873–1880 : Edmond Dumont
- 1881–1897 : Isidore-Joseph du Rousseaux
- 1897–1915 : Carolus Gustavus Walravens
- 1915–1924 : Amédée Crooy
- 1924–1939 : Gaston-Antoine Rasneur
- 1940–1945 : Luigi Delmotte
- 1945–1948 : Etienne Carton de Wiart
- 1948–1977 : Charles-Marie Himmer
- 1977–2002 : Jean Huard
- 2003–2025 : Guy Harpigny
- 2025 - present: Frédéric Rossignol, C.S.Sp.
