= Guy Harpigny =

Belgian Bishop of the Catholic Church (born 1948)

- Bishop Emeritus of Tournai
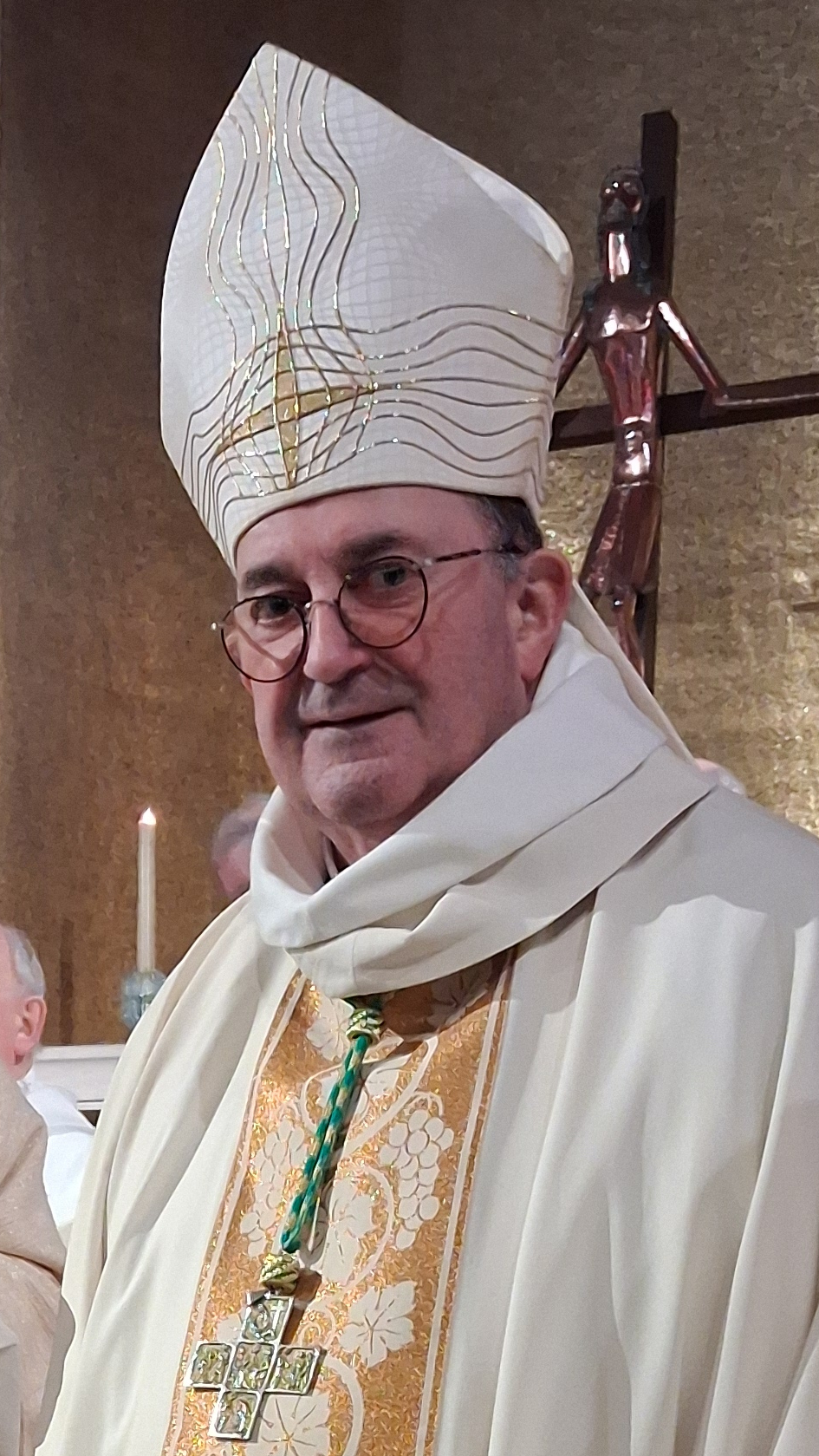
- Guy Harpigny in 2026
- Church: Catholic Church
- Diocese: Diocese of Tournai
- In office: 22 May 2003 – 6 October 2025
- Predecessor: Jean Huard
- Successor: Frédéric Rossignol

Orders
- Ordination: 7 July 1973
- Consecration: 7 September 2003 by Godfried Danneels

Personal details
- Born: 13 April 1948 (age 77) Luttre, Hainaut Province, Belgium
- Coat of arms

Guy Harpigny (born 13 April 1948 in Luttre) is a Belgian Bishop of the Catholic Church.

He was ordained to the priesthood on 7 July 1973. On 22 May 2003 he was appointed Bishop of the Diocese of Tournai by Pope John Paul II and consecrated on 7 September 2003. Harpigny is the Grand Prior of the Belgian Lieutenancy of the Equestrian Order of the Holy Sepulchre of Jerusalem.

On 6 October 2025 Pope Leo XIV accepted Harpigny's resignation. He was succeeded by Frédéric Rossignol.
