= Charles de Croÿ =

Roman Catholic bishop

- Bishop of Tournai
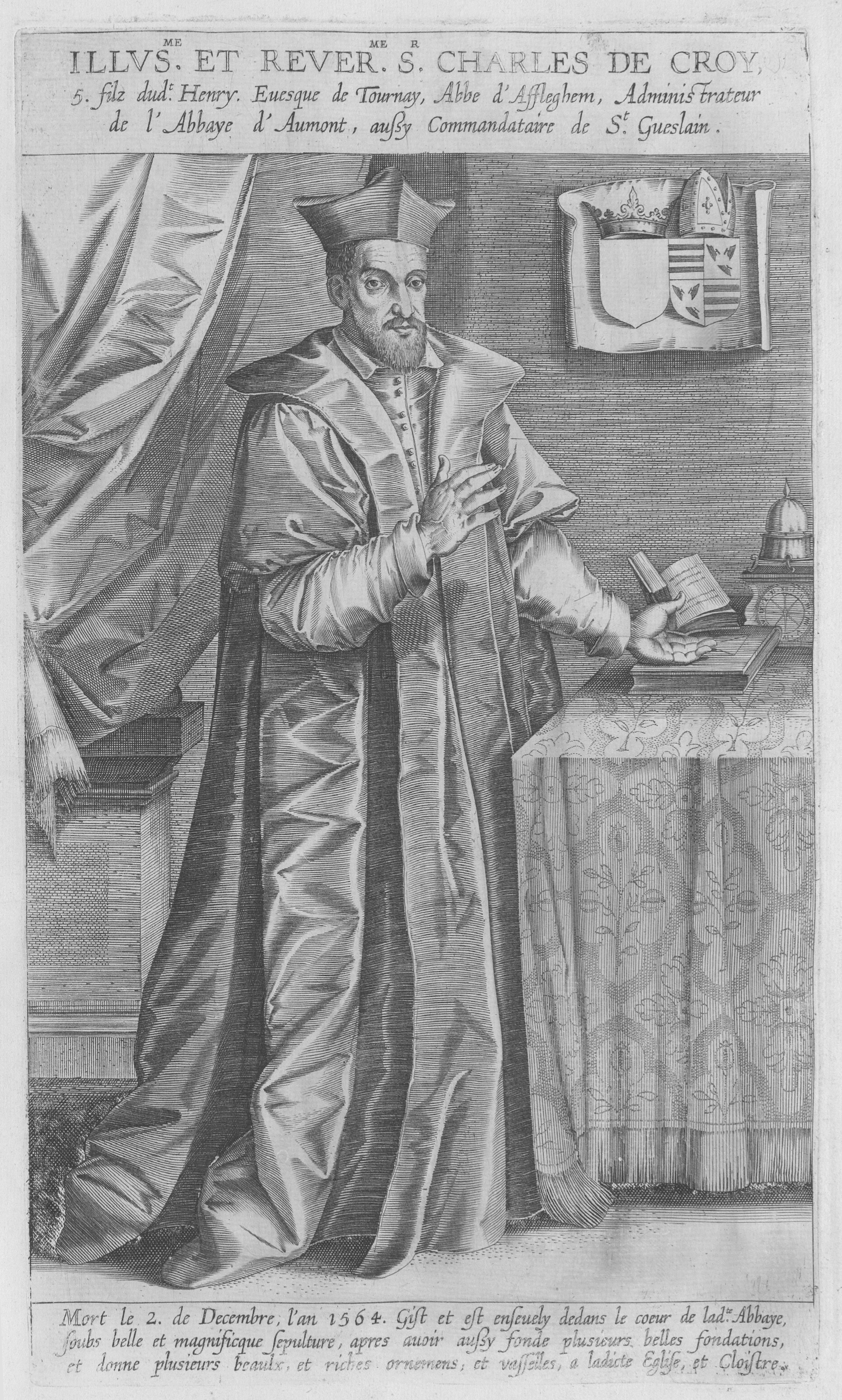
- Installed: 1524
- Term ended: 1564
- Predecessor: Louis Guillard
- Successor: Guibert D'Ongnies

Personal details
- Born: 1506
- Died: 11 December 1564 (aged 57–58)

Charles de Croÿ Prince of Chimay (Dutch: Karel van Croij; 1506 – 11 December 1564) was a bishop of the See of Tournai in present-day Belgium from 1524 until 1564.

Charles was born in 1506 as a member of the House of Croÿ. He was a nephew of William de Croÿ, Lord of Chièvres (1458–1521) and a brother of William de Croÿ, Archbishop of Toledo (1498–1521). He matriculated at the University of Louvain in 1523. Among Charles' teachers were Adrianus Barlandus, Jacobus Latomus, and Johannes Driedo.

A biography of Pierre Cotrel, vicar-general of the Diocese of Tournai from 1497 to 1545, mentions Charles, as do materials describing a château he built in the village of Moorsel in 1546. He was Abbot of Affligem Abbey between 1521–1564.
