= Louis Guillard =

Louis Guillard (1491–1565) was a senior Catholic clergyman from France.

== Life ==
Guillard was born in Paris in 1491. In 1513 he was nominated bishop of Tournai by the king of France, but was unable to take possession of his see due to the English occupation of the city, with Henry VIII nominating Thomas Wolsey in his place. Guillard was finally installed in Tournai in 1519, but was obliged to leave the city again in 1521 when it passed to Habsburg rule. He was thereafter appointed bishop of Chartres in 1524, of Châlon-sur-Saône in 1554, and of Senlis in 1560. He died in Paris in 1565.
