= Tournaisis =

Historical region now in Belgium

location of the Tournaisis

The Tournaisis (or Tournai and the Tournaisis) was a small territory in the Low Countries, Independent during the Middle Ages, it consisted of the city of Tournai (Dutch: Doornik) and the surrounding area, which now forms part of Hainaut Province, in Belgium.

It was one of the great centres of Early Netherlandish (or 'Flemish') painting. Robert Campin settled there and attracted students, including Rogier van der Weyden and Jacques Daret.

It also produced the important Franco-Flemish composers Pierre de la Rue and Marbrianus de Orto.

The Tournaisis was situated between two larger neighbours: the County of Flanders, and the County of Hainaut. Its origins lie in a Roman pagus within the civitas of the Menapii, of which it became the chief city in late Roman times. It had some independence and power in the Middle Ages because it became the seat of the Bishopric of Tournai.

The territory, like that of Flanders, but unlike neighbouring Hainaut, was part of early medieval West Francia, which evolved into France. However, this rule was not always effective. It came under French rule during the reign of Philip IV of France, and remained under French control until it was conquered by Emperor Charles V in 1521. It remained part of the Habsburg Netherlands until 1789, eventually becoming part of modern Belgium.

The Tournaisis was considered part of the Seventeen Provinces.

The following is a chronological list of monarchs, governors, and supreme authorities who held sovereign or suzerain power over the city of Tournai and the surrounding territory of the **Tournaisis**.

From 1187 until its final integration into the Habsburg Netherlands in 1521, Tournai and the Tournaisis functioned as a highly autonomous, sovereign royal city-republic holding the status of a royal bailiwick (French: bailliage royal) held directly under the suzerainty of the French Crown.

== Counts of Flanders (862–1187) ==
During the Early Middle Ages, the Tournaisis was historically part of the County of Flanders, though local administration was heavily contested by the Bishop of Tournai.

Ruler	Reign	Notes
Baldwin I Iron Arm	862–879	First hereditary Count of Flanders; consolidated power over the region.
Baldwin II the Bald	879–918	Son of Baldwin I; fortified Tournai against Viking raids.
Arnulf I the Great	918–965	Expanded Flemish influence southward into the Cambrésis and Tournaisis.
Baldwin IV the Bearded	988–1035	Received Valenciennes and parts of Zeeland as Imperial fiefs, securing the eastern borders.
Baldwin V the Pious	1035–1067	Served as regent of France; heavily expanded urban privileges across Flanders.
Robert I the Frisian	1071–1093	Seized the county from his nephew; favored the growing urban centers.
Charles I the Good	1119–1127	Known for his progressive governance and charity; murdered in Bruges.
Thierry of Alsace	1128–1168	Secured the Flemish throne after a bitter civil war with William Clito.
Philip of Alsace	1168–1187	Last Count of Flanders to hold direct secular authority over Tournai before it was severed by the French Crown.

== Royal City-Republic under the French Crown (1187–1513) ==
In 1187, King Philip II Augustus separated Tournai from the County of Flanders and granted the city a royal communal charter. The Tournaisis became a sovereign enclave held directly under the Kings of France, governed locally by a council of aldermen and a royal bailiff.

Sovereign	Period	Notes
Philip II Augustus	1187–1223	Granted Tournai its foundational royal charter, creating the autonomous commune.
Louis VIII the Lion	1223–1226	Continued the policy of protecting the royal enclave against Flemish encroachments.
Louis IX the Saint	1226–1270	Standardized royal administration; heavily fortified the urban defenses.
Philip III the Bold	1270–1285	Maintained the alliance between the wealthy urban patriciate and the crown.
Philip IV the Fair	1285–1314	Formally established the royal bailiwick (bailliage) of the Tournaisis to institutionalize French control.
Louis X the Quarrelsome	1314–1316	Brief reign marked by regional tensions with the surrounding Flemish lands.
Philip V the Tall	1316–1322	Confirmed and expanded the judicial and commercial privileges of the city.
Charles IV the Fair	1322–1328	Last monarch of the direct House of Capet.
Philip VI	1328–1350	First monarch of the House of Valois; successfully defended Tournai during the English siege of 1340.
John II the Good	1350–1364	Granted economic tax reliefs to the Tournaisis during the early phases of the Hundred Years' War.
Charles V the Wise	1364–1380	Strengthened the strategic military infrastructure along the Scheldt river.
Charles VI the Mad	1380–1422	Reign marked by internal French civil war, but Tournai remained fiercely loyal to the Crown.
Charles VII	1422–1461	Tournai remained an isolated island of Valois loyalty, entirely surrounded by hostile Burgundian territories. Commended by Joan of Arc for its unwavering support.
Louis XI	1461–1483	Used Tournai as a vital forward base for his covert and overt geopolitical wars against Charles the Bold.
Charles VIII	1483–1498	Maintained the traditional liberties and autonomous self-governance of the Consaux.
Louis XII	1498–1513	Last French monarch of this period; lost the city following an English invasion during the War of the League of Cambrai.

== English Occupation (1513–1519) ==
Following a successful siege in 1513, King Henry VIII captured Tournai. It became the only city in the territory of modern-day Belgium to be directly ruled by the Kingdom of England, even receiving representation in the English Parliament.

Sovereign	Period	Notes
Henry VIII	1513–1519	Captured the city personally. Constructed a massive, state-of-the-art citadel in Tournai (the Henry VIII Tower still stands).

== Brief French Restoration (1519–1521) ==
Under the terms of the Treaty of London (1518), France purchased the city back from the English Crown for 600,000 crowns.

Sovereign	Period	Notes
Francis I	1519–1521	Briefly restored French royal administration before losing the city permanently to the Holy Roman Emperor.

== Annexation to the Habsburg Netherlands (1521–1581) ==
In late 1521, the Imperial armies of Charles V captured Tournai after a siege. By the Treaty of Madrid (1526) and the Pragmatic Sanction of 1549, French suzerainty was formally renounced, and the Tournaisis was permanently integrated into the Seventeen Provinces of the Habsburg Netherlands.

Sovereign	Period	Notes
Charles V (Charles I of Spain)	1521–1555	Absorbed the city-republic into the Burgundian Circle; completely reorganized its civic administration.
Philip II	1555–1581	Sovereign during the outbreak of the Eighty Years' War. Tournai became a radical bastion of Calvinism until it was besieged and captured by Alexander Farnese in 1581, ending its sovereign/autonomous era.

== See also ==
- History of Tournai
- Seventeen Provinces
- Count of Flanders
