= Tournai Cathedral =

Catholic cathedral in Tournai, Belgium

Our Lady of Tournai Notre-Dame de Tournai Onze-Lieve-Vrouw van Doornik Noter-Danme ed Tornai
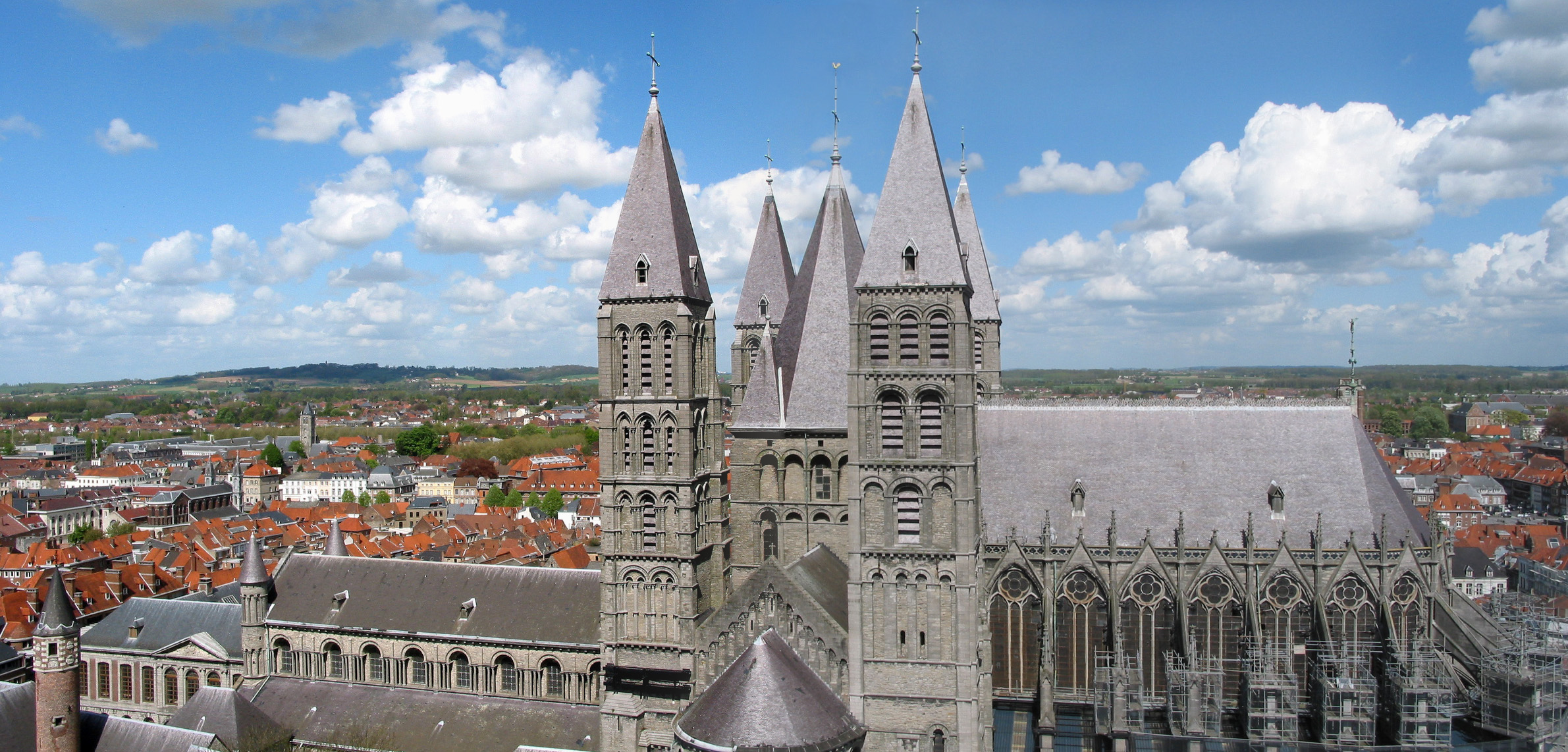
- View of the five Romanesque towers of the Cathedral of Tournai (12th century)

Religion
- Affiliation: Roman Catholic
- Diocese: Diocese of Tournai
- Ecclesiastical or organisational status: Cathedral
- Leadership: Bishop Guy Harpigny

Location
- Location: Tournai, Hainaut, Belgium
- Interactive map of Our Lady of Tournai; Notre-Dame de Tournai; Onze-Lieve-Vrouw van Doornik; Noter-Danme ed Tornai
- Coordinates: 50°36′23.58″N 3°23′19.89″E

Architecture
- Architects: Building: unknown Sacristy: G. Hersecap; Holy Spirit chapel: Simon Vollant
- Type: Church
- Style: Romanesque, Gothic, French Baroque
- Groundbreaking: Nave: 1140 and 1171; Transepts: 1199–1213; Transept vaults: 1243–1255; Gothic choir: 1243–1255; Sacristy: 1676; Holy Spirit chapel: 1680
- Completed: 1700

Specifications
- Direction of façade: NW
- Length: 134 metres (440 ft)
- Width: 60 metres (200 ft)
- Width (nave): 20 metres (66 ft)
- Height (max): 83 metres (272 ft)
- Spire: 5 (7 planned)
- Spire height: 83 metres (272 ft)
- UNESCO World Heritage Site
- Official name: Notre-Dame Cathedral in Tournai
- Type: Cultural
- Criteria: ii, iv
- Designated: 2000
- Reference no.: 1009
- State Party: Belgium
- Region: Europe and North America
- Session: 24th

Website
- www.cathedrale-tournai.be

The Cathedral of Our Lady (French: Notre-Dame de Tournai; Dutch: Onze-Lieve-Vrouw van Doornik; Picard: Noter-Danme ed Tornai), or Tournai Cathedral, is a Roman Catholic cathedral, see of the Diocese of Tournai in Tournai, Belgium. It has been classified both as a Wallonia major heritage site since 1936 and as a World Heritage Site since 2000.

== History ==
=== Early history ===
There was a diocese centered at Tournai from the late 6th century and this structure of local blue-gray stone occupies rising ground near the south bank of the Scheldt, which divides the city of Tournai into two roughly equal parts. Begun in the 12th century on even older foundations, the building combines the work of three design periods with striking effect, the heavy and severe character of the Romanesque nave contrasting remarkably with the transitional work of the transept and the fully developed Gothic of the choir. The transept is the most distinctive part of the building, with its cluster of five bell towers and apsidal (semicircular) ends.

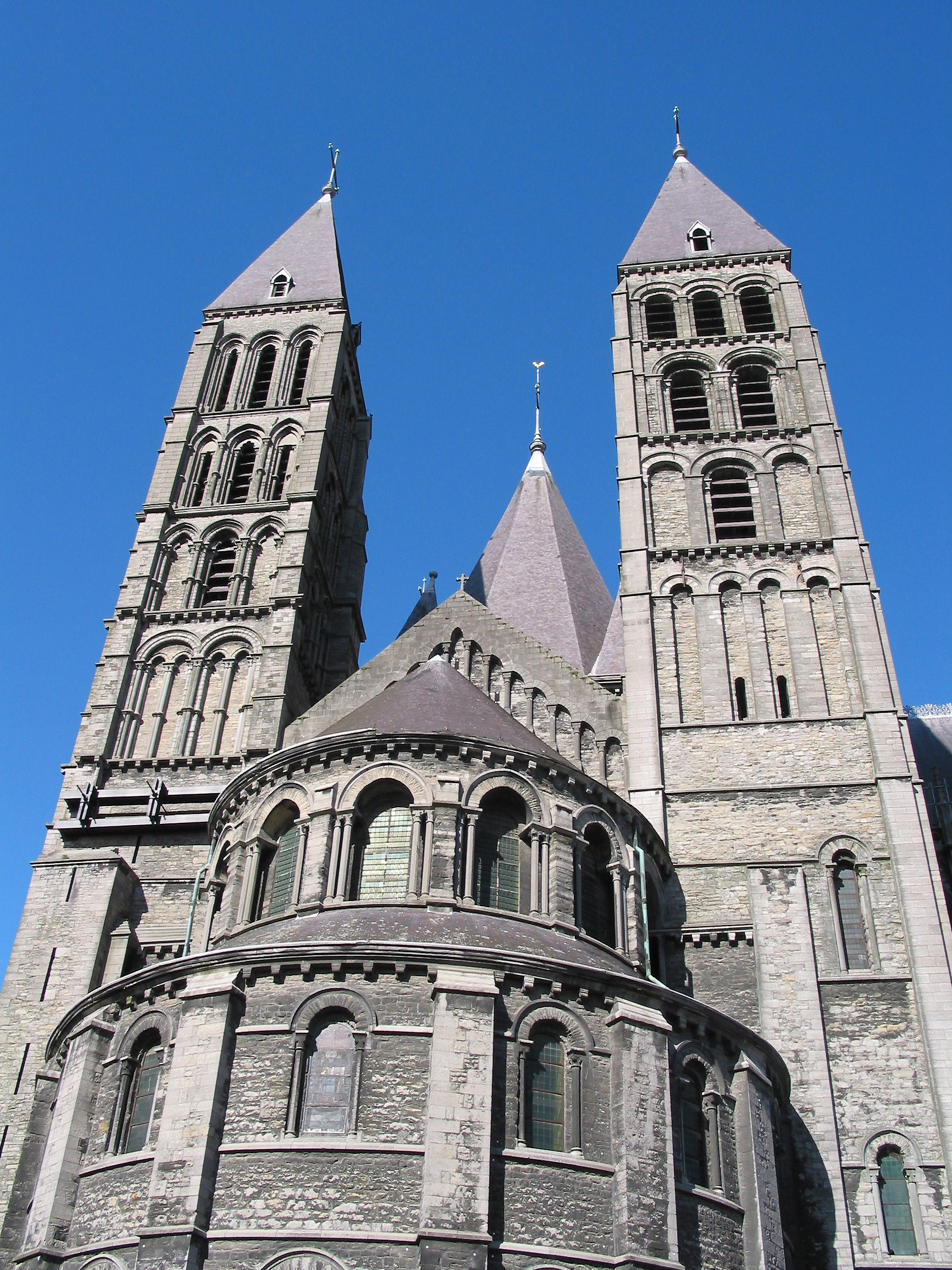
Southern transept and towers

The nave belongs mostly to the first third of the 12th century. Prefiguring the Early Gothic style, it has a second-tier gallery between the ground-floor arcade and the triforium. Pilasters between the round-arched windows in the clerestory help support the 18th-century vaulting that replaced the original ceiling, which was of wood, and flat.

The transept arms, built in about the mid-12th century, have apsidal ends, a feature borrowed in all probability from certain Rhenish churches, and which would appear to have made its influence felt in the north-east of France, as at Noyon and Soissons. The square towers that flank the transept arms reach a height of 83 metres (272 ft). They vary in detail, some of the arcade work with which they are enriched being in the round-arched and some in the pointed style.

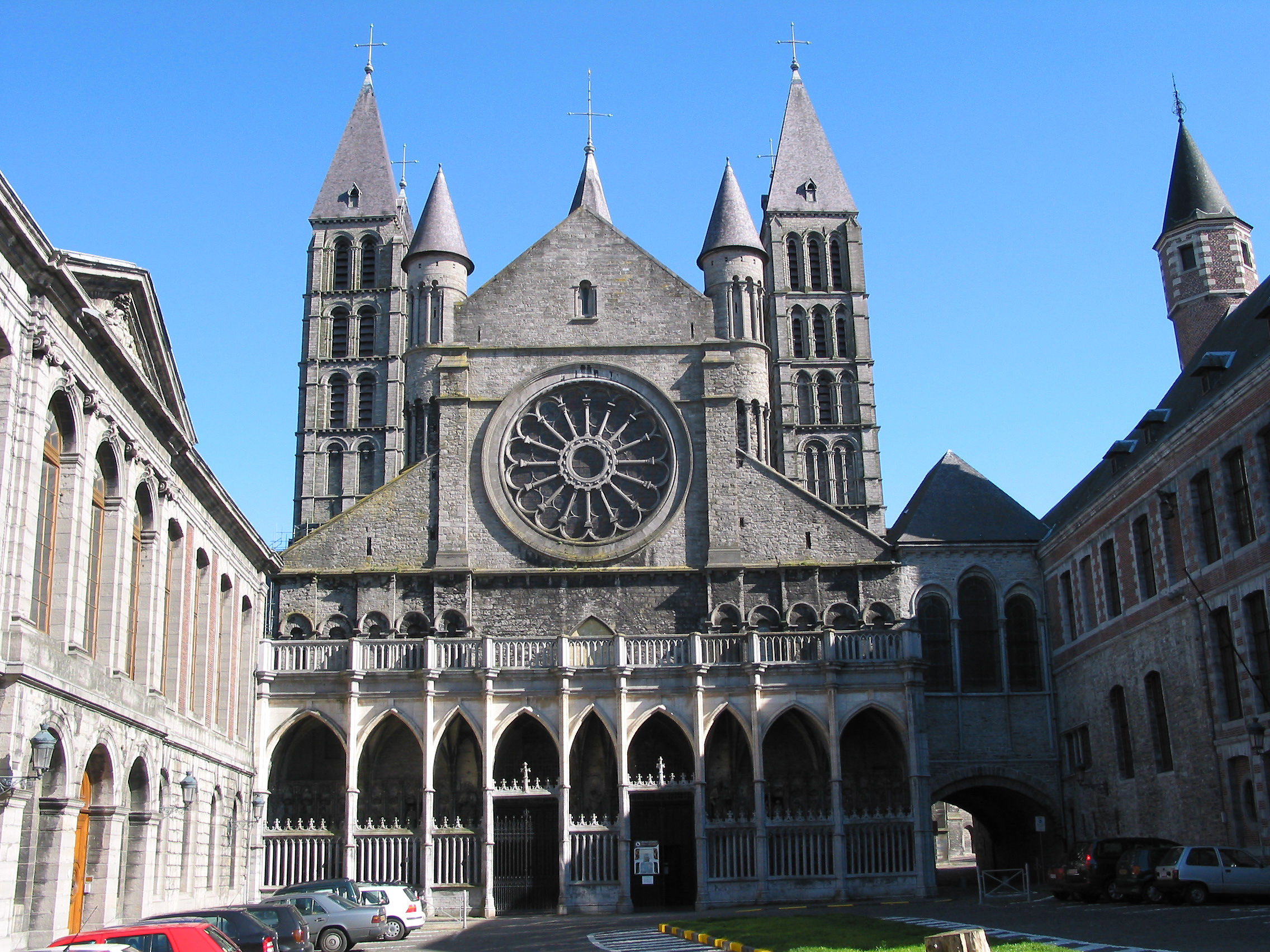
West portico

Bishop Gautier de Marvis had the earlier Romanesque choir demolished in the 13th century, in order to replace it with a Gothic choir of much grander dimensions, inspired by the likes of Amiens Cathedral. The construction of the new choir began in 1242, and ended in 1255. The rest of the cathedral was supposed to be rebuilt in the same style as the choir, but this was never attempted, the only later additions being the western porch, and a large Gothic chapel which was built alongside one of the side aisles, whose original walls and windows disappeared in the process.

The rood screen is a Renaissance masterpiece by Flemish sculptor Cornelis Floris and dates from 1573.

=== Damage and restoration ===
The cathedral was damaged by a severe tornado 14 August 1999. Assessment of the damage revealed underlying structural problems and the cathedral has been undergoing extensive repairs and archaeological investigation ever since. The Brunin Tower was stabilised in 2003.

In recognition of Tournai cathedral's cultural value, UNESCO designated the building a World Heritage Site in 2000.

== Specifications ==
- Total length: 134 metres (440 ft)

Towers

- Number: 5
- Height: 83 metres (272 ft)

Nave

- Height: 26 metres (85 ft)
- Length: 48 metres (157 ft)
- Width : 20 metres (66 ft)

Choir

- Height outside: 58 metres (190 ft)
- Height inside: 47 metres (154 ft)
- Width: 36 metres (118 ft)

Transept

- Height: 48 metres (157 ft)
- Length: 66.5 metres (218 ft)
- Width : 14 metres (46 ft)

== Bells ==
Tournai Cathedral has five bells: Marc, Marie-Nicolas, Marie-Étienne, Marie-Gasparine (also known as Marie-Pontoise by Tournaisians) and Catherine. Marie-Gasparine and Marie-Étienne are considered bourdon bells due to their deep notes. Marie-Gasparine is the largest of the five bells, it was cast in 1843 and weighs 9 tons.

== Burials ==
- Eleutherius of Tournai
- Nicolas Gombert
- Adolf, Duke of Guelders

== Gallery ==
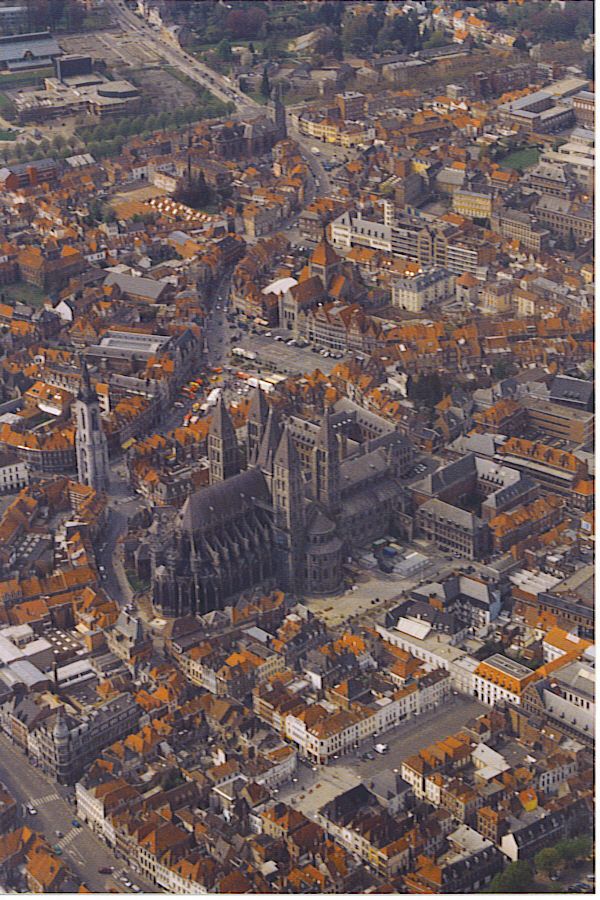
Aerial view

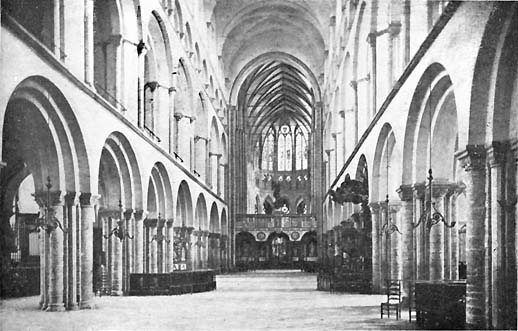
Nave, facing toward choir

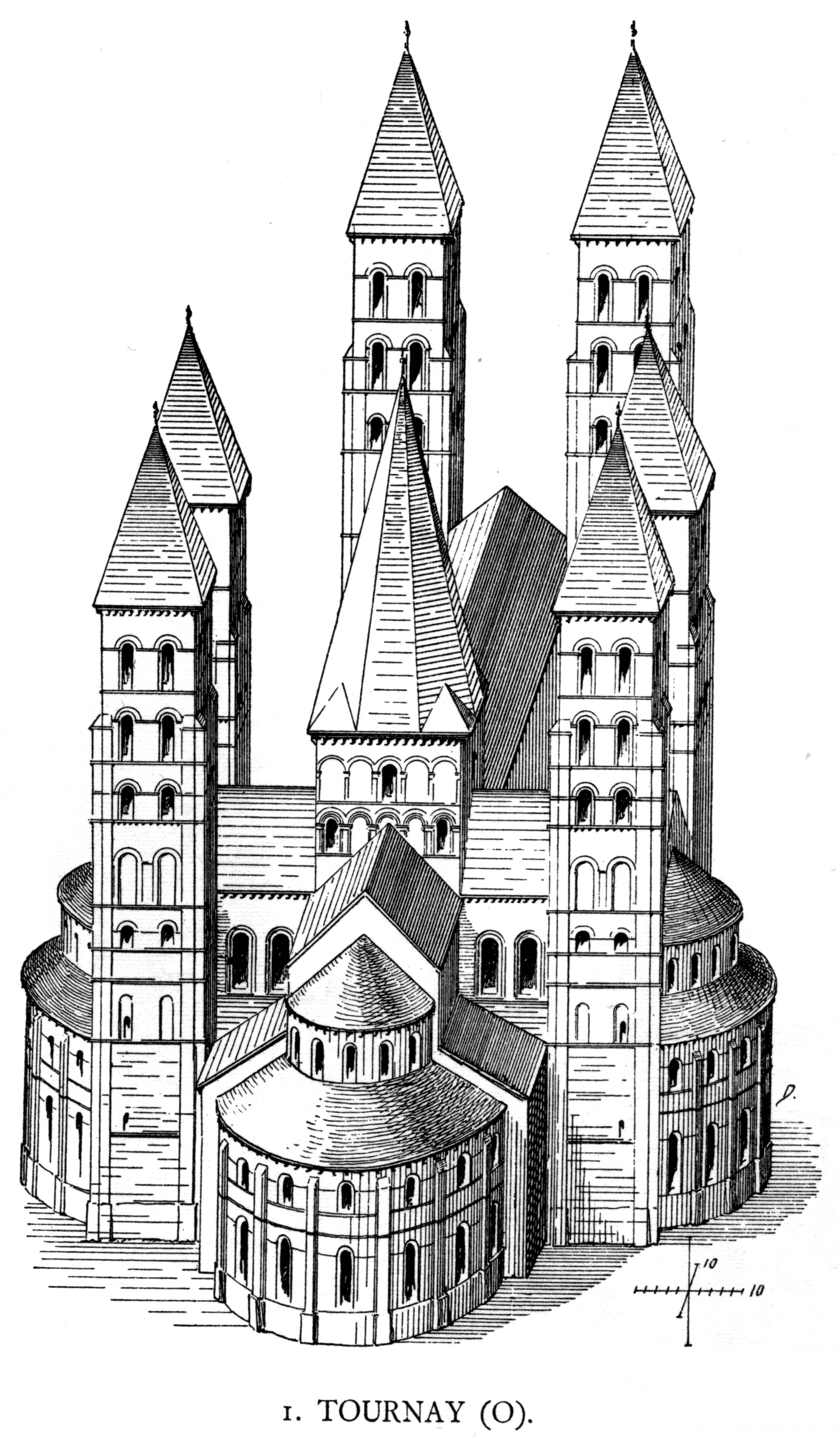
Reconstruction showing the original Romanesque choir (front) and two never-built towers (back)

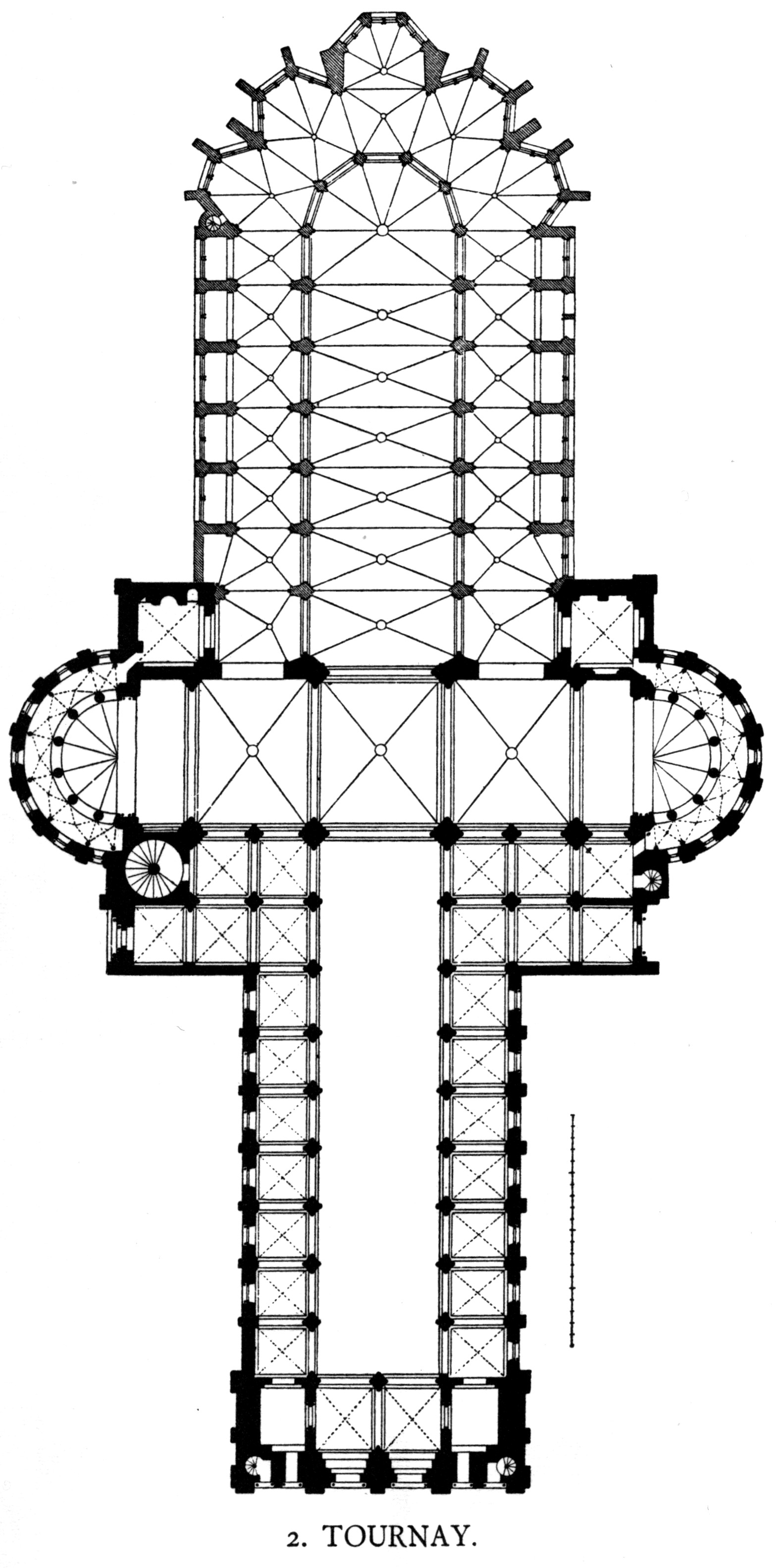
Floor plan

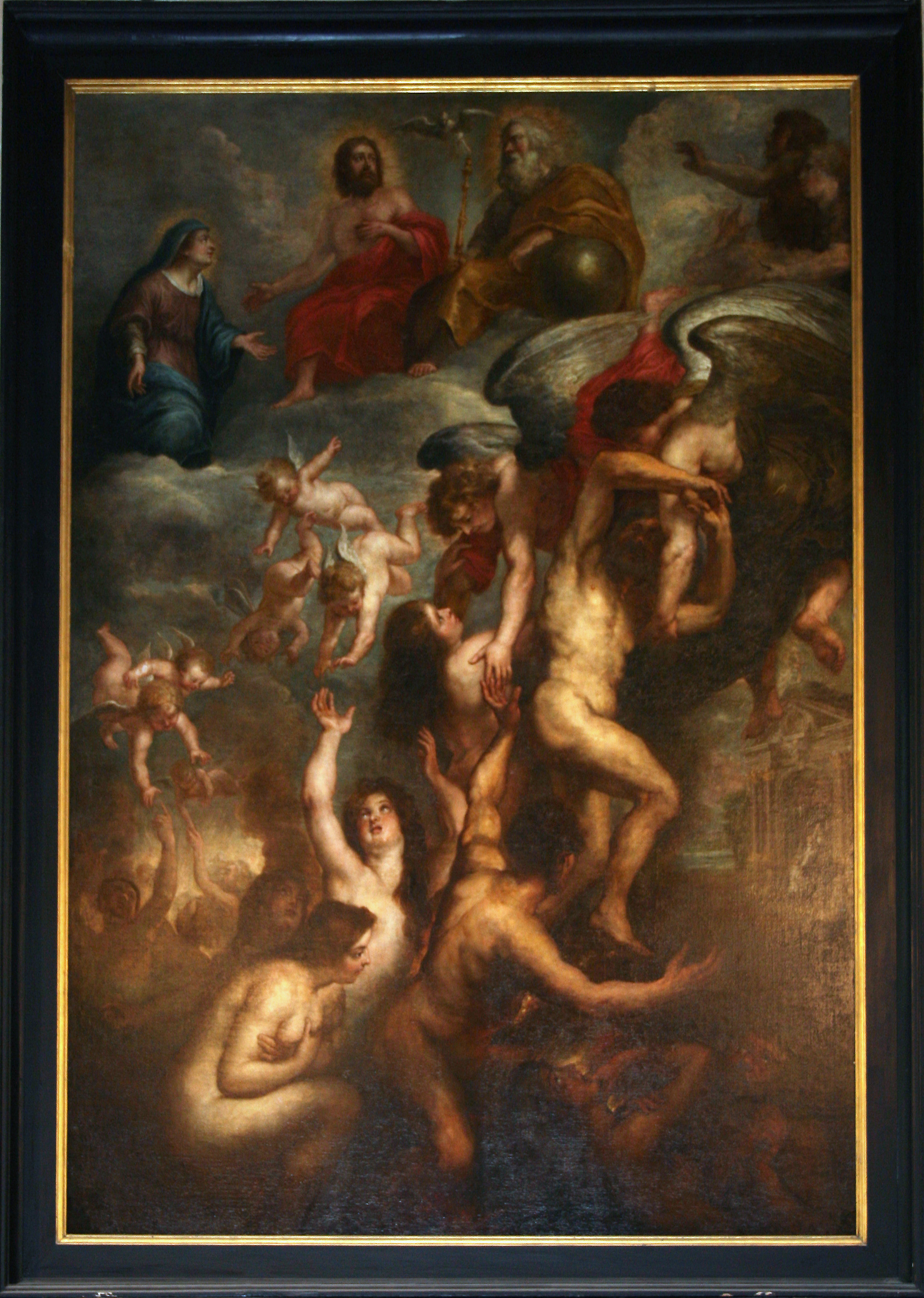
The issue of souls in purgatory (Rubens, c. 1635)

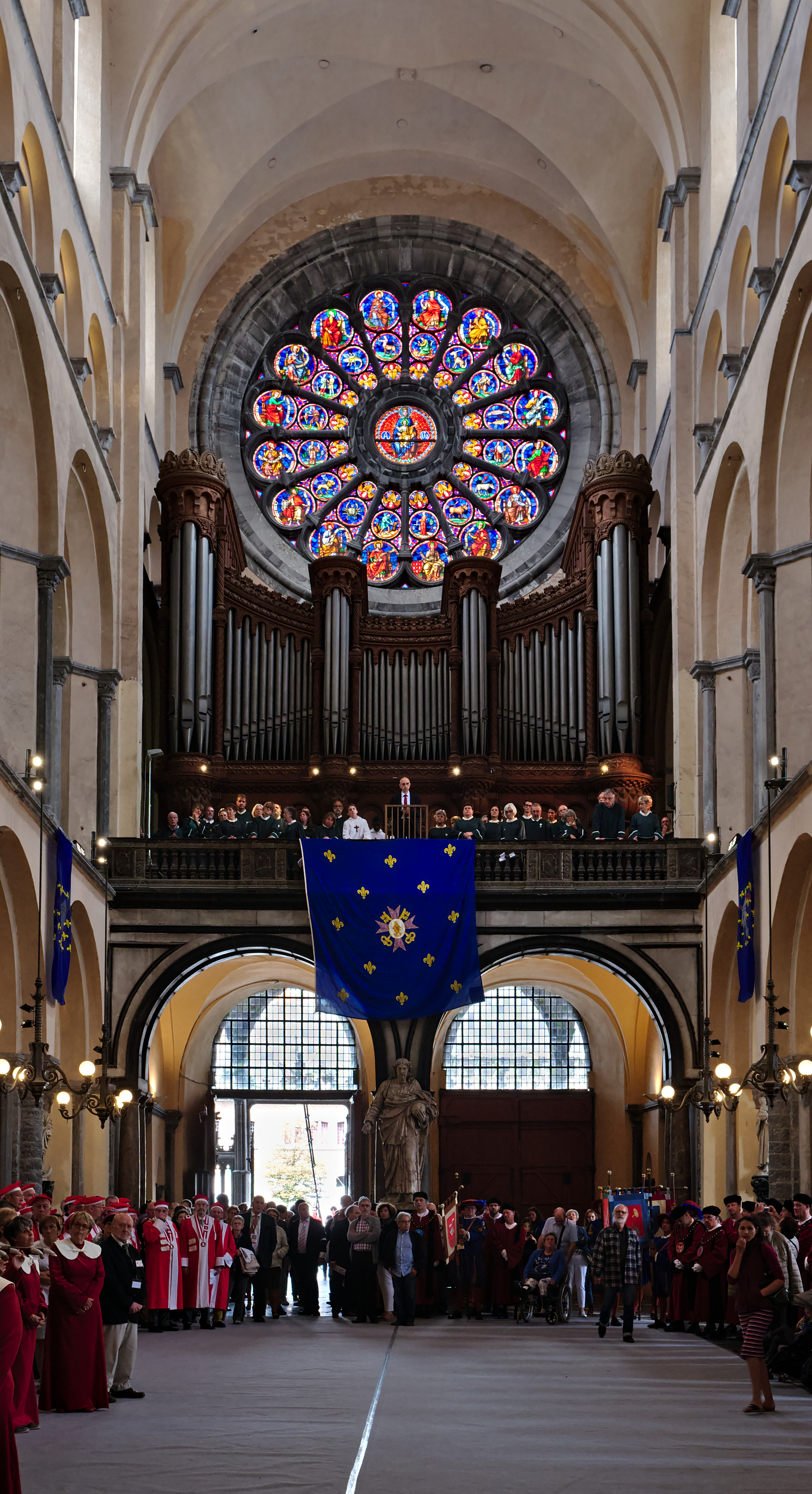
Rose window (Benvignat and Capronier, 19th century) and pipe organ (Ducroquet, 1854)

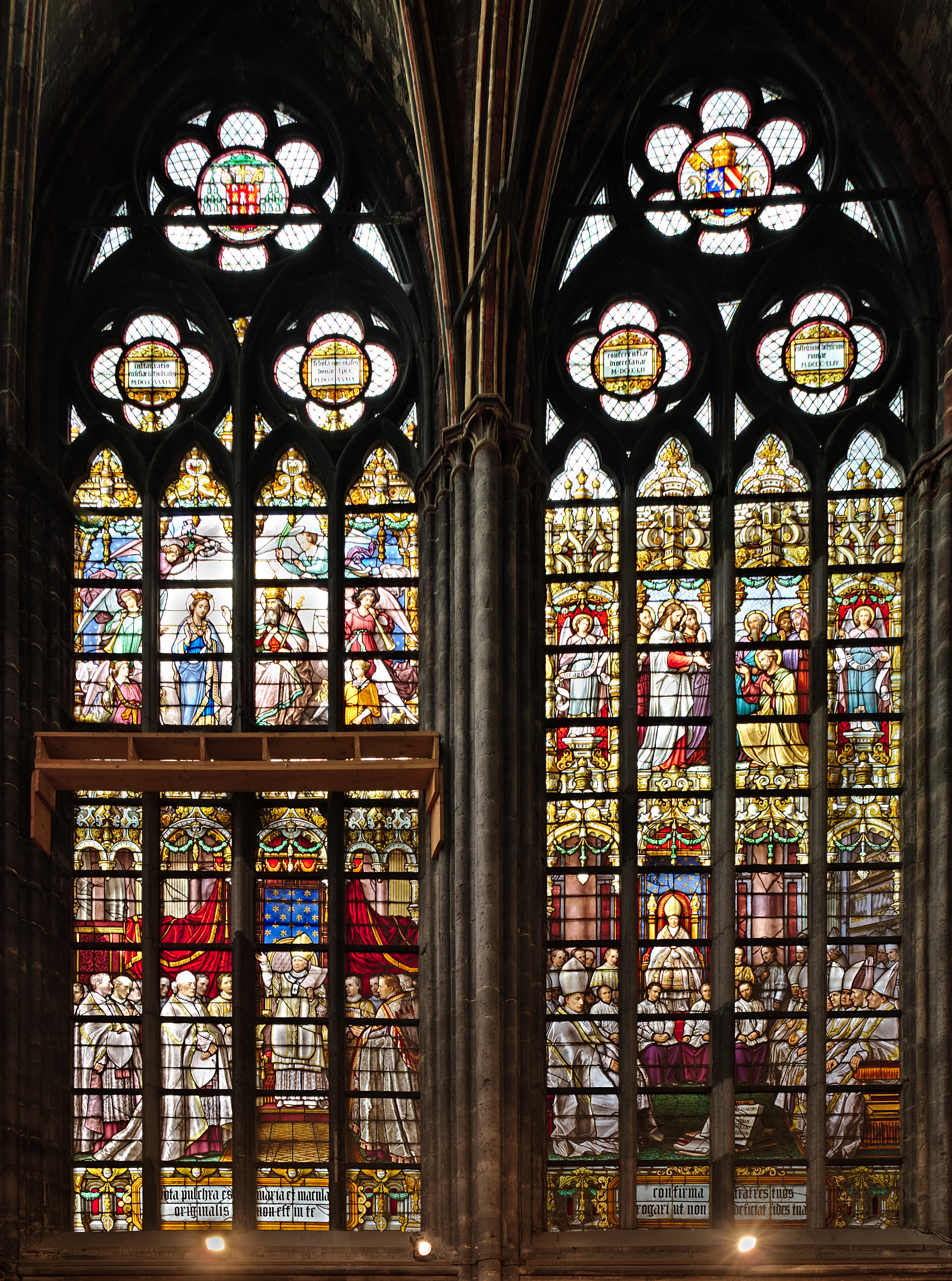
Stained-glass windows

== See also ==
- Roman Catholic Marian churches
- List of tallest structures built before the 20th century
