= Crucifixion and Last Judgement diptych =

Two panel paintings attributed to Jan van Eyck

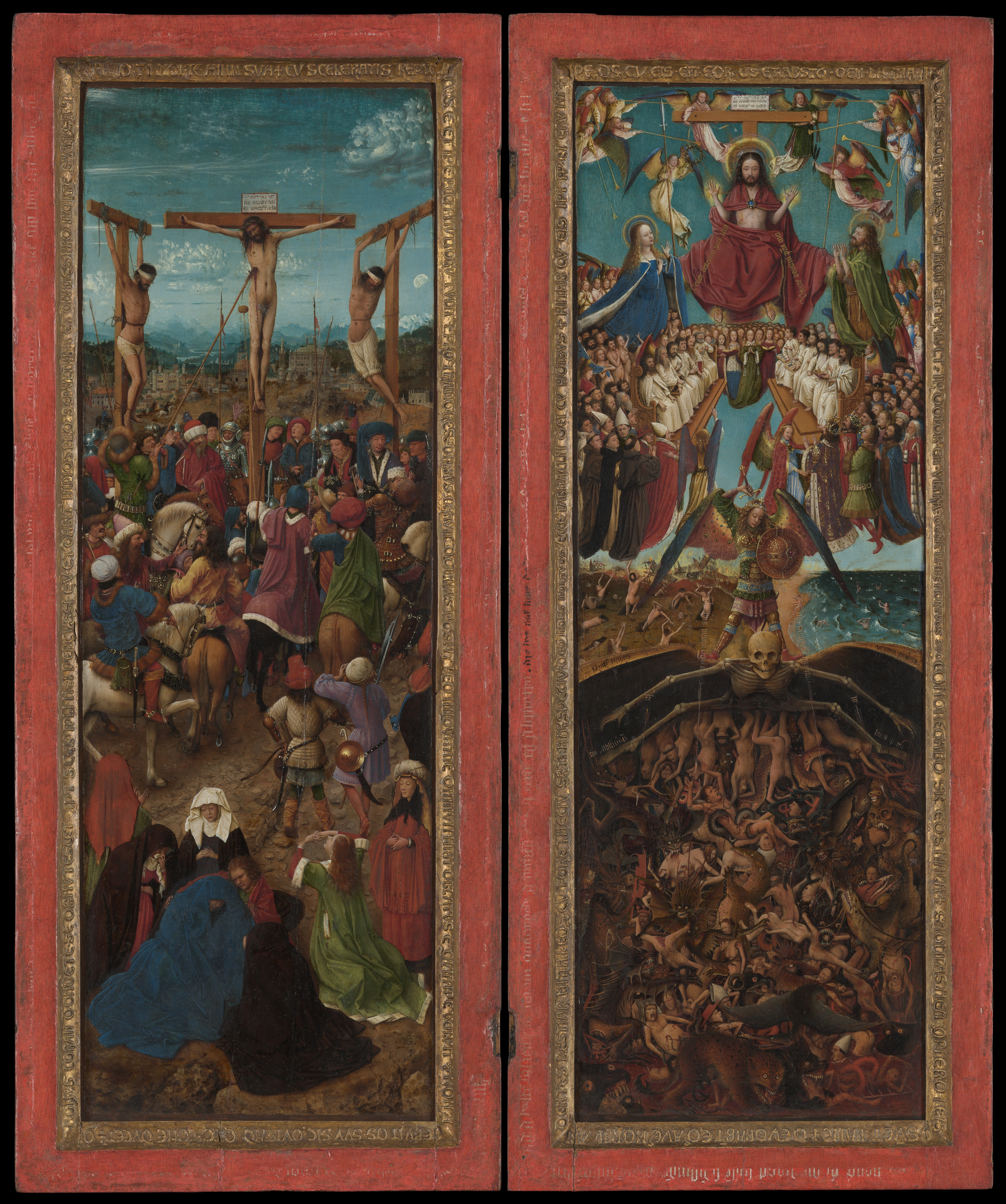
- Artist: Jan van Eyck
- Year: c. 1436–1438
- Type: Oil on panel transferred to canvas
- Dimensions: Each panel: 56.5 cm × 19.7 cm (22.2 in × 7.8 in)
- Location: Metropolitan Museum of Art, New York City

The Crucifixion and Last Judgement diptych (or Diptych with Calvary and Last Judgement) consists of two small painted panels attributed to the Early Netherlandish artist Jan van Eyck, with areas finished by unidentified followers or members of his workshop. This diptych is one of the early oil-on-panel masterpieces of the Northern Renaissance, renowned for its unusually complex and highly detailed iconography, and for the technical skill evident in its completion. It was executed in a miniature format; the panels are just 56.5 cm (22.2 in) high by 19.7 cm (7.8 in) wide. The diptych was probably commissioned for private devotion.

The left-hand wing depicts the Crucifixion. It shows Christ's followers grieving in the foreground, soldiers and spectators milling about in the mid-ground and a portrayal of three crucified bodies in the upper-ground. The scene is framed against an expansive and foreboding sky with a view of Jerusalem in the distance. The right-hand wing portrays scenes associated with the Last Judgement: a hellscape at its base, the resurrected awaiting judgement in the centre-ground, and a representation of Christ in Majesty flanked by a Great Deësis of saints, apostles, clergy, virgins and nobility in the upper section. Portions of the work contain Greek, Latin and Hebrew inscriptions. The original gilt frames contain Biblical passages in Latin drawn from the books of Isaiah, Deuteronomy and Revelation. According to a date written in Russian on their reverse, the panels were transferred to canvas supports in 1867.

The earliest surviving mention of the work appears in 1841, when scholars believed the two panels were wings of a lost triptych. The Metropolitan Museum of Art acquired the diptych in 1933. At that time, the work was attributed to Jan's brother Hubert because key areas formally resembled pages of the Turin-Milan Hours, which were then believed to be of Hubert's hand. On the evidence of technique and the style of dress of the figures, the majority of scholars believe the panels are late works by Jan van Eyck, executed in the early 1430s and finished after his death. Other art historians hold that van Eyck painted the panels around the early 1420s and attribute the weaker passages to a younger van Eyck's relative inexperience.

== Format and technique ==
Along with Robert Campin and later Rogier van der Weyden, Van Eyck revolutionised the approach towards naturalism and realism in Northern European painting during the early to mid 15th century. He was the first to manipulate oils to give the close detailing that infused his figures with the high degree of realism and complexity of emotion seen in this diptych. He coupled this with a mastery of glaze to create luminous surfaces with a deep perspective—most noticeable in the upper portion of the Crucifixion panel—which had not been achieved before.

In the 1420s and 1430s, when oil and panel painting were still in their infancy, vertical formats were often used for depictions of the Last Judgement, because the narrow framing particularly suited a hierarchical presentation of heaven, earth and hell. By contrast, depictions of the Crucifixion were usually presented in a horizontal format. To fit such expansive and highly detailed representations onto two equally small and narrow wings, van Eyck was forced to make a number of innovations, redesigning many elements of the Crucifixion panel to match the vertical and condensed presentation of the Judgement narrative. The result is a panel with the crosses rising high into the sky, an unusually packed crowd scene in the mid-ground, and the moving spectacle of the mourners in the foreground, all rendered in a continuous slope from bottom to top in the style of medieval tapestries. Art historian Otto Pächt says it "is the whole world in one painting, an Orbis Pictus".

In the Crucifixion panel, van Eyck follows the early 14th-century tradition of presenting the biblical episodes using a narrative technique. According to art historian Jeffrey Chipps Smith, the episodes appear as "simultaneous, not sequential" events. Van Eyck condenses key episodes from the gospels into a single composition, each placed so as to draw the viewer's eye upward in a logical sequence. This device allowed van Eyck to create a greater illusion of depth with more complex and unusual spatial arrangements. In the Crucifixion panel, he uses different indicators to show the relative closeness of particular groupings of figures to Jesus. Given the size of the mourners in the foreground relative to the crucified figures, the soldiers and spectators gathered in the mid-ground are far larger than a strict adherence to perspective would allow. In the Last Judgement the damned are placed in hell in the lower mid-ground while the saints and angels are positioned higher in the upper foreground. Pächt writes of this panel that the scene is "assimilated into a single spatial cosmos", with the archangel acting as a divider in the pictorial space between heaven and hell.

Art historians are unsure as to whether the panels were meant to be a diptych or a triptych. They may have formed the outer wings of a triptych, with a since-lost panel representing the Adoration of the Magi at the centre, or, as the German art historian J.D. Passavant speculated in 1841, the lost centre panel may have been a Nativity. It is now thought unlikely that a lost panel could be the postulated original companion to the outer wings; such a coupling would have been very odd to painters of the 1420s and 1430s. It has also been proposed that a central piece was added later, or as Albert Châtelet writes, the central panel may have been stolen. Art historian Erwin Panofsky believed the Crucifixion and Last Judgement panels were intended as a diptych. He argued that it would have been unusual for mere outer wings to have been given the "sumptuous treatment" afforded these two panels. This approach is reminiscent of the medieval reliquaries. Others have observed that triptychs were usually much larger works intended for public display, and they tended towards gilded and heavily inscribed frames; typically only the central panel would have been as lavishly decorated as these panels. Contemporary diptychs, in contrast, were usually produced for private devotion and were typically ungilded. There is no documentary evidence for an original central panel, however, and technical examination suggests the two works were intended as wings of a diptych, then an emerging format. Pächt believes there is not enough evidence to determine whether a third panel existed.

The diptych is notable for the first known naturalistic depiction of the Moon's features. It had previously been typical to show the Moon as a blank disk or crescent, or with a human face. Here, the waning gibbous Moon is shown as it would appear in the mid-morning western sky in Judea, including major features such as the Mare Imbrium and the Oceanus Procellarum.

== The diptych ==
=== Crucifixion panel ===
The Crucifixion panel comprises three horizontal planes, each representing different moments from the Passion. The upper third shows the crucifixion before a view of Jerusalem; the lower two thirds detail the crowds and Jesus' followers at Golgotha (Place of the Skull). Located outside the city walls amongst rock tombs and gardens, in the first century Golgotha was Jerusalem's place of execution, and the visible patches of hill highlight the area's "stony, forbidding, and lifeless" nature. The atmosphere of bleakness is reinforced by the random figures in the upper ground that scramble for a better view. The gospels tell of Jesus' followers and relatives, as well as his prosecutors and assorted spectators, attending the crucifixion at Golgotha. In van Eyck's panel the former are represented in the foreground, while the latter, including High Priests and Temple Elders, are shown in the mid-ground.

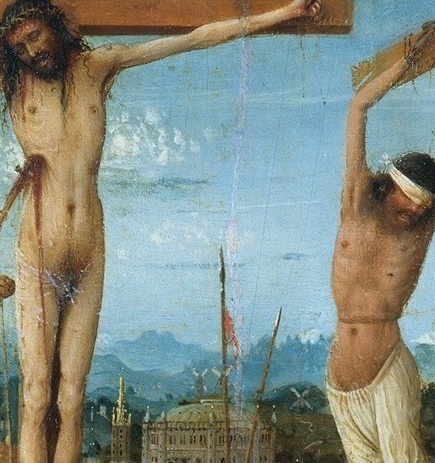
Death of Christ on the cross. Typically, a crucifixion victim's legs were broken to hasten death. According to the Gospel of John, when soldiers came to break Jesus' legs, they found him already dead. A soldier pierced his side with a lance; blood and water poured from the wound.

The centre foreground shows a group of five mourners, with three other figures set to the right and left. In the center group, John the Evangelist supports the Virgin Mary, surrounded by three women. Mary's dramatic swoon in grief pushes her forward in the pictorial space, and according to Smith, places her "closest to the viewer's presumed position". Dressed in an enveloping blue robe that hides most of her face, she collapses and is caught by John, who supports her by her arms. Mary Magdalene kneels to the right, dressed in a white-trimmed green robe and red sleeves. Raising her arms aloft, she clenches her fingers in a distraught, agonised manner. She is the only figure from this group shown to look directly at Christ and serves as one of the key painterly devices to direct the viewer's gaze upwards towards the crosses. The fourth and fifth mourners have been identified as prophesying sibyls, and stand to the far left and right of the centre group. The sibyl to the left faces the cross with her back to the viewer while the turbaned mourner on the right faces the group and is either the Erythraean or the Cumaean sibyl, both of whom are attributed in Christian tradition with warning the occupying Romans of the cult of redemption that would develop around Christ's death and resurrection. She has an almost indifferent expression that has been interpreted both as satisfaction at seeing her prophesies realised, and as compassionate contemplation of the other women's grief.

The mid-ground shows a crowd scene above the group of mourners, separated by two soldiers who stand between the two groupings. The mourners from the foreground are reflected in the shield carried on the hip of the lance-bearing Roman soldier who leans on the man to his right wearing a red turban. Smith believes this serves to highlight the mourners' emotional and physical separation from the assorted figures gathered in the mid-ground. Art historian Adam Labuda sees these two figures, positioned full-length between the chief mourners and mid-ground spectators, as a pictorial device that along with the Magdalene's upward gaze draws viewers' eyes upwards through the panel's dramatic sequence.

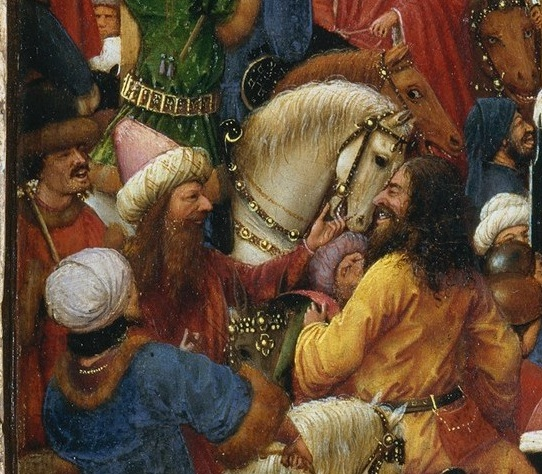
The taunting of the condemned. At the time there were many enemies of the Temple and Jesus was seen by the Jewish hierarchy merely as the charismatic successor to John the Baptist. Although he became enough of a legitimate threat to be executed, he was ultimately viewed by the elders as just another agitating pseudo-prophet.

Van Eyck's depiction lays particular emphasis on the brutishness and indifference of the crowd witnessing Christ's suffering. They comprise a mixture of Roman legionaries, judges and various hangers-on arriving to witness the spectacle. A number are dressed in rich, brightly coloured clothes, a mixture of oriental and northern European styles, while several are mounted on horseback. Some openly jeer and taunt the condemned, others gape stupefied at "just another" execution, while others talk amongst themselves. The exception is the armoured centurion, seated on a white horse at the extreme right edge of the panel, who looks up at Christ, arms spread wide, head thrown back, at "the very moment of his illumination" in recognition of Christ's divinity. The horsemen closely resemble both the Soldiers of Christ and Righteous Judges from the lower inner panels of van Eyck's c. 1432 Ghent Altarpiece. Art historian Till-Holger Borchert observes that these figures are given "greater dynamism by being seen in rear rather than profile view", and that this vantage point draws the observer's eye upwards towards the mid-ground and the crucifixion.

Van Eyck extends the height of the crosses to an unrealistic degree to allow the crucifixion to dominate the upper third of the panel. Christ faces the viewer directly, while the crosses of the two thieves are set at angles to either side. The thieves are each bound with cords of rope rather than nails. The body of the thief to the right—the repentant thief mentioned in the Gospel of Luke—is lifeless. The "bad" thief to his left is dying twisted in pain, and according to art historian James W.H. Weale, depicted as "struggling desperately, but in vain". Both men's hands have turned black from a lack of blood flow. A placard prepared by Pilate or Roman soldiers placed above Jesus' head reads "Jesus of Nazareth, King of the Jews" in Hebrew, Latin and Greek.

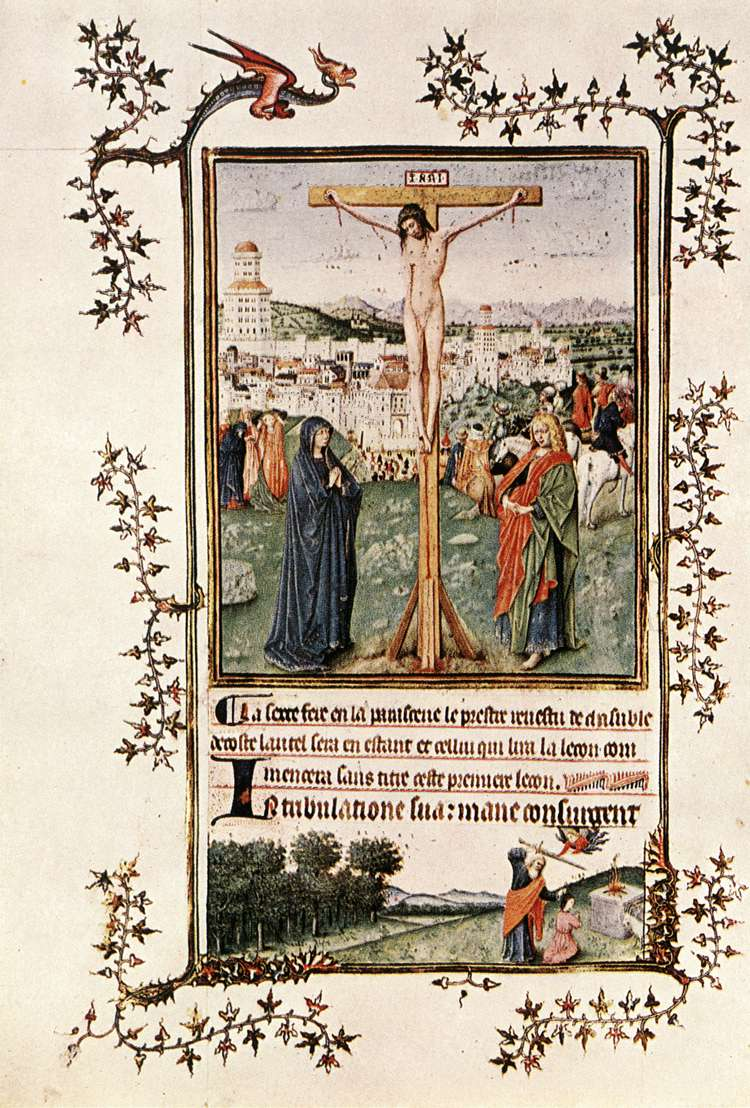
Leaf from the Turin-Milan Hours, unknown artist, c. 1440–1450. This illustration is often attributed to Jan van Eyck or a member of his workshop.

The panel captures the instant of Christ's death, traditionally the moment after the breaking of the thieves' legs (although this is not depicted). Christ is naked except for a transparent veil, with some of his pubic hair visible. His hands and feet are nailed to the timber; the blood from the nail holding his feet to the cross stains its wooden base. His arms strain under the weight of his upper body, and in his final agony, his jaw has fallen slack; his mouth is open with his teeth exposed in the grimace of death. In the mid-ground, at the base of the cross, Longinus, on horseback, wearing a fur-trimmed hat and green tunic, guided by an assistant, stretches to pierce Jesus' side with a lance, as deep-red blood pours from the wound. To the right of Longinus, a mostly obscured Stephaton holds high a sponge soaked with vinegar on the tip of a reed.

The first generation of Early Netherlandish painters did not usually pay much attention to landscape backgrounds. They were often included, showing strong influence from the Italian painters, but typically as minor elements of the composition, seen in the far distance and lacking any real observation of nature. This diptych, however, contains one of the most memorable landscape backgrounds in Northern 15th-century art. The panoramic view of Jerusalem extends upwards in the distance to the mountainous peaked range in the background. The sky, which continues to the upper part of the right-hand panel, is rendered in deep blues and lined with cumulus clouds. These clouds are similar to those in the Ghent Altarpiece and, as in that work, are included to give depth to and enliven the background skyscape. The sky seems to have just darkened, in keeping with the idea that the panel captures the moment of Jesus' death. Faint cirrus clouds can be seen in the far high-ground, with the presence of the sun is suggested by a shadow falling on the top left area of the panel.

=== Last Judgement panel ===
The right-hand wing, as with the Crucifixion wing, is divided horizontally into three areas. Here they represent, from top to bottom heaven, earth and hell. Heaven contains a traditional Great Deësis with clergy and laity; earth, in the mid-ground, is dominated by the figures of Archangel Michael and a personification of Death; while in the lower ground the damned fall into hell, where they are tortured and eaten by beasts. Describing the hell passage, art historian Bryson Burroughs writes that "the diabolical inventions of Bosch and Brueghel are children's boggy lands compared to the horrors of the hell [van Eyck] has imagined".

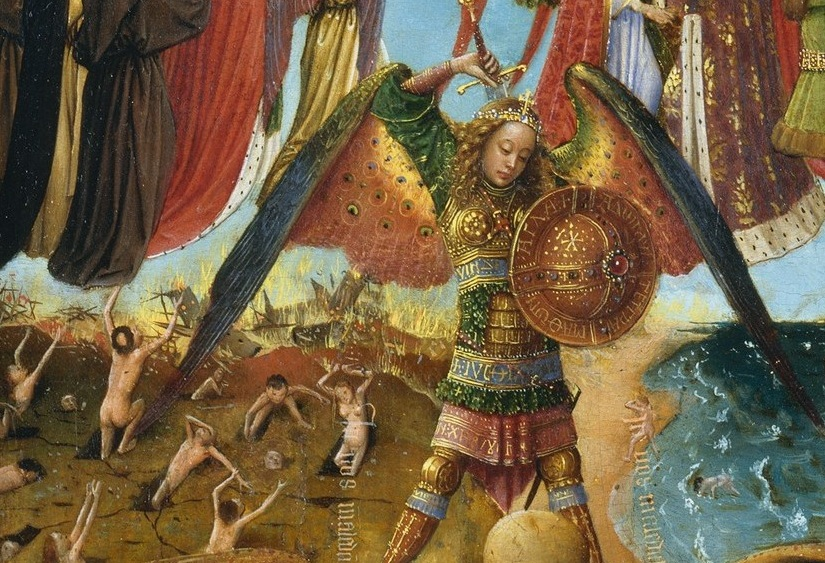
Saint Michael the Archangel bestrides the damned, while behind him the resurrected emerge from their graves before a burning city.

Pächt compares the scene to a medieval bestiary, comprising a "whole fauna of zoomorphic fiends". Van Eyck's hell is inhabited by demonic monsters whose only visible features are often "their glittering eyes and the white of their fangs". The sinners fall head first into their torment, at the mercy of devils taking recognisable forms such as rats, snakes and pigs, as well as a bear and a donkey. Daringly, van Eyck shows kings and members of the clergy among those condemned to hell.

The earth is represented by the narrow area between heaven and hell. The passage shows the resurrection of the dead as the fires of the last day rage. The dead rise from their graves to the left and from the stormy sea to the right. The Archangel Michael stands on death's shoulders, the largest figure in the painting, whose body and wings span the entire pictorial space. Michael wears jewel-studded golden armour and has curly blond hair and multicoloured wings similar to those seen in the donor panel of van Eyck's 1437 Dresden Triptych of the Virgin and Child. Michael appears, according to Smith, "like a giant on the earth, whose crust is revealed to be the wings of the skeletal figure of Death. The damned are excreted though Death's bowels into the dark slime of hell." The bat-like death figure, with skull extruding up to earth and skeletal arms and legs reaching down into hell, is the protagonist of the narrative according to Pächt, but death is vanquished by the slim and youthful looking archangel standing between the horrors of hell and the promise of heaven.

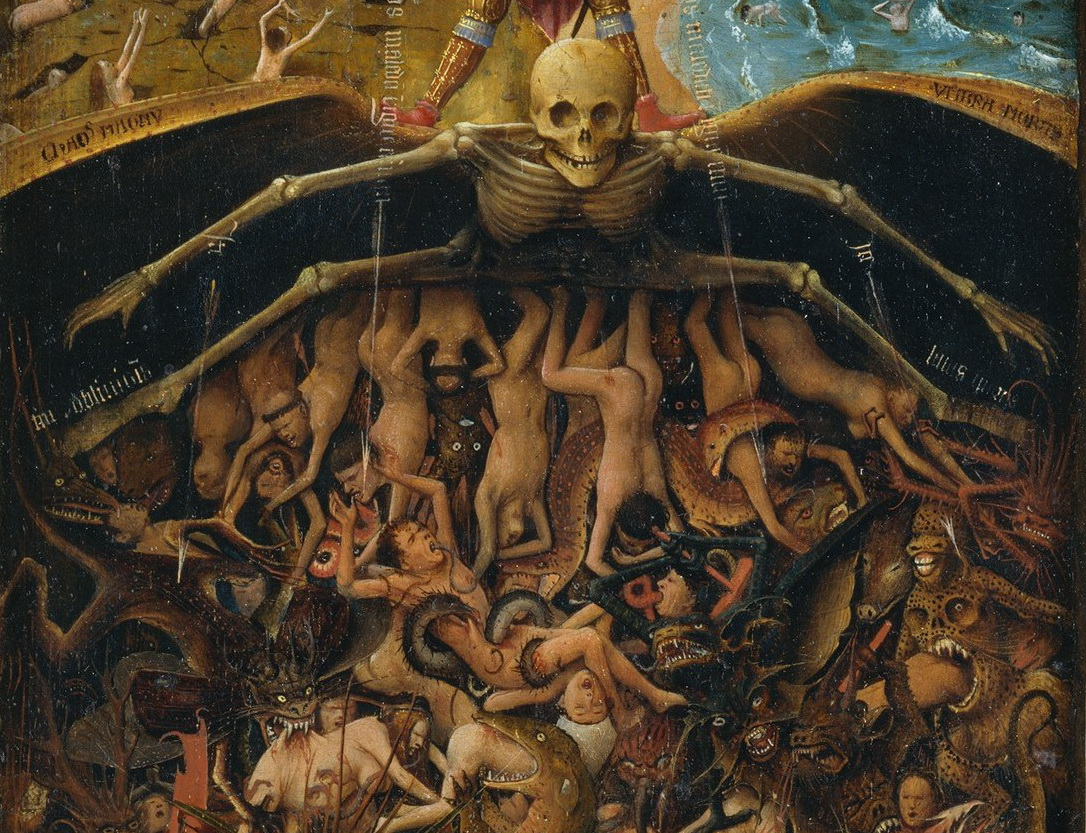
A personification of death spreads its skeletal wings over the fallen and damned, a number of whom can be identified by their headdress as members of the clergy.

The upper portion of the panel shows the second coming as recorded in Matthew 25:31: "But when the Son of Man comes in his glory, and all the holy angels with him, then he will sit on the throne of his glory." Christ, who was naked, frail and almost lifeless in the Crucifixion panel, is now resurrected and triumphant in heaven. He is dressed in a long red mantle and is barefoot. His hands and feet are surrounded by circles of yellow light. The Holy Wounds are visible on his palms held open; the puncture mark left by Longinus' spear is visible on his side through the opening in his robe, as are the nail holes on his feet.

Christ is seated at the centre of a large array of angels, saints and holy elders. According to Pächt, in this scene in heaven that "all is sweetness, gentleness and order". Mary and John the Baptist kneel in prayer to his immediate right and left. Both have halos and are rendered at a far larger scale than the surrounding figures, over whom they seem to tower. Mary holds her right hand at her breast, while her left is raised as if to ask for mercy for the smaller naked figures sheltered by her cloak, evoking the conventional pose of the Virgin of Mercy. A choir of virgins gather directly under Christ's feet. They face outwards towards the viewer and sing Christ's praise.

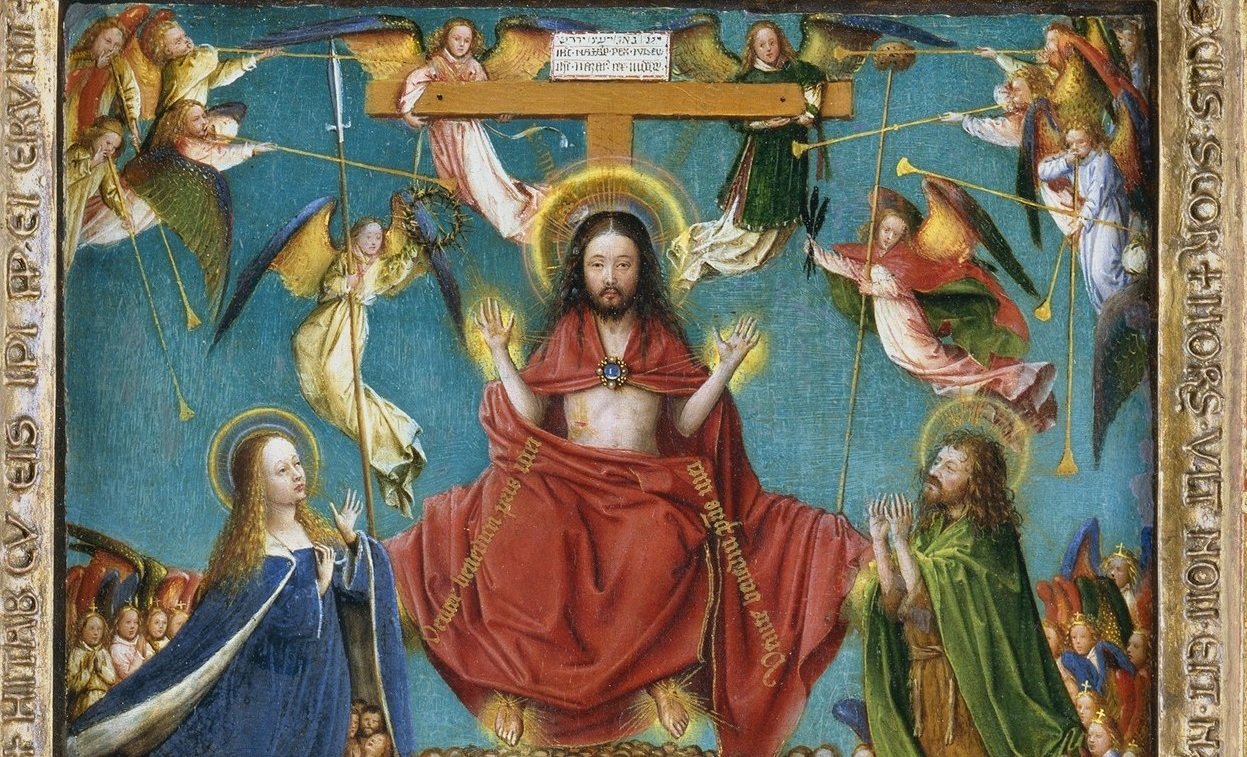
Detail of the Christ in Majesty. This area is considered to have been painted more broadly and with less skill than the other sections of the panels, and is thus thought by some to have been painted by members of van Eyck's workshop.

Headed by Saint Peter, the Apostles are dressed in white robes and sit on two facing benches set below Christ and to the right and left of the choir of virgins. Two angels attend to the groups gathered at each side of the benches. A further two angels are positioned immediately above Christ. They hold his cross and are dressed in white amice and albs, with the right-hand angel wearing an outer blue dalmatic vestment. They are flanked on either side by angels playing long wind instruments, probably trumpets. The two angels on either side of Christ bear the symbols of the crucifixion already represented on the left-hand panel. The angel on the left holds a lance and crown of thorns, the angel on the right a sponge and nails.

Van Eyck was a central influence on Petrus Christus and the younger painter is thought to have studied the panels while they were still in van Eyck's workshop. He made a much larger and adapted paraphrase of the panel in 1452, as part of a monumental altarpiece, now in Berlin. Although there are significant differences between the two works, the influence of van Eyck on Christus' work is most evident in the vertical, narrow format and in the central figure of Saint Michael, who also divides the scene between heaven and hell.

=== Iconography ===
Art historian John Ward highlights the rich and complex iconography and symbolic meaning van Eyck employed to bring attention to what he saw as the co-existence of the spiritual and material worlds. In his paintings, iconographical features are typically subtly woven into the work, as "relatively small, in the background, or in the shadow [details]". The significance of the imagery is often so densely and intricately layered that a work has to be viewed multiple times before even the most obvious meanings become apparent. According to Ward, the iconographical elements are commonly positioned "initially to overlook, and eventually to discover". Writing about the Last Judgement panel, Burroughs notes that "each of its several scenes requires attention for itself alone". According to Ward, van Eyck forces the viewer to search for the meaning in the iconography, creating a multi-layered surface which rewards the attentive viewer with deeper understanding of both the painting and its symbols. Much of van Eyck's iconography intends to convey the idea of "the promised passage from sin and death to salvation and rebirth".

=== Inscriptions ===
Both the frames and pictorial areas of the diptych are heavily inscribed with lettering and phrases in Latin, Greek and Hebrew. Van Eyck's early works display a predilection for inscriptions, which serve a dual purpose. They are decorative while also functioning in a manner similar to the commentaries often seen on the margins of medieval manuscripts which set in context the significance of the accompanying imagery. Diptychs were usually commissioned for private devotion, and van Eyck would have expected the viewer to contemplate text and imagery in unison.

In this work, the inscriptions are in Roman capitals or Gothic miniature, and in some places seem to contain misspellings, making interpretation difficult. Its gold-lined frame and Latin inscriptions, with their subtle references to various passages in the two panels, indicate that the donor was wealthy and educated. The sides of each frame are lined with inscriptions from the Book of Isaiah (53:6–9, 12), Revelations (20:13, 21:3–4) or the Book of Deuteronomy (32:23–24). In the right-hand panel, the wings of the figure of death contain Latin inscriptions on either side; on the left are the words CHAOS MAGNVM ("great chaos"), with UMBRA MORTIS ("shadow of death") inscribed to the right. A warning from Matthew 25:41 is written on both sides of death's head and wings, and extends from earth down into the hell section. It reads, Ite vos maledicti in ignem eternam ("Go, ye cursed, into everlasting fire"). In this way, van Eyck dramatically aligns the biblical extract in diagonal dual beams of light seemingly hurled from the heavens. Also in the section are letters reading ME OBVLIVI.

In the mid-ground, the Archangel Michael's armour is heavily inscribed with esoteric and often difficult to source phrases. Letters on his breast plate read VINAE(X) while his jewel-encrusted oval buckler displays the cross and is decorated with Greek script reading ADORAVI TETGRAMMATHON AGLA. The meaning of this phrase has not been conclusively identified; some art historians believe it contains misspellings and has been misread. Friedländer transcribed the first word as ADORAVI while the final word AGLA is thought be taken from the first four letters of the Hebrew words for "Thou Art Mighty", and thus may signify God; the word also appears in a floor tile in the Ghent Altarpiece. In the upper portion, gilded inscriptions running vertically across the edges of Christ's mantle read VENITE BENEDICTI PATRIS MEI ("Come, ye blessed of my father").

== Attribution and dating ==
Over the years the panels have been attributed to both Jan and Hubert van Eyck as well as Petrus Christus. In 1841, Passavant attributed the diptych jointly to Hubert and Jan van Eyck; by 1853, he had revised his opinion and gave attribution exclusively to Jan. Gustav Waagen, the first director of the Gemäldegalerie, Berlin, attributed them to Petrus Christus in the mid 19th-century, based on the left-hand panel's similarity in composition to a 1452 Last Judgement signed by Christus now in Berlin. This view was rejected in 1887, and they once more became associated with Jan. The panels came into the possession of the Hermitage Gallery in 1917, credited to Jan.

Bryson Burroughs, writing for the Metropolitan at the time of their acquisition in 1933, attributed the works to Hubert. Burroughs saw in the panels the hand of an expressive artist, "all nerves and sensibilities", overcome with sympathy for the plight of the central figures in the panels, but who was nonetheless weak in drawing line. This profile, he believed, was incompatible with the aloof and impassive master craftsman Jan is known to have been. Yet Burroughs acknowledged there was "no certain documented proof for the attribution [to Hubert]". He admitted his evidence was "limited, inevitably incomplete", and thus "circumstantial and presumptive". More recent scholarship tends to agree Jan painted the panels based on the evidence that they are stylistically closer to Jan than Hubert, who died in 1426; and that Jan, who travelled across the Alps to Italy that year, painted the mountain range.

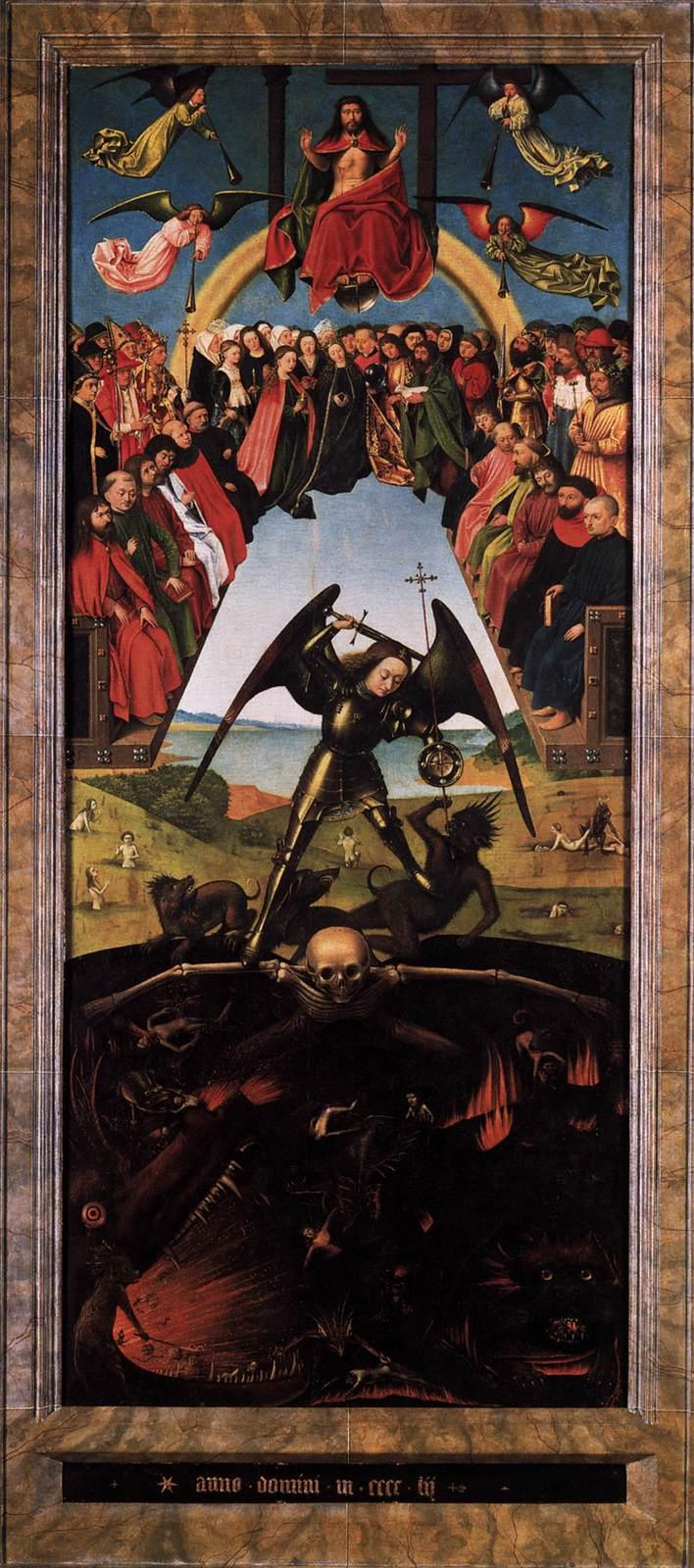
Petrus Christus's Last Judgement (1452) is a much larger, though more sparse and more easily "read", near-copy of van Eyck's panel. Panofsky commented that "what [Christus] thought difficult to understand, he explained; and what he chose to retain, he rendered in simple, vernacular language". Gemäldegalerie, Berlin

The paintings have often been compared to the seven pages of the Turin-Milan Hours illuminated manuscript attributed to the unidentified artist "Hand G", generally thought to have been Jan van Eyck. The closeness is seen to lie both in the miniaturist technique and the particular painterly style. The similarity of a Turin drawing of the crucified Christ to the figure in the New York diptych has led some art historians to conclude they were, at least, painted near the same time, during the 1420s and early 1430s. Most believe both the drawing and diptych panel at least originated from a prototype designed by Jan van Eyck. Panofsky attributed the New York panels to "Hand G". When the Turin-Milan Hours miniatures were discovered they were at first believed to have been painted before the Duke of Berry's death in 1416, an idea that was quickly rejected with the date extended to sometime in the early 1430s.

Pächt writes of the diptych that it reflects the "personal style and unique scenic imagination" of "Hand G" (whom he believed to be either Hubert or Jan). Until Hans Belting and Dagmar Eichberger's 1983 Jan van Eyck als Erzähler, academics tended to focus exclusively on the diptych's dating and attribution, with little attention paid to its source influences and iconography. Borchert estimates a completion of c. 1440, while Paul Durrieu suggests a dating as early as 1413. In 1983, Belting and Eichberger suggested a date of c. 1430 based on specific characteristics of the work: the "birds-eye view" perspective and horizon, the densely packed figures and, especially, a pictorial narrative that moves logically across the areas of the image in the Crucifixion panel. Belting and Eichberger believe this style was employed during the early panel works, but was largely abandoned by the 1430s.

The 1430s dating is supported by the style of the underdrawing, which is consistent with known signed works by van Eyck from that time. In addition, the figures are dressed in clothes fashionable in the 1420s with the exception of one of the possible donors, tentatively identified as Margaret of Bavaria, who is depicted as the sybil standing in the right foreground of the crucifixion panel and wears clothes in style in the early 1430s.

The upper portions of the Last Judgement panel are generally considered as the work of a weaker painter with a less individual style. It is thought that van Eyck left the panels unfinished with completed underdrawings, and the area was finished by workshop members or by followers after he died. Maryan Ainsworth of the Metropolitan takes a different view. She highlights the close relationship known to have existed between contemporary workshops in the Low Countries and France, and speculates that a French miniaturist or illuminator, perhaps from the workshop of the Bedford Master, travelled to Bruges to assist van Eyck on the right-hand panel.

== Provenance ==
Nothing is known of the work's provenance before the 1840s. Given the panels' diminutive size—which is typical of early diptychs—it seems probable that the work was commissioned for private rather than public devotion. The notion of a well-educated patron, with knowledge of and appreciation for the art of earlier centuries, is reinforced by both the classical language inscriptions and the abundant detail found across all areas of the panels.

Writing in 1841 in the journal Kunstblatt, Passavant gave an account of how the panels were bought at auction from either a Spanish monastery or convent. The Russian diplomat Dmitry Tatishchev acquired the panels, possibly from a Spanish convent or monastery near Madrid or Burgos, while living in Spain between 1814 and 1821. Tatishchev left his pictures to Tsar Nicholas I in 1845, and they came into the possession of the Hermitage Gallery in Saint Petersburg in 1917.

The panels were included in the Soviet sale of Hermitage paintings, which included another important van Eyck work, the 1434–1436 Annunciation. They were purchased by Charles Henschel of New York art dealer M. Knoedler & Company for $185,000, significantly less than the asking price of $600,000 when the works were offered in 1931. The panels were shipped from Saint Petersburg to the Matthiesen Gallery in Berlin before M. Knoedler & Company sold them on to the Metropolitan in New York that year.

== Gallery ==
=== Left panel ===
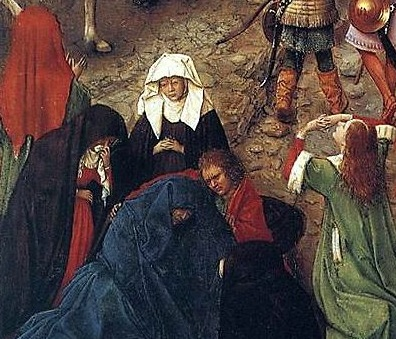
Women swoon in mourning in the foreground.

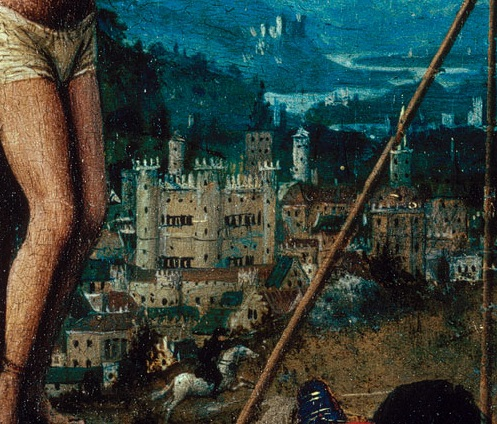
Landscape of Jerusalem seen beyond the cross

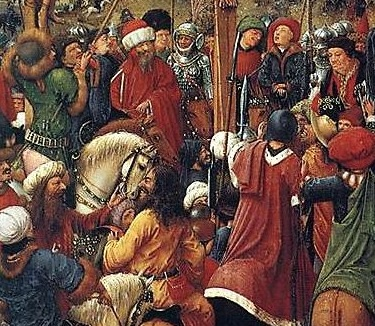
Oriental looking onlookers gather at the base of the cross.

=== Right panel ===
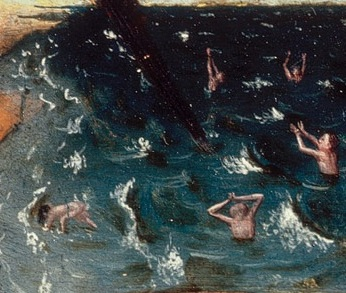
To the right of the Archangel Michael, the resurrected are called from their graves on the seabed to face judgement.

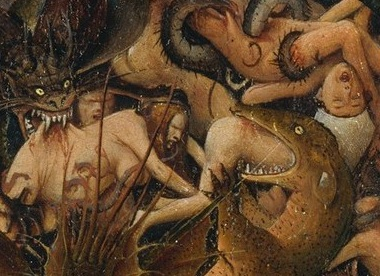
The flesh of a large-breasted woman is torn apart by the teeth of a demon, while a lizard-shaped devil in front of her feeds on a man whom he pushes into his mouth head first.

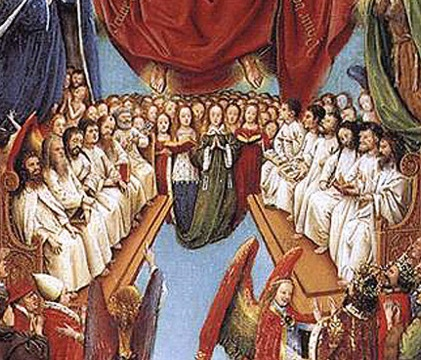
Attendants to the resurrected Christ, upper right panel. Because of its relative stylistic simplicity, this section is thought to have been designed by van Eyck, but completed by a member of his workshop.
