= William H. Weale =

British art historian (1832–1917)

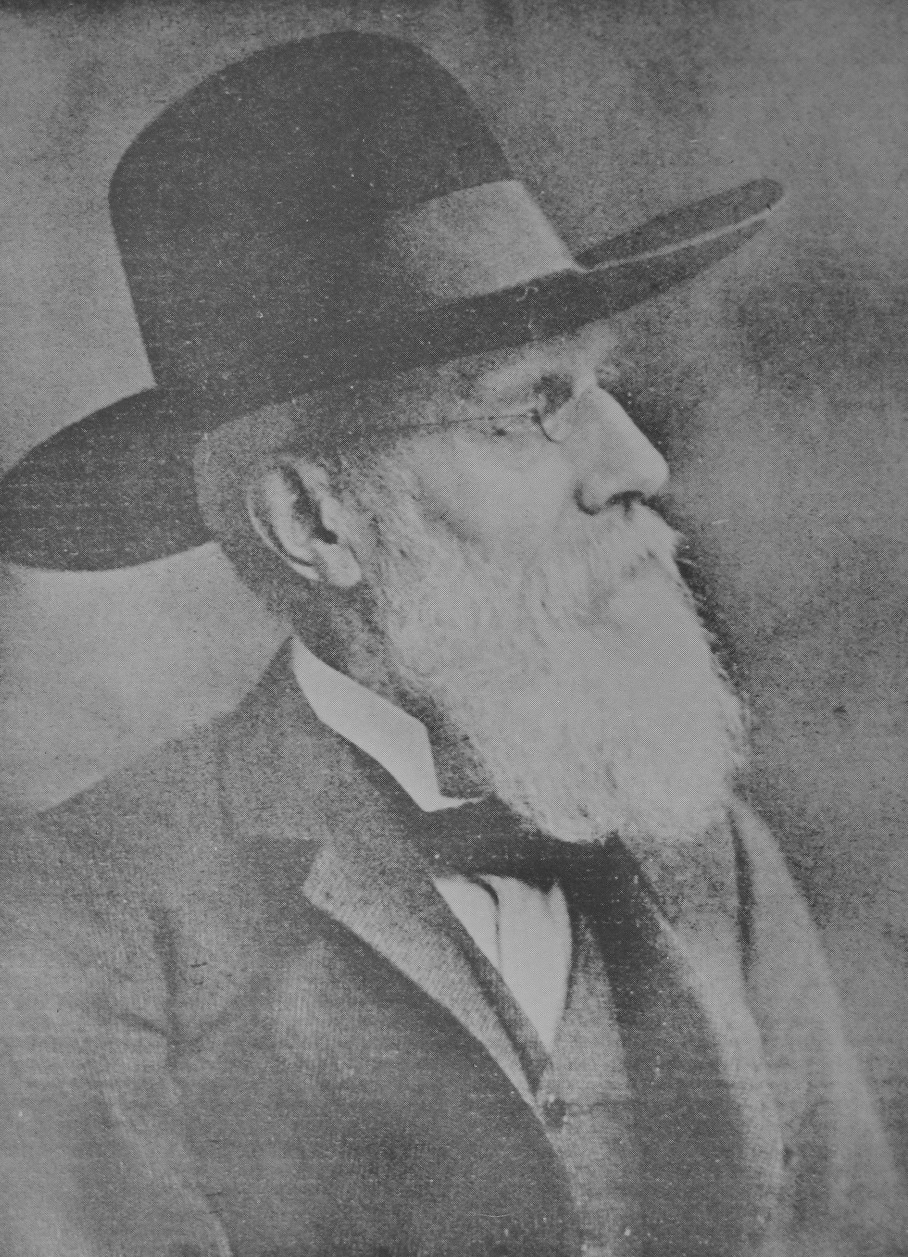
W. H. James Weale in London in 1904.

William Henry James Weale (8 March 1832 – 26 April 1917) was a British art historian who lived and worked most of his life in Bruges and was one of the first to research the Early Netherlandish painting (then better known as "Flemish Primitives") extensively. He was also a pioneer in the study of early bookbinding, and a staunch promoter of Gothic Revival architecture.

== Biography ==
Weale was born in Marylebone, London, in 1832 as the son of James Weale (died 1838) and Susan de Vezian (died 1855). His father was the librarian to John Baker Holroyd, 1st Earl of Sheffield and had a large book collection of his own. Weale had two sisters: Charlotte and Henrietta. Weale studied at King's College London between 1843 and 1848. He was the headmaster at a school in Islington.

In 1854, he married Helena Amelia Walton, and the next year, after the death of his mother, they moved to Bruges. Weale was already interested in early Flemish art, and could pursue that interest much better in Flanders. He produced his first books on the topic in 1861. He was a member of the Belgian Royal Commission for Art and Architecture from 1860, and the Belgian Royal Commission for Monuments from 1861 on.

In August 1863, in the wake of the first of the Malines Congresses, he founded the Guild of Saint Thomas and Saint Luke, an association to study and promote Christian art. Weale was a devout Roman Catholic convert and was inspired by Augustus Pugin and his 1841 work, The True Principles of Pointed or Christian architecture. Besides Weale as secretary, other members of the initial guild included the first president, the Belgian Charles-Joseph Voisin, and as vice-presidents the Dutch Joseph Albert Alberdingk Thijm and the German Franz Johann Joseph Bock.

In 1865 Weale founded together with Guido Gezelle the magazine Rond den Heerd. The same year, he formed the Société Archéologique in Bruges. Other magazines he founded were Le Beffroi and La Flandre, and he also published in major art and literary magazines such as Athenaeum and the Gazette des Beaux-Arts.

In 1864 he curated an exhibition on ecclesiastical art in Mechelen, and in 1867 he organised the first exhibition around the Flemish Primitives in Bruges, for which he also wrote the catalogues. In 1872, Weale catalogued the Flemish pottery at the Victoria and Albert Museum (then named the South Kensington Museum) where he became a curator in 1874. In 1879, he returned to England with his family and founded there the Guild of Saint Gregory and Saint Luke. He became the curator of the library of the South Kensington Museum in 1890, where he remained until his retirement in 1897.

He started writing artist biographies, with one on Gerard David appearing in 1895, another about Hans Memling in 1901, and a final and most ambitious one on the Van Eyck brothers in 1908, with a revised edition in 1912. Meanwhile, in 1902, he organised the ambitious Exposition des primitifs flamands à Bruges, the largest exposition of works by Early Netherlandish painters up till then, which was groundbreaking and the source of many publications and research.

Weale died on 26 April 1917 in Clapham Common, London and was buried at the church of St. Mary Magdalene, Mortlake, near Richmond in Surrey. When his sister, Charlotte, a keen Anglican, died in 1918 she left instructions that no Roman Catholics should be allowed in her house after she died.

== Works ==
- 1849: Flores Ecclesiae: the saints of the Catholic Church arranged according to the calendar: with the flowers dedicated to them, London, James Burns
- 1853: Sequentiae ineditae
- 1858: Des dalles et cuivres tumulaires, De Busscher
- 1859: A new guide-book to Belgium, Aix-la-Chapelle and Cologne
- 1859: Some observations on guide-books (Bruges)
- 1859: Ivoires sculptés de Genoels-Elderen, près de Tongres, Hebbelinck
- 1861: Catalogue du musée de l'Académie de Bruges, Beyaert-Defoort
- 1861: Notes sur Jan van Eyck
- 1862: Bruges et ses environs : description des monuments, objets d'art et antiquités, précédée d'une notice historique, Beyaert-Defoort (4th edition in 1884)
- 1865: Hans Memlinc: A notice on his life and works, Arundel Society
- 1886: Catalogus missalium ritus latini, Bernard Quaritch
- 1889: Analecta Liturgica
- 1894-1898: Bookbindings and rubbings of bookbindings in the National Art Library, South Kensington Museum
- 1895: Gerard David: Painter and Illuminator, Seeley
- 1898: Early painting at Bruges
- 1898: Jean Le Breton, Prototypographe Français
- 1900: The Van Eycks
- 1901: Hans Memlinc
- 1908: Hubert and John Van Eyck, Their Life and Work, Volume 1, J. Lane
- 1922: Early stamped bookbindings in the British Museum (completed by Lawrence Taylor after Weale's death)
