= List of Fire Force chapters =

Cover of the first tankōbon, released in Japan by Kodansha on February 17, 2016

Fire Force is a Japanese manga series written and illustrated by Atsushi Ohkubo. It was serialized in Kodansha's shōnen manga magazine Weekly Shōnen Magazine from September 23, 2015, to February 22, 2022. Kodansha collected its chapters in 34 tankōbon volumes, released from February 17, 2016, to May 17, 2022.

In North America, the series was licensed for English release by Kodansha USA. The 34 volumes were released from November 8, 2016, to October 3, 2023. A 12-volume omnibus edition was released by the publisher from November 29, 2022, to September 17, 2024.

== Volumes ==
No.	Original release date	Original ISBN	English release date	English ISBN
1	February 17, 2016	978-4-06-395567-5	November 8, 2016	978-1-63236-330-5
00. "Shinra Kusakabe Joins the Force" (森羅 日下部 入隊, Shinra Kusakabe Nyūtai); 01. "First Run" (初現場, Hatsu Genba); 02. "The Devil, the Knight, and the Witch" (悪魔と騎士と魔女, Akuma to Kishi to Majo); 03. "The Heart of a Fire Soldier" (消防官の心, Shōbōkan no Kokoro); 04. "The Sinister Blasphemer" (怪しき冒涜者, Ayashiki Bōtokusha); 05. "The Rookie Fire Soldier Games" (消防官新人大会, Shōbōkan Shinjin Taikai)
Shinra Kusakabe, a youth dubbed "Devil's Footprints" due to his power of igniting his feet at will, joins Special Fire Force Company 8, a specialized fire brigade of pyrokinetics under Captain Obi who destroy humans turned into mindless Infernals. During his first mission, Shinra recalls the events that him got blamed for a fire that killed his family twelve years ago while cementing his desire to become a hero. Meeting his fellow recruit Arthur Boyle while learning of the Rookie Fire Soldier games, Shinra encounters Tamaki Kotatsu of Special Fire Force Company 1 and her captain Leonard Burns, whom he recognizes as the man who saved him twelve years ago. Shinra also encounters a mysterious pyrokinetic named Joker, who previously observed Company 8 before revealing himself out of an interest in Shinra.
2	April 15, 2016	978-4-06-395646-7	February 7, 2017	978-1-63236-331-2
06. "The Evil That Knows the Truth" (真実を知る悪意, Shinjitsu wo Shiru Akui); 07. "The Devil and the Joker" (悪魔とJOKER, Akuma to Jōkā); 08. "Seeking the Truth" (真実を求めて, Shinjitsu o Motomete); 09. "Company 8's Quarry" (第8が追うもの, Dai Hachi ga Ou Mono); 10. "An Infernal with a Will" (意志を持つ"焔ビト", Ishi wo Motsu "Homura Bito"); 11. "The Hero and the Princess" (ヒーローと姫, Hīrō to Hime); 12. "Company 5 and Company 8" (第5と第8, Dai Go to Dai Hachi); 13. "Standby" (スタンバイ, Sutanbai); 14. "The Holy Woman's Resolve" (聖女の決意, Seijo no Ketsui); 15. "The Battle Begins" (開戦, Kaisen)
Shinra encounters Joker when he interferes in the Rookie Fire Soldier games, revealing to the youth that his younger brother Sho Kusakabe is still alive while tempting him into an alliance to learn further secrets behind the Fire Force. Shinra later learns that Company 8 was established to investigate the other Special Fire Force Companies since they operate independently and may be deliberately concealing information about human combustion that could end the Infernal threat. During their encounter with Setsuo Miyamoto, a murderous fire fighter who retained his sense of self after turning into an Infernal, Company 8 encounters Special Fire Force Company 5 under the command of Princess Hibana. Company 8 are forced to allow Hibana to take Miyamoto into custody to experiment on. But when Iris ends up being abducted by Hibana when she confronts her former friend, the group mount a rescue mission that places them in conflict with Company 5.
3	June 17, 2016	978-4-06-395698-6	April 4, 2017	978-1-63236-378-7
16. "The Knight Erring" (騎士の不覚, Kishi no Fukaku); 17. "Shinra vs. Hibana" (シンラvs.火華); 18. "Clash" (激突, Gekitotsu); 19. "The Flower of Promise" (約束の火華, Yakusoku no Hibana); 20. "Where the Inferno Is Born" (焔の生まれる所, Homura no Umareru Tokoro); 21. "Commence Investigation of Company 1" (第1調査開始, Dai Ichi Chōsa Kaishi); 22. "Operation: Infiltrate Company 1" (第1潜入作戦, Dai Ichi Senyū Sakusen); 23. "The Pyrokinetics of Company 1" (第1能力者たち, Dai Ichi Nōryokusha Tachi); 24. "Shinra vs. Burns" (シンラvs.バーンズ, Shinra vs. Bānzu); 25. "After That Suspect!" (犯人を追え!, Han'nin wo oe!!)
Company 8 slowly gains the upper hand against Company 5 as Arthur destroys Miyamoto while Shinra battles Hibana, who was revealed to be the only other survivor besides Iris when their orphanage was consumed in flames. Despite her resolve and ideals, Hibana is defeated and reveals to Obi that someone is turning people into Infernals within the Shinjuku district which is the jurisdiction of Burns and Company 1. Obi uses the rookie training reassignment system have Shinra and Arthur infiltrate Company 1, the two placed under the care of Lieutenant Flam Karim after Burns defeats them in a sparring match.
4	August 17, 2016	978-4-06-395736-5	June 13, 2017	978-1-63236-431-9
26. "Infernal Bugs" (焰の蟲, Homura no Mushi); 27. "Unpardonable Evil" (許されざる悪, Yurusarezaru Aku); 28. "Shinra vs. Rekka" (シンラvs.レッカ); 29. "Fists or Feet" (拳か脚か, Kobushi ka Ashi ka); 30. "The Man at His Back" (後ろに立つ男, Ushiro Ni Tatsu Otoko); 31. "Scorching Malice" (燃え拡がる悪意, Moehirogaru Akui); 32. "A New Menace" (新たなる敵, Aratanaru Teki); 33. "Heroes Assemble" (英雄集結, Eiyū Shūketsu); 34. "The Boy Knight" (少年騎士, Shōnen Kishi)
Having infiltrated Company 1, Shinra and Arthur find nothing amiss until the former sees someone using an insect to turn a human into an Infernal while on a Company 1 mission. The pursuit led the two to Flam Karim and his fellow Lieutenant Rekka Hoshimiya, later learning Flam is also investigating the Infernal Bugs with Rekka revealed to be the culprit. Shinra saves Tamaki from certain death after she realized too late that Rekka used her to gather children with one surviving the process and becoming a pyrokinetic. When Rekka noticed one of his insects react to Shinra, he reveals to be acting on the Evangelist's beckoning to gather "pilot lights" so they can turn Earth into a second sun. Shinra is disgusted by it and that his brother's abduction might be connected, defeating Rekka with Flam Karim freezing him. But Rekka is assassinated by his comrades, who cripple Company 1 Lieutenant Huo Yan Li before falling back. Karim offers his aid to Company 8 while Tamaki is transferred to them following her suspension.
5	October 17, 2016	978-4-06-395777-8	August 22, 2017	978-1-63236-432-6
35. "The Promise" (約束, Yakusoku); 36. "The Origins of Fire Force Company 8 — Part One" (第8特殊消防隊結成 前編, Dai Hachi Tokushu Shōbōtai Kessei Zenpen); 37. "The Origins of Fire Force Company 8 — Part Two" (第8特殊消防隊結成 後編, Dai Hachi Tokushu Shōbōtai Kessei Kōhen); 38. "The Whereabouts of the White-Clad" (白づくめの行方, Shiro Zukume No Yuku-e); 39. "The Greatest Hikeshi" (最強の火消し, Saikyō no Hikeshi); 40. "The Night Before the Battle of Asakusa" (浅草開戦前夜, Asakusa Kaisen Zenya); 41. "A Composite Fire Soldier Enraged" (怒りの煉合消防官, Ikari no Rengou Shōbōkan); 42. "Ōbi vs. Benimaru" (桜備vs.紅丸)
The Company captains are called to the Imperial Throne Room for an emergency conference to discuss the Evangelist and Adolla Burst that Shinra possess, Shinra encountering Joker who reveals Shinra's younger brother, Sho Kusakabe, serves the Evangelist as leader of the White Clad cult's Knights of the Ashen Flame. Over dinner, Shinra shares this information with Company 8, with Lieutenant Takehisa Hinawa later telling the story of Company 8's formation. Company 8 decides to arrive unannounced at Company 7's headquarters in the Asakusa district before its captain Shinmon Benimaru kills a town local turned into an Infernal. While Company 8 manage to win over Benimaru by helping him in Asakusa's reconstruction, they are attacked him by after the White Clad trick Benimaru into believing Company 8 caused the Infernal attacks. Obi and Benimaru are evenly matched with former attempting to reason with his opponent before Benimaru's righthand Konro stops the fight on Company 8's behalf.
6	December 16, 2016	978-4-06-395823-2; 978-4-06-358843-9 (SP)	October 10, 2017	978-1-63236-478-4
43. "The Reason We Fight" (戦う理由, Tatakau Riyū); 44. "Company 7 Is Born" (生まれる第7, Umareru Dai Nana); 45. "The Trap Is Set" (仕組まれた罠, Shikumareta Wana); 46. "After That Sniper!" (狙撃手を追え!, Sogekishu wo Oe!); 47. "Two-on-Two Death Match" (二対二の死闘, Ni Tai Ni no Shitō); 48. "The Pride of Asakusa" (浅草の誇り, Asakusa no Hokori); 49. "Fighting Festival" (喧嘩祭り, Kenka Matsuri); 50. "For Whom the Flame Burns" (誰が為の炎, Daga Tame no Honō); 51. "Wine Cups" (盃, Sakazuki)
As Benimaru leaves to confirm Company 8's testimony, and Konro explaining the injuries he suffered the night that their company fought a dangerous Infernal prior to being made an official branch of the Fire Force, the group find the Asakusa townsfolk arguing amongst themselves. This is revealed to be caused by Knight of the Ashen Flame's Yona using his powers to alter his subordinates' appearance to cause chaos with some becoming Infernals which Benimaru fights while Konro and the others deal with the fires. Shinra and Arthur manage to get the advantage on the White Clad members Arrow and Haran before the latter swallows an Infernal Bug and transforms into a Demon-type Infernal, Arrow recognizing Shinra to have an Adolla Burst as Shinra deflects her attacks while Benimaru safely destroys the Infernal. Later, Benimaru and Obi share some sake to seal the friendship between Companies 7 and 8.
7	February 17, 2017	978-4-06-395869-0	December 5, 2017	978-1-63236-479-1
52. "A World Aflame" (焔の世界, Honō no Sekai); 53. "God of the Forge" (鍛冶場の神様, Kajiba no Kami-sama); 54. "The Man Pulling the Strings" (暗躍する者, Anyaku-suru Mono); 55. "The Blacksmith's Dream" (鍛冶屋の夢, Kajiya no Yume); 56. "The Knight King Atop His Steed" (馬上の騎士王, Bajō no Kishi Ō); 57. "Dire Straits!!" (窮地！！, Kyūchi!!); 58. "We're Family" (俺たちは家族, Ore-tachi wa Kazoku); 59. "Arrival!" (到着！, Tōchaku!); 60. "Black and White and Gray" (黒と白と灰色, Kuro to Shiro to Haiiro)
Following the Asakusa incident, Company 8 receive Hajima Industries' eccentric genius Viktor Licht as their forensic scientist while Shinra, Arthur, and Iris try recruiting the crackerjack engineer Vulcan Joseph who lives in a junkyard with his assistants Lisa Isaribe and Yu. Vulcan expresses his desire to restore the planet's wildlife and his inherited disdain towards Hajima for stealing his ancestors' plans for the Amaterasu reactor, refusing both Shinra's offer and that from Company 3's captain Dr. Giovanni, whom he has a history with. Shinra soon learns that Giovanni is a White-Clad member who plots to attack Vulcan's workshop, with Arthur and Hibana losing against Flail and Mirage as Lisa is revealed to be a White-Clad spy. Giovanni acquires Amaterasu's key as Shinra finds himself overpowered by his younger brother Sho, with Joker holding him off so Licht can get Company 8, Vulcan, Yu, and Hibana to safety. Seeing Company 8 first hand and having a similar resolve to his own, Vulcan decides to join their ranks.
8	April 17, 2017	978-4-06-395916-1	February 13, 2018	978-1-63236-547-7
61. "The Hallowed Blade" (聖なる刀身, Seinaru Tōshin); 62. "Promises" (約束, Yakusoku); 63. "Allies" (仲間, Nakama); 64. "Training Ground" (修行の地, Shugyō no Chi); 65. "The Mysteries of Ignition" (発火の極意, Hakka no Gokui); 66. "Various Results" (それぞれの成果, Sorezore no Seika); 67. "To the Nether" (地下(ネザー)への, Nezā e no); 68. "Lost in the Dark" (迷いの闇, Mayoi no Yami); 69. "Maki vs. Flail" (マキvs.フレイル, Maki vs. Fureiru)
Following Obi and Hibana sharing the latest intel on the White-Clad with Karim and Konro, along with Giovanni have left the Fire Force despite his actions being covered up, Licht meets up with Joker while gathering clues on the White-Clads' base as the two agree that Shinra needs improvement to stand a chance against Sho. After Shinra and Arthur visit Asakusa for training under Benimaru, they and the rest of Company 8 are informed by Licht that the White-Clad are hiding in the Nether, a forbidden area of abandoned subway tunnels beneath the Tokyo Empire. When the company enter the Nether the next day, the plan of staying together is thwarted when they are enveloped in a mysterious fog and encounter impostors created by Yona and Mirage while Sho sends in Assault the Slaughterer to aid in the intruders' disposal. Ending up alone before being found by Flail and his subordinates, Maki defeats a White-Clad group by using the cannon-like devices that Vulcan developed for her living fireballs.
9	June 16, 2017	978-4-06-395958-1	April 3, 2018	978-1-63236-548-4
70. "To Protect" (守るということ, Mamoru to Iu Koto); 71. "Tamaki vs. Assault" (タマキvs.アサルト, Tamaki vs. Asaruto); 72. "The Bullet’s Trajectory" (弾丸の行方, Dangan no Yukue); 73. "Wearing His Pride" (誇りを纏って, Hokori wo Matotte); 74. "The Flash of a Blade" (一閃の太刀, Issen no Tachi); 75. "The Pride of a Fire Soldier" (消防官の誇り, Shōbōkan no Hokori); 76. "Sticking to Your Guns" (貫く意志, Tsuranuku Ishi); 77. "Connection" (繋がる者, Tisunagaru Mono); 78. "Brother to Brother" (兄と弟, Ani to Otōto)
While Tamaki manages to defeat Assault with Iris's help before the girls find Maki, Hinawa overwhelms Arrow before Arthur saves him from Yona and Mirage by killing off the latter. Elsewhere, Vulcan and Obi encounter Giovanni as he has Lisa attack the two Fire Soldiers before using her as a hostage to force Vulcan into shooting Obi. But Vulcan manages to trick Giovanni into letting his guard down for Obi to attack him. Meanwhile, Shinra and Licht find Sho with the former being forced to fight his brother as Sho reveals his Adolla Burt ability.
10	August 17, 2017	978-4-06-510113-1	June 26, 2018	978-1-63236-621-4
79. "Beyond the Deathmatch" (死闘の先に, Shitō no Saki ni); 80. "Shō's Power" (ショウの能力, Shō no Nōryoku); 81. "A Big Brother’s Determination" (兄の意地, Ani no Iji); 82. "The Grace of the Evangelist" (伝導者の加護, Dendōsha no Kako); 83. "Fourth Generation" (第四世代, Dai Yon Sedai); 84. "Smile" (笑顔, Egao); 85. "A Plot Revealed" (語られる陰謀, Katarareru Inbō); 86. "The Iatrical Company" (“知”の消防隊, "Chi" no Shōbōtai); 87. "A Fire in the Ointment" (医と火, I to Hi)
As the White Clad members Yona and Haumea observe the battle, Shinra briefly finds himself in a colorless hellscape which Sho explains is the source of the Adolla Burst, encountering an Infernal and the Evangelist at the time before the brothers return their reality. Despite Licht explaining the nature of Sho's Adolla Burst to effect universe's thermal expansion to give the illusion of manipulating time, Shinra braves through his brother's attacks while awakening his Adolla Burst ability to move at the speed of light. Shinra ignores the risks of his new power as he establishes an Adolla Link to show Sho his memories of their past, only for Haumea to reveal herself at the last second. Hamuea explains that the Evangelist seeks six other Pillars besides Shinra and Sho to kick-start the Great Cataclysm again, with her and Yona taking only Sho when Company 8 prevent her from taking Shinra as the Evangelist causes the tunnel to collapse. Company 8 fall back to take Shinra to Special Fire Hospital 6 to be healed by Director Kayoko Huang. Shinra awakens three days later and is greeted by Captain Leonard Burns, furious to learn that Company 1 leader knew what actually happened in the Kusakabe house fire and Sho's indoctrination into the White Clad.
11	November 17, 2017	978-4-06-510397-5	August 18, 2018	978-1-63236-622-1
88. "Past and Present" (過去と今, Kako to Ima); 89. "Fiery Past" (燃ゆる過去, Moyuru Kako); 90. "At Tragedy’s End" (悲劇の果てに, Higeki no Hate ni); 91. "A Fire Man’s Fight" (消防官(おとこ)の戦い, Otoko no Tatakai); 92. "The Lieutenant Remodeling Project" (中隊長改造計画, Chūtaichō Kaizō Keikaku); 93. "Special Fire Force Company 4" (第4特殊消防隊, Dai Yon Tokushu Shōbōtai); 94. "Sōichirō Hague" (蒼一郎 アーグ, Sōichirō Āgu); 95. "Flames of Madness" (狂気の炎, Kyōki no Honō); 96. "Old Friends United" (集う旧友, Tsudō Kyūyū)
Shinra is determined to find a way to transform the Infernals into people and unravel the mystery of the Evangelist and Adolla Burst. Maki, Iris and Tamaki take Shinra to buy clothes for Lieutenant Hinawa due to his poor sense of dress. Later, Captain Obi introduces Shinra the Fire Force's highly competitive annual male nude calendar project. However, their cheesy "double cobra" pose causes the photo to be relegated to last place as in the previous year. Shinra then meets Captain Soichiro Hague of the 4th Brigade, who surprisingly asks him to burn it, and Shinra is prompted by a young woman's voice in his head to use all of her power. From afar, Haumea comments to Charon that the woman known as the First Pillar continues to tempt Shinra to use her Adolla Burst. Shinra loses control and Hague realizes the situation so he forces Shinra out where Arthur appears and intercedes to stop Shinra from using all of his power.
12	January 17, 2018	978-4-06-510761-4	October 16, 2018	978-1-63236-663-4
97. "The Origins of the Knight King" (騎士王の由縁, Kishi Ō no Yuen); 98. "Shinra vs. Arthur" (シンラvs.アーサー, Shinra vs. Āsā); 99. "A New Kindling" (新たな火種, Arata na Hidane); 100. "The Scent of the Flame" (炎の香り, Honō no Kaori); 101. "Tragedy in the Fire" (火中の惨劇, Kachū no Sangeki); 102. "Raging Fists" (荒ぶる拳, Araburu Kobushi); 103. "Groping Through the Flames" (火中模索, Kachū Mosaku); 104. "Bonds of the Fireground" (火事場の絆, Kajiba no Kizuna); 105. "Assemble!" (集結, Shūketsu)
The battle continues until, with the force of Arthur's attacks, Shinra repels the provocations of the First Pillar. As she leaves her consciousness, she reveals that there is another Pillar, a potential resource for both the Evangelist and the Fire Force. Meanwhile, student Inca Kasugatane uses her extraordinary sense of smell to detect the smell of a house about to burst into flames. She gathers her accomplices and they make their way to the place, preparing to rob the property once it catches fire. Subsequently, the First Pillar appears to Inca, arousing her interest. Suddenly, the houses inside the area start to catch fire. As the 8th brigade rushes to the scene, Obi mentions the existence of the student that he suspects she may be the Fifth Pillar. The brigade arrives and splits to face the Infernals who are creating the fires. Shinra is tasked with finding Inca and Arthur to stop Haumea. Haumea finds Inca and sends Charon to get her, but Shinra arrives and engages in a fierce battle with Charon. Shinra tries to convince Inca to join the Fire Force, but she rejects her. Meanwhile, an Infernal demon appears overwhelming the Fire Force.
13	April 17, 2018	978-4-06-511245-8	December 24, 2018	978-1-63236-664-1
106. "Second Generation" (第二世代, Dai Ni Sedai); 107. "The Corna" (悪魔の型(コルナ), Koruna); 108. "Licht’s Secret Plan" (リヒトの秘策, Rihito no Hisaku); 109. "The Moment of Truth" (正念場, Shōnenba); 110. "The Time to Choose" (選択の時, Sentaku no Toki); 111. "The First Step to the Next Step" (次への一歩, Tsugi he no Ippō); 112. "Voyage to the Unknown" (未知への船出, Michi he no Funade); 113. "The Outside World" (外の世界, Soto no Sekai); 114. "Road to the Oasis" (楽園(オアシス)への道, Oashisu he no Michi)
Shinra finally manages to focus his attack and take down Charon, but not defeat him. Licht suggests using the power of the second generation to channel the flames into the town square where they are controlled by Maki and transformed into a spiraling firestorm. Vulcan and Obi force the demon to the center of the firestorm where he is sucked into its vortex. Karim then freezes the column, extinguishing the flames. Shinra tries to get Inca to join him, but she decides to stick with the white hoods instead. After the recent events, Obi announces that Shinra, Arthur, Tamaki and Victor will be part of a joint operation with Takeru Noto and Ogun Montgomery of the other brigades under the command of Curt Co Pan, with the aim of investigating the Great Cataclysm of 250 years ago hoping to obtain information on the Adolla Bursts and the Evangelist's motivations in collecting the eight Pillars. The research will be conducted outside the Tokyo Empire on the Chinese peninsula. The team arrives in Avalon, on the Asian mainland. They are suddenly attacked by a giant worm-like beast and a talking mole jumps into their vehicle for safety. The mole, Scop, offers to guide them to his home, an oasis near the space rift that has since been occupied by the invaders. Along the way, they meet Scop's friend, Yata, a talking crow, and that night the team witnesses a multitude of Infernals wandering the countryside.
14	August 17, 2018	978-4-06-511615-9	February 19, 2019	978-1-63236-721-1
115. "The Oasis" (楽園(オアシス), Oashisu); 116. "Holy Ground" (聖なる地, Seinaru Chi); 117. "Smoldering Malevolence" (燃え潜む悪意, Moe Hisomu Akui); 118. "Ringleader" (統率者, Tōsotsusha); 119. "The Mystery of the Tabernacle" (御神体の謎, Goshintai no Nazo); 120. "At the Core" (核心, Kakushin); 121. "1 Second/250 Years" (一秒/弍佰伍拾年, Ichi Byō/Nihyaku Gojū Nen); 122. "The Woman in Black" (黒の女, Kuro no Onna); 123. "Moving Shadows" (影が差す, Kage ga Sasu)
When the team arrives at the oasis, Yata shows Shinra the Tabernacle, an Amaterasu similar to that of the Tokyo Empire. Scop explains the story of the Tabernacle and how a woman dressed in black taught them to speak and repaired the structure. Suddenly the group is attacked by a group of sentient Infernals led by a demon called Tempe. Pan, Victor and Arthur enter the Tabernacle to investigate, while Tempe reveals that his intention is to kill himself and ascend to Heaven by blowing up the Tabernacle, and this will also destroy the surrounding forest and region. Inside the Tabernacle, Pan and Victor attempt to decode the numbers engraved on the tablets and walls, when Arthur suddenly finds a solution. Shinra makes contact with the woman dressed in black, who can only provide him with a second of grace. Shinra accepts the offer and uses it to kill Tempe and discovers that his body travels at the speed of light making time run backwards. The woman in black then tells Shinra that she was inflamed by an Adolla Burst from an Evangelist's bug, and then she used her energy to create the oasis for the animals. The group deduces that the Amaterasu in Tokyo, controlled by the Sacred Sol Temple and the Haijima, is also likely powered by a human, but that it was an involuntary sacrifice. They also suspect that the Evangelist intends to sacrifice the eight pillars and use Amaterasu to kick off a second great cataclysm. After completing their mission, the group returns to the Tokyo Empire and reports to Obi, but are frustrated when Obi reports that Headquarters has recommended that no action be taken for three years while the church evaluates the information. Joker asks Benimaru if he wants to go against the church to find out the truth about what they are hiding and Benimaru accepts.
15	November 17, 2018	978-4-06-513252-4	April 30, 2019	978-1-63236-722-8
124. "Antihero" (ダークヒーロー, Dāku Hīrō); 125. "Shadows Cast by Divine Light" (神光が生む影, Shinkō ga Umu Kage); 126. "In the Sun’s Shadow" (太陽の影で, Taiyō no Kage de); 127. "Sparks of Battle" (戦線着火, Sensen Chakka); 128. "The Collective and the Individual" (集と個, Shū to Ko); 129. "A Pair of One-Eyes" (対の隻眼, Tsui no Sekigan); 130. "Concealed Truth" (秘されし真実, Hisareshi Shinjitsu); 131. "Seeker" (探求者, Tankyūsha); 132. "Trust and Truth" (信頼と真実, Shinrai to Shinjitsu)
Joker and Shinmon stage a frontal attack on the imperial seat. Joker reveals that he is a former member of the church's assassination branch, as he confronts his former commander, leaving Shinmon to fight off other enemies. Joker kills his opponent, while Burns emerges from the shadows. Burns and Joker discuss the time they experienced an Adolla Link, being transported to a different dimension where they lost an eye. Burns gives the Joker the diary of Raffles I's wife, who after years of investigation he believes is the only document detailing the events of the Great Catastrophe and the founding of the Tokyo Empire. Meanwhile, Yona reveals to Inca that she impersonated Raffles I and created the Temple of the Holy Sun on the orders of the Evangelist. Joker then turns his attention to Haijima Industries which he believes must be related to the Evangelist. At the brigade headquarters, Lisa arrives after her release from the hospital and everyone learns of the results of Shinmon and Joker's investigation. Victor is called to Hajima Industries following his report on the expedition to the Chinese peninsula. He meets the president of the company, Gureo Haijima, who asks him to bring Shinra to them. Victor reveals to the brigade that he is a Haijima spy, but they already know it. He divulges Haijima's plan to capture Shinra which he sees as an opportunity to investigate their connection with the Evangelist. Shinra agrees to accompany Victor to the Haijima as the brigade prepares to support him.
16	April 17, 2019	978-4-06-514878-5; 978-4-06-515674-2 (SP)	June 25, 2019	978-1-63236-789-1
133. "The Wicked Overdog" (邪悪な強者, Jāku na Kyōsha); 134. "The Truth of the Sandbox" (箱庭の真相, Hakoniwa no Shinsō); 135. "Ashen Death" (灰の死神, Hai no Shinigami); 136. "Battle in Enemy Territory" (敵陣戦闘, Tekijin Sentō); 137. "The Angel vs. The Witch" (天使vs.魔女, Tenshi vs. Majo); 138. "Trusting Hearts" (信じる心, Shinjiru Kokoro); 139. "Three-Way Battle" (三色混戦, Sanshoku Konsen); 140. "A Woman’s Battle" (女の闘い, Onna no Tatakai); 141. "Keep Away" (争奪戦, Sōdatsusen)
At Hajima, experiments on promising children continue, involving Nataku Son, who was turned into a pyrokinete by Rekka Hoshimiya's insect. Nataku is forced to fight Yūichiro Kurono. On the way to the Haijima facility, Shinra remembers his bitter experience with the bully Kurono when he was held in factories for 7 to 12 years. Shinra enters the facility and feels a connection with Nataku through the Adolla Link as he is guided into a training room to face Kurono. While Victor is at Haijima's research facility, he realizes that Nataku's Adolla Burst has been awakened. He releases Shinra from the training room and together they search for Nataku as the brigade rushes to their rescue. Meanwhile, Kurono stops Nataku and searches for the weakest of the brigade to destroy, but is thwarted by the intervention of Arthur and Shinra. The White Hoods watch these events unfold and Charon intercepts Kurono so they can capture Nataku, who is revealed to be the Sixth Pillar. The sides continue to fight for custody of Nataku until one of the White Hoods, Ritsu, traps the child in a giant Hell. On the orders of the president of the Hajima, Kurono sides with the brigade to save him.
17	July 17, 2019	978-4-06-515081-8	November 26, 2019	978-1-63236-790-7
142. "Mind Blown" (爆発する心, Bakuhatsu-suru Kokoro); 143. "The Legend of the Legendary Holy Sword" (伝説の聖剣の伝説, Densetsu no Seiken no Densetsu); 144. "Pressure" (重圧(プレッシャー), Puresshā); 145. "The Body as Shield" (その身は盾, Sono Mi wa Tate); 146. "Boys, Don’t Be Ambitious" (少年よ、弱くあれ, Shōnen yo, Yowakuare); 147. "Oath" (宣誓, Sensei); 148. "The Holy Woman’s Anguish" (聖女の苦悩, Seijo no Kunō); 149. "The Rewards of Devotion" (献身の報い, Kenshin no Mukui); 150. "Sunflower" (向日葵, Himawari)
Instigated by Haumea, Nataku loses control, attacking everyone with energy beams. Charon intercepts one before he can hit Shinra, who attacks the colossus in vain. He therefore tries to calm the child, with whom he has an Adolla Link. Nataku emits a huge beam of energy which is deflected by Charon, while Kurono manages to bring down the Infernal and calm the child. The White Hoods retreat, deciding to leave Nataku under Kurono's care, as the only one able to control him. Later, Shinra, Ōbi and Viktor meet up with Gureo Haijima, who admits to knowing that Amaterasu is powered by a human, which is why the Haijima are looking for a person who owns the Adolla Burst to create another version of it. Vulcan interrupts and announces that he can design a unit that does not require a human power source. Haijima agrees to finance him in exchange for ownership and offers to help the brigade in their search against the Evangelist who poses a threat to the profitability of industries. The brigade returns to battle the Hellions, but Iris needs to baptize a new batch of equipment and Shinra offers to accompany her to the central church of the Tokyo Empire, known as the church of baptism. Iris takes Shinra to the cemetery where the clergy are buried and reveals her doubts about the value of the church and whether it was really created by the Evangelist. Suddenly a priest catches fire and Shira puts him to rest. Shinra eventually restores Iris's faith by reminding her that the Sun is beyond the Evangelist and the church.
18	August 16, 2019	978-4-06-515309-3	April 21, 2020	978-1-63236-834-8
151. "The Man, Assault" (男、突撃(アサルト), Otoko, Asaruto); 152. "The Oze Family" (尾瀬一門, Oze Ichimon); 153. "Orders" (指令, Shirei); 154. "Chosen Path" (選ぶ道, Erabu Michi); 155. "Dive Into the Darkness" (闇に潜る, Yami ni Moguru); 156. "Flags" (旗(フラグ), Furagu); 157. "Battle of Resolve" (決意の攻防, Ketsui no Kōbō); 158. "Juggernaut" (破壊兵器(ジャガーノート), Jagānōto); 159. "Enemy Contact" (接敵, Setteki)
Assault undergoes hard training to defeat Tamaki, but when he comes to the confrontation he realizes that he has developed feelings for her. The next day, Tajik Oze, Maki's brother, and his companion descend into one of the underground tunnels to track down and reach a room that appears to be a laboratory containing cans of Infernal insects. Suddenly, a white cape appears wearing a bomb belt and detonates himself, injuring the two investigators. Following the injury to his son, General Oze decides that the military must intervene in the activities of the Evangelist. He instructs the Honda commander of the second brigade to investigate the Nether and he requests the assistance of the eighth brigade. However, Maki is ordered to return to the army by her father for her safety and she reluctantly obeys. Victor suggests simultaneous raids into the Nether to surprise enemies. Due to their previous experience, each member of the octave is assigned to accompany each of the units of the second to carry out the investigation. The firefighters are attacked by Ritsu, who commands a large group of Infernals reanimated from the bodies left behind during the Great Cataclysm. The team suffers a number of casualties which Ritsu then adds to her army. Meanwhile, platoon leader Amon Hajiki uses his heat seeking eyes and sniper skills to destroy all the Infernals attacking their team, however he is suddenly killed by Orochi of the Purple Smoke Knights, who attacks Tamaki by taking slowly gaining the upper hand. Juggernaut overcomes his fears and attacks Orochi to save Tamaki, but the enemy cuts off Juggernaut's enormous uniform, who eventually finds his strength and at the cost of an arm and a leg launches a huge firebomb at close range, that destroys Orochi. Hinawa and Takigi are attacked by Iron of the Knights of Purple Smoke, while Shinra runs into Dr Giovanni.
19	September 17, 2019	978-4-06-516449-5	August 25, 2020	978-1-63236-908-6
160. "Human and Bug Powers Combined" (人蟲合力, Jinchū Gōriki); 161. "Fighting Words" (口論闘争, Kōron Tōsō); 162. "He Who Carries the Weight" (背負う者, Seō Mono); 163. "A Plot for Extinction" (亡命の企み, Bōmetsu no Takurami); 164. "When Duty Calls" (責務, Sekimu); 165. "Last-Witch Attempt" (死中に魔女を求む, Shichū ni Majō wo Motomu); 166. "Tracing the Connection" (繋がりを辿る, Tsunagari wo Tadoru); 167. "A Man of Honor" (任侠の漢, Ninkyō no Otoko); 168. "Mirror to Mirror" (合わせ鏡, Awase Kagami)
As Juggernaut lies badly wounded, Tamaki defeats the remaining Hellions, but is then attacked by two other enemies. Fortunately she is saved by the arrival of Honda and Obi. Elsewhere, Dr. Giovanni reveals to Shinra that the laboratory they found was a trap set to lure firefighters to the Nether so they could be defeated. Giovanni has genetically transformed his body to incorporate insect characteristics and starts attacking Shira until Arthur joins him. Licht deduces that the enemies intend to destroy the Nether's underground structures, sinking the Tokyo Empire into the ground. He suggests that Maki may have the power to redirect the explosion even though they could all be incinerated underground. Maki prepares for the challenge, against his brother's objections. Ritsu initiates the explosions, and Maki and Tajik work together to redirect the flames to the lower levels of the Nether, neutralizing them. Giovanni escapes turning into a myriad of insects after Arthur cuts off his head. The survivors return to the surface and Honda acknowledges the effort of the 8th Brigade, stating that the Fire Force and the army must unite to defeat the Evangelist. Maki returns to the brigade, with the reluctant acceptance of her brother and father. Shinra and Hibana visit Konro to discuss his possible connection via the Adolla Link. Konro then explains that he experienced Adolla two years earlier, when he fought a demon who looked like a doppelganger of himself. Benimaru invites Shinra and Arthur for another workout, to which Tamaki is added, tired of being a burden to others.
20	October 17, 2019	978-4-06-517158-5	November 3, 2020	978-163236-986-4
169. "Intensive Training" (鍛錬, Tanren); 170. "Why Do I...?" (なぜ私は, Naze Watashi wa); 171. "Firecat" (炎猫, Enbyō); 172. "The Hysterical Strength of the Fight-or-Flight Response" (火事場の馬鹿力, Kajiba no Bakajikara); 173. "Think of Death" (死を想え, Shi wo Omoe); 174. "Signs of Upheaval" (激動の兆し, Gekidō no Kizashi); 175. "At the Center of Faith" (信仰の中心で, Shinkō no Chūshin de); 176. "Trial of Faith" (信心を問う, Shinjin wo Tō); 177. "Unwavering Conviction" (不退転, Futaiten)
Shinmon instructs Tamaki to see if he can take care of the twin sisters Hikage and Hinata, who decide to play tag. Tamaki doesn't take the game seriously at first, but after being beaten up by the sisters, she draws on her determination to push her skills to the point of beating them. Shinra and Arthur continue their strange training with Shinmon, in order to reach a new level in the mastery of their power. Shinmon pushes them to fight, but after hours of intense fighting he still defeats them with little effort. Shinra has used up almost all of the oxygen in his body and enters a semi-conscious state facing death, but his survival instinct kicks in and experiences an Adolla Link while covered in blue flames. Meanwhile, Konro receives a visit from Hibana and Company 6 Captain Kayoko Huang, who examines him and determines that an Adolla Link is still present in those who have a scar from their contact with Adolla. Assuming that the enemies are attacking others marked, Hibana prepares to warn Captain Hague, but he is killed in his office by a white cape with a golden hand. Meanwhile, Shinra sees his mother and Hague dying through his Adolla Link. The white hoods prepare for a final assault on the Tokyo Empire. Raffles III tells Burns that the empire must join the White Hoods for the sake of the empire and the sun god, and Haumea convinces Burns to join their cause. While delivering a mission report to the head of the fire defense agency, Akitaru is arrested by soldiers from the Tokyo army. After Ōbi's arrest, Company 8 decides to become traitors to the empire to save him.
21	December 17, 2019	978-4-06-518063-1; 978-4-06-518064-8 (SP)	January 26, 2021	978-164651-041-2
178. "Prisoner" (囚われの身, Toraware no Mi); 179. "Dark Communion" (闇の密談, Yami no Mitsudan); 180. "The Destroyers" (屠リ人, Hofuri Bito); 181. "Flame Incarnate" (炎の化身, Honō no Keshin); 182. "Death and Flame" (死と炎, Shi to Honō); 183. "Strike Gold" (黄金を射て, Ōgon wo Ute); 184. "The Golden Secret" (黄金の秘密, Ōgon no Himitsu); 185. "Battle Experiment" (実験戦闘, Jikken Sentō); 186. "Old Enemies Reunited" (宿敵邂逅, Shūteki Kaikō)
Victor takes the company to the Joker. Inside their secret hideout, Shinra has an Adolla Link with Burns and discovers that the White Hoods intend to use a hellish bug on Ōbi, prompting him and the Joker to leave for Fuchū's prison. There, they find Burns chaining Ōbi, and Shinra and Joker attack him together. The rest of the brigade reaches the prison and confronts them with the butchers, the branch of the assassins of the White Hoods. They manage to beat Gold with team play, while Arthur, previously separated from the others, defeats Stream with ease. Following this fact, Dragon, the head of the butchers, decides to take the field personally. His name, his inhuman arrogance and his powers excite Arthur, thus pushing him to reach new heights of strength.
22	March 17, 2020	978-4-06-518779-1	April 6, 2021	978-164651-190-7
187. "At Prayers’ End" (祈りの果て, Inori no Hate); 188. "Armor of Steel" (鋼の鎧, Hagane no Yoroi); 189. "The Dragon and the Knight" (竜と騎士, Ryū to Kishi); 190. "The Strong" (強き者, Tsuyoki Mono); 191. "Forerunners and Aftrunners" (先達と後進, Sendatsu to Kōshin); 192. "Hold True to Your Pride" (意地を貫け, Ishi wo Tsuranuke); 193. "The Hero and the Lion" (英雄(ヒーロー)と獅子, Hīrō to Shishi); 194. "Indomitable" (不撓不屈, Futōfukutsu); 195. "Sudden Turn" (事態急転, Jitai Kyūten)
The White Hoods try to use the bug on Obi, but Obi resists by flexing his muscles. Arthur fights against Dragon, but the opponent proves to be immensely superior. Stimulated by the fight, Arthur strengthens Excalibur to the maximum, but not even in this state he manages to hurt the opponent and the sword breaks. Arthur collapses to the ground defeated and falls unconscious. The fight between Shinra and Burns continues, and Shinra focuses on constantly increasing his speed to overcome Burns' power. Finally gaining an Adolla Link, Shinra collides with Burns for the last time and ultimately wins the fight. Burns praises Shinra for his strength and asks him to challenge the world. Something a dogmatic veteran could never achieve, but is suddenly impaled by his doppelgänger's horn as he emerges from the shadows. Dragon tries to annihilate the company, but his attack is canceled by Iris and the white cloaks realize that she is the eighth pillar. As they are about to attack, the enemies are stopped by the masked Benimaru.
23	May 15, 2020	978-4-06-518848-4	July 6, 2021	978-164651-209-6
196. "Moonlight Rescue" (月光の救い, Gekkō no Sukui); 197. "Farewell" (告別, Kokubetsu); 198. "Flower Garden Memories" (花園の記憶, Hanazono no Kioku); 199. "Slumbering Truth" (眠る真実, Nemuru Shinjitsu); 200. "Holy Mother of Darkness" (闇の聖母, Yami no Seibo); 201. "Little Demons" (小鬼, Ko-Oni); 202. "The Knight King’s Grand Adventure" (騎士王の大冒険, Kishi-Ō no Daibōken); 203. "Soon They Discover..." (見出すモノは, Miidasu mono wa); 204. "Clan of the Knight King" (騎士王の一族, Kishi-Ō no Ichizoku)
24	July 17, 2020	978-4-06-518063-1	September 28, 2021	978-164651-282-9
205. "The Holy Sword Reborn" (聖剣再誕, Seiken Saitan); 206. "Connection" (繋がる, Tsunagaru); 207. "Escape" (脱出, Dasshutsu); 208. "Apocalypse Assembly" (終末集会, Shūmatsu Shūkai); 209. "Covert Warfare" (暗闘, Antō); 210. "Advent" (出現, Shutsugen); 211. "At the Base of the Pillar" (柱の下に, Hashira no Shita ni); 212. "Cooperation" (協調, Kyōchō); 213. "Midair Battle" (空中武闘, Kuchū Butō)
25	September 17, 2020	978-4-06-520595-2; 978-4-06-521156-4 (SP)	December 21, 2021	978-164651-283-6
214. "The Great Kaiju Battlefront" (大怪獣戦線, Daikaijū Sensen); 215. "Set Alight" (点火, Tenka); 216. "Ancient Madness" (古の狂気, Inishie no Kyōki); 217. "Self-Unaware" (無自覚, Mujikaku); 218. "Shadow’s Form" (影の形, Kage no Katachi); 219. "Misdeed" (過ち, Ayamachi); 220. "Father of the Proto-Nationalist " (原国の父, Genkoku no Chichi); 221. "Asakusa Style" (浅草の流儀, Asakusa no Ryūgi); 222. "Company 1 Returns" (第1再起, Dai Ichi Saiki)
26	November 17, 2020	978-4-06-521279-0	March 22, 2022	978-164651-419-9
223. "The Rambunctious Brat Sets Out" (暴れん坊、出る, Abarenbō, Deru); 224. "The Sun and the Moon" (太陽と月, Taiyō to Tsuki); 225. "Childish Moonlight" (幼き月光, Osanaki Gekkō); 226. "The Burden Bearer’s Fate" (背負った末に, Seotta Sue ni); 227. "Unfinished Business" (心残り, Kokoronokori); 228. "A Souvenir for the Afterlife" (冥土の土産, Meido no Miyage); 229. "The Sun Wheel at His Back" (日輪を背に, Nichirin wo Se ni); 230. "The Cataclysm Marches On" (災害進行, Saigai Shinkō); 231. "Origins" (出生, Shussei)
27	February 17, 2021	978-4-06-522169-3	July 5, 2022	978-164651-420-5
232. "Mari Kusakabe" (万里 日下部); 233. "Guardian Angel" (守護天使, Shugotenshi); 234. "The Eighth Pillar" (八本目, Happon-me); 235. "Savior" (救世主, Kyūseishu); 236. "Reunion" (再会, Saikai); 237. "Hero" (ヒーロー, Hīrō); 238. "He’s A…" (その姿は, Sono Sugata wa); 239. "Vanished Hero" (消えたヒーロー, Kieta Hīrō); 240. "At the Center of the World" (世界の中心で, Sekai no Chūshin de)
28	April 16, 2021	978-4-06-522882-1	August 16, 2022	978-164651-520-2
241. "The Way of the Guardian" (守リ人の道, Mori Bito no Michi); 242. "Unbroken Heritage" (紡いだ系譜, Tsumuida Keifu); 243. "Back in the Day" (あのころ俺たちは, Ano Koro Ore-tachi wa); 244. "Bind the Ties" (絆を繋げ, Kizuna wo Tsunage); 245. "The Dragon and the Knight: Rematch" (龍と騎士、再戦, Ryū to Kishi, Saisen); 246. "The Magic Words for Destruction" (滅びの呪文, Horobi no Jumon); 247. "250-Year Obsession" (弐佰伍拾年の執念, Nihyaku Gojū Nen no Shūnen); 248. "Fallen Life" (散らす命, Chirasu Inochi); 249. "Waiting on the Other Side of Despair" (絶望の先に待つ, Zetsubō no Saki ni Matsu)
29	June 17, 2021	978-4-06-523577-5	November 15, 2022	978-164651-521-9
250. "Those Who Fight the Fight" (抗う者たち, Aragau Mono-tachi); 251. "The Shield Breaks Into Laughter" (盾は砕け笑う, Tate wa Kudake Warau); 252. "The Image of the End" (終末想像(イメージ), Shūmatsu Imēji); 253. "The Shadow Feeds" (影が喰らう, Kage ga Kurau); 254. "Where Hope Is" (希望の在処, Kibo no Arika); 255. "She Who Is the Seventh Pillar" (七柱目の女, Nana Hashira-me no Onna); 256. "Reunion with the Illusion" (幻影の再開, Gen’ei no Saikai); 257. "Hot-Blooded Despair-Loving Jackass" (熱血絶望野郎, Nekketsu Zetsubō Yarō); 258. "An Ordeal to Save the World" (世界を救う試練, Sekai wo Sukū Shiren)
30	August 17, 2021	978-4-06-524488-3	December 20, 2022	978-164651-522-6
259. "My Friend" (友よ, Tomo yo); 260. "Fire and Ice, the True Story" (氷炎、偽りなく, Hyōen, Itsuwarinaku); 261. "The Knight King Rises" (騎士王が立つ, Kishi-Ō ga Tatsu); 262. "A Vow Upon a Sword" (誓いを剣に, Chikai wo Ken ni); 263. "Battle of Mythic Proportions" (神話の戦い, Shinwa no Tatakai); 264. "He Who Transcends" (超越者, Chōetsusha); 265. "Just Dragon and Knight, Defying Gravity" (竜騎衝天, Ryūki Shōten); 266. "Unrestrainable Battle" (制限不可の戦い, Seigen-fuka no Tatakai); 267. "The Knight of the Cosmos" (宇宙(そら)の騎士, Sora no Kishi)
31	October 15, 2021	978-4-06-525138-6	February 21, 2023	978-164651-634-6
268. "The Knight King’s Battle Accouterments (騎士王の戦装束, Kishi-Ō no Ikusa Shōzoku); 269. "Those Whose Names Are Immortalized" (名を刻む者たち, Na wo Kizamu Mono-tachi); 270. "Imbued Within the Sword" (剣に何を宿す, Tsurugi ni Nani wo Yadosu); 271. "Death Is Hope" (死は希望なり, Shi wa Kibōnari); 272. "The Knight King" (騎士王, Kishi-Ō); 273. "Return of the Hero" (ヒーロー復活, Hīrō Fukkatsu); 274. "A Savior and His Guardian Angel" (救世主と守護天使, Kyūseishu to Shugotenshi); 275. "Death Smiles" (死神が笑う, Shinigami ga Warau); 276. "Cheap Imitation" (マガイモノ, Magaimono); 277. "Rip-off or Homage?" (パクリかオマージュか, Pakuri ka Omāju ka)
32	December 17, 2021	978-4-06-526283-2	April 25, 2023	978-164651-694-0
278. "Humbly Setting Off" (参る, Mairu); 279. "An Oppressive Assault" (突撃(アサルト)、制圧, Asaruto, Seiatsu); 280. "Lucky Lecher Lure" (ラッキースケベられ, Rakki Sukebe-rare); 281. "Lechery Is Priceless" (スケベ尊し, Sukebe Tōtoshi); 282. "The Grandeur of Eroticism" (エロは偉大なり, Ero wa Idai-nari); 283. "The Shadow of the Trump Card" (切り札の影, Kirifuda no Kage); 284. "The Toughest vs. The Maddest" (最強vs.最狂, Saikyō vs. Saikyō); 285. "Battle to Determine the Toughest" (最強決定戦, Saikyō Ketteisen); 286. "Diving Through the Gates of Death" (死地に潜る, Shichi ni Moguru)
33	March 17, 2022	978-4-06-526890-2	June 20, 2023	978-164651-695-7
287. "The Saintess of Despair" (絶望の聖女, Zetsubō no Seijo); 288. "What Is Salvation?" (救いとは, Sukui to wa); 289. "Joined as One" (一つとなりて, Hitotsu to Narite); 290. "Penetrating Hope" (穿たれた希望, Ugatareta Kibō); 291. "Into a Second Sun" (第二の太陽に, Dai Ni no Taiyō ni); 292. "The Fourth Time" (四回目, Yonkai-me); 293. "The Kusakabe Family" (日部部家, Kusakabe-ke); 294. "Despair vs. Hope" (絶望vs.希望, Zetsubō vs. Kibō); 295. "Here to Save the Day" (見参, Genzan)
34	May 17, 2022	978-4-06-528055-3	October 3, 2023	978-164651-800-5
296. "Shinra Bansho Man" (森羅万象マン); 297. "Big Bang of Hope" (希望ビッグバン, Kibō Bigguban); 298. "O God" (神よ, Kami yo); 299. "The Answer" (答え, Kotae); 300. "Only One Way" (ただ一つの術, Tada Hitotsu no Sube); 301. "Choosing a Future" (選び取る未来, Erabitoru Mirai); 302. "God’s Judgment" (神の裁定, Kami no Saitei); Epilogue 1: "A World Without Human Combustion" (人体発火なき世界, Jintai Hakka Naki Sekai); Epilogue 2: "The Hero's Tale" (ヒーローの物語, Hīrō no Monogatari)

== Omnibus edition ==
No.	Release date	ISBN	Collects
1	November 29, 2022	978-1-64651-547-9	Volumes 1–3
2	January 31, 2023	978-1-64651-548-6	Volumes 4–6
3	March 28, 2023	978-1-64651-549-3	Volumes 7–9
4	May 30, 2023	978-1-64651-550-9	Volumes 10–12
5	July 25, 2023	978-1-64651-551-6	Volumes 13–15
6	September 26, 2023	978-1-64651-892-0	Volumes 16–18
7	September 5, 2023	978-1-64651-902-6	Volumes 19–21
8	February 13, 2024	979-8-88877-037-5	Volumes 22–24
9	March 5, 2024	979-8-88877-038-2	Volumes 25–27
10	May 7, 2024	979-8-88877-039-9	Volumes 28–30
11	July 30, 2024	979-8-88877-040-5	Volumes 31 and 32
12	September 17, 2024	979-8-88877-041-2	Volumes 33 and 34
