= Henri Geirnaert =

Belgian architect, educator and conservationist

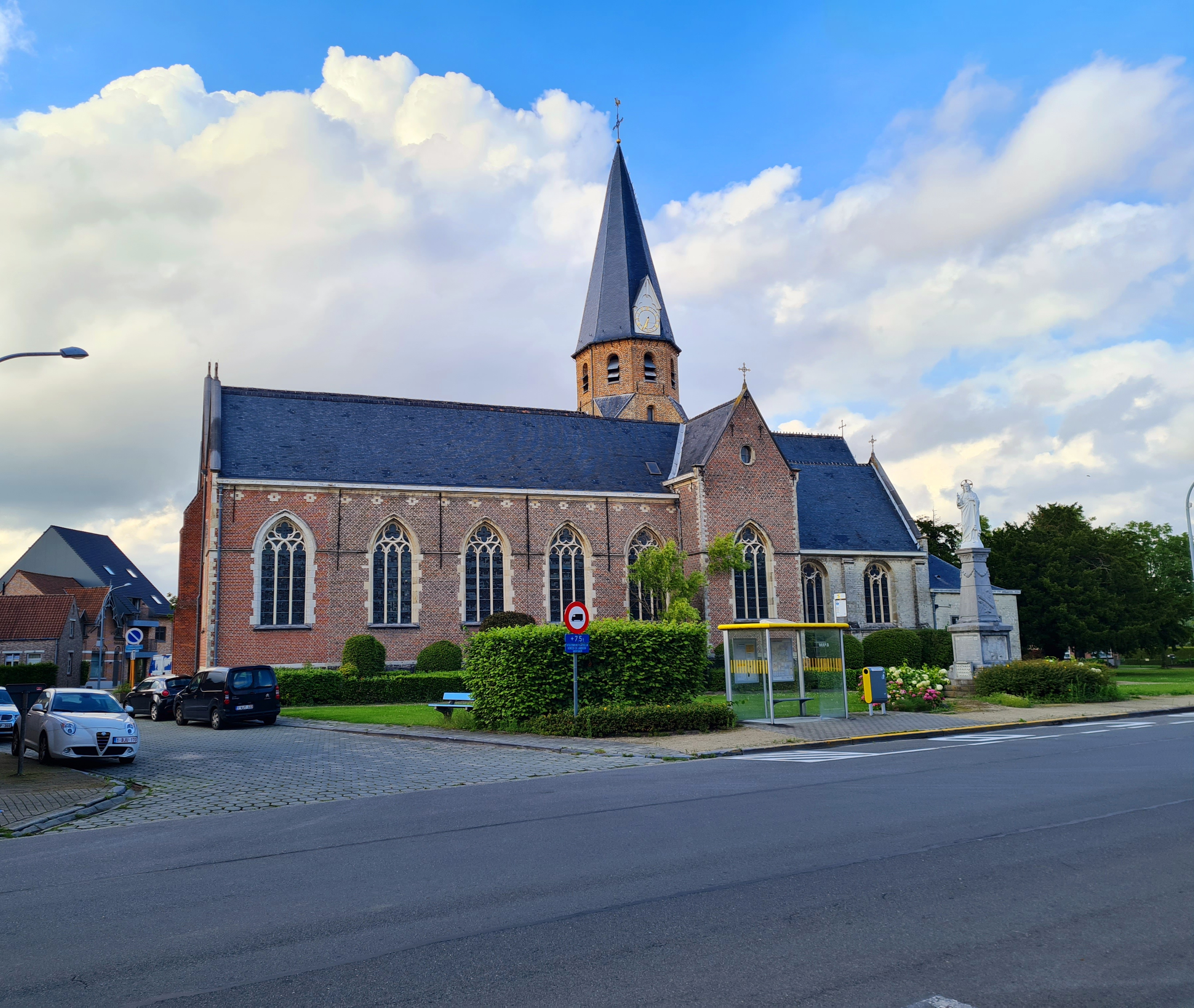
The church of Eksaarde, restored and expanded by Henri Geirnaert in the 1890s

Hendrik Lucianus (Henri) Geirnaert (1860–1928) was a Belgian architect, educator and conservationist, particularly active in building and restoring churches.

== Life ==
Henri Geirnaert was born in Vinderhoute, East Flanders, on 24 February 1860, the son of Pierre Geirnaert, cabinetmaker, and Colette Van Loo. He studied at the Sint-Lucas School of Architecture (1872–1881) and went on to teach there until his death. In conserving and restoring medieval churches, he was a close collaborator of Arthur Verhaegen. He was also a member of the city of Ghent's Commission for Monuments and Landscapes. He died in Ghent on 24 February 1928.

== Works ==
- Church of St Anthony of Padua, Ghent (1898–1900)
