= Rond den Heerd =

West Flemish weekly about religion, history, folklore and literature

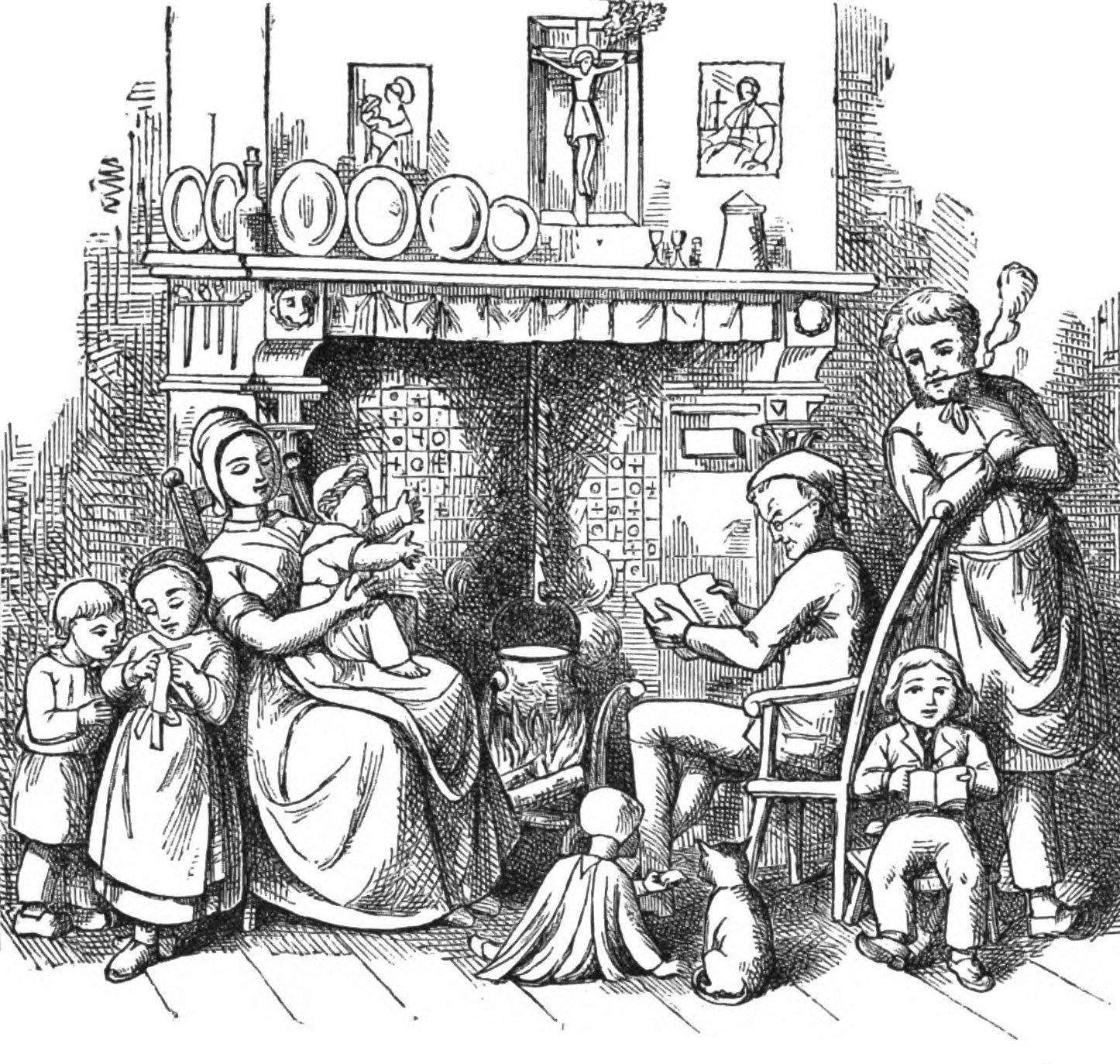
- Illustration from the masthead of Rond den Heerd (1866)
- Frequency: Weekly
- Founder: Guido Gezelle, William Henry James Weale
- Founded: 1865
- Final issue: 1890
- Country: Belgium
- Based in: Bruges
- Language: Flemish

Rond den Heerd ("Around the Hearth") was a weekly Dutch-language family magazine published in Bruges (Belgium) from 1865 to 1890. It was founded by Guido Gezelle and William Henry James Weale. From 1870 the main editor was Adolf Duclos. Editorial disagreements led to the founding of the alternative Biekorf in 1890. Weekly publication of Rond den Heerd ceased, but Duclos continued to produce occasional publications under the title until 1902.

Back issues were reprinted in 1988–1989.
