= Church of St Anthony of Padua, Ghent =

St Anthony of Padua Church
- Rainbow Church
- Dutch: Sint-Antonius van Paduakerk or Regenboogkerk
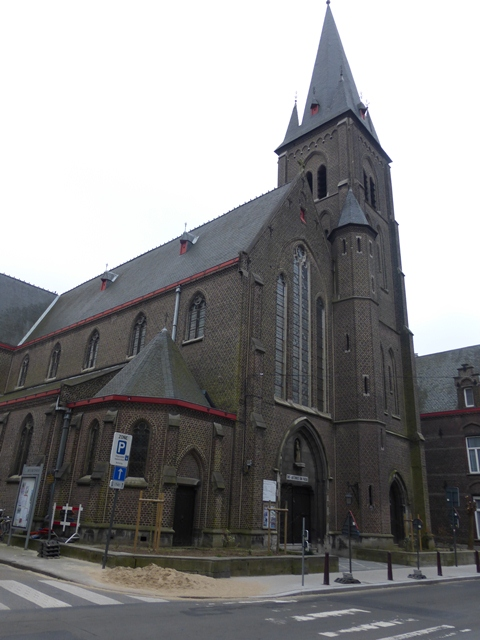
- The church in 2014
- St Anthony of Padua Church
- 51.048005°N 3.742366°E
- Location: Forelstraat, Ghent
- Country: Belgium
- Denomination: Roman Catholic

History
- Status: Active
- Founded: 14 May 1896
- Dedication: Anthony of Padua
- Consecrated: 25 July 1901

Architecture
- Functional status: Parish church
- Heritage designation: Listed
- Designated: 31 December 1983
- Architect: Hendrik Geirnaert
- Style: Neogothic
- Years built: 1898–1900
- Completed: 1900

Administration
- Province: Mechelen–Brussels
- Diocese: Ghent
- Deanery: Ghent

St Anthony of Padua Church (Dutch: Sint-Antonius van Paduakerk) or Rainbow Church (Dutch: Regenboogkerk) is a Catholic church in Ghent, Belgium. It was constructed in Gothic Revival style in the years 1898–1900 to a design by architect Hendrik Geirnaert, as the parish church for the expanding 'Heirnis' section of the city. The new parish was established on 14 May 1896, but the Liberal majority on the local council initially opposed the building of a new church. The church was consecrated on 25 July 1901, by bishop Antoon Stillemans. The organ was built by Brussels organ maker Pierre Scheyven. It has been inventoried as built heritage since 1983.
