= Isidore-Joseph du Rousseaux =

Belgian Catholic bishop (1826–1897)

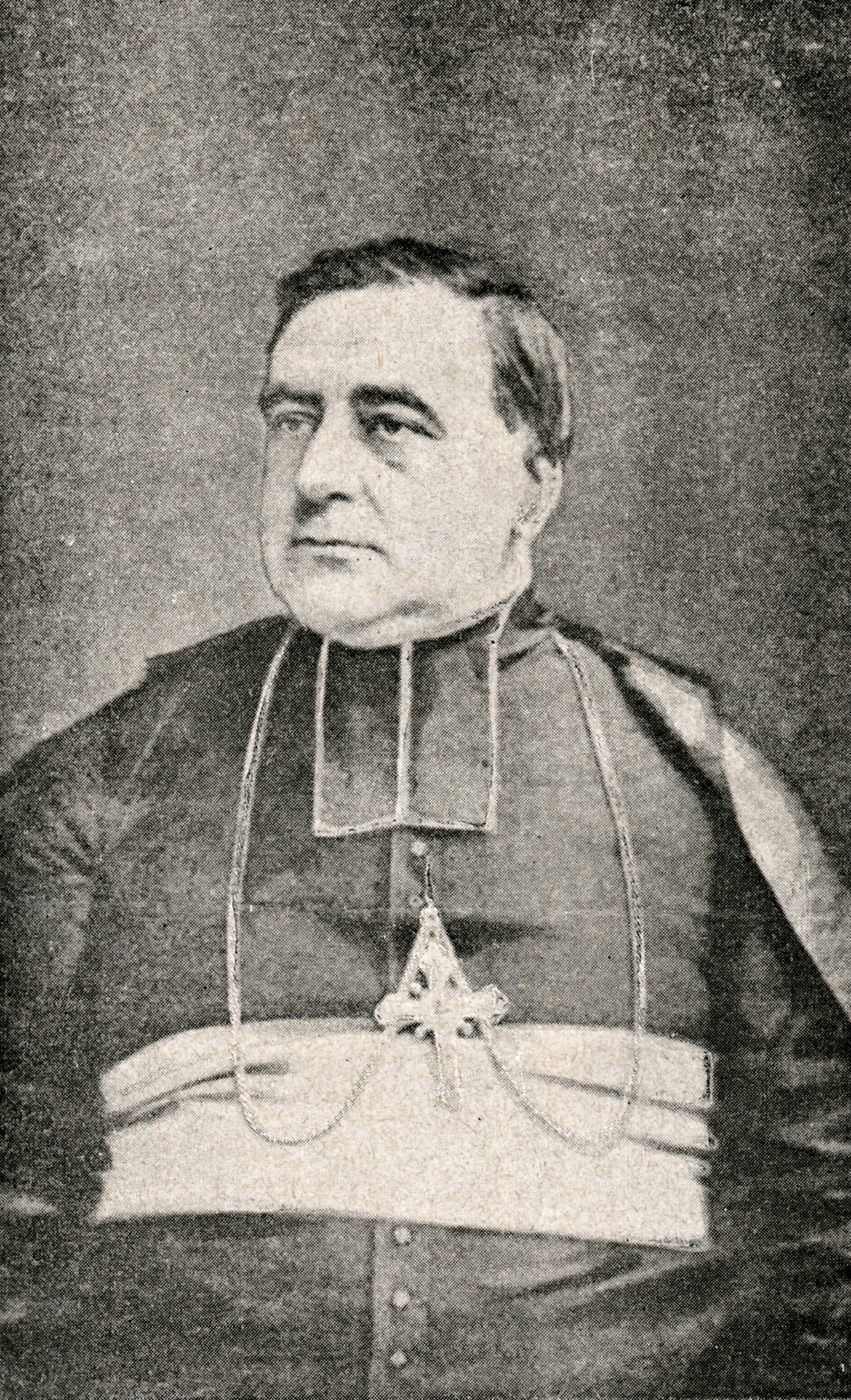
- Diocese: Diocese of Tournai
- See: Notre-Dame de Tournai
- Appointed: 1880
- Predecessor: Edmond Dumont
- Successor: Charles-Gustave Walravens

Orders
- Ordination: 8 September 1849
- Consecration: 1879

Personal details
- Born: 19 January 1826 Halle, Province of Brabant, United Kingdom of the Netherlands
- Died: 23 September 1897 (aged 71) Tournai, Province of Hainaut, Kingdom of Belgium
- Education: Minor Seminary, Mechelen
- Alma mater: Major Seminary, Mechelen
- Motto: Pax vobis

Isidore-Joseph du Rousseaux (1826–1897) was a Belgian Catholic bishop of Tournai.

== Life ==
Rousseaux was born in Halle on 19 January 1826. He was educated in Mechelen and entered the Major Seminary there in 1846. He was ordained priest on 8 September 1849, and was appointed to teach in the junior seminary. He became the director of the school in 1868. He was heavily involved in organising the Catholic Congresses in Mechelen in 1863, 1864, and 1867.

He was appointed apostolic administrator of the diocese of Tournai on 22 November 1879 as titular bishop of Eumenia, and was nominated bishop of Tournai on 12 November 1880. His main concern as bishop was to mollify the partisanship that divided the "liberal" and "ultramontane" clergy of his diocese.

He was instrumental in the 1882 appointment of Désiré-Joseph Mercier to a new Chair of Thomist Philosophy established at the Catholic University of Leuven by papal breve of 25 December 1880.

Rousseaux held two diocesan synods, in 1882 and 1885. He increased the number of parishes in the industrial towns of the coalfields. His concern for the poor and his denunciation of the condition of workers in an 1886 pastoral letter led to him being dubbed "the workers' bishop".

He died in Tournai on 23 September 1897.
