= Arthur Verhaegen =

Belgian architect and politician

Arthur Théodore Verhaegen (31 August 1847 in Brussels – 5 September 1917 in Elsene) was a Gothic Revival Belgian architect and a politician of the Catholic Party, one of the founders of Belgian Christian democracy. He was a grandson of the politician and lawyer Pierre-Théodore Verhaegen.

== Life ==
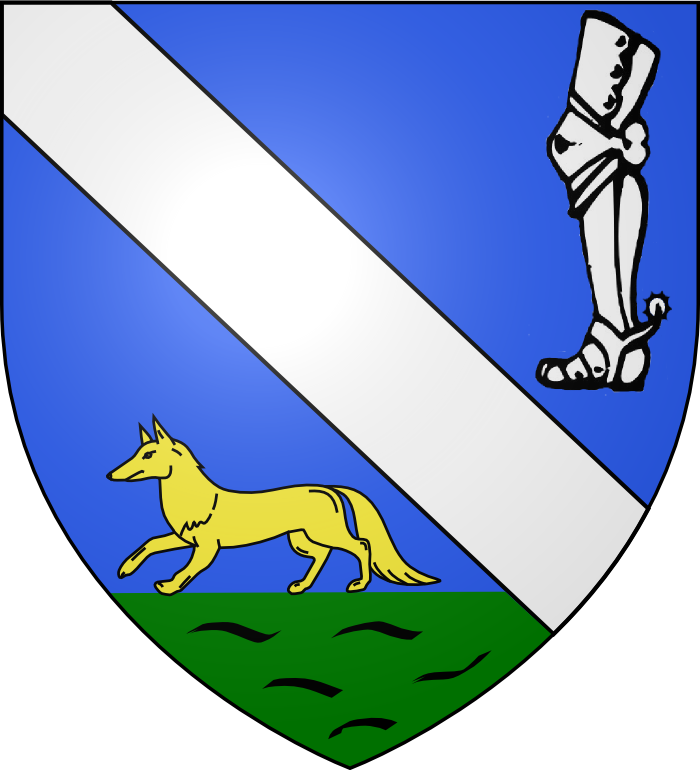
Coat of arms

Verhaegen began his career as a civil engineer at Charleroi. In 1872, after his marriage to Claire Lammens, he moved to Ghent and dedicated himself to arts and crafts in the Gothic Revival style. In 1874 Verhaegen joined the Guild of Saint Thomas and Saint Luke, an association for the study and promotion of medieval art, becoming editor of the guild's Bulletin in 1881 and general secretary in 1884. The guild helped shape his attitudes both to social questions and to arts and crafts.

He played an important role in the restoration of the Gravensteen, the former castle of the counts of Flanders in Ghent, and took part in other restoration projects, as well as being involved in the design of two new churches in Ghent. He worked closely with Henri Geirnaert, who taught at the Sint-Lucas School of Architecture. His writings on architecture, history and art history led to an honorary doctorate from the Catholic University of Leuven.

Verhaegen's concern for social questions led to his active involvement in Catholic social congresses, in founding the newspaper Het Volk, and in the early organisation of Christian Democracy. In the 1890s he became a member of the Belgian Parliament for Eeklo.

During the First World War he remained in occupied Belgium, communicating sensitive military information to the government-in-exile. Discovered, he was put to forced labour by the occupier that broke his health. A few days before Verhaegen's death, the exiled King Albert declared him a baron and a grand officer of the Order of Leopold.

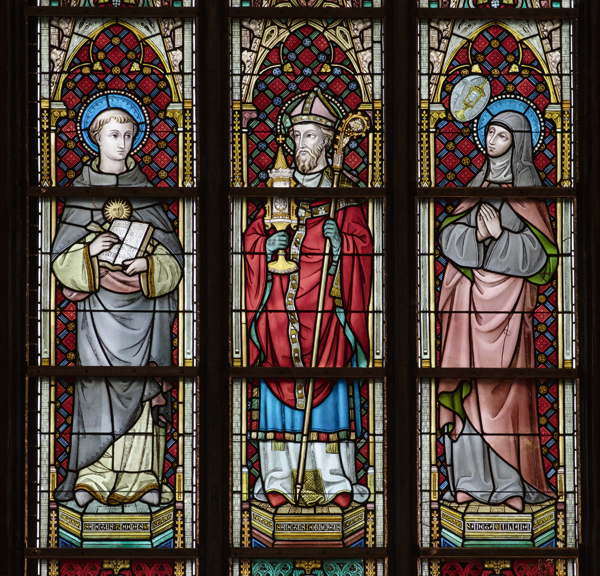
Église Saint-Jacques (Tournai)

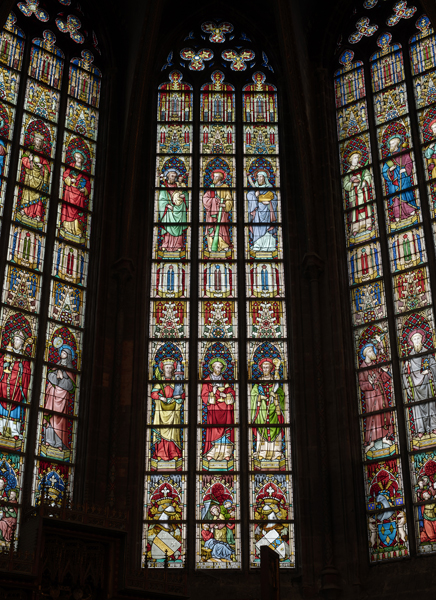
Église Saint-Jacques (Tournai)

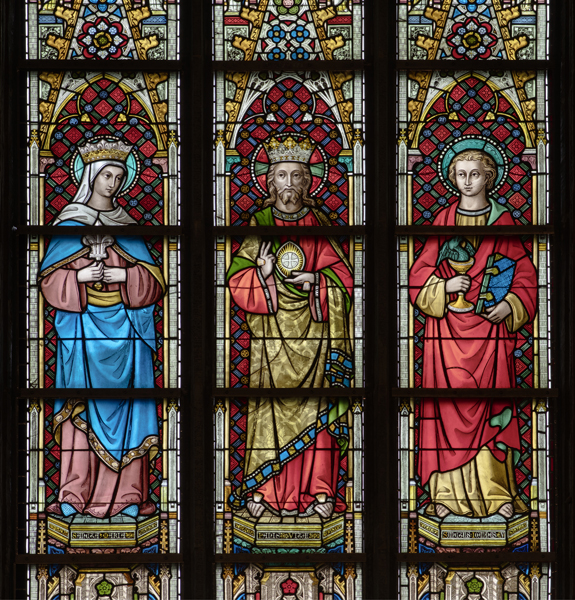
Église Saint-Jacques (Tournai)

== Writings ==
- Les cinquante dernières années de l'ancienne Université de Louvain (1740-1797) (Liège, 1884)
- La manifestation nationale du 7 septembre 1884 à Bruxelles, 1885
- Le service personnel et l'aumônerie militaire, 1886
- L'aumonerie militaire au congrès des oeuvres sociales à Liége, septembre 1887, 1887.
- Beknopt overzicht van enige punten der stadhuishoudkunde
- Une descendance légitime des anciens ducs de Brabant, 1888.
- Monographie de l'église cathédrale du Saint-Sauveur à Bruges (Bruges, 1888)
- L'hôpital de la Biloke à Gand (Ghent, 1889)
  - De bijloke van Gent, opgeluisterd met 43 platen geteekend door de Heeren E. Serrure en A. Van Assche, 1889.
- Le cardinal de Franckenberg, archevêque de Malines, 1728-1804 (Bruges, 1889)
- Antisocialistische werkliedenbond van Gent. Beknopt overzicht van eenige punten der staathuishoudkunde lessen gegeven aan de leden van Gent
- Le minimum de salaire, 1892
- Le minimum de salaire dans les adjudications publiques, 1893
- De vakvereeniging, 1895
- De vakvereeniging, met een model van standregelen en den tekst van de nieuwe wet op de vakvereenigingen met beknopten uitleg, 1895
- Dévotions populaires et croyance en Dieu
- Natuurlijke beginselen en wetten en menschelijke wetten, 1899
- A propos du programme ouvrier des catholiques, 1900
- La question scolaire, 1902
- Soixante-quinzième anniversaire de l'indépendance nationale, 1830, 1905
- Het loon. Lecture given in Leuven during the first social week, 1908
- Het jaar 2000 of de Socialisten in werking door Ed. Bellamy; Uittreksels en bemerkingen
- Toepassing van het katholiek sociaal programma in de werken. Les gegeven te Leuven tijdens de tweede sociale week, in 1909
- Jules Lammens et les oeuvres catholiques. Esquisse biographique, 1909
- Les élections du 22 mai 1910, 1910
- Praktische raadgevingen aan de leiders der arbeiders-vereenigingen, (Les gegeven te Leuven tijdens de derde Sociale Week, in 1910)
- Le suffrage universel pur et simple, 1911
- Eenige lessen over staathuishoudkunde gegeven in 1911 aan de jonge leden van den Antisocialistischen Werkliedenbond van het arrondissement Gent
- Het collectivisme. (Les gegeven te Leuven, tijdens de vierde Sociale week, in 1911)
- Les élections du 2 juin 1912 et la politique libérale, 1912
- Les élections du 24 mai 1914, 1914
- Proposition de loi sur l'affiliation aux unions ouvrières, 1914
- L'État hors de l'École!
- L'hôpital de la Byloke à Gand, monographie publiée sous le patronage de l'État, de la Flandre Orientale et de la ville de Gand
- Les missionnaires belges du Congo,
- Projet de loi relatif à l'amélioration du cours de l'Escaut entre Anvers et le Kruisschans et aux travaux qui en sont la conséquence
- La régie nationale des chemins de fer de l'Etat et l'avant-projet sur l'exploitation des chemins de fer de l'Etat
- Vingt-cinq années d'action sociale

== Bibliography ==
- Paul VAN MOLLE, Het Belgisch parlement, 1894-1972, Antwerp, 1972
- Frans-Jos VERDOODT, "Arthur Verhaegen", in: Nationaal Biografisch Woordenboek, vol. XIII, Brussels, 1990.
- Emmanuel GERARD, De christelijke arbeidersbeweging in België 1891-1991, Leuven, 1991.
- Jan DE MAEYER (ed.), De Sint-Lucasscholen en de neogotiek, 1862-1914, (KADOC-studies, nr. 5), Leuven, 1991.
- Jan DE MAEYER, Arthur Verhaegen (1847-1917), de rode baron (Kadoc Studies, 18), Leuven, 1994.
- Philippe VERHAEGEN, Une vie au souffle de l'esprit, 1995.
- Jan DE MAEYER, "Arthur Verhaegen", in Nieuwe encyclopedie van de Vlaamse Beweging, Tielt, 1998.
- Marie-Pierre D'UDEKEM D'ACOZ, Voor Koning en Vaderland. De Belgische adel in het Verzet, Tielt, 2003.
