= Édouard Ducpétiaux =

Belgian journalist and social reformer (1804–1868)

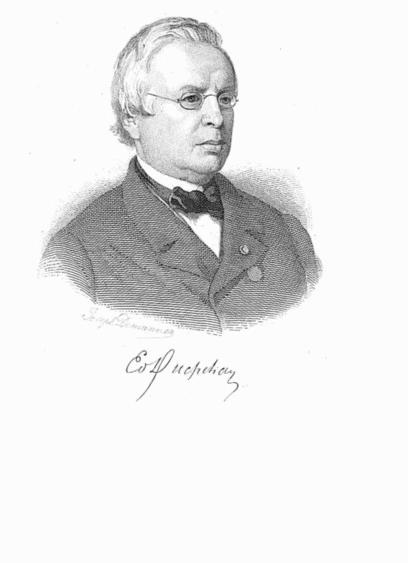
Antoine Édouard Ducpétiaux (1804-1868)

Antoine Édouard Ducpétiaux (29 June 1804, Brussels – 21 July 1868, Brussels) was a Belgian journalist and social reformer.

In 1827 he obtained his doctorate from the University of Ghent, being admitted to the bar in Brussels during the following year. He quickly became known as an opponent of the death penalty and fervent defender of freedom of the press.

He played a significant role in the events of autumn 1830 during the Belgian Revolution. Ducpétiaux was a leading figure in regards to demands made for an immediate break from the Netherlands along with the creation of a provisional government. He served as president of the "Réunion centrale" (Central Assembly), and for a period of time was imprisoned in Antwerp by Dutch authorities (being released on 11 October 1830). Following his release, he resigned from "Réunion centrale" due to differences with other assembly members.

In the same year he was appointed inspector-general of prisons by the provisional government. Among his numerous publications was a three-volume work on penitentiary reform. In the 1840s he introduced projects for eradication of slums (1844, 1846). Later in his career he was involved with Catholic charity projects. He took the lead in organising the first International Statistical Congress (1853) and International Philanthropic Congress (1856) in Brussels, and the Malines Congresses of 1863, 1864 and 1867.

Ducpétiaux was a member of the masonic lodge "Les Vrais Amis de l'union et du progrès réunis" in Brussels. It has also been claimed that he was a member of the elite twelve-member dining club known as the "Société des douze".

== Selected publications ==
- Des progrès et de l'état actuel de réforme pénitentiaire (1837–38, three volumes).
- De la condition physique et morale des jeunes ouvriers (1843, two volumes).
- Budgets économiques des classes ouvrières en Belgique (1855).
- Des conditions d'application du système de l'emprisonnement séparé ou cellulaire (1857).
- La question de la charité et des associations religieuses en Belgique (second edition- 1859).
