= Guild of Saint Thomas and Saint Luke =

The Guild of Saint Thomas and Saint Luke (French: Gilde de St-Thomas et St-Luc), founded in 1863 during the first of the Malines Congresses, was a Belgian association for the study and promotion of Medieval art from a Christian perspective.

== Activities ==
Papers were read at the regular meetings, scholarships were funded, and the guild made an annual study trip. In 1867 the guild organized an exhibition of medieval art in Bruges. Until 1913, it published an annual Bulletin.

== Members ==
The founders, Jean-Baptiste Bethune and William Henry James Weale, were both influential figures in the Gothic Revival in Belgium. The first president of the guild was the clergyman-scholar Charles-Joseph Voisin, with international vice-presidents Joseph Albert Alberdingk Thijm (from the Netherlands) and Franz Johann Joseph Bock (from Germany). Jules Helbig also quickly became an influential member.

Arthur Verhaegen joined the guild in 1874 and helped organise that year's study trip, which was to Hasselt, Maaseik and Diest. In 1881 he became editor of the Bulletin, and in 1884 secretary.

== Publications ==
- Gilde de Saint-Thomas et de Saint-Luc, Bulletin des séances (1871) on Google Books
- Gilde de Saint-Thomas et de Saint-Luc, Bulletin des séances (1874) on Google Books
