= Malines Congresses =

Series of Catholic Congresses held in Mechelen, Belgium

The Malines Congresses were a series of Catholic Congresses held in Mechelen (French: Malines), Belgium, with the purpose of bringing together Catholics with leading roles in all walks of life, on the model of the German Katholikentage. The first three, held in 1863, 1864 and 1867, had considerable cultural, social and political impact. They lay at the foundation of the future development of a Catholic Party in Belgian politics, as well as a nascent Social Catholicism. The first congress saw the establishment of the Guild of Saint Thomas and Saint Luke, which shaped Belgian Gothic Revival architecture and art education. The main organiser of the first three congresses was Édouard Ducpétiaux, who died in 1868. They were hosted in Mechelen by the archbishop, Engelbert Sterckx, who died in December 1867, although much of the practical management fell to Isidore-Joseph du Rousseaux, a teacher at the junior seminary where many of the sessions were held.

Further congresses were held in 1891, 1909, and 1936.

== First Congress (1863) ==
The first Catholic Congress in Mechelen was held from 18 to 22 August 1863. The main speakers invited were Cardinal Wiseman, who spoke on the condition of Catholics in England, and Charles de Montalembert, who spoke on the principle of religious liberty.

== Second Congress (1864) ==
The second congress was held from 29 August to 3 September 1864. For the occasion, an exhibition of ecclesiastical art was organised in Mechelen through to the end of September.

== Third Congress (1867) ==
The third congress was held from 2 to 7 September 1867. It led directly to the 1868 founding of a Federation of Belgian Catholic Workers' Associations (a precursor of the Confederation of Christian Trade Unions).

== Fourth Congress (1891) ==
The 1891 congress, held 8-12 September, followed the publication of Pope Leo XIII's encyclical on social issues, Rerum Novarum, discussion of which dominated proceedings. There was a strong attempt from the political right to relativise or minimise the encyclical's impact and "correct" the leftwards tendency of the Social Congresses that had been held in Liège in 1886, 1887 and 1890. Proceedings were published in 1892 under the title Assemblée générale des Catholiques de Belgique: session de 1891. At the congress, Désiré-Joseph Mercier (the future cardinal) presented the work of the Higher Institute of Philosophy, founded in 1889.

== Fifth Congress (1909) ==
Concerned about the development of Christian Democracy and the generation of policy ideas outside political circles, the Catholic Party then in power insisted that the fifth congress be strictly apolitical. It brought together Catholic trade unionists, catechists, sodalities, confraternities, women's organisations, educators, and representatives of agricultural co-operatives, who reported to one another on their membership and activities under the broad concept of Catholic Action and dedicated to Christ the King. The fifth congress was later regarded as having been less dominated by political and intellectual elites than previous congresses had been.

== Sixth Congress (1936) ==
The papers delivered to the sixth congress, held in 1936, were published in French and in Dutch as an eight-volume series entitled Actes du VIe Congrès catholique de Malines and Verhandelingen van het VIe Katholiek Kongres van Mechelen respectively.

On 10 September, Georges Lemaître delivered an address on Catholic culture and exact science.

Developments in higher education for women were discussed by Marie Haps.
