= Hellscape =

Landscape like hell

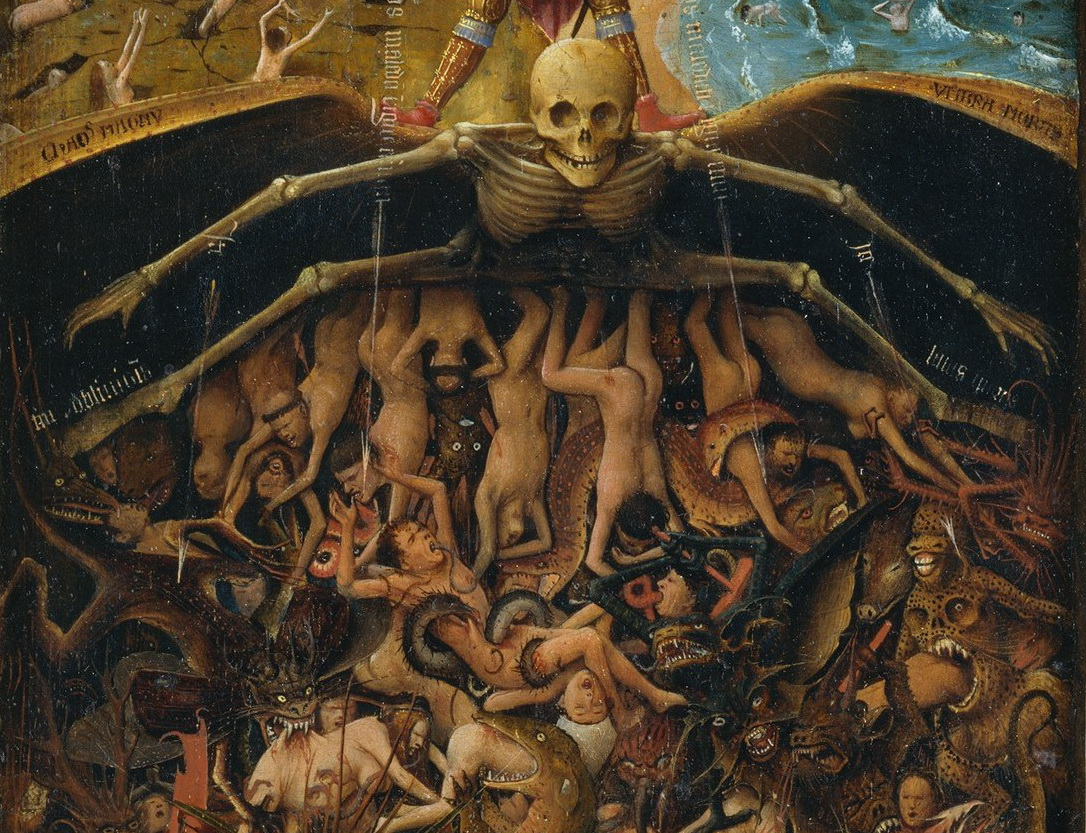
Part of Jan van Eyck's Crucifixion and Last Judgement diptych

A hellscape is a harsh environment, an unpleasant place, or a scene thought to resemble hell. A depiction of hell in a work of art is called a hellscape.

The earliest known use of the term in print was in 1894.

== In real life ==
Writers have sometimes described wartime environments as hellscapes, and after the atomic bombings of Hiroshima and Nagasaki, the cities were defined as such by its survivors. Writers have also used hellscape to describe the scene of a natural disaster such as a drought, plague, flood, or wildfire. Projections of the consequences of global warming have been described by journalists as hellscapes.

The usage of recreational drugs such as heroin has been described by its users as creating hellscapes.

In the tech press, journalists have defined Internet disinformation as a hellscape. Some have speculated the replacing of human labor with intelligent robots, or the use of child sex dolls, could lead to a future hellscape.

Vox wrote that postmodern philosophers have predicted a post-truth hellscape.

In October 2022, after purchasing Twitter, Elon Musk stated that it couldn't become "a free-for-all hellscape".

== In war ==
The United States Department of Defense has a significant drone program called “Replicator” to counter China’s military mass and capabilities. This program aims to create many thousands of low-cost, highly autonomous drones for deployment by the United States Indo-Pacific Command in the Indo-Pacific theater by 2025. “Hellscape” refers not to the program itself but to the complex and intensely contested battlespace environment that these drones are intended to navigate and dominate. The strategic intent is to enable U.S. forces to quickly identify and engage up to 1,000 targets within 24 hours using a network of land, air, and sea drones. These drones are designed to enhance the U.S.‘s operational flexibility and deter potential Chinese military actions, particularly regarding Taiwan’s security against a Chinese invasion force.

== In films ==
In films, depictions of hellscapes are common.

Apocalypse Now depicts earthly hellscapes, during war. Other notable examples in cinema include Blade Runner 2049, Alien, Mad Max: Fury Road, as well as all of the Mad Max series.

== In art ==
Hieronymus Bosch's The Last Judgement depicts a religious hellscape. Other examples are Jan van Eyck's Crucifixion and Last Judgement diptych, and Pieter Bruegel the Elder's Dull Gret.

== In literature ==
Dante's Inferno is one of the best-known examples of a hellscape. The Great Gatsby depicts the "Valley of the Ashes" as a hellscape.

== In video games ==
A number of video games depict hellscapes, including Hellblade: Senua's Sacrifice.
