= Charles-Joseph Voisin =

Belgian Catholic priest and art historian (1802–1872)

Charles-Joseph Voisin (1802–1872) was a Belgian Catholic clergyman and art historian.

== Life ==
Voisin was born in Frasnes-lez-Buissenal on 5 December 1802. He studied at the college of Tournai and the college of Soignies. He was ordained priest in 1825 and served in a number of different parishes until 1837, when he was appointed episcopal archivist. In 1844 he became Vicar General of the diocese of Tournai. He played an important role in the restoration of Tournai Cathedral in the 1840s, and subsequently in the restoration of other medieval churches in the diocese.

At the foundation of the Guild of St Thomas and St Luke, he was elected first president.

He died on 5 June 1872 and was buried in a crypt in Willemeau (now a subdivision of Tournai) that was unearthed in 2015 during public works next to the church.
