= Dagmar Eichberger =

German art historian (born 1955)

- Born: 1955 (age 70–71)
- Occupations: Art historian, curator, adjunct professor

Academic background
- Education: University of Heidelberg

Academic work
- Notable works: Renaissance culture in the Netherlands and Germany

Dagmar Eichberger (born 1955) is a German art historian, academic, educator, and curator specializing in Renaissance visual culture, courtly patronage, and the history of art collecting in early modern Europe.

== Education and teaching ==
Eichberger completed her MA and PhD in art history, history, and archaeology at the University of Heidelberg, where she later an adjunct professor („apl. Professorin“).

She has held teaching and research positions at the University of Canberra, Melbourne, Giessen, Jena, Konstanz, Paris, Trier and Vienna.

== Scholarly work ==
=== Margaret of Austria and collecting ===
Much of Eichberger’s scholarship concerns the court and collections of Margaret of Austria, Duchess of Savoy, regent of the Habsburg Netherlands. Her monograph Leben mit Kunst – Wirken durch Kunst examines Margaret’s collection at the Hof van Savoye in Mechelen through household inventories, architectural evidence, and surviving works of art.

Her studies address the arrangement and use of portraits, manuscripts, devotional images, precious objects, and curiosities within Margaret’s residence. They relate these collections to dynastic representation, religious practice, court ceremony, and political networks linking the Burgundian, Habsburg, Spanish, and Tudor courts.

Eichberger has also compared Margaret’s portrait galleries in Mechelen with those assembled by Mary of Hungary in Brussels. Reviews of Leben mit Kunst – Wirken durch Kunst have discussed its treatment of female collecting and court culture in the early sixteenth-century Netherlands.

=== Women and dynastic culture ===
Eichberger’s research also addresses the role of women in Burgundian and Habsburg court culture. Her publications cover patronage, portraiture, libraries, religious practice, ceremonial display, and gift exchange, with studies of Margaret of York, Margaret of Austria, Mary of Hungary, and Joanna of Castile.

=== Northern European art and artists ===
Eichberger has published on Netherlandish and German art from the fifteenth through the seventeenth centuries, including work on Jan van Eyck, Albrecht Dürer, devotional imagery, portraiture, guild patronage, and artists’ relations with courts and cities.

Her early publications examined narrative and meaning in works attributed to Jan van Eyck, including the New York diptych. She later edited Dürer and His Culture and contributed research on Dürer’s contacts with Margaret of Austria and the imperial court.

She has also contributed to scholarship on the social position of artists and the movement of artistic production between courtly and urban settings.

=== Curatorial work ===
Eichberger has curated and contributed to major international exhibitions on female patronage and dynastic culture. Her research informed the exhibition Women. The Art of Power. Three Women from the House of Habsburg at Schloss Ambras in Innsbruck, which examined the collecting practices and cultural influence of Habsburg women.

She has also participated in exhibition projects such as Women of Distinction: Margaret of York and Margaret of Austria.

== Boards and editorships ==
Eichberger was a founding member and board member of the Arbeitskreis Niederländische Kunst- und Kulturgeschichte from 2007 to 2011, served on the board of Historians of Netherlandish Art from 2008 to 2011, joined the advisory board of the Nederlands Kunsthistorisch Jaarboek in 2010, and became an associate editor of the Journal of Historians of Netherlandish Art in 2012.

== Major publications ==
- with Hans Belting, Jan van Eyck als Erzähler. Worms: Werner’sche Verlagsgesellschaft, 1983.
- Bildkonzeption und Weltdeutung im New Yorker Diptychon des Jan van Eyck. Wiesbaden: Ludwig Reichert, 1987.
- ed., Dürer and His Culture. Cambridge: Cambridge University Press, 1998.
- with Lisa Beaven, "Family Members and Political Allies: The Portrait Collection of Margaret of Austria". The Art Bulletin 77, no. 2 (1995): 225–248.
- "Margaret of Austria's Portrait Collection: Female Patronage in the Light of Dynastic Ambitions and Artistic Quality". Renaissance Studies 10, no. 2 (1996): 259–279.
- Leben mit Kunst – Wirken durch Kunst: Sammelwesen und Hofkunst unter Margarete von Österreich, Regentin der Niederlande. Turnhout: Brepols, 2002.
- Review of Marina Belozerskaya, Rethinking the Renaissance: Burgundian Arts across Europe. The Burlington Magazine 145, no. 1203 (2003): 453–454.
- "'Una libraria per donne assai ornata et riccha': Frauenbibliotheken des 16. Jahrhunderts zwischen Ideal und Wirklichkeit". In Gabriela Signori, ed., Die lesende Frau, Wolfenbütteler Forschungen 121, 241–264. Wiesbaden: Harrassowitz, 2009.
- with Anne-Marie Legaré and Wim Hüsken, Women at the Burgundian Court: Presence and Influence. Turnhout: Brepols, 2010.
- with Philippe Lorentz and Andreas Tacke, eds., The Artist between Court and City (1300–1600) = L'artiste entre la Cour et la Ville = Der Künstler zwischen Hof und Stadt. Petersberg: Michael Imhof Verlag, 2017.
- "The Seven Sorrows of the Virgin: Spreading a New Cult via Dynastic Networks". In Christine Göttler and Mia M. Mochizuki, eds., The Nomadic Object: The Challenge of World for Early Modern Religious Art, Intersections 53, 483–512. Leiden and Boston: Brill, 2018.
- with Sabine Haag and Annemarie Jordan Gschwend, eds., Women: The Art of Power: Three Women from the House of Habsburg. Vienna: Kunsthistorisches Museum, 2018.
- "Kunst und Geschäftssinn: Albrecht Dürers Begegnungen mit Margarete von Österreich und sein Netzwerk am kaiserlichen Hof". In Peter van den Brink, ed., Dürer war hier: Eine Reise wird Legende, 136–149. Petersberg: Michael Imhof Verlag, 2021.
- ed., A Spectacle for a Spanish Princess: The Festive Entry of Joanna of Castile into Brussels (1496). Burgundica 35. Turnhout: Brepols, 2023.
