= Becket Casket =

12th-century reliquary

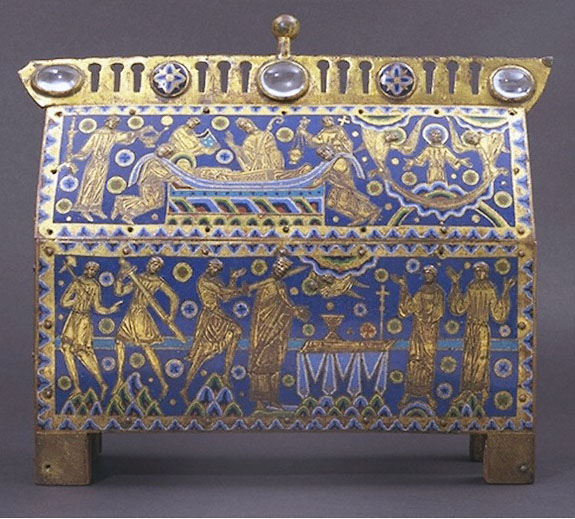
- Year: circa 1180s
- Dimensions: 29.5 cm × 34.4 cm (11.6 in × 13.5 in)
- Location: Victoria and Albert Museum
- Accession: M.66-1997

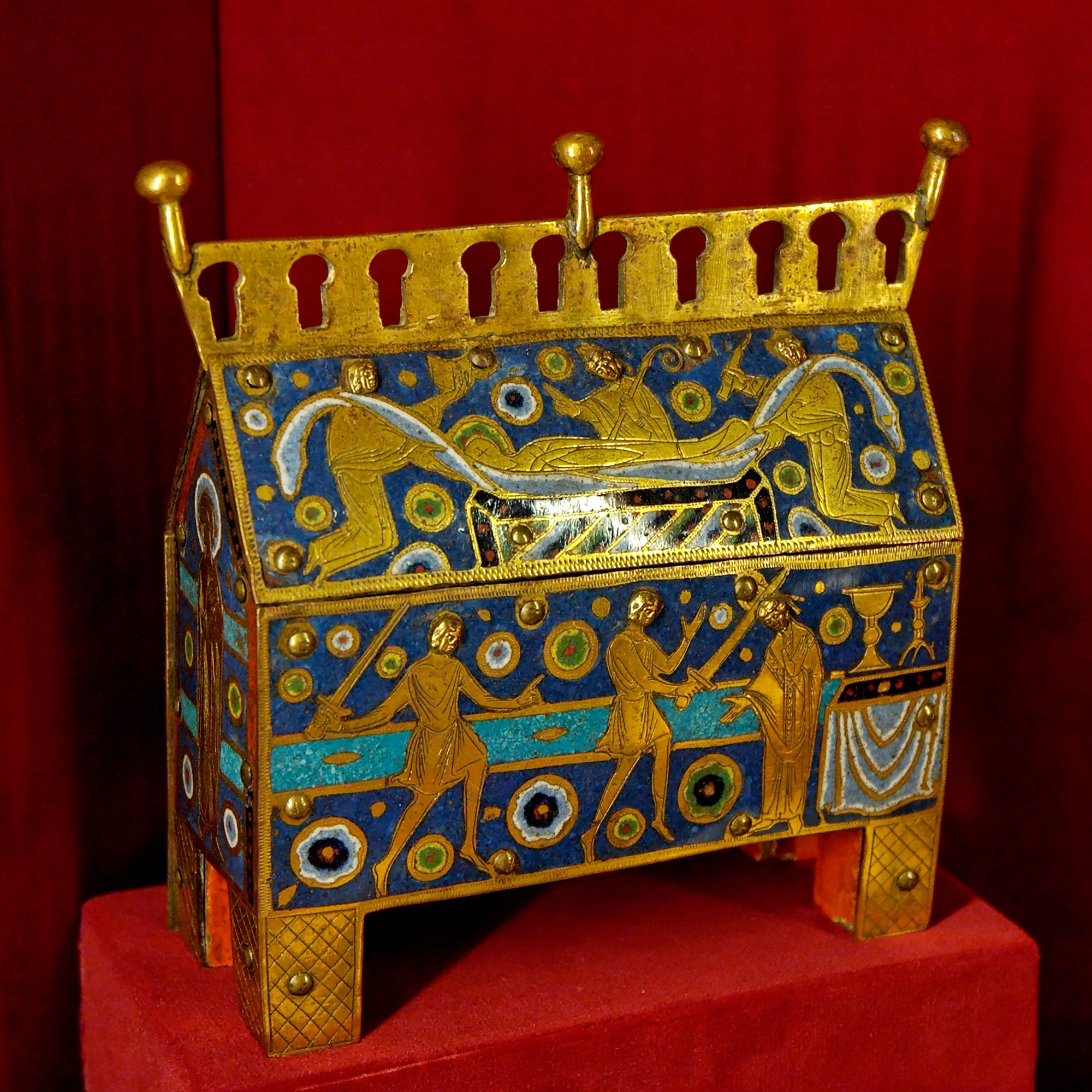
A simpler, slightly later chasse showing scenes of Beckett's life.

The Becket Casket is a reliquary made in about 1180–1190 in Limoges, France, and depicts one of the most infamous events in English history, the murder of Archbishop Thomas Becket. Following the assassination, relics of St Thomas were placed in similar reliquaries and dispersed across the world. This 'chasse' shaped reliquary is made of gilt-copper round a wooden core, intricately decorated with champlevé enamel to tell the story of Thomas Becket through literal and symbolic imagery. An exemplary showcasing of the Limoges enamel technique, this reliquary is now located in the Victoria and Albert Museum in London, England.

== History ==
=== Becket assassination ===
On the night of 29 December 1170, Archbishop Thomas Becket was assassinated in Canterbury Cathedral by four knights acting on the orders of King Henry II. This event sparked widespread indignation across Europe, leading to a surge of pilgrims visiting Canterbury to pay their respects at the scene of the murder. In 1173, Becket was canonised, and his shrine became one of the most renowned in Christianity. However, during Henry VIII's reign in 1538, the shrine was completely destroyed. It is thought that this particular casket was made to hold the relics of Thomas Becket that were taken to Peterborough Abbey (now Peterborough Cathedral) by Abbot Benedict in 1177. Benedict had been Prior at Canterbury Cathedral and therefore saw Becket's assassination. Although many stories from British medieval history are not as familiar, the Becket assassination still remains well-known to this day.

==== Aftermath ====
Many of Becket's relics were encased in similar elaborate caskets and dispersed all around the world, however, the chasse that is currently held by the Victoria and Albert Museum is believed to have the earliest date. It is also said to be the most ornate and the largest of all of the other caskets.

Also referred to as the 'St. Neots Chasse', the chasse was found in Old Hall Place in St. Neots, Cambridgeshire in 1765. The original building has since been demolished, and a plaque erected near the site. Until the dissolution of the monasteries, St. Neots had been the home of a Benedictine Priory. The Priory and St. Neots' relative proximity to Peterborough may explain how the chasse came to be found in the town.

Over 45 medieval chasses survive showing Becket's story and thought to have been made in Limoges. Another fine example is in the Burrell Collection in Glasgow. This is not the only depiction of the Becket assassination, as the Trinity Chapel in Canterbury displayed and familiarised the story and its imagery through its stained glass windows. Located near these windows and behind the throne of the Archbishop there was a shrine holding Becket's relics, ornately enclosed in precious metals and stones. The shrine was created and placed in its location in 1220, but destroyed later.

== Imagery ==
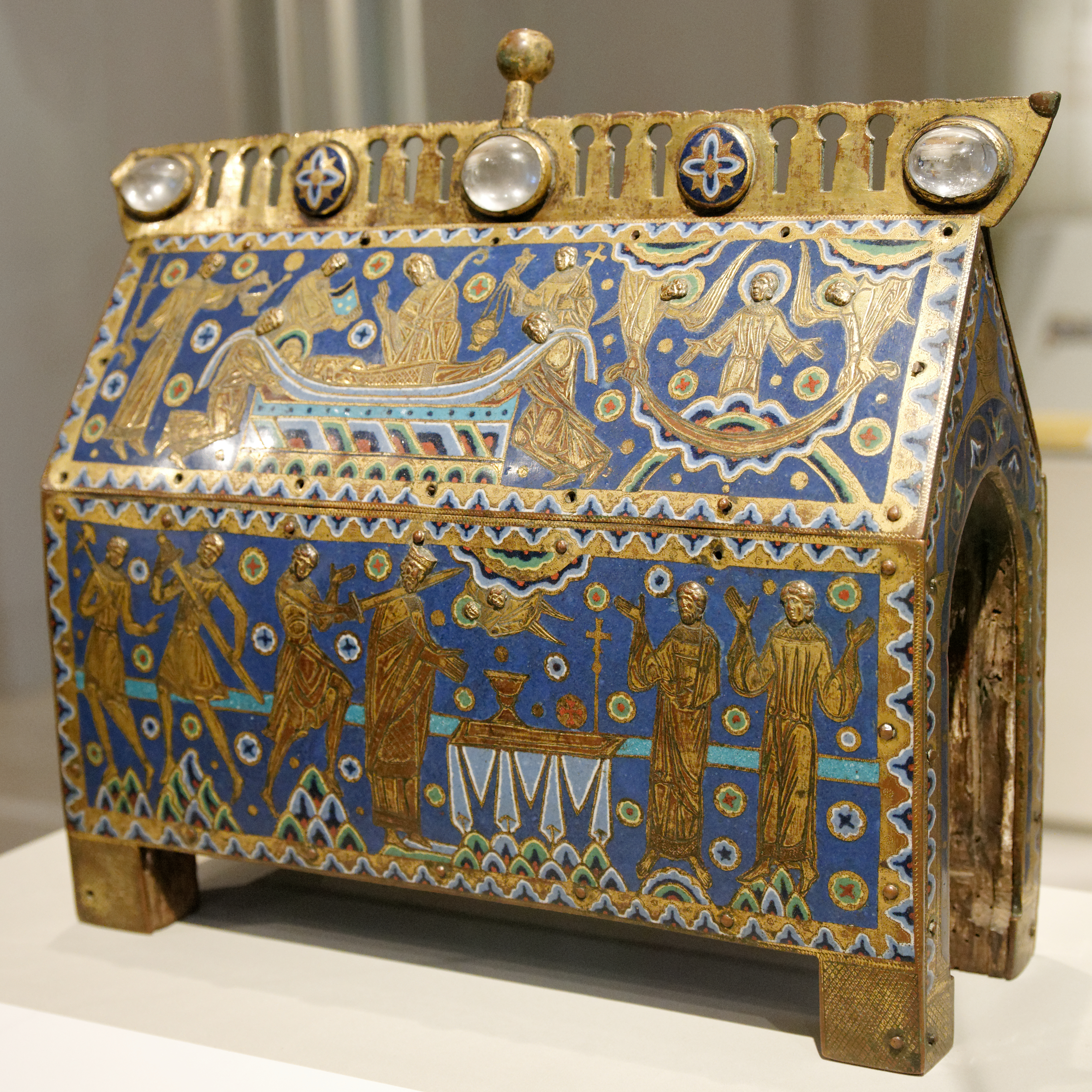
Reliquary casket with scenes from the life of St Thomas Becket, Limoges enamel.

The vessel itself is exemplary of the Romanesque style, with Byzantine and Roman influences throughout. The story of Becket's assassination is displayed across the different sides of the casket, though the significance of certain figures on the back are only presumed, and one end of the vessel is missing its door panel. The imagery across the vessel tells the story of Becket's murder and the subsequent ascension to heaven following his death.

The act of the assassination is depicted on the front panel of the casket. Archbishop Thomas Becket is seen upright, reaching for a chalice that is sitting atop an alter before him. To the right of him is the four knights who committed the act, wielding different weapons and poses. The first knight is pictured decapitating St. Thomas with a long sword, while two horrified priests witness the act from the opposite side of the altar. In this depiction of the story, the scene is presented in more detail and with more figures present, whereas in a similar reliquary of British origin, the scene simply displays Becket alone with the knights.

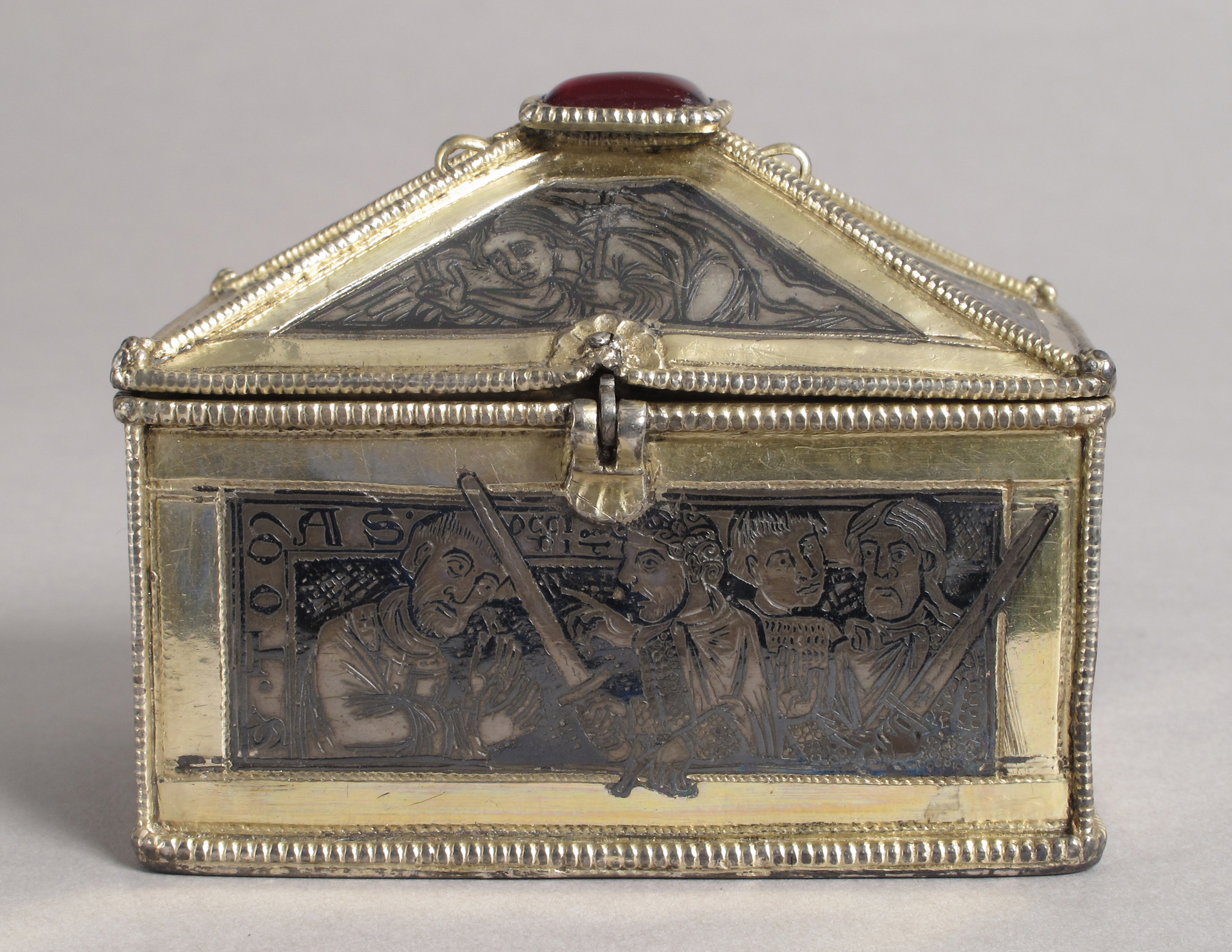
Reliquary Casket with Scenes from the Martyrdom of Saint Thomas Becket, British (MET, 17.190.520)

The dead body of Becket is displayed on the front facing rectangular roof panel. His body is supported by a priest on each end, while funerary rites are performed by a Bishop and three more priests standing around the deceased. On the immediate left of these figures, a separate scene depicts the ascension of St. Thomas's soul into heaven. His soul is escorted into heaven by two angels that carry the shroud on which he laid. This particular scene is depicted similarly to the metalwork reliquary from the MET, as Becket's body is carried by two priests at each end.

An image of Christ in Majesty is shown on the left side gable. The figure is depicted atop a rainbow and surrounded by trefoils and stars. A turret and an ornate arch are seen on the opposite gable on the right hand side, where it is believed that a figure of St. Peter was probably displayed on the missing door panel.

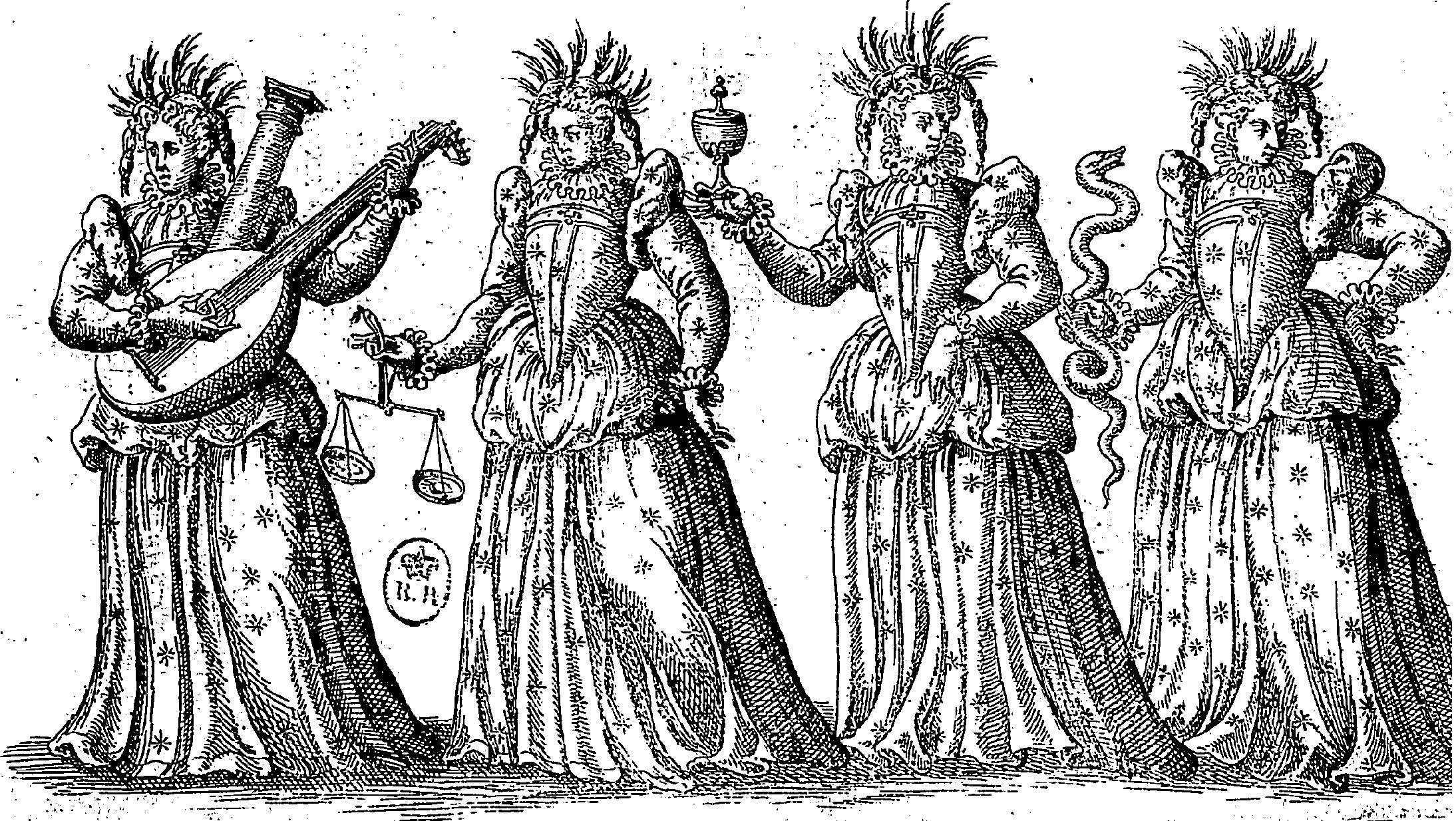
An image personifying the four virtues (Ballet Comique de la Reine, 1582)

There are four figures on the rear roof and bottom panels, each donning a halo and long hair. These figures can be interpreted as a personified version of the Cardinal Virtues, possibly due to other symbolic personifications of such, or simply as saints.

The rear bottom and roof panels are heavily patterned with quatrefoils of large and small sizes, with the previously mentioned saint figures at each of the four corners. As with the door panel on the right hand gable, the vessel is also missing the floor panel. All of the figures depicted throughout the vessel feature gilt-copper heads.

== Technique ==
=== Champlevé enamel ===
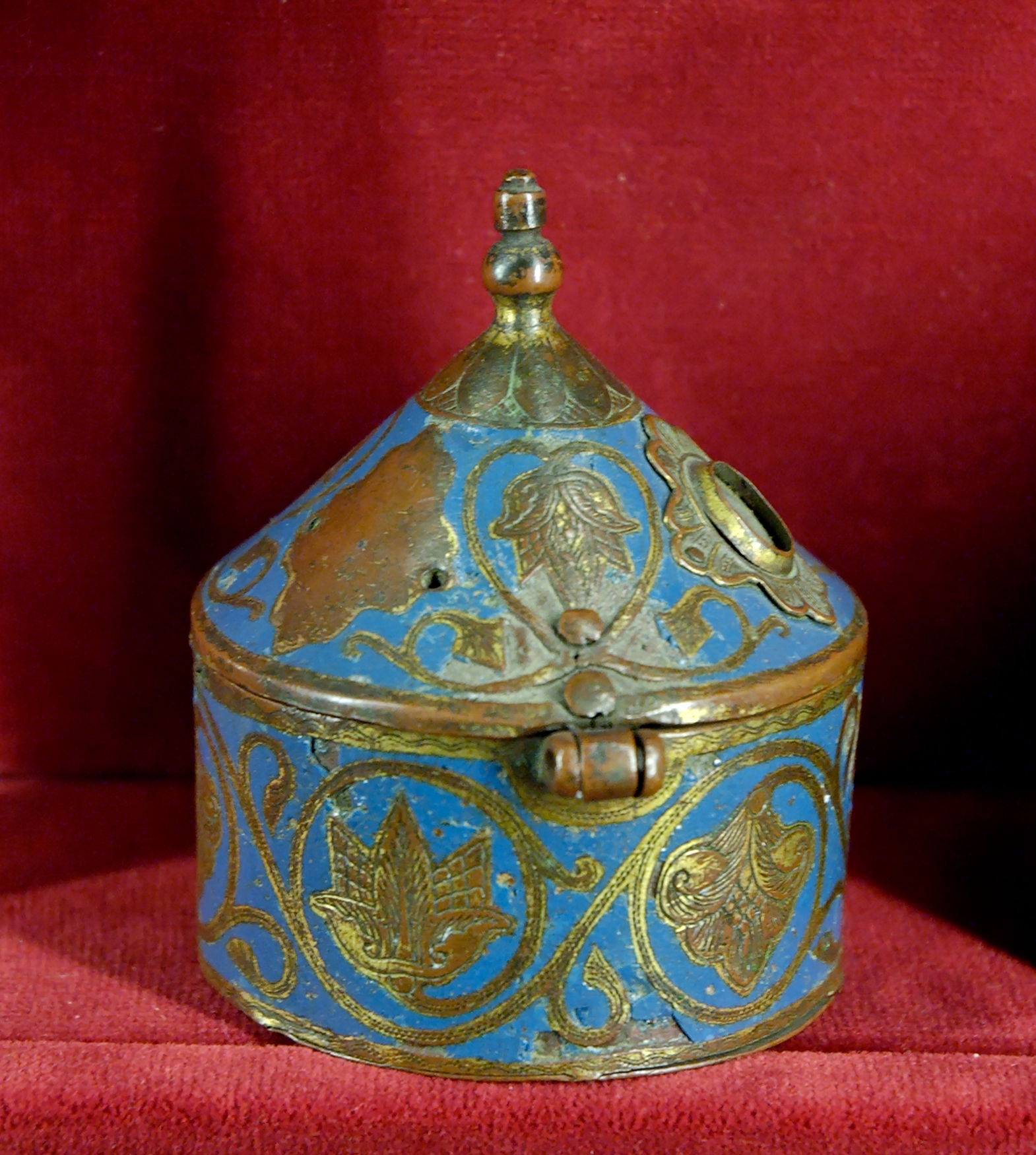
Pyx with palmettes decoration. Champlevé copper, enameled and gilt. Limoges, 13th century.

The Becket Casket is ornately decorated with champlevé enamel surrounding its wooden core and gilded copper interior. The decorative technique of champlevé enamel is a method in which high heat is utilized to fuse a powdered glass material into a recessed area of a metal surface.

The basic process of enameling involves fusing powdered material, such as glass, to the outer surface of a metallic or similar object through the use of high temperature. It is an ancient artistic process, used throughout history and crossing borders to create beautifully decorated pieces of all kinds. The process of champlevé enameling holds almost all of the basic steps as that of regular enameling. However in this technique, recesses of all shapes and sizes are carefully carved into the metallic body of the object and further filled with the powdered glass or frit, allowing for a different finish. The recessing in the body of the object can also be cast or etched, and the following steps remain the same.

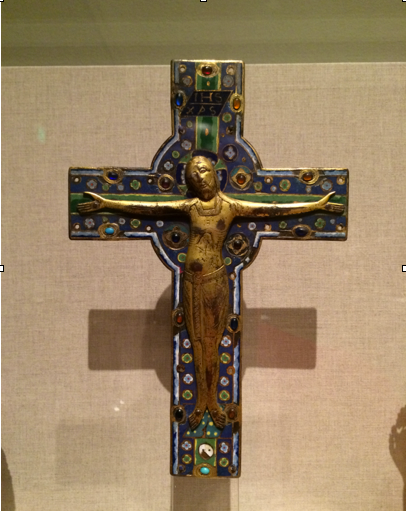
A champlevé enamel piece from Limoges, France

The technique of champlevé enameling is prominently known as having flourished in the French city of Limoges. The Becket Casket showcases the skills of Limoges enamellers, who crafted lavish items using cost-effective yet long-lasting materials.

==== Limoges & other works ====
Several of St. Thomas' relics were housed in caskets crafted with Limoges enamel, originating from southwest France, likely due to this region being renowned for producing items with champlevé enamel. This specific technique is known for its vibrant blues, intricate rosettes, and carefully engraved figures. The Limoges enamels are a body of intricate metalwork of the medieval times, most prominent throughout the Middle Ages in Europe. These pieces, much like the Becket Casket, served clerical purposes and were commissioned by wealthy and royal patrons. Not only did the pieces of Limoges created using champlevé enamel hold an aesthetic appeal, but they also had a strong functionality, as their copper interiors were durable and thick. These pieces did not suffer the same unraveling as silver or gold at the time, as the copper would not easily be misshapen through everyday handling.
