= Reliquary Shrine of Saint Eleutherius =

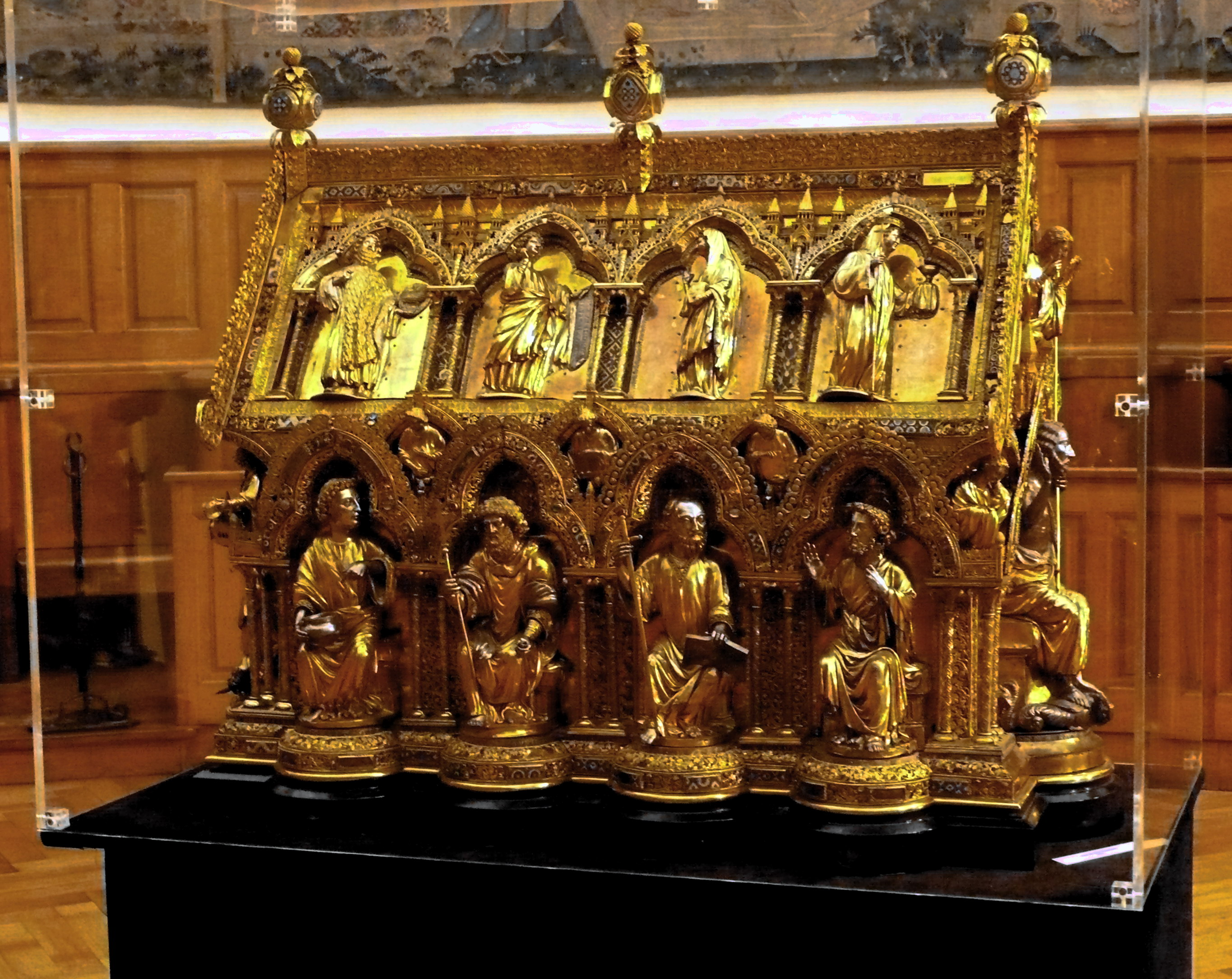
The Reliquary Shrine of Saint Eleutherius, 1247, in the Cathedral of Tournai

The great gilt-copper and enamel Reliquary Shrine of Saint Eleutherius in the cathedral of Tournai (Belgium), one of the masterpieces of Gothic metalwork, was commissioned by Bishop Walter de Marvis of Tournai, and completed in 1247, on the occasion of the retranslation of relics of Saint Eleutherius of Tournai, traditionally the city's first bishop. The shrine takes the architectural form of a chasse or gabled casket; its more distant prototype is the gabled sarcophagus that was an established Romanesque convention in Northern Europe, "a form which was quite fitting," Marvin Ross observed in discussing the similarly shaped gilt-copper and enamel reliquary of Saint Amand in the Walters Museum "since these châsses were in a sense also tombs". As with the prototypical tombs, a blind arcade runs along the base, forming niches with the protective seated figures of Apostles and Prophets. In its gable end St Eleutherius appears, holding his crozier in one hand and in the other a model of the cathedral with its five spires.

The shrine was made in Tournai or its immediate vicinity, once part of a prolific production that is now all but lost; it has been attributed to the workshop that was founded by Nicholas of Verdun, the leading goldsmith of Mosan art, who completed the reliquary of Our Lady in 1205. It is conserved in the Treasury of the cathedral of Tournai, housed in the former chapterhouse.

Two years following the completion of this reliquary, a separate one was made for the head of Saint Eleutherius, now lost with its contents.

== Gallery ==
Details of the reliquary

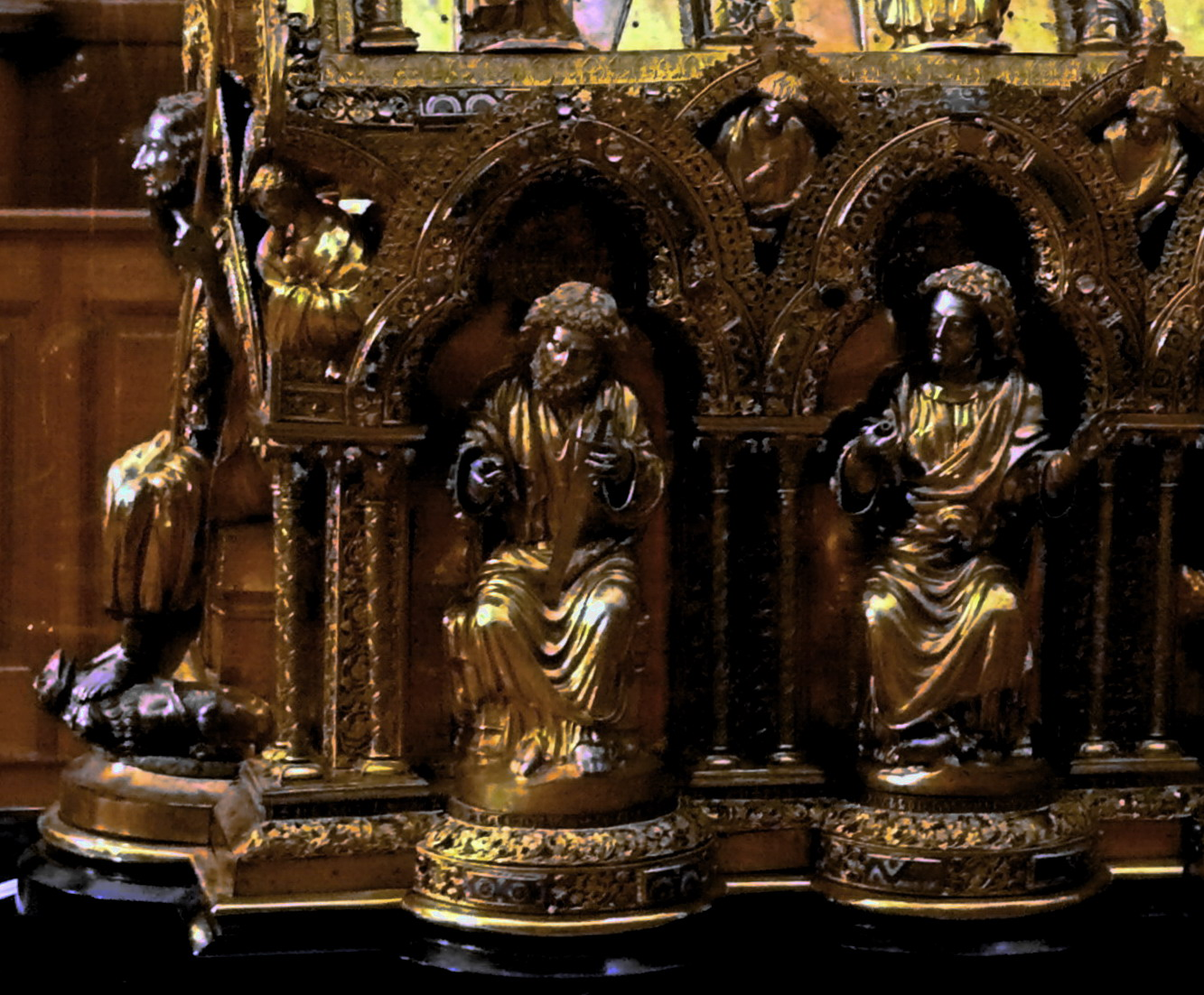
Face A - left.

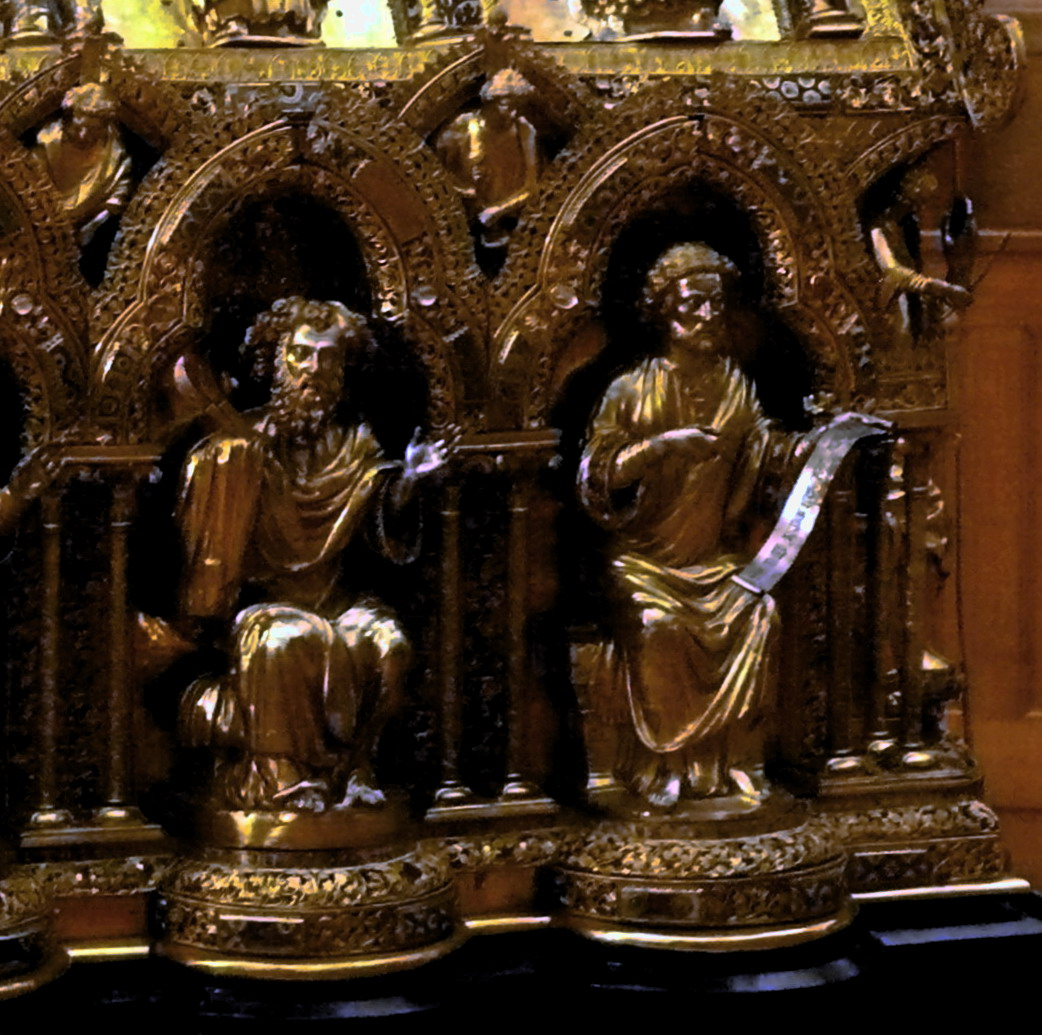
Face A - right.

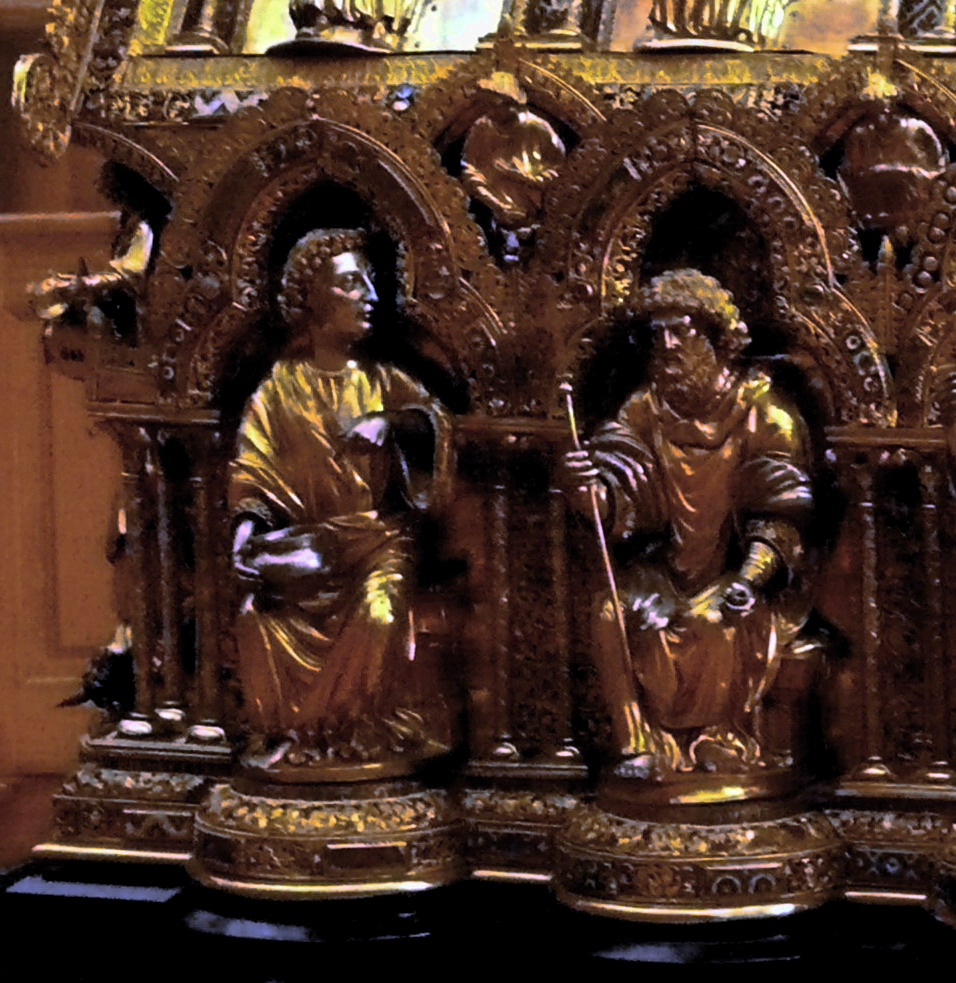
Face B - left.

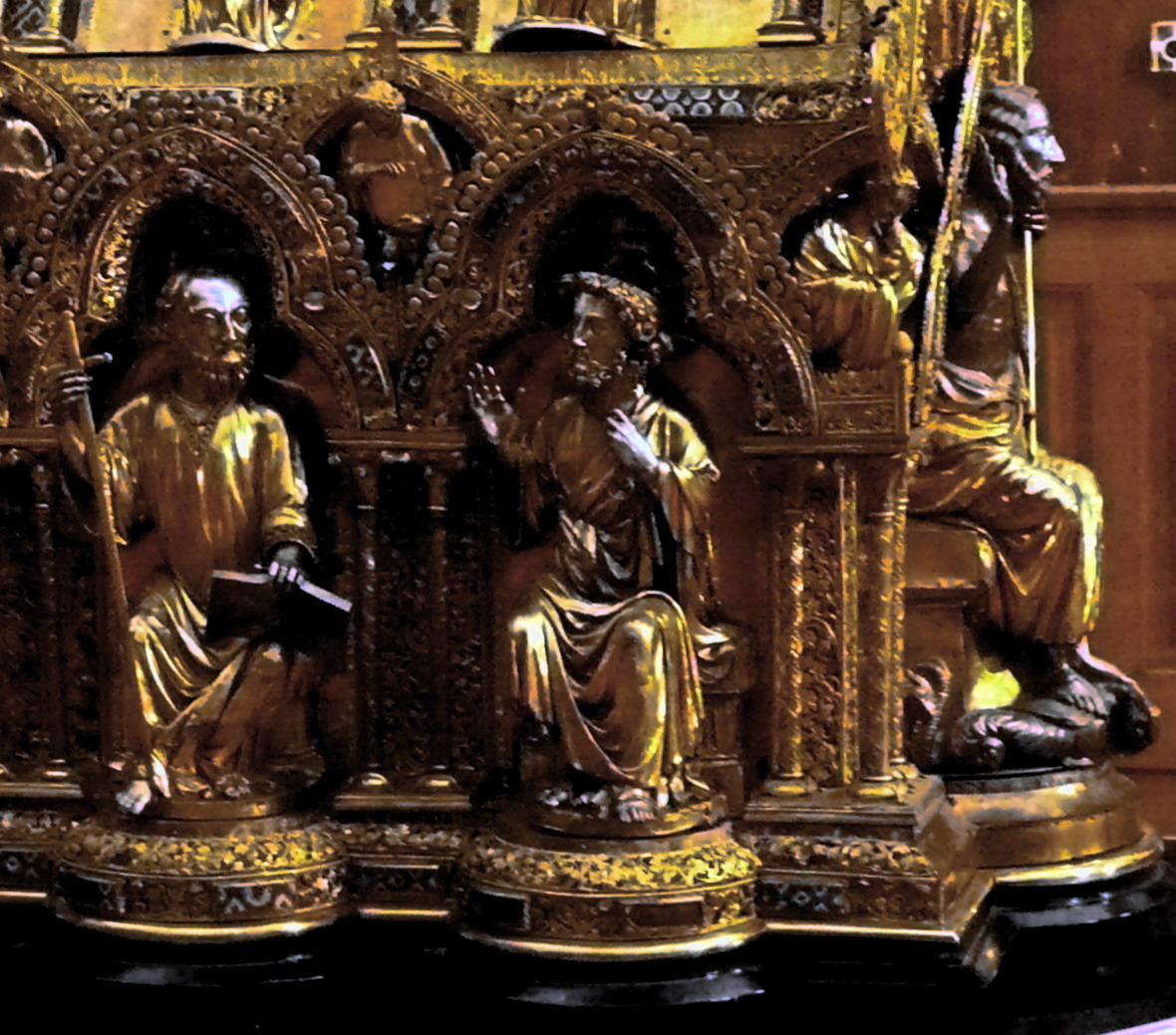
Face B - right.
