= Eleutherius of Tournai =

Bishop of Tournai and saint (d. ca. 532)

Saint Eleutherius of Tournai
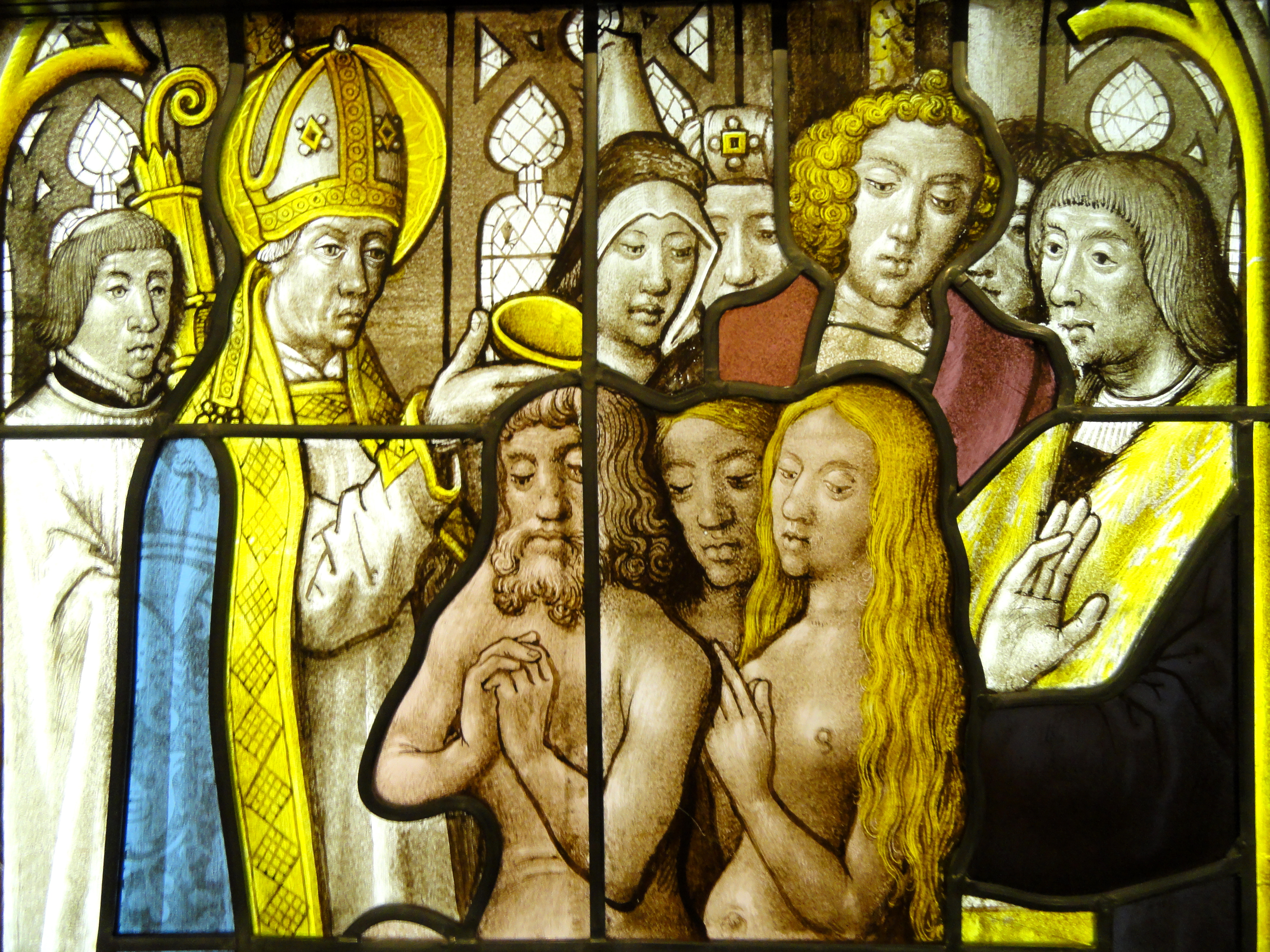
- St Eleutherius of Tournai Baptizing Converts (detail), workshop of Arnold of Nijmegen, Flemish, c. 1500-1525

Bishop
- Born: 451 - 481; Tournai
- Died: c. 532; Duchy of Lower Lorraine
- Venerated in: Roman Catholic Church; Eastern Orthodox Church
- Major shrine: Tournai Cathedral
- Feast: 20 February; 25 August (translation of relics)

Saint Eleutherius of Tournai (French: Eleuthère) (died c. 532) is venerated as a saint and considered the first bishop of Tournai. The Catholic Encyclopedia writes that "historically there is very little known about St. Eleutherius, but he was without doubt the first Bishop of Tournai."

Tradition makes him a lifelong friend of St. Medardus, and the two saints had been courtiers before becoming bishops.

Eleutherius was probably named bishop of Tournai after St. Remigius organized the church hierarchy of northern Gaul at the end of the fifth century.

Some sermons on the Trinity, Nativity, and the feast of the Annunciation (Bibliotheca Patrum, vol. XV) are falsely attributed to him.

== Martyrdom ==
Eleutherius is venerated as a martyr although this legend is considered an invention of the canon priest Henri of Tournai, who wrote a vita of Eleutherius in 1141. At the end of the 11th century the Church of Tournai had been trying to become independent from the diocese of Noyon, and Henri had been motivated by the need to prove the antiquity of the Church of Tournai. Catholic Online repeats the legend that a "group of Arians enraged by his preaching beat him severely He died some weeks later [sic]."

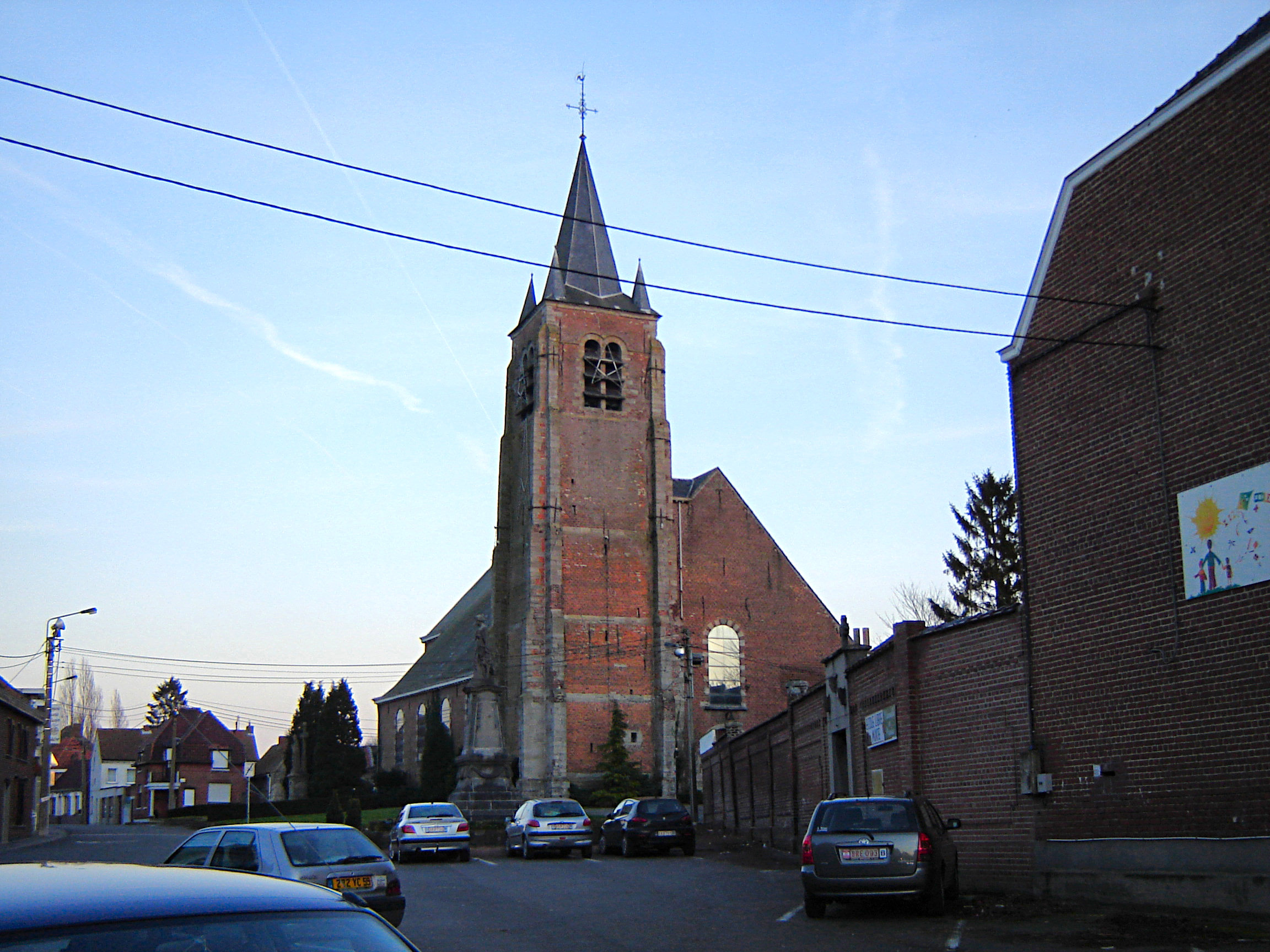
Church of Saint-Eleuthère at Blandain.

Henri's account states that Eleutherius was a native of Tournai who was born during the reign of Childeric I. Eleutherius' parents were Christians and were named Terenus and Blanda; Terenus was a descendant in the family of Irenaeus of Lyons. Persecutions of Christians forced the family to flee to a village named Blandinium (Blandain), but after the conversion of Clovis to Christianity, the family built a church at Blandinium (Blandain). Eleutherius eventually became bishop of Tournai, and was consulted by Pope Hormisdas on the matter of eradicating Arianism. Eleutherius convened a church council, and argued effectively against the Arians, who were angered by this. One day, as he was going to church, he was beaten up by a group of Arians and left for dead. He subsequently died from the wounds he received, on his death-bed confiding his flock to Medardus.

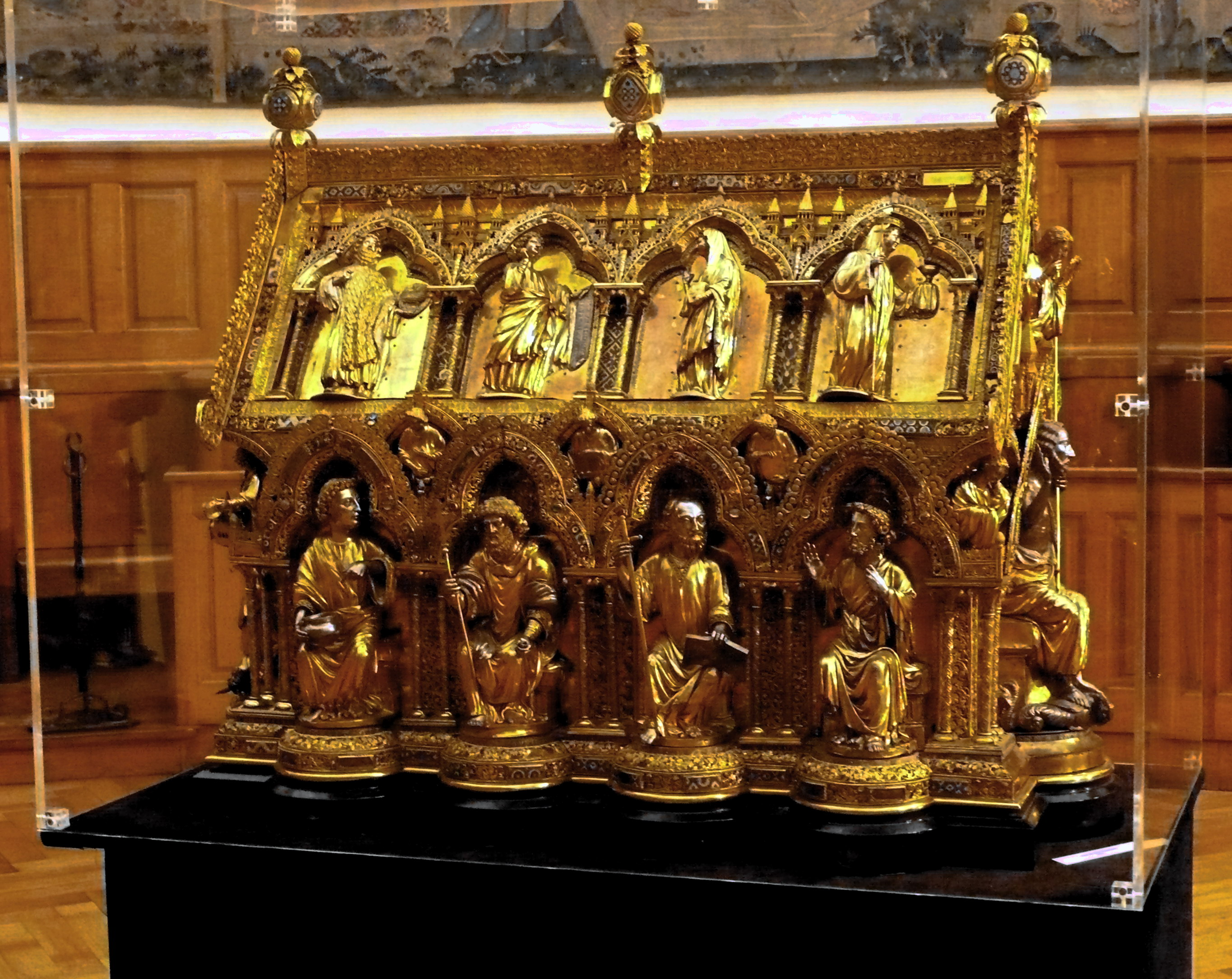
The Reliquary Shrine of Saint Eleutherius, 1247, in the Cathedral of Tournai

== Veneration ==
There exists a testimony recording the recovery of his relics during the episcopate of Bishop Hedilo of Tournai, in 897 or 898. Bishop Baudoin translated Eleutherius' relics in 1064 or 1065. Eleutherius' relics were translated again in 1247, when the great reliquary shrine was commissioned by Bishop Walter de Marvis. In its gable end St Eleutherius appears, holding his crozier in one hand and in the other a model of the cathedral with its five spires.

The monastery of St. Martin at Tournai and the cathedral of Bruges also claimed some of the saint's relics.
