= Chasse (casket) =

Shape commonly used in medieval metalwork for reliquaries

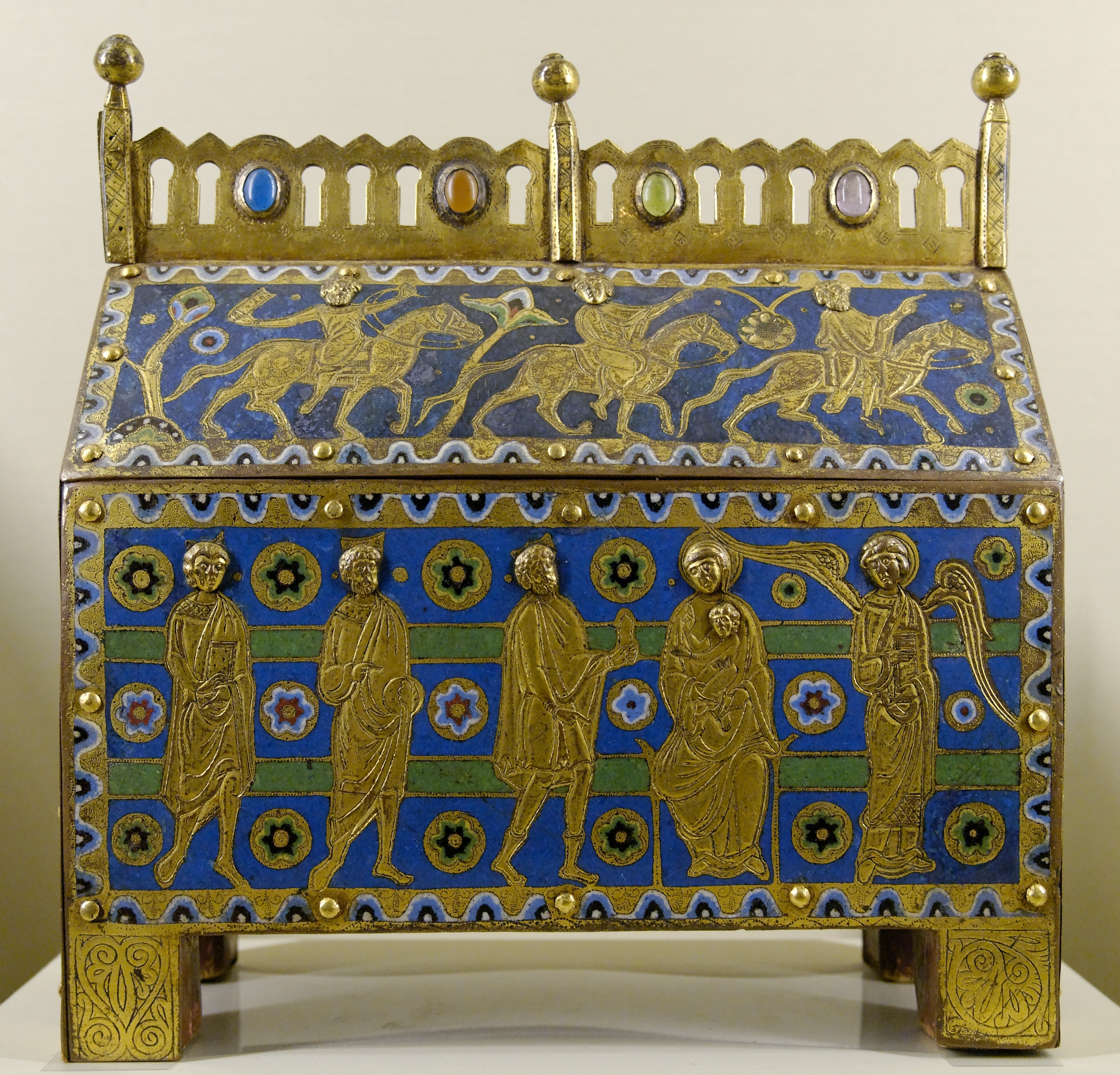
Limoges enamel chasse, c. 1200, with the story of the Three Magi.

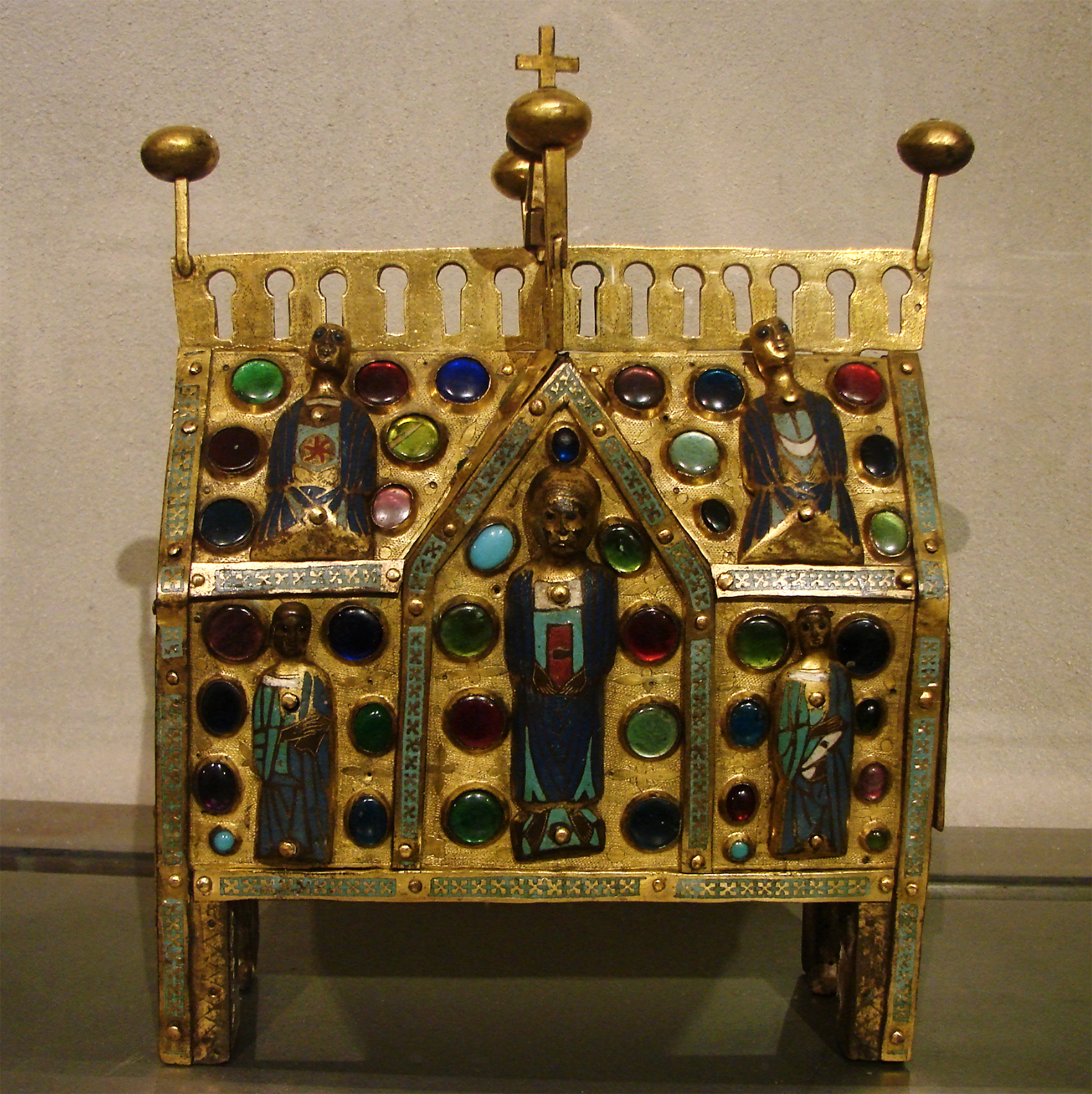
Limoges example of the first style with the figures enamelled, and gems.

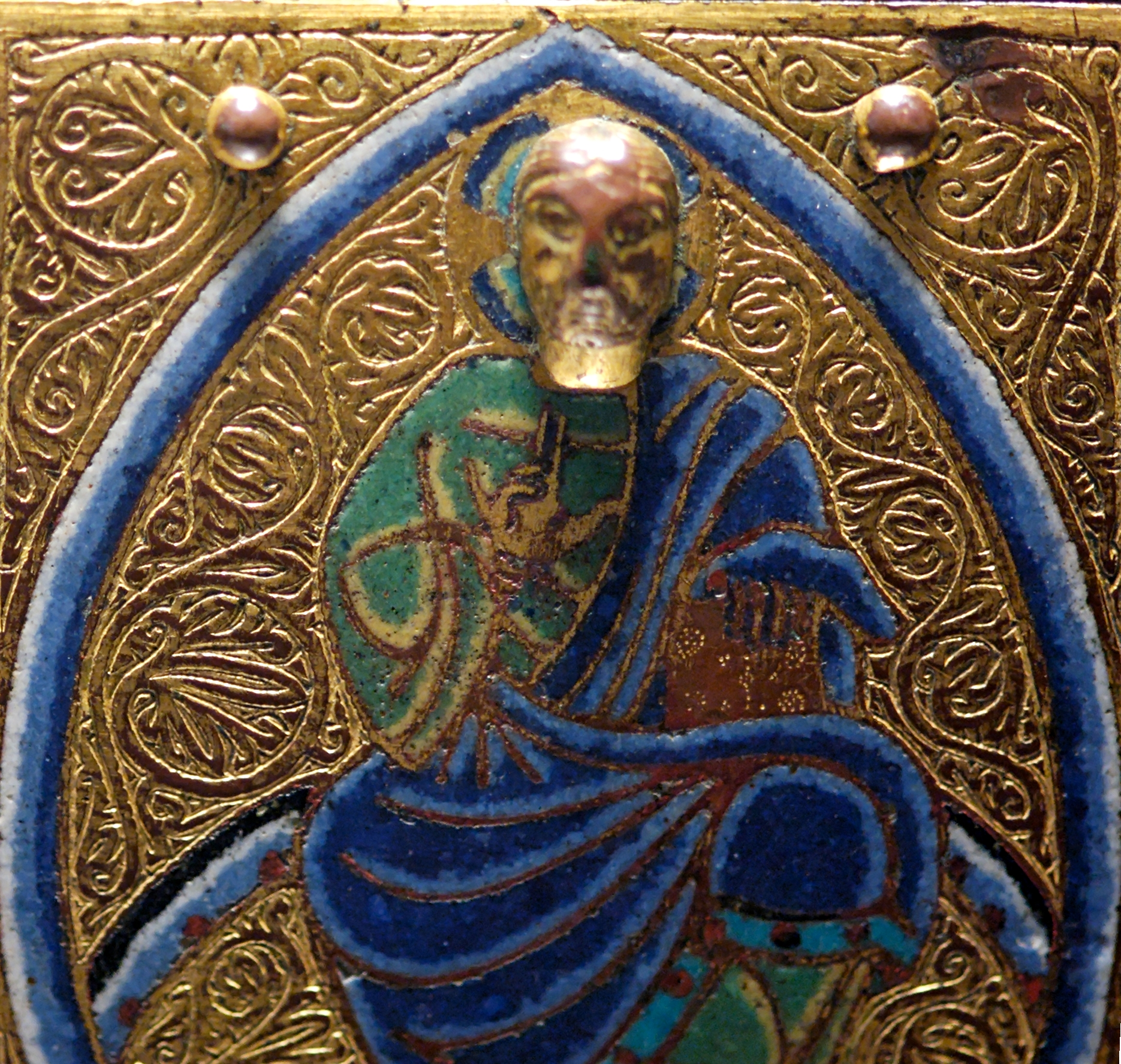
Detail showing a "vermiculated" background

A chasse, châsse or box reliquary is a shape commonly used in medieval metalwork for reliquaries and other containers. To the modern eye the form resembles a house, though a tomb or church was more the intention, with an oblong base, straight sides and two sloping top faces meeting at a central ridge, often marked by a raised strip and decoration. From the sides there are therefore triangular "gable" areas.

The casket usually stands on straight stumpy feet, and there is a hinged opening to allow access, either one of the panels, but not on the front face, or the wooden bottom; there is usually a lock. The shape possibly developed from a similar shape of sarcophagus that goes back to Etruscan art, or from Early Medieval Insular art, where there are a number of house-shaped shrines, reliquaries or cumdachs ("book-shrines"), with similar shapes. The Monymusk Reliquary is typical of these, having four sloping panels above, so no "gables". A 13th-century example of the fully-sloping type is the chasse of Saint Exupère in Limoges enamel (see gallery of images, below). The word derives, via the French châsse, from the Latin capsa, meaning "box".

== Use of the term ==
In English the word may or may not be italicised, and if it is may use the French circumflex: châsse. Regardless of the form used, the term in English is normally only used of "house"-shaped boxes, usually enamelled ones, whereas in French it is a general term for reliquaries with a box, "shrine" or casket form, of any shape, and tends to be used especially for larger examples.

The chasse shape was also used for most of the much larger, and far grander, reliquary shrines made by goldsmiths for cathedrals and great monasteries, like the Reliquary Shrine of Saint Eleutherius in the cathedral of Tournai, but these featured elaborate three-dimensional decoration, with gold or silver-gilt the predominant impression. These are less often described as chasses in English, though they are likely to be so termed in French, where the term châsse mostly refers to large sarcophagus-sized reliquaries. In larger chasses the shape may be more complex, as in the Shrine of the Three Kings in Cologne, which has "side-roofs" like an aisled church.

== Development ==
The development of the champlevé enamel technique made enamel decoration far easier and so cheaper than the previous fiddly cloisonné process, and enabled much larger surfaces to be covered in a single firing. The enamel chasse was developed to exploit these new possibilities. By the 12th century, the Romanesque chasse had become popular as a relatively cheap form for reliquaries, especially for the enamelled caskets made in Limoges and Spain, which were exported all over Europe.

Limoges was on one of the main pilgrim routes to Santiago de Compostela, which probably helped distribution. These were made round a wooden core, usually consisting of seven pieces of oak which were primed and painted, to which fairly thin sheets of copper decorated in champlevé enamel and gilding were nailed with pins with rounded gilt heads. The flat panels were fired before the box was assembled around the wooden core, using "assembling marks" on the wood and the rear of the metal plates. In the late 14th century a new all-metal method of construction was developed, with chasses "fitted together by an ingenious system of slots, lugs, and dovetails". There were sometimes gems, usually in fact made of glass, set on the faces, and especially into the roof-ridge, which often has finials and a row of keyhole shaped openings.

Though still luxury products, enamel chasses were cheap compared to a custom-made object from a goldsmith, and the effect impressive and colourful. The solidity of the boxes, and the difficulty of recovering the relatively low value of the gold used, has meant a high survival rate compared to other types of medieval metalwork, at least for religious chasses; over 700 medieval Limoges chasses survive, often in very good condition. In the earlier examples only the figures and decorative roundels were enamelled, but in the 13th century this was usually reversed, with an enamelled background, generally dominated by blue, and figures just engraved and gilded. A group from the end of the 12th century with some sixty survivals have enamelled figures and "vermiculated" gilded backgrounds "incised in a pattern of densely interwoven vine scrolls and tendrils". Often, as in the examples illustrated, the heads alone were modelled in relief, but sometimes whole figures, usually by hammering from behind into a mould. After several decades they were being produced by workshops in large numbers, using standard patterns, and could be afforded by relatively small parish churches.

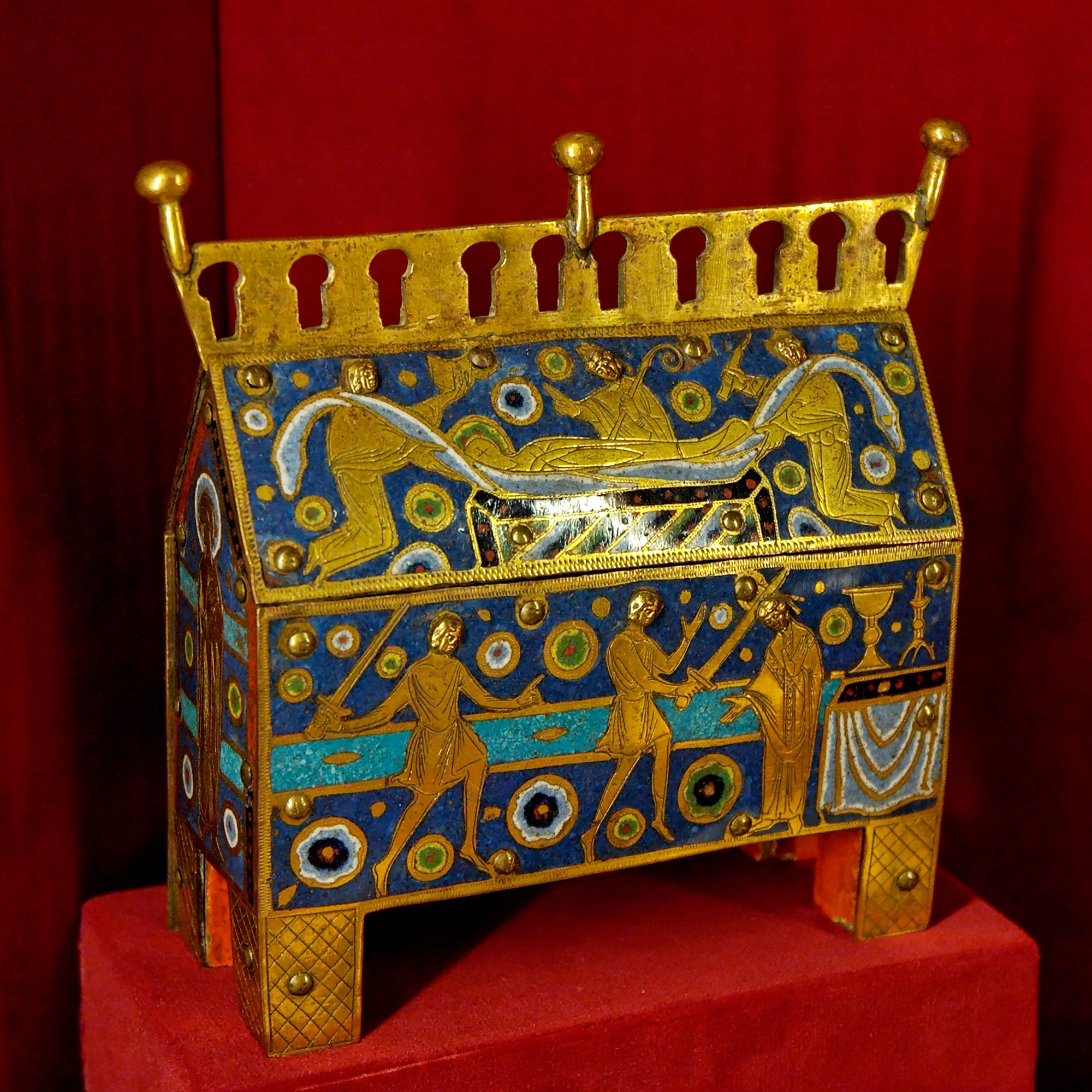
Chasse or reliquary with Thomas Becket's murder in Canterbury Cathedral shown below, and his burial in the cathedral above.

The shape was used for other purposes, and secular designs were made, although far fewer of these have survived. The enamel workshops modified their style slightly to reflect the coming of the Gothic, and were still producing chasses in the 14th century and beyond, although quality had by now fallen somewhat, and the best quality enamel work was now in the new basse-taille technique. Production was already in decline, but the industry never recovered from the sack of Limoges in 1370 by the English under Edward, the Black Prince. Limoges had been part of the Plantaganet "Angevin Empire" since 1150, but the city had annoyed the Black Prince by surrendering to the French earlier, and 3,000 of the citizens are said to have been killed in the sack.

== Subjects ==
Many enamel chasses had static subjects including angels, standing saints and Christ in Majesty, but narrative subjects were also popular, including the story of the Three Biblical Magi, usually in two scenes, the Journey of the Magi above and Adoration of the Magi on the main face, the latter featuring on some 26 Limoges chasses. Their three bodies had been "rediscovered" near Milan in 1158, and were translated to the magnificent Shrine of the Three Kings in Cologne Cathedral in 1164; It has been suggested that fragments of the old stone Milan shrine were treated as relics, explaining the demand for Magi reliquaries.

The murder of Thomas Becket, Archbishop of Canterbury, in 1170, was rapidly followed by his canonisation in 1173, and became a very common subject on chasses, with 52 surviving, usually showing his burial above and murder below, as in the Becket Casket in the V&A Museum in London. Becket's body was carefully preserved, but pieces of his clothes and other possessions were treated as relics, and were deliberately widely distributed by Canterbury to promote his cult from the 1170s until about 1220.

The otherwise obscure Saint Valerie came from Limoges, and has 22 surviving chasses showing her life, reflecting her popularity in the region; the lives of Saint Stephen, dedicatee of Limoges Cathedral and Saint Martial, its first bishop, are also represented on chasses. Figures of saints on chasses often lack identifying attributes, enabling purchasers to identify them with whatever saints they chose, or needed to match their relics. The most elaborate designs usually only appear on the front and sides; the rear faces, usually not visible, are typically more simply decorated with geometric patterns or beasts in roundels rather than figure compositions.

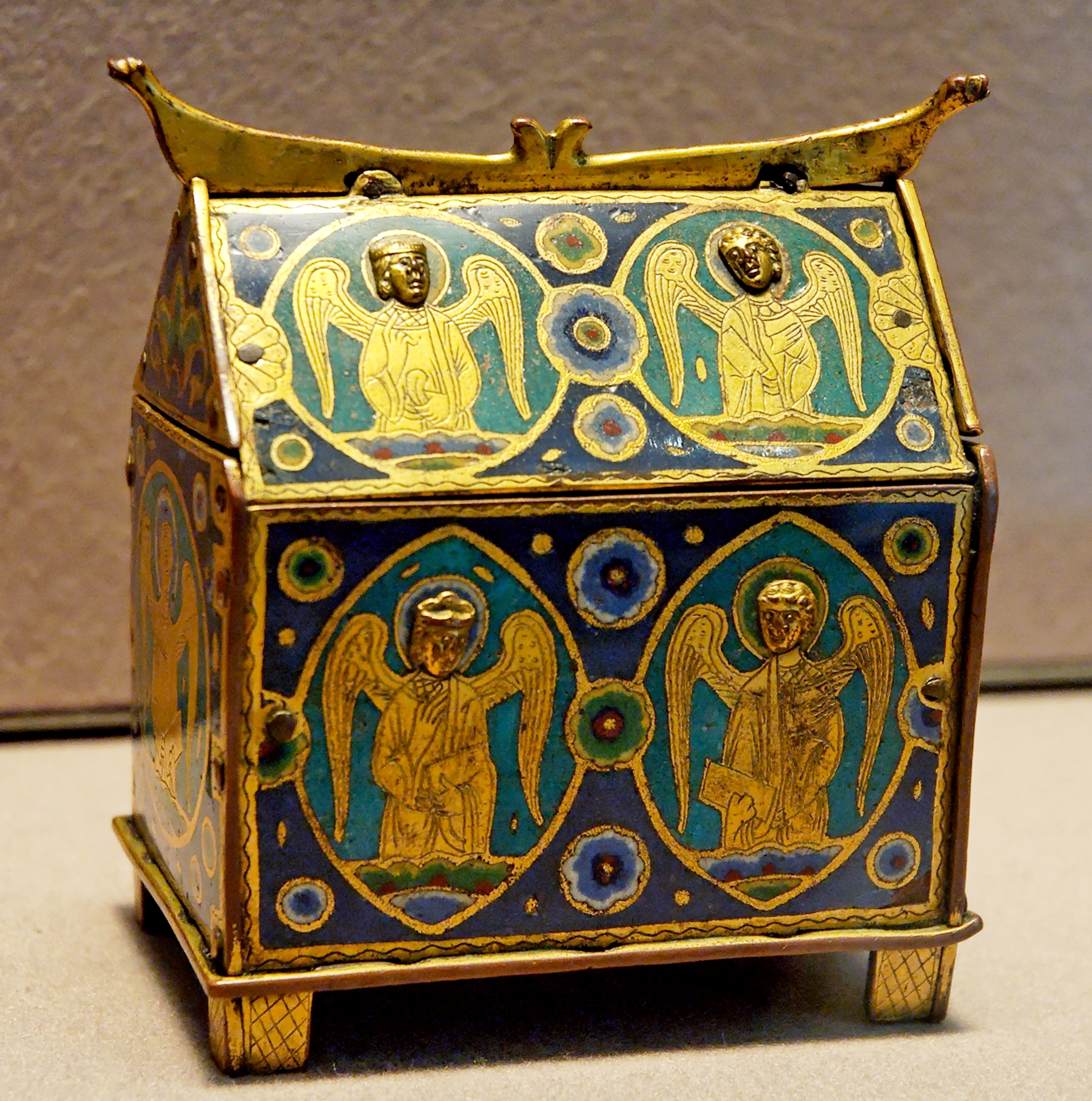
Early 13th-century chasse used to hold holy oils

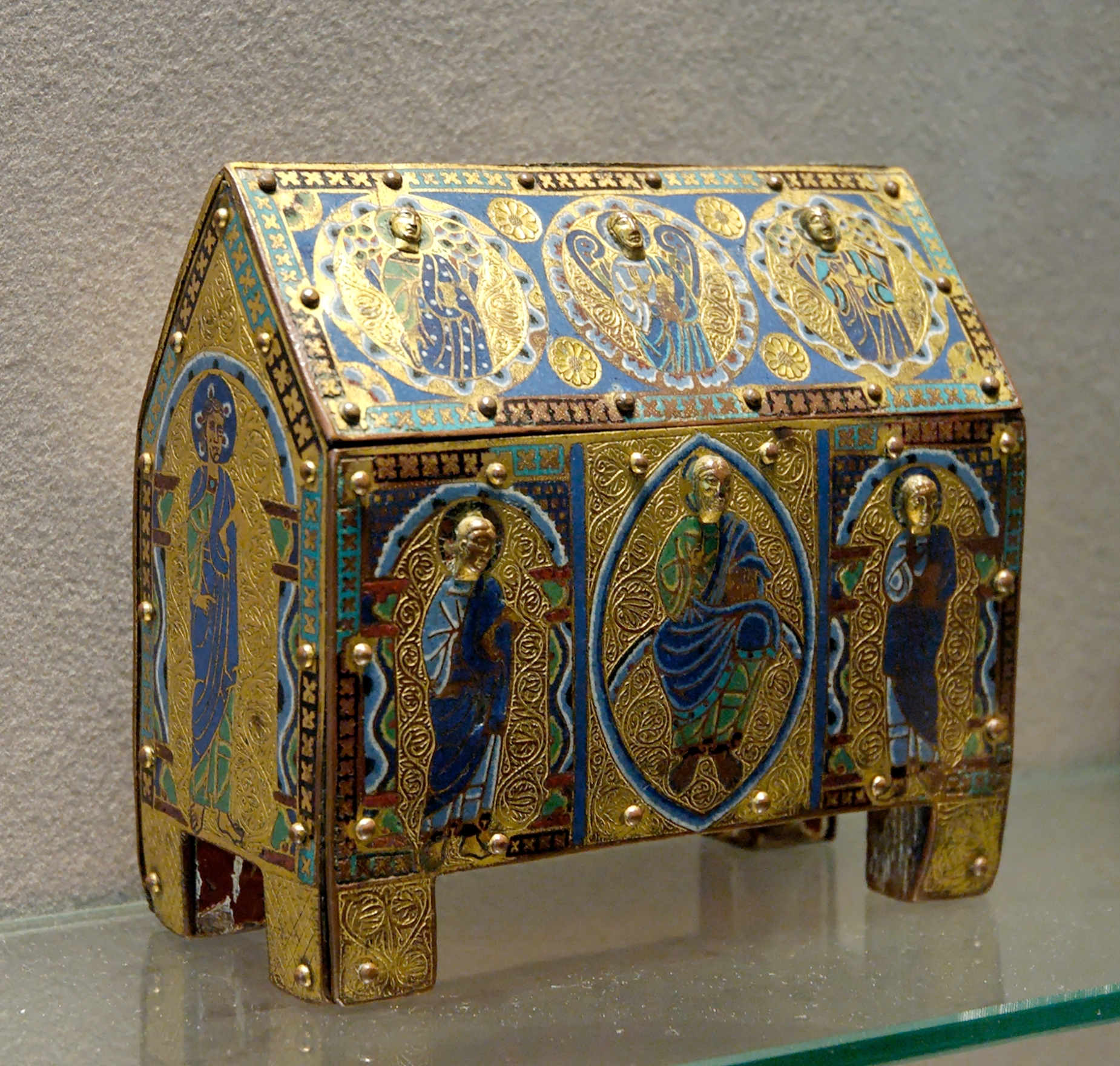
Example with vermiculated gilded background, and enamelled figures.

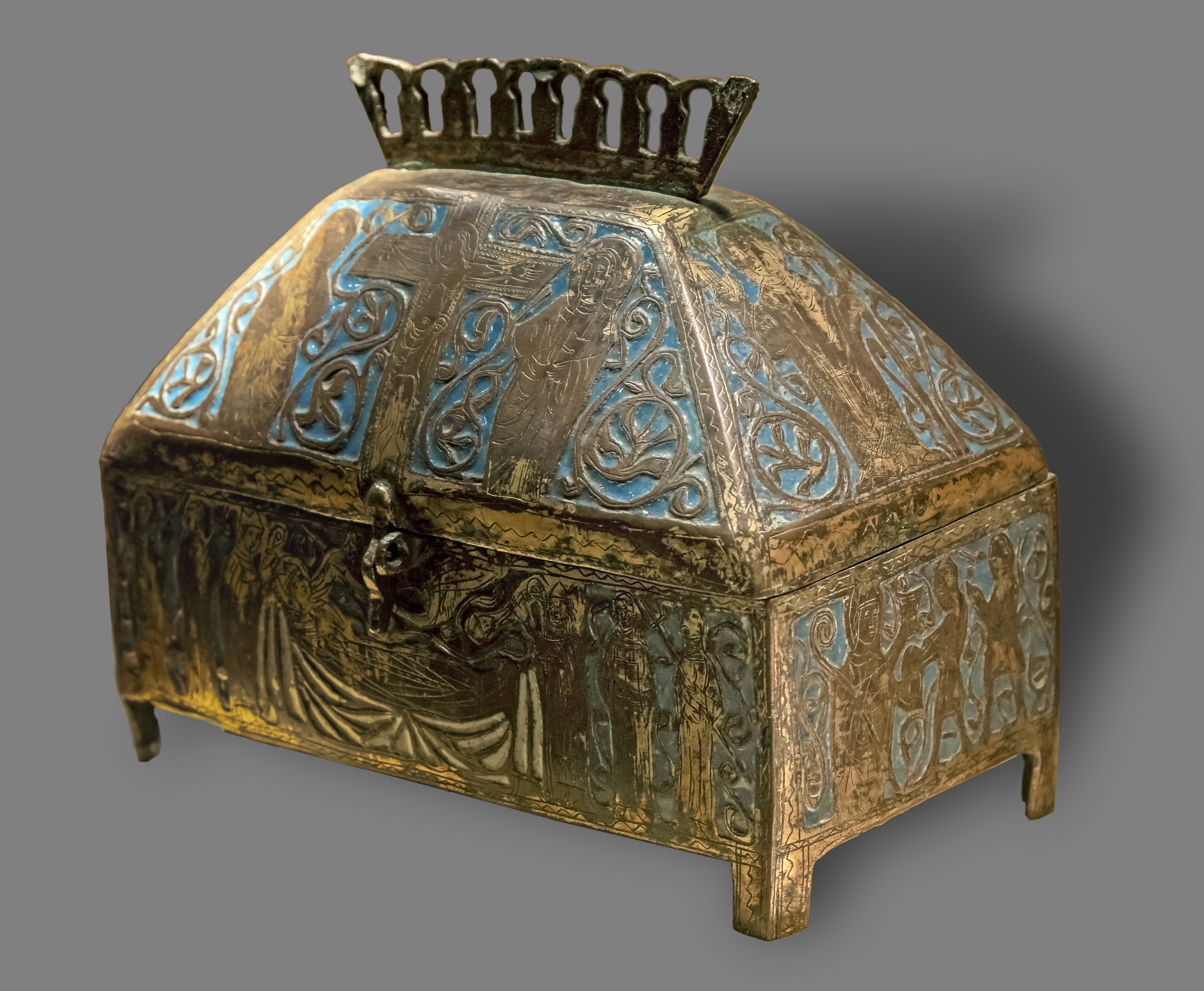
13th-century Chasse of Saint Exupère

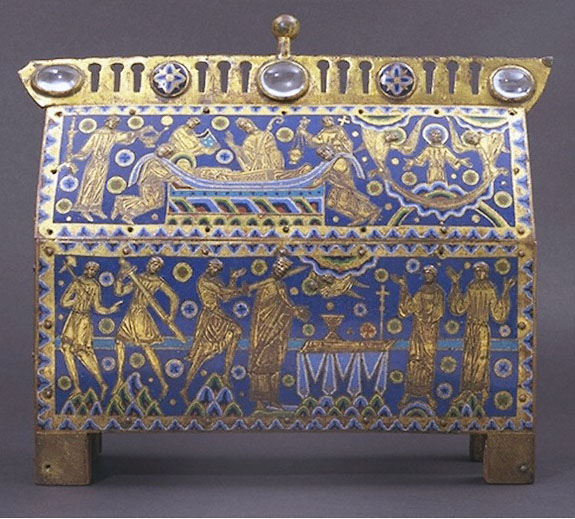
The Becket Casket, c. 1180-1190, Limoges, with the popular subject of the martyrdom of Thomas Becket.

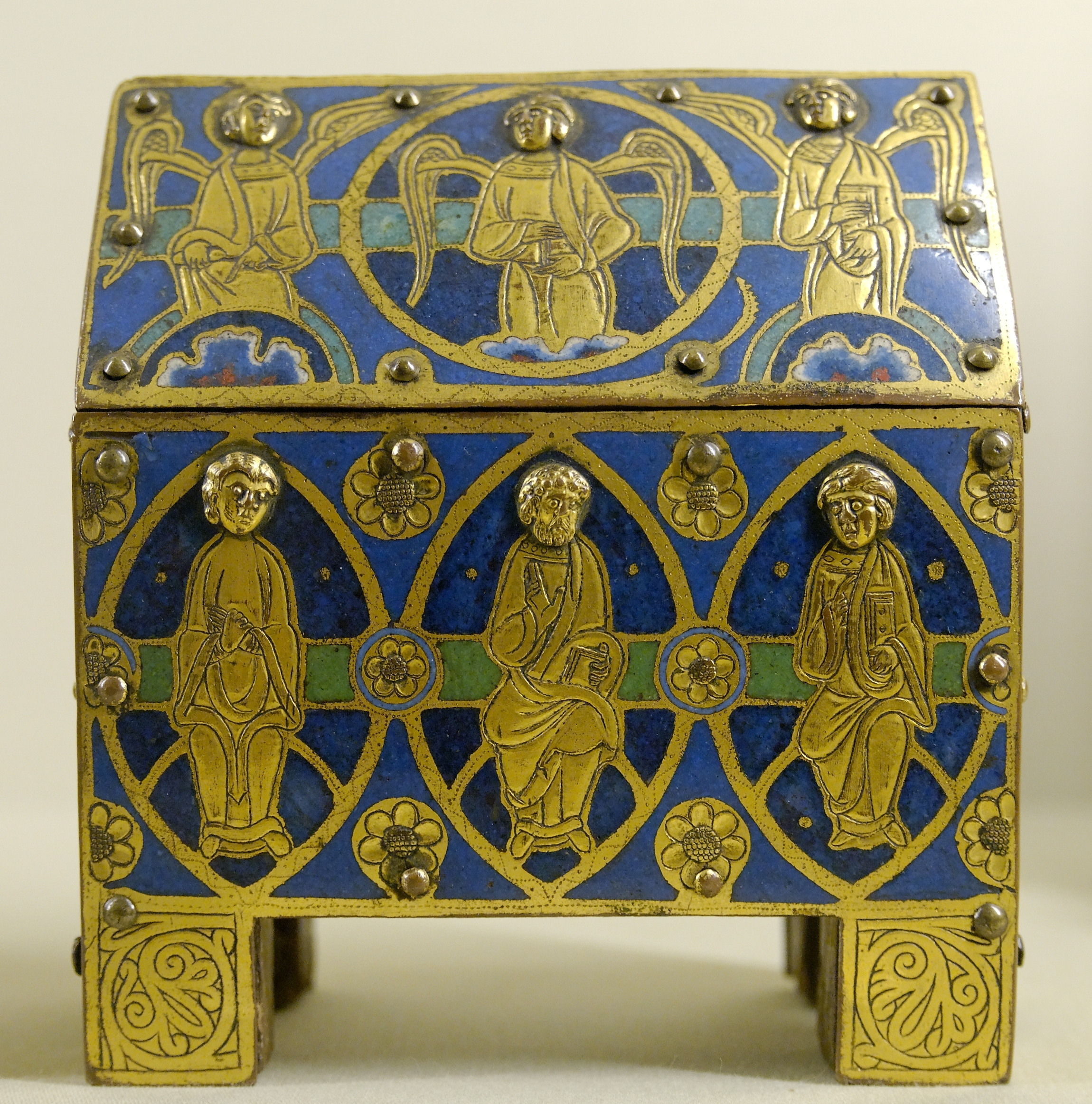
Limoges, with apostles and angels

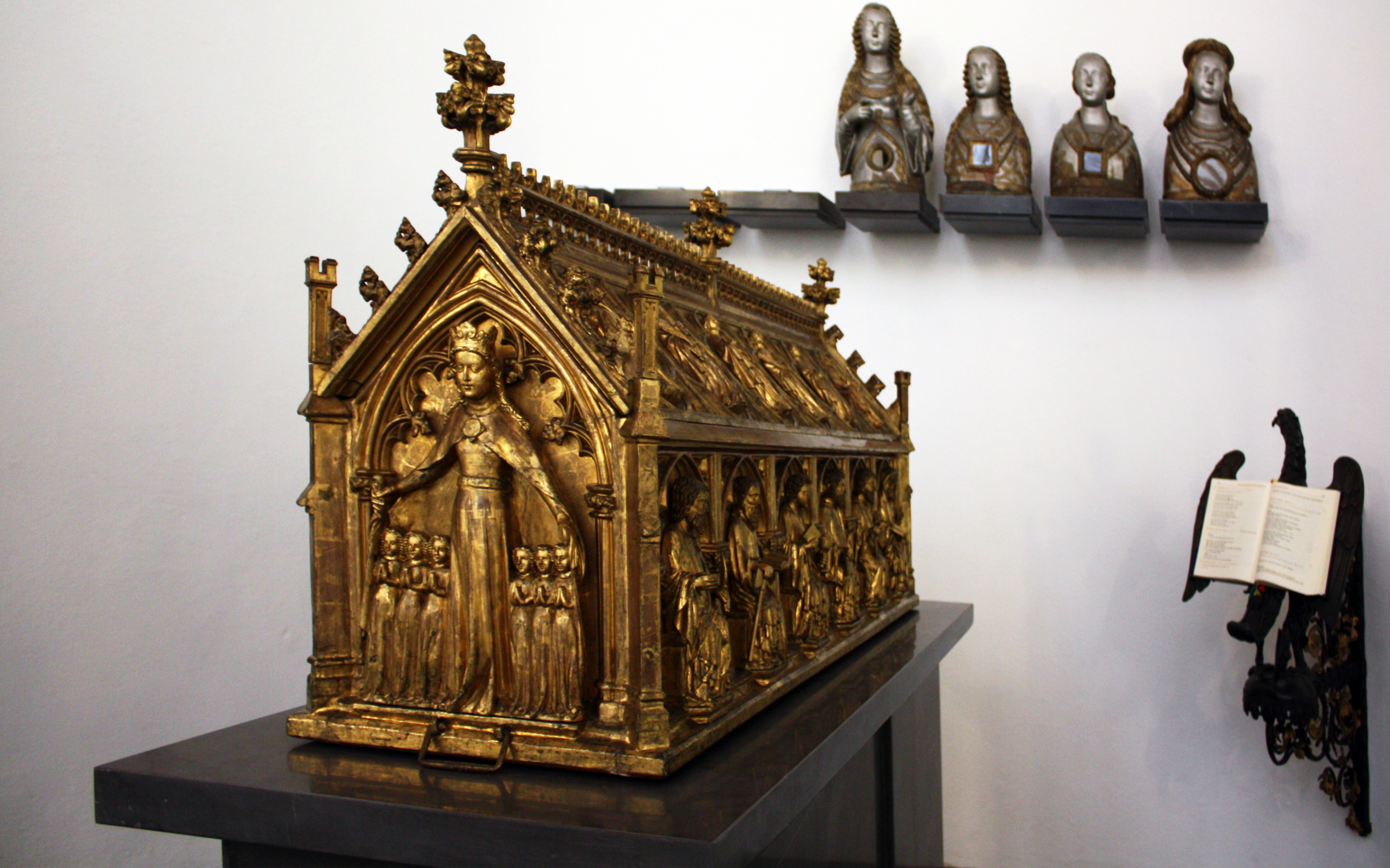
Gothic goldsmith's chasse, Cologne

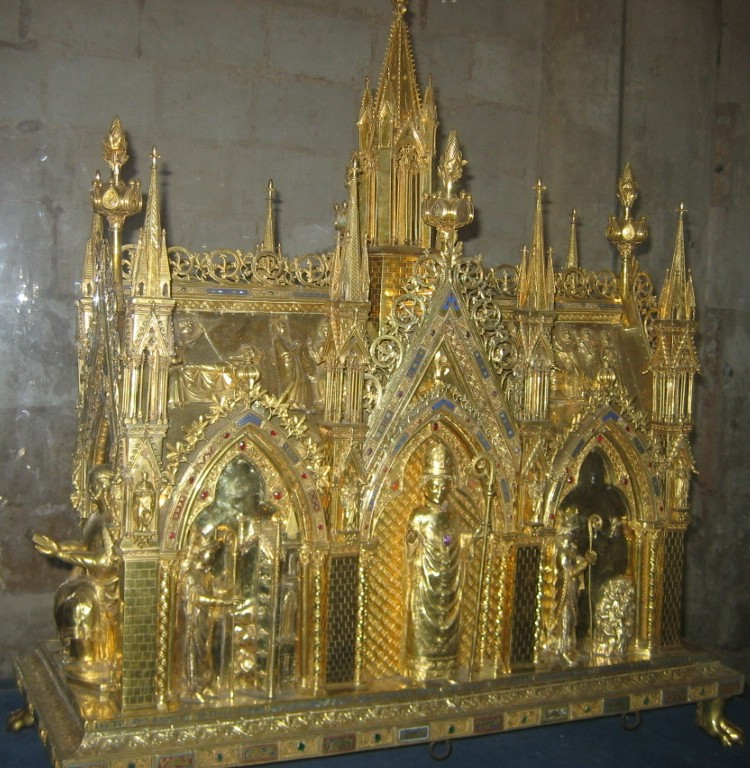
Very elaborate French 13th-century chasse reliquary of Saint Taurin, Évreux (Eure)

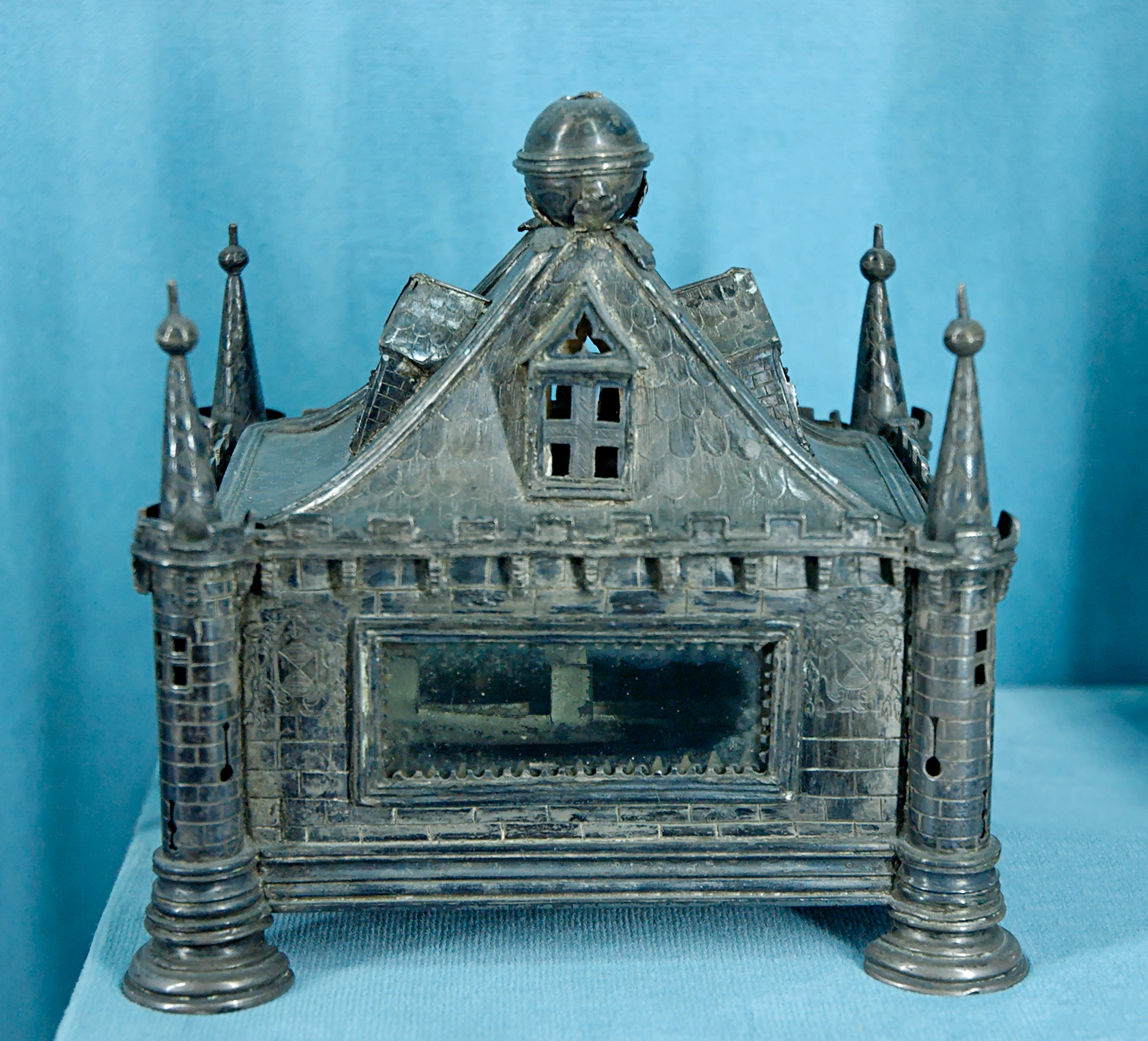
Later French reliquary; certainly a house, but perhaps not a chasse

== Notes ==
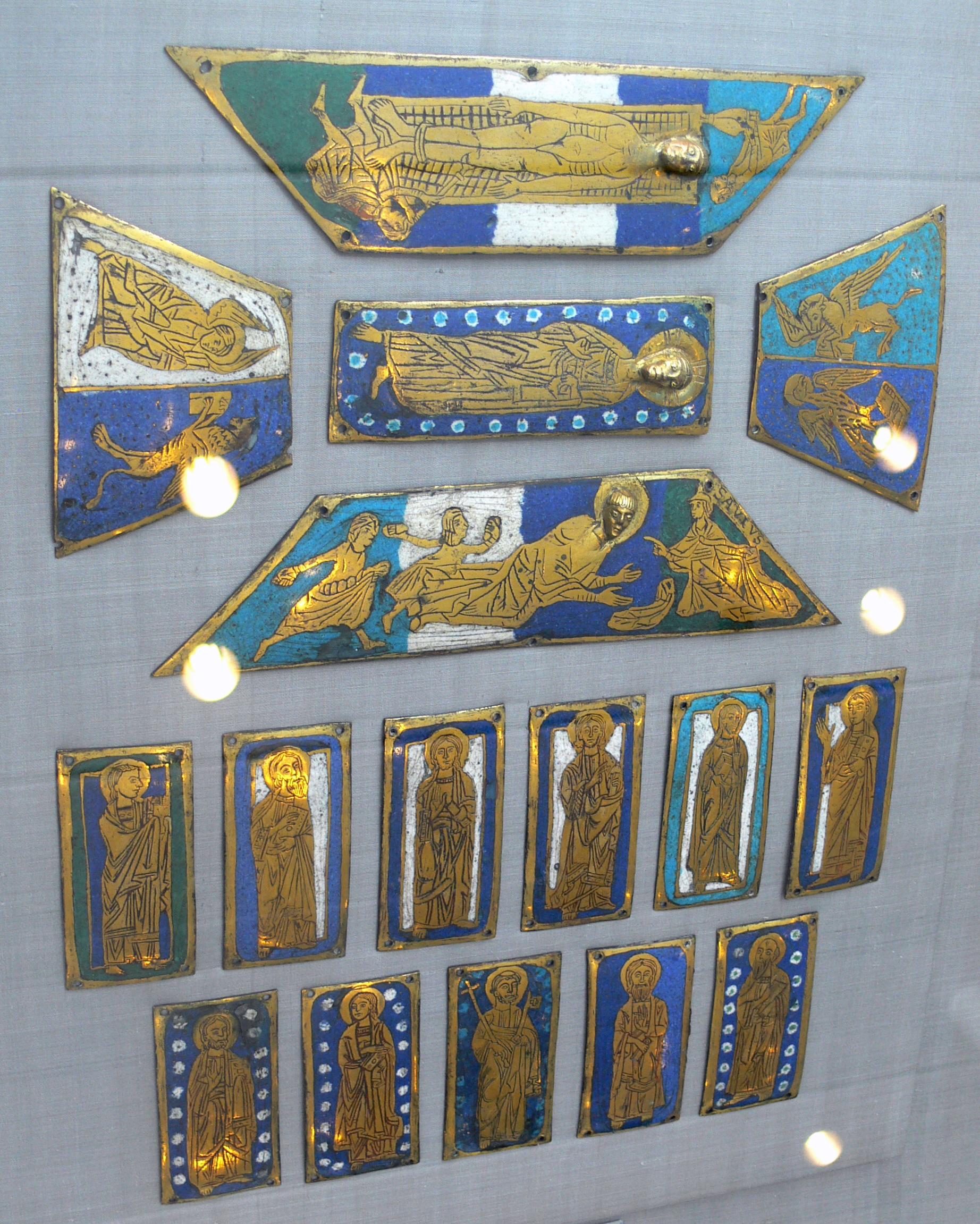
Enamelled panels from a disassembled chasse
