= Champlevé =

Enamelling technique

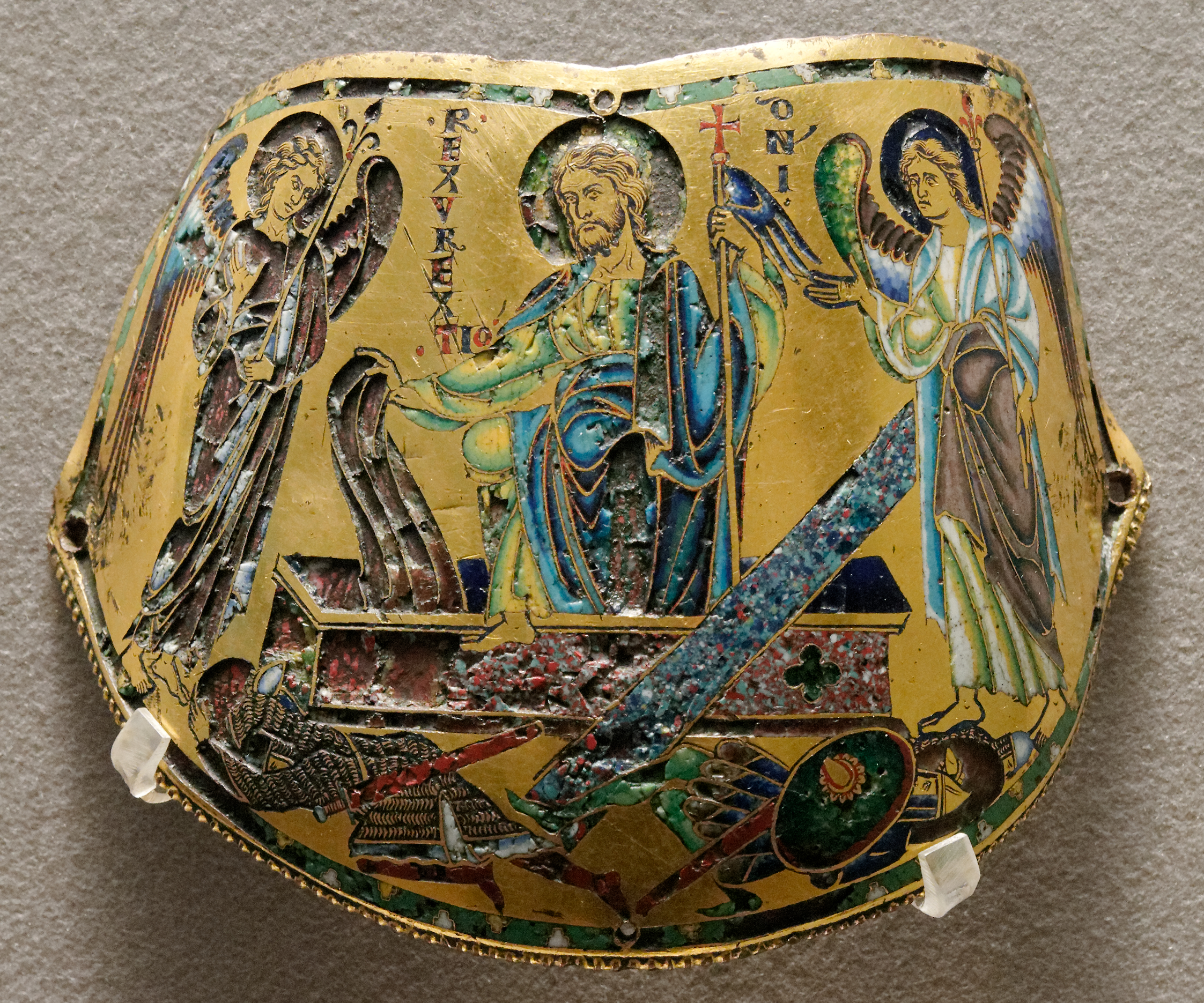
High-quality Mosan 12th century armlet, somewhat damaged, so showing the cast recesses for the enamel

Champlevé is an enamelling technique in the decorative arts, or an object made by that process, in which troughs or cells are carved, etched, die struck, or cast into the surface of a metal object, and filled with vitreous enamel. The piece is then fired until the enamel fuses, and when cooled, the surface of the object is polished. The uncarved portions of the original surface remain visible as a frame for the enamel designs; typically, they are gilded in medieval work. The name comes from the French for "raised field", "field" meaning background, though the technique in practice lowers the area to be enamelled rather than raising the rest of the surface.

The technique has been used since ancient times, though it is no longer among the most commonly used enamelling techniques. Champlevé is suited to the covering of relatively large areas, and figurative images, although it was first prominently used in Celtic art for geometric designs. In Romanesque art, its potential was fully used, decorating caskets, plaques, and vessels, in Limoges enamel and that from other centres.

Champlevé is distinguished from the technique of cloisonné enamel in which the troughs are created by soldering flat metal strips to the surface of the object. The difference between the techniques is analogous to the woodworking techniques of intarsia and marquetry. It differs from the basse-taille technique, which succeeded it in the highest quality Gothic work, in that the bottoms of the recesses for the enamel are rough. So only opaque enamel colours are used. In basse-taille, the recesses are modelled, and translucent enamels are used, for more subtle effects, as in the 14th-century Parisian Royal Gold Cup.

== Early champlevé ==
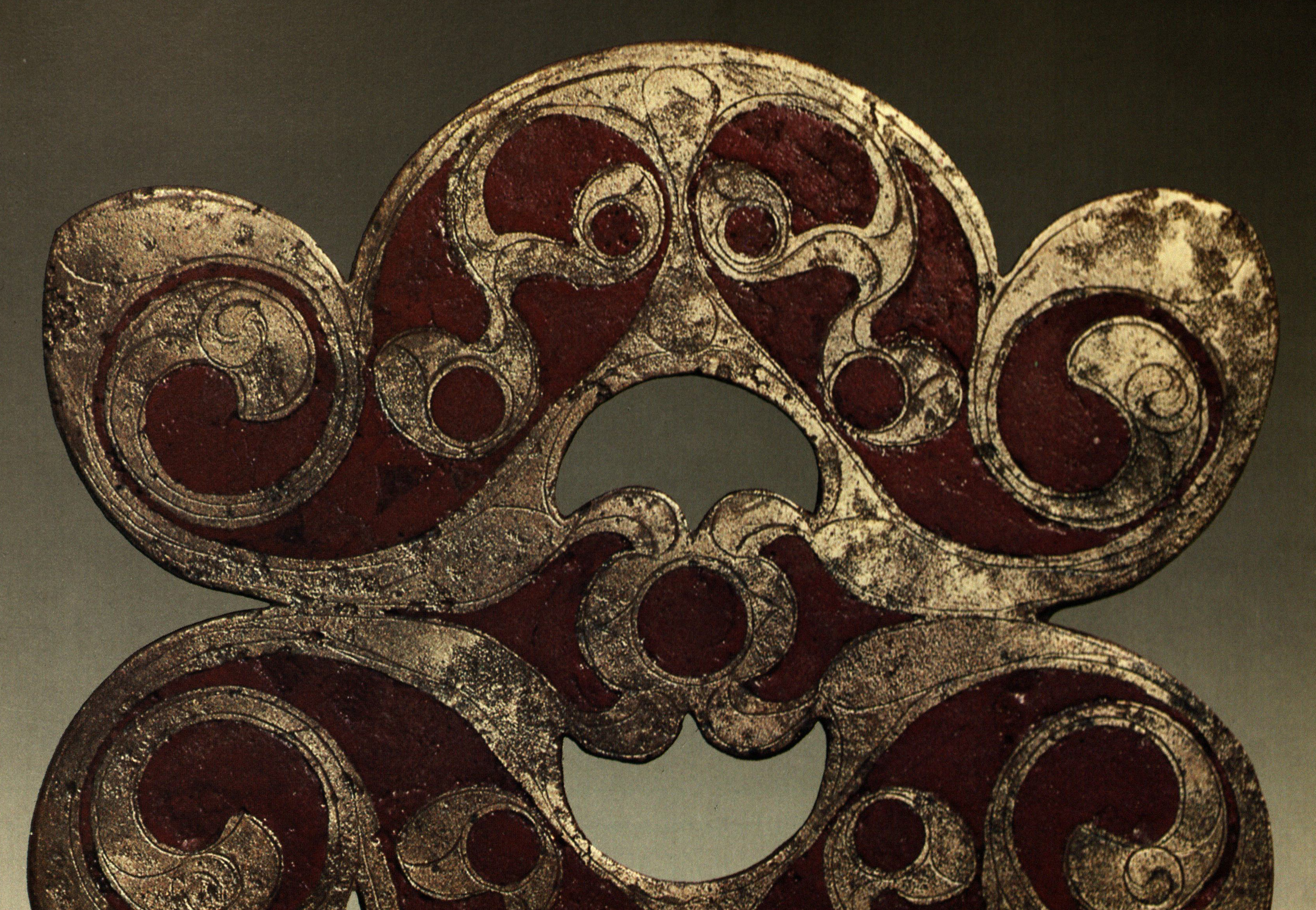
Celtic red enamel on horse-harness, Britain, c. AD 50

Enamel was first used on small pieces of jewellery, and has often disintegrated in ancient pieces that have been buried. Consistent and frequent use of champlevé technique is first seen in the La Tène style of early Celtic art in Europe, from the 3rd or 2nd century BC, where the predominant colour was a red, possibly intended as an imitation of red coral (as used on the Witham Shield). The base was usually bronze. The "Insular Celts" of the British Isles made widespread use of the technique, seen as highlights on the relief decoration of the Battersea Shield and other pieces. However this was technically not true enamel in the usual sense of the word, as the glass was only heated until it became a soft paste before being pushed into place. This is sometimes informally known as "sealing-wax" enamelling, and may be described as "glass inlay" or similar terms. True enamelling technique, where glass paste is put into place and fired until it liquefies, was learnt from the Romans. The earliest literary description of enamel is from the Greek sophist Philostratus III, who wrote in his Icones (Bk I, 28), describing polychrome horse-harness: "It is said that the barbarians in the Ocean pour these colours on heated bronze and that they adhere, become as hard as stone and preserve the designs that are made on them".

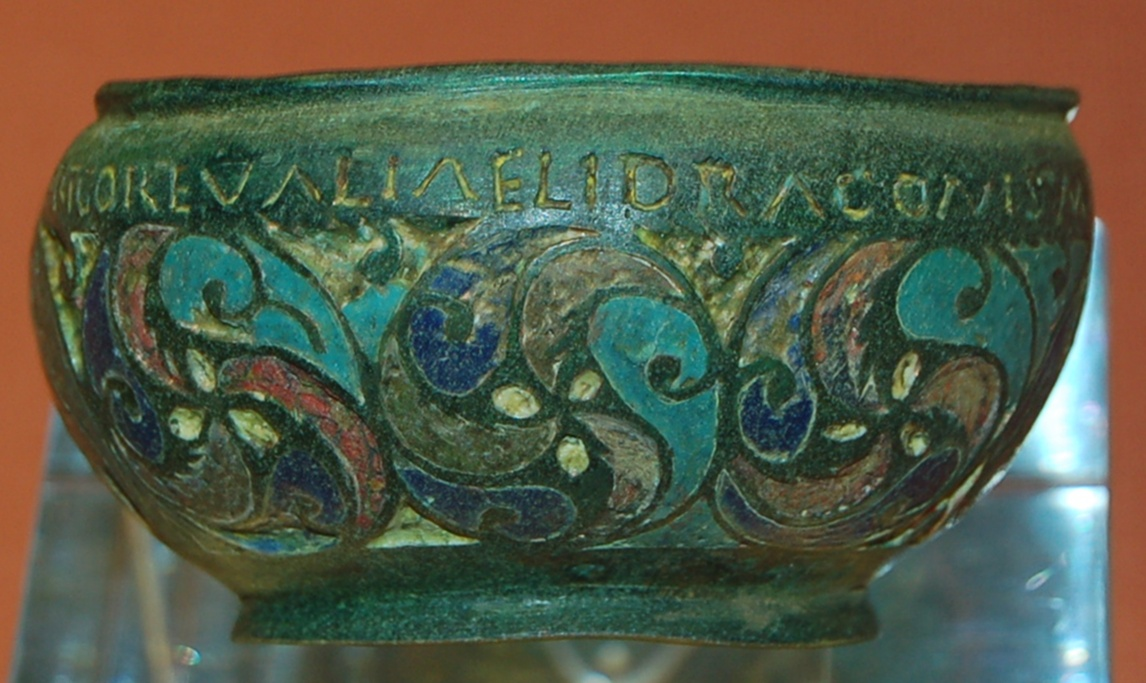
The Staffordshire Moorlands Pan, 2nd century AD Romano-British, with enamel in four colours.

Celtic curvilinear styles were highly effective in enamel and were used throughout the Roman period, when they largely disappeared in other media. The Staffordshire Moorlands Pan is a 2nd-century trulla with large enamel roundels in four colours of enamel, commissioned by or for Draco, a soldier, possibly a Greek, as a souvenir of his service on Hadrian's Wall. It is one of a group of similar enamelled vessels found in Britain and northern Gaul. Smaller items from similar contexts include brooches and other jewellery, and mounts for horse harness as described by Philostratus. Around the end of the Roman Empire, new forms arose: the terminals of the increasingly fancy penannular brooches of the British Isles become decorated with champlevé, as do other fasteners and fittings, and the mounts of hanging bowls. These last have long puzzled art historians, as not only is their purpose unclear, but they are primarily found in Anglo-Saxon and Viking contexts, including three at Sutton Hoo, but their decoration uses predominantly Celtic motifs. One of the Sutton Hoo bowls had been repaired, but in a different, Germanic style. Altogether, production of the various types of hanging bowls covers the period 400–1100. While the leading expert, Rupert Bruce-Mitford, sees the bowls as the products of "Celtic" workshops, perhaps often in Ireland, in the same period the use of large areas of champlevé in the most ornate Celtic brooches reduces. However, gem-like enamel highlights, some in millefiori, are still found. In Anglo-Saxon art, as in that of most of Europe and the Byzantine world, this was the period when cloisonné technique dominated enamelling.

== Romanesque ==
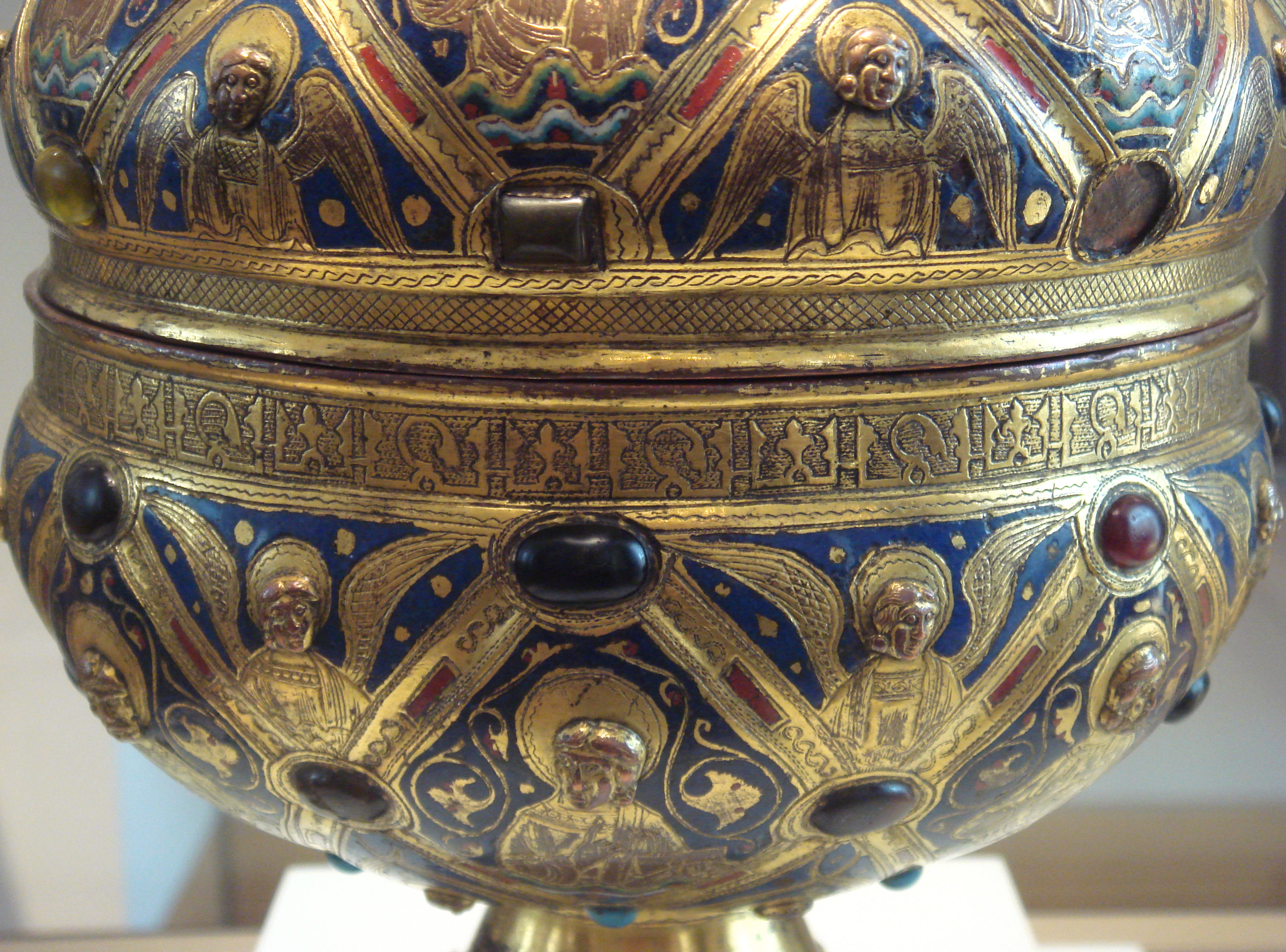
Elaborate Limoges ciborium, c. 1200

Champlevé is especially associated with Romanesque art, and many of the finest survivals of the style feature the technique. There was a significant increase in the use of the method in several areas in the late 11th century, coinciding with the maturation of the Romanesque style. The immediate source of the style remains obscure; various exotic origins have been suggested, but the significant expansion in the use of stained glass at the same period is probably connected. Copper or bronze bases were typically used, which were soft and easy to work with, as well as relatively inexpensive. However, as they discolored in heat, opaque enamels needed to be used. Blue was now the dominant colour, as in stained glass. The best blues in painting (whether on a wall, panel, or manuscript) were very expensive, whereas in glass, rich blues are easily obtainable.

Mosan and Limoges enamels are the most famous, and the figures carved in the copper plate display a superb sense of line. The Stavelot Triptych in New York is an example of the finest Mosan work, and the Becket Casket in London a fine early piece from Limoges. The names of several Mosan goldsmith-enamellers are known. Relief and fully modelled figures were also enamelled, and some metal bases were formed by hammering into moulds. The Limoges production increased steadily in quantity, and by the Gothic period, had declined in quality, but provided a relatively inexpensive product, especially of chasse caskets, which were produced on a semi-industrial scale and exported all over Europe. Spanish enamels, not easily distinguished from Limoges work, were also made on a large scale. Mosan work was sometimes made of gold or silver-gilt, but in Limoges and Spain, gilt-copper is more common, and much Mosan work also uses this technique, as illustrated in the example. This example also shows the mixing of different colours and shades within the same cell, here used throughout the design in a complex manner, whereas in the Limoges examples below, much less, and much simpler, use is made of this challenging technique.

A similar technique was known as "shippou-zogan" in Japan, where it was considered a form of damascening.

== Gallery ==
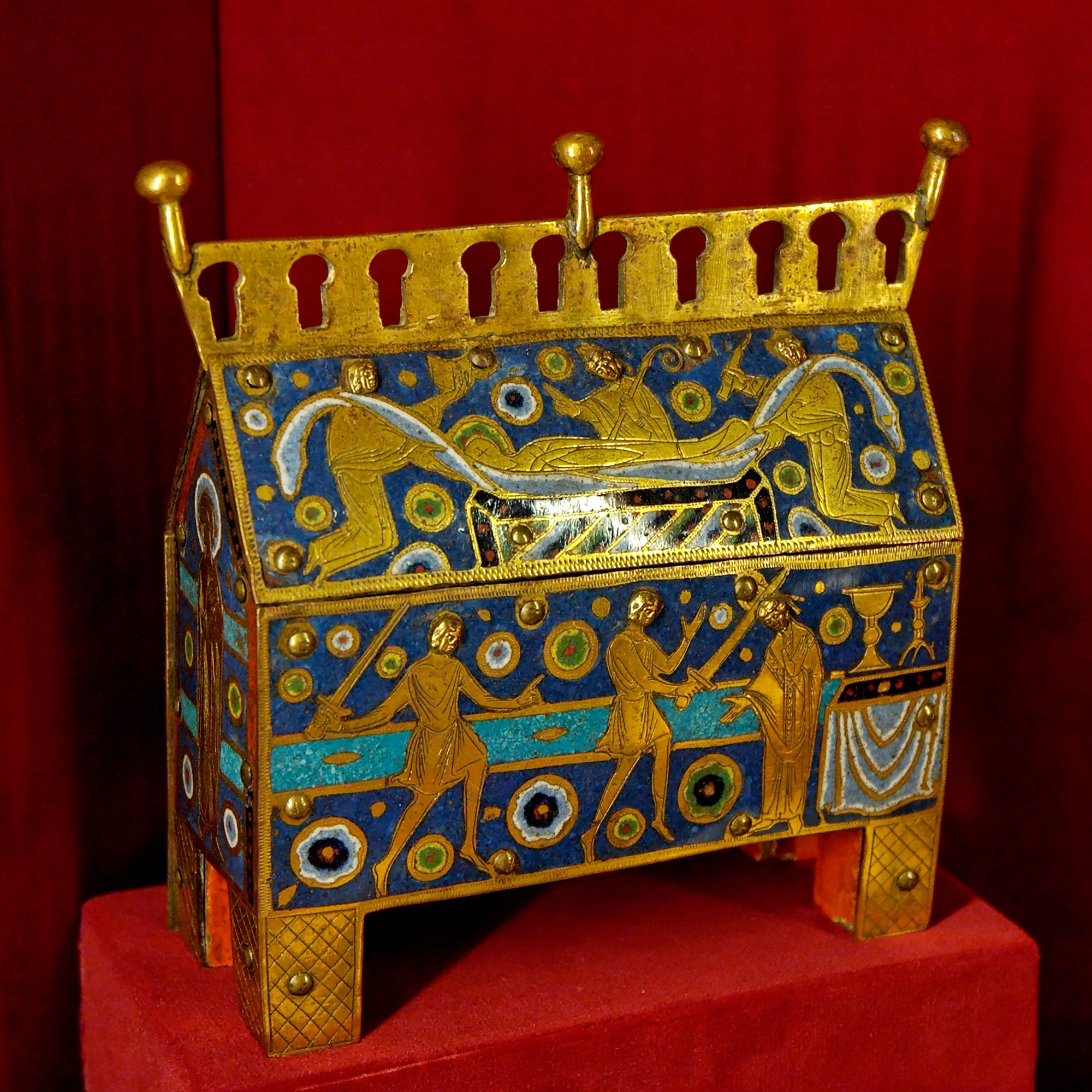
Champlevé gilt-copper reliquary in typical "chasse" shape with scenes from the story of Thomas Becket. Made in Spain, also a centre of medieval enamelling.

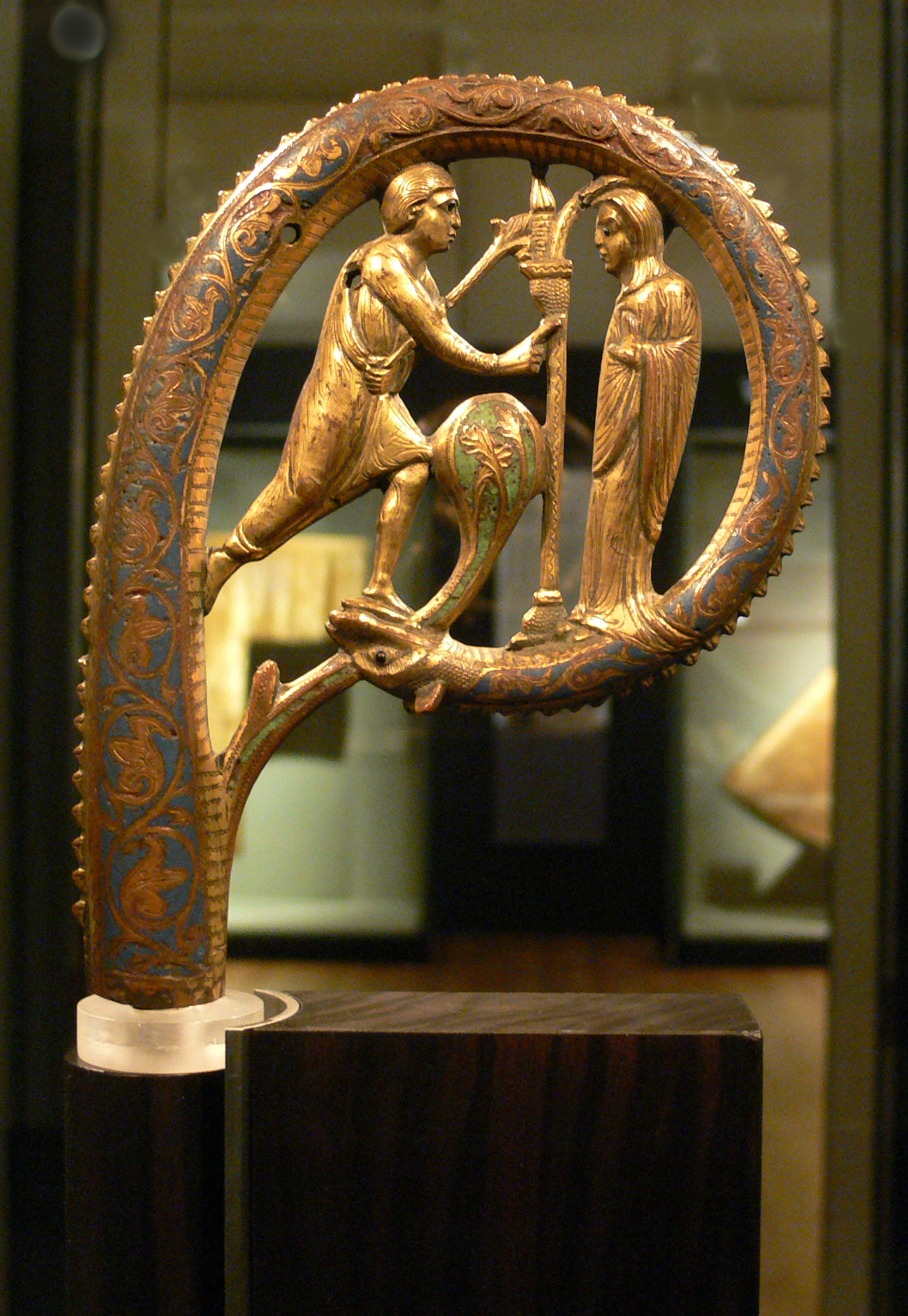
Crozier, Limoges, 1st half of 13th century, with Annunciation scene.

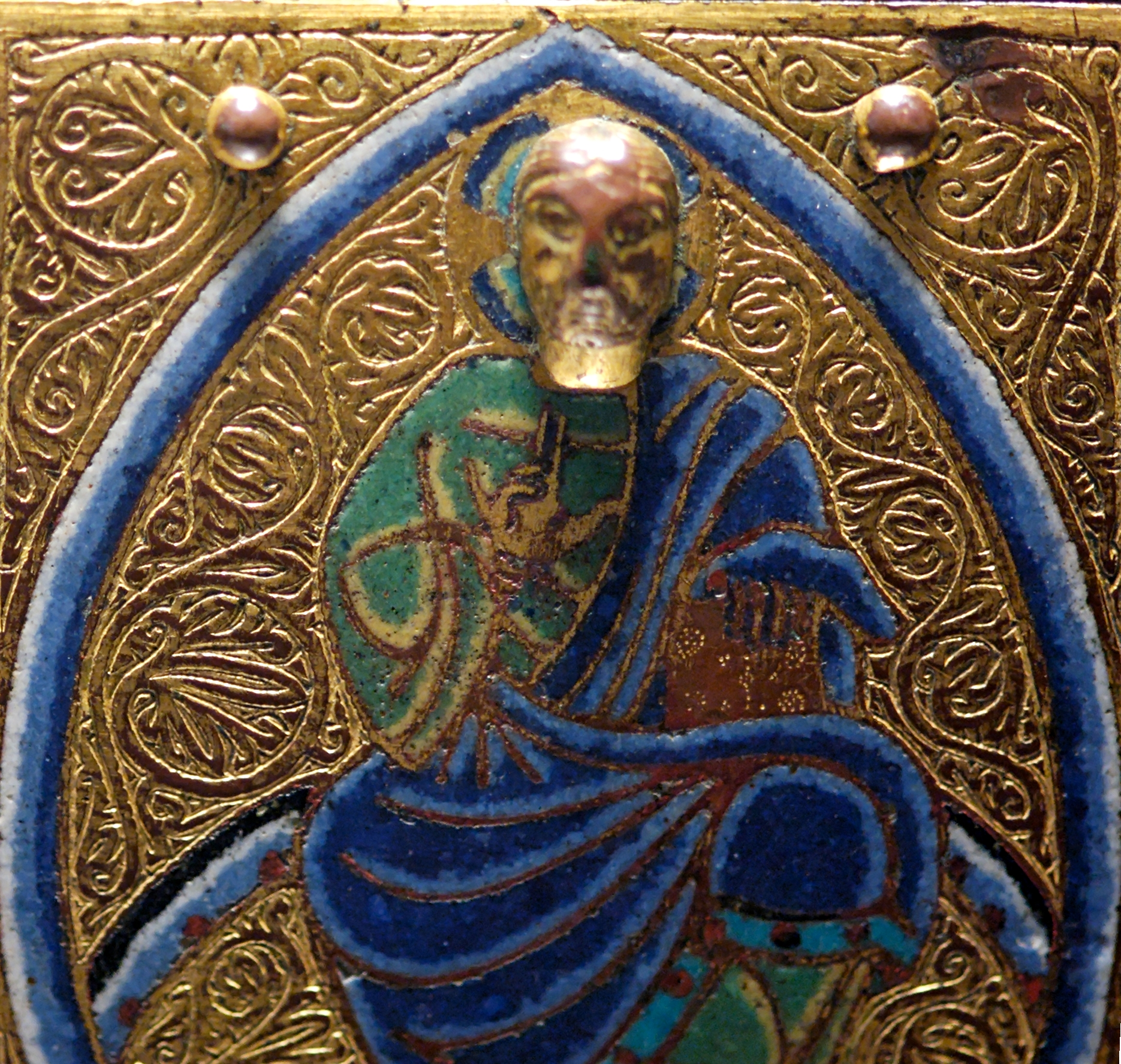
Detail from 13th century Limoges chasse, with a projecting modelled head on a flat background.

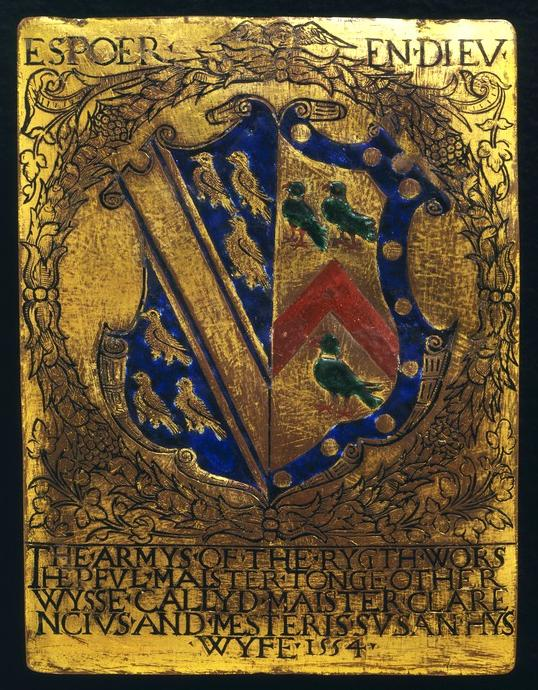
1554, later champlevé enamel plaque on copper, V&A Museum no. 4358-1857

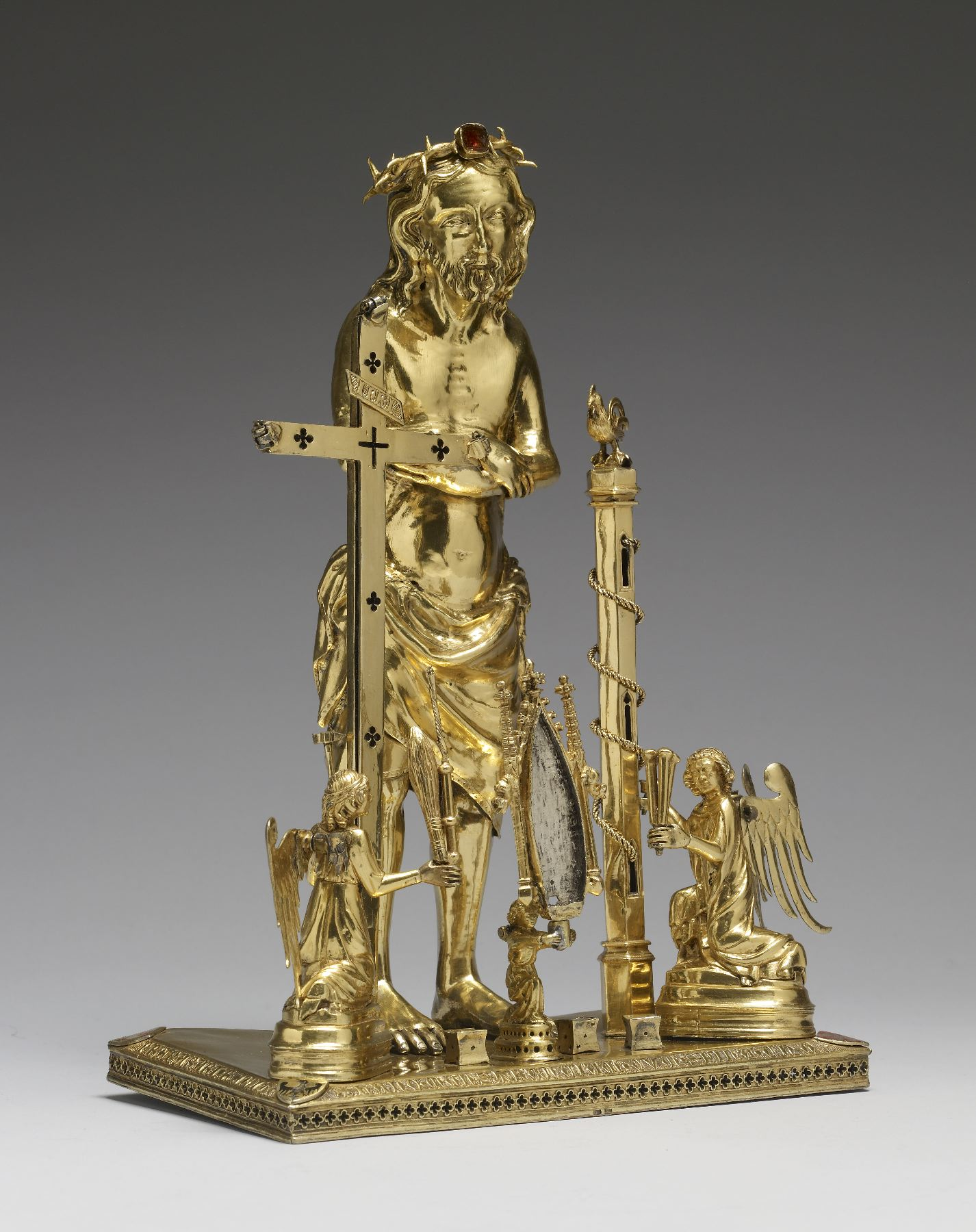
Gilded silver, silver, champlevé enamel, glass paste (imitation ruby). Reliquary with the Man of Sorrows. Walters Art Museum

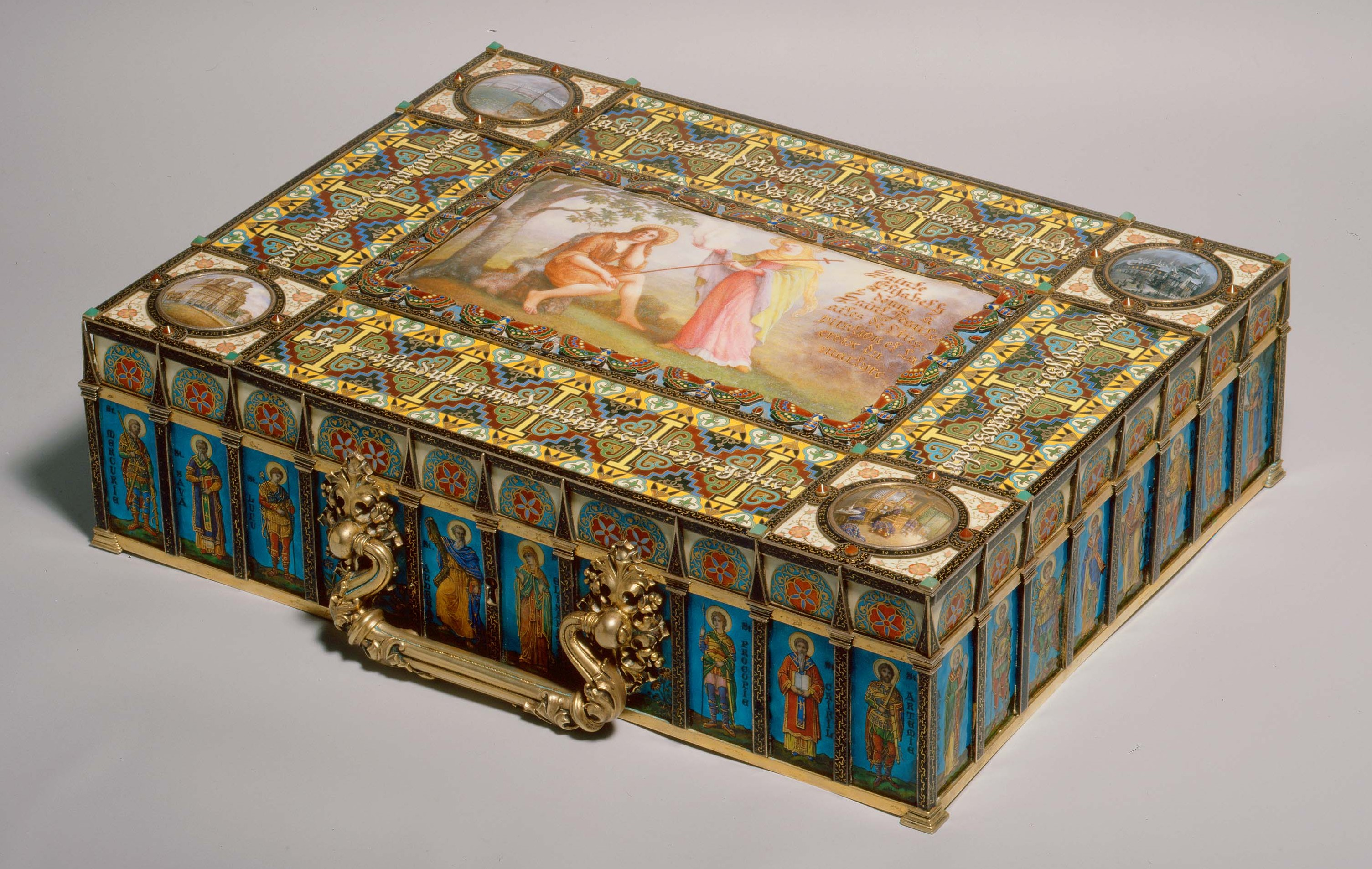
Casket with champlevé portraits commissioned by Queen Elisabeth of Romania as a gift for the artist Jean-Jules-Antoine Lecomte du Nouÿ. Khalili Collection of Enamels of the World
