= Jean du Tillet =

Jean du Tillet may refer to either of two brothers:

- Jean du Tillet, sieur de La Bussière (died 2 October 1570), archivist and historian
- Jean du Tillet (bishop) (died 18 December 1570), antiquarian
