= Throne of Dagobert =

7th-century bronze throne of the French monarchs

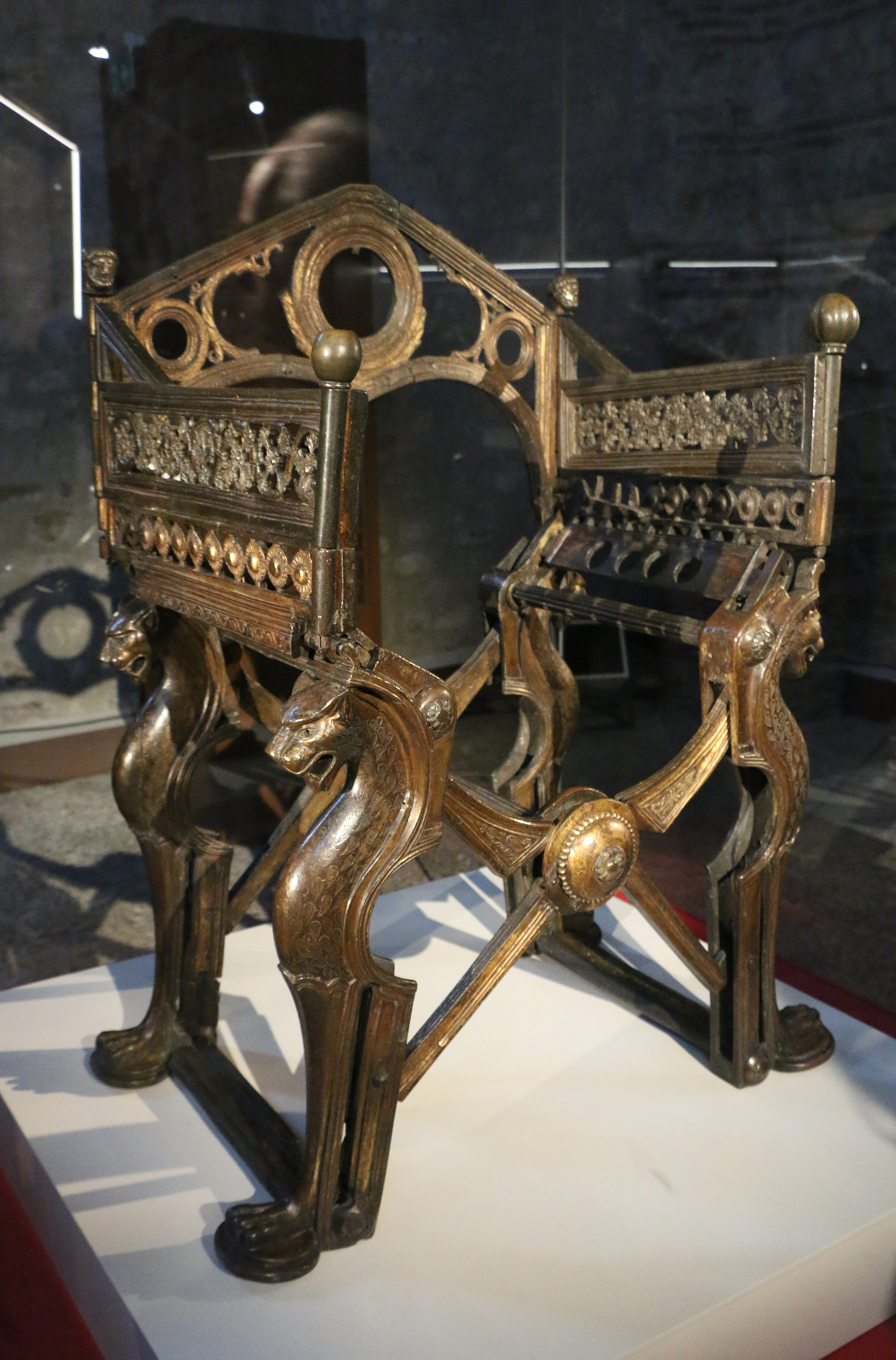
Throne of Dagobert

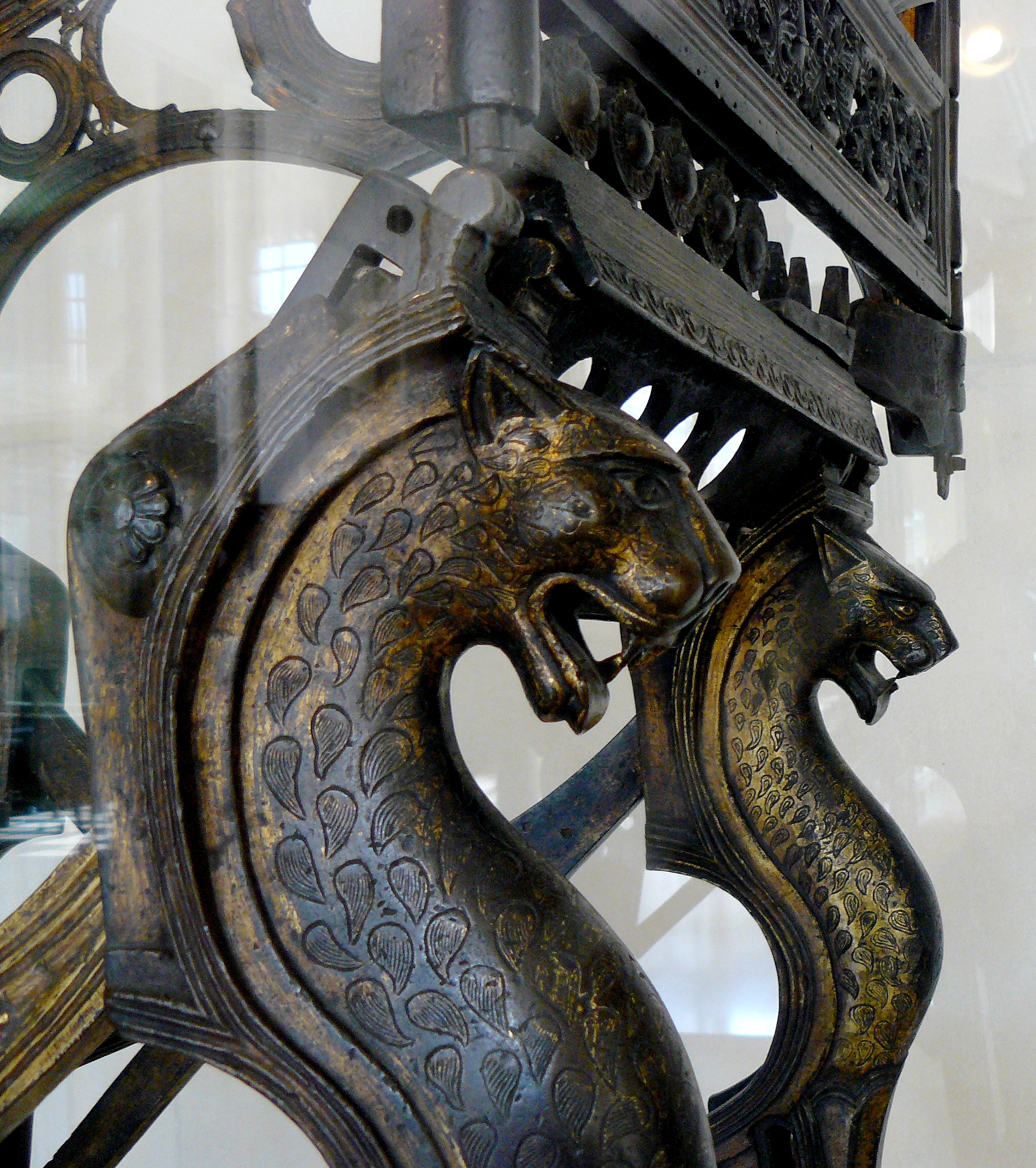
Detail of leopard heads

The Throne of Dagobert or Chair of Dagobert is a bronze chair made in the early Middle Ages and long associated with the Frankish and later French monarchy. After having been kept for centuries at the Abbey of Saint-Denis, it is now at the Cabinet des médailles of the Bibliothèque nationale de France in Paris.

== History and description ==
All parts of the throne are made of bronze. The lower part is shaped as a curule seat decorated with four leopard heads, three of which are believed to be original. This was initially a faldstool or folding chair intended for an itinerant monarch, with leather bands probably used for seating. Its date has long been debated. In the 1850s it was believed to be as recent as the 11th century. A later scholarly consensus attributed it to the Carolingian Renaissance, and the French National Library correspondingly estimates it between the late 8th and early 9th centuries. Recent examination, however, supports a 7th-century dating, consistent with the traditional attribution to Dagobert I, who died in 639, and legendary goldsmith Saint Eligius. The upper part, made of rinceaux-decorated armrests and a pedimented back, is generally thought to be Carolingian of the 9th century. The throne was repaired in the mid-12th century (the rear right-side leopard head may date from that era) and again in the late 13th century.

A similar throne, which may be the same object, appears in depictions of Carolingian ruler Lothair I and Capetian kings from Louis VII onwards.

The first unambiguous reference to the throne is in the mid-12th-century writing of Abbot Suger of Saint-Denis, who had it repaired. Suger wrote in his Liber de Rebus in Administratione sua Gestis (1147):

We also restored the noble throne of the glorious King Dagobert, on which, as tradition relates, the Frankish kings sat to receive the homage of their nobles after they had assumed power. We did so in recognition of its exalted function and because of the value of the work itself.

The throne retained iconic status until the end of the French ancien régime. In the mid-18th century it was referred to in the 18th stanza of the satirical song Le bon roi Dagobert, as "an old iron chair" (un vieux fauteuil de fer).

During the French Revolution it was transferred to the French National Library on 30 September 1791, together with several other precious objects of the treasury of Saint-Denis.

Napoleon I saw political value in claiming the Merovingian legacy, for example as he used bees inspired by jewels found at the tomb of Childeric I in Tournai as his emblem (as in the Flag of Elba). He was the last French monarch to sit on the throne of Dagobert, which he used at his coronation ceremony on 2 December 1804. Before that, he had taken the throne to the Camp of Boulogne for the first ceremonial granting of Legion of Honour decorations to soldiers on 6 August 1804. On that occasion, as lore has it, the ancient throne broke under his weight and had to be repaired; be that as it may, a poorly executed repair of that period makes the chair appear narrower than it really is.

In 1852 it was transferred to the Louvre, in which Napoleon III had created a section glorifying past rulers of France, dubbed the Musée des Souverains. The Bibliothèque Nationale recovered it in 1872, after that initiative was reversed following the fall of Napoleon III.

== Copies and influence ==
A cast-iron copy made in the early 19th century is located in the Saint-Denis Basilica on the same spot where the throne was kept during the French ancien régime. That copy was itself listed as a French monument historique in 1999. An electrotype copy is also mentioned in 1893 at the South Kensington Museum in London. Another copy, made in the 1970s, is kept at the Imperial Palace of Ingelheim near Mainz. A copy of the throne featured in the film The King (2019), where the Dauphin of France, Louis de Guyenne, sits on the mobile throne when he meets the king of England.

The throne's shape has inspired a type of furniture over many centuries, known as "style Dagobert" or "Dagobert armchair" (fauteuil Dagobert).

== Gallery ==
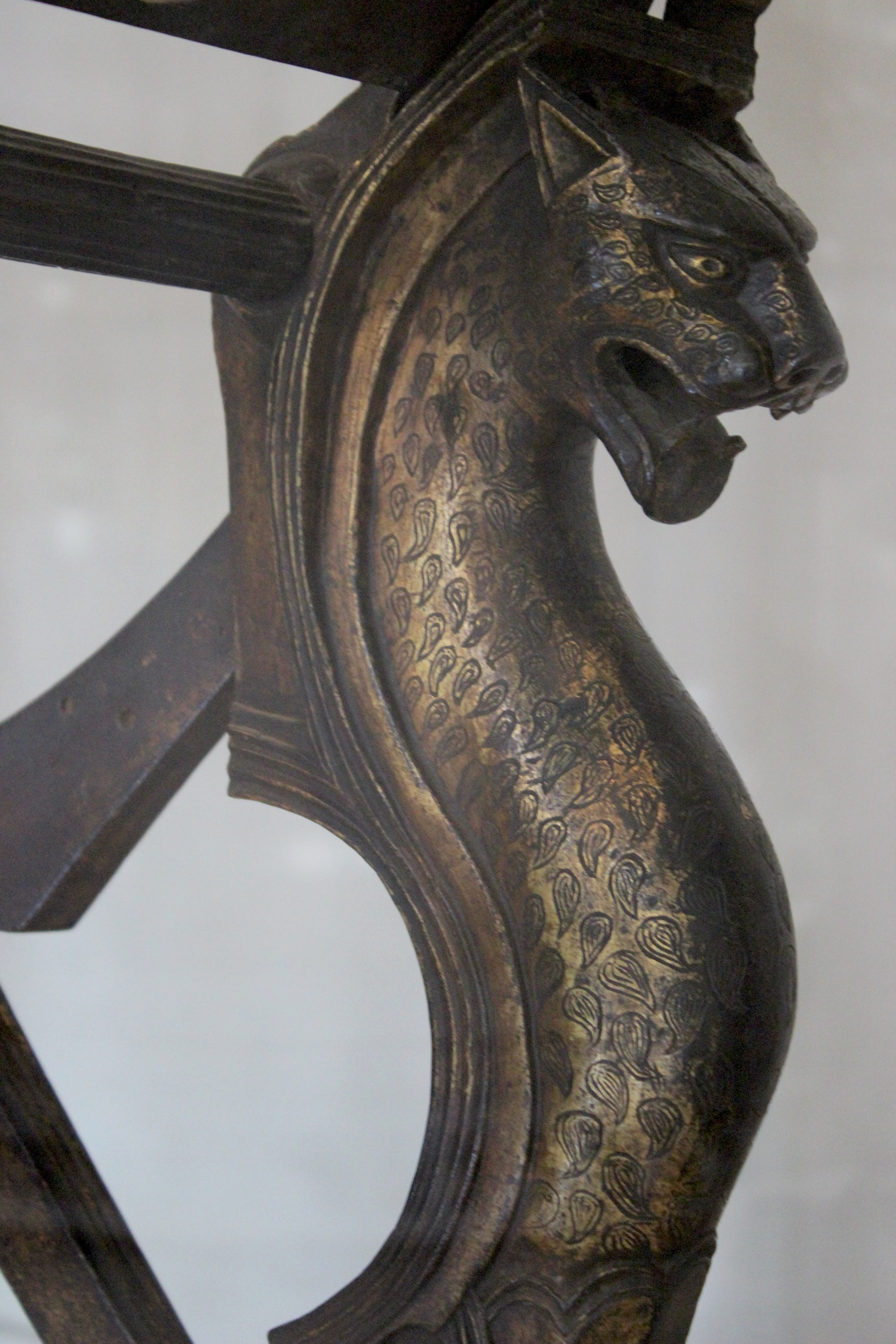
Leopard head detail

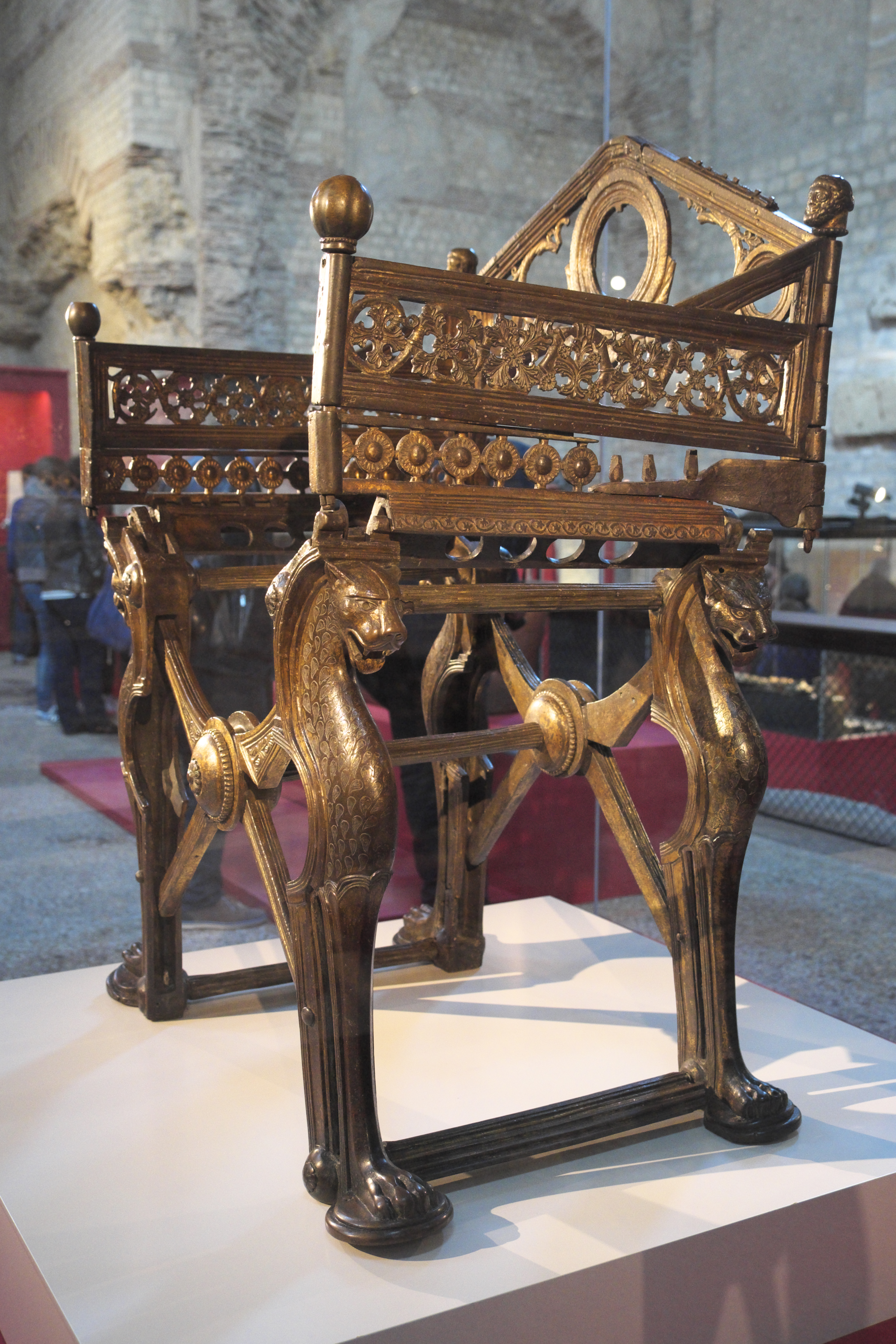
The throne on temporary display at the Thermes de Cluny

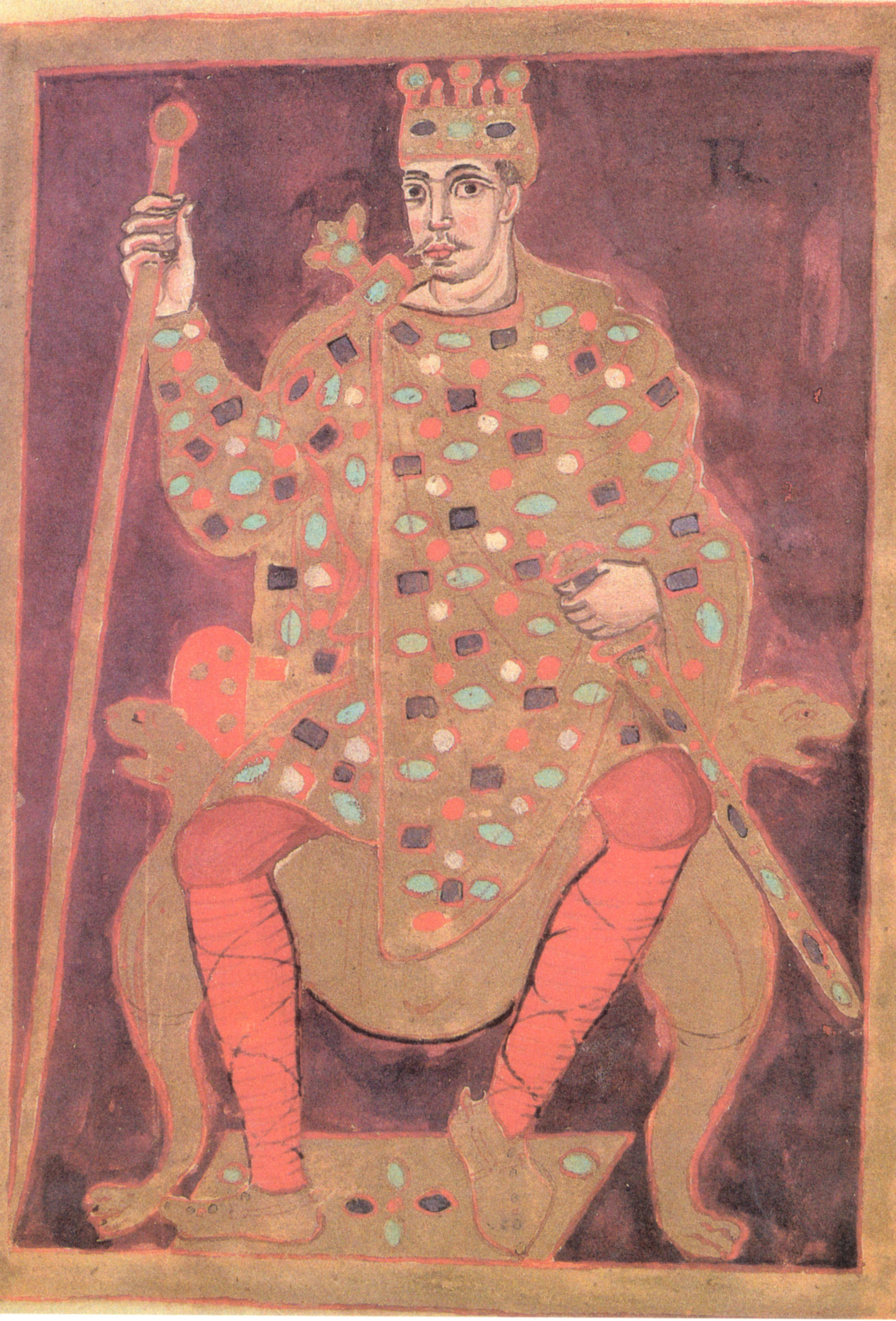
Lothair I depicted in the Lothar Psalter

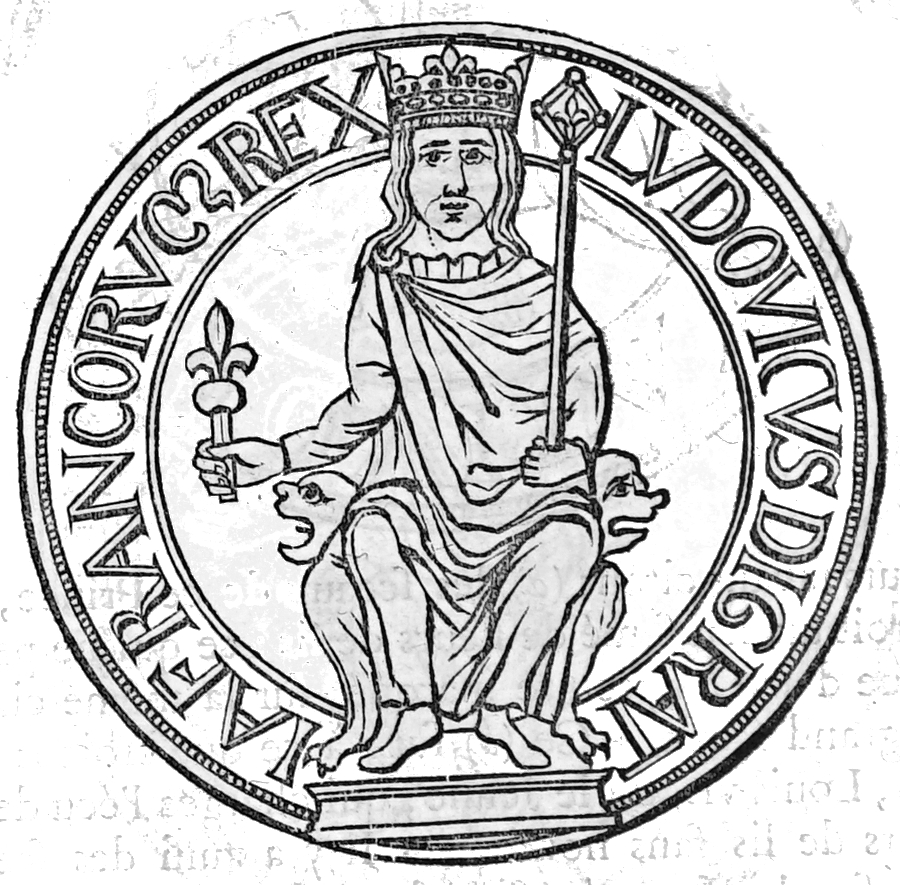
Seal of Louis VII

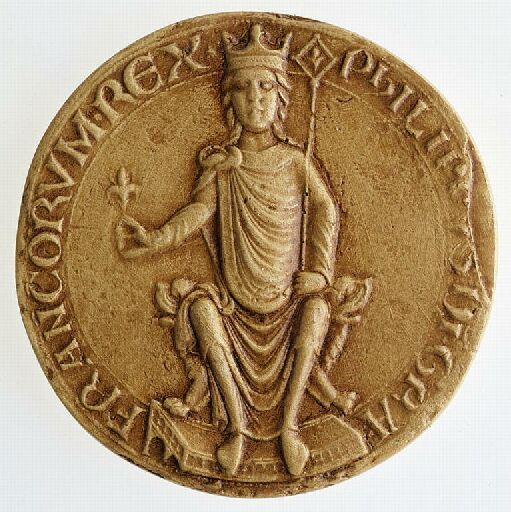
Seal of Philip II

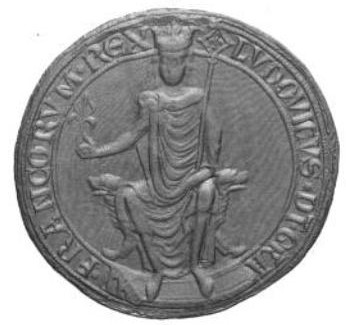
Seal of Louis VIII

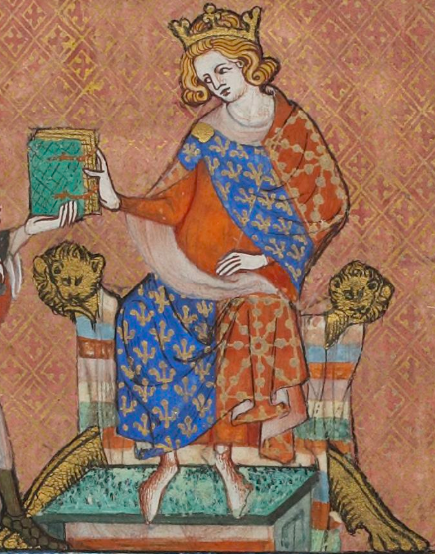
Miniature of Louis X

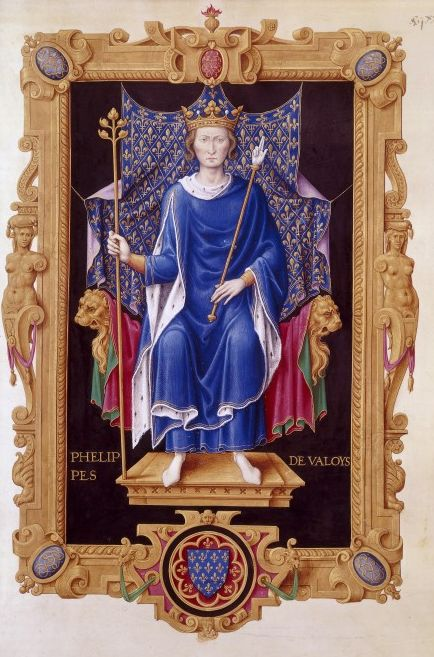
Miniature of Philip VI in Jean du Tillet's Recueil des rois de France, 16th century

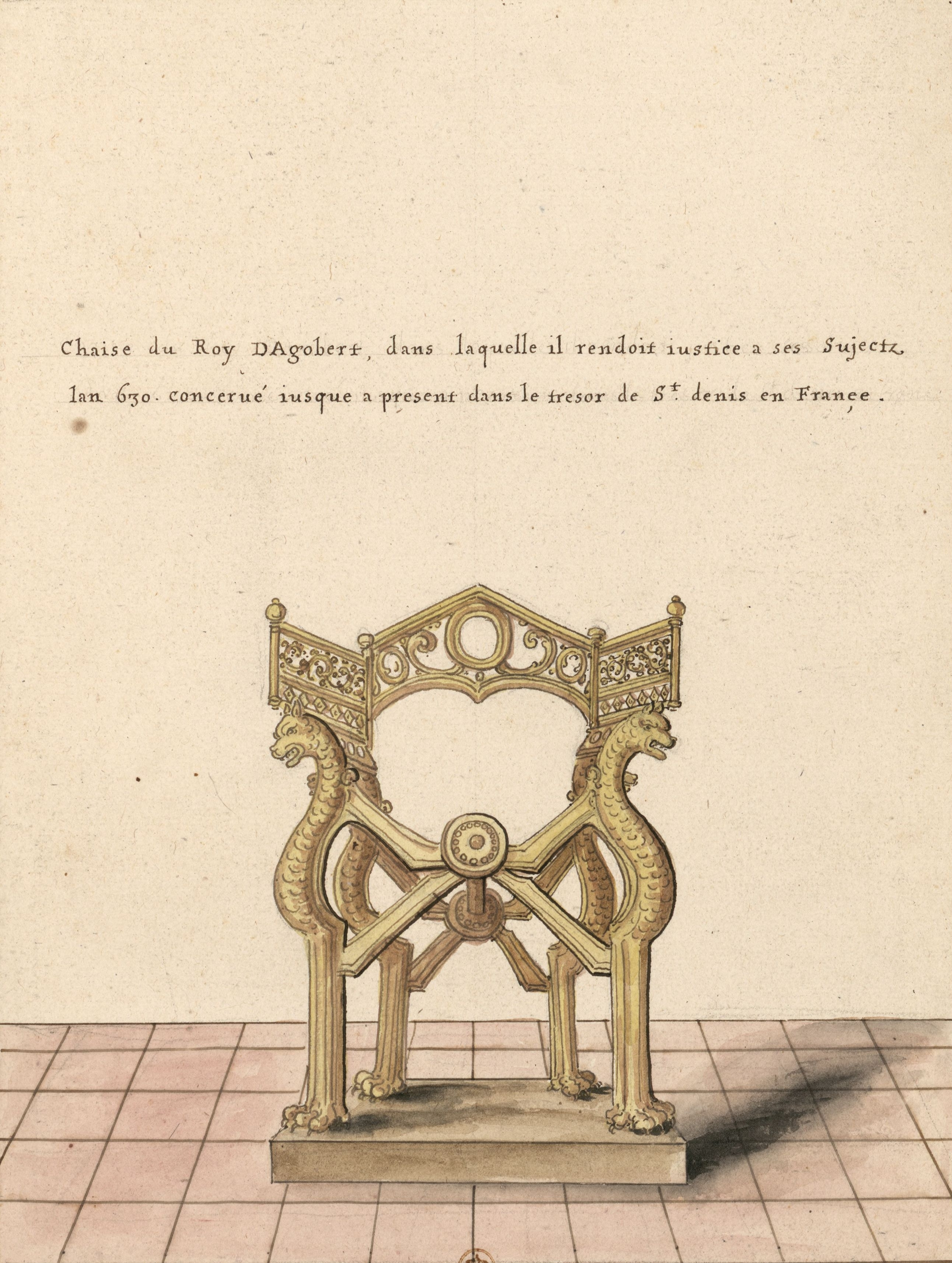
Watercolour of the throne by François Roger de Gaignières, 17th century

== See also ==
- Throne of Charlemagne
- Throne of Saint Peter
- Throne of Jahangir
- Peacock Throne
- Sun Throne
