= Gentian Hervetus =

French theologian and humanist (1499–1584)

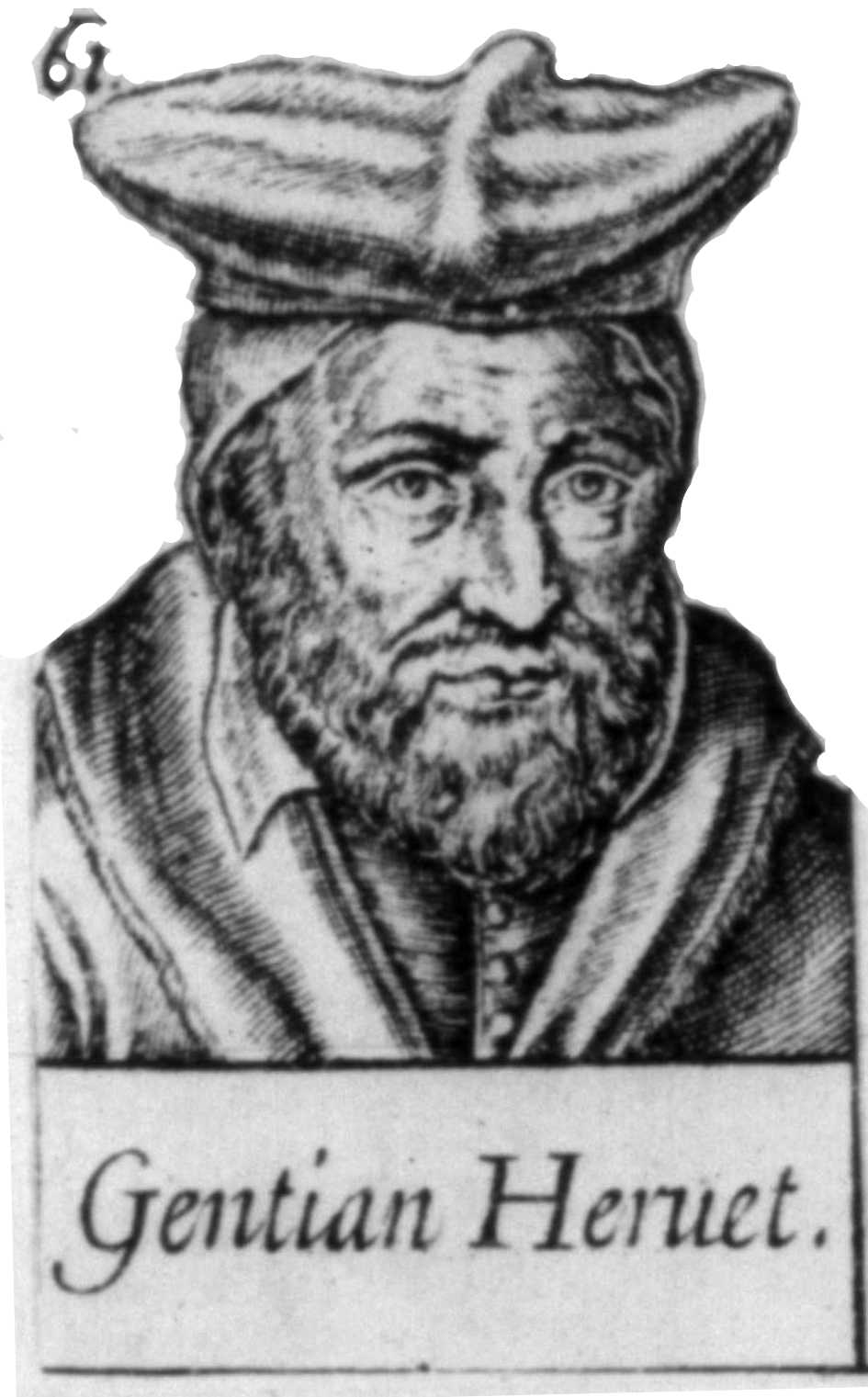

Gentian Hervetus (Hervet) (1499 at Olivet, near Orléans – 12 September 1584 at Reims) was a French Roman Catholic theologian, humanist and controversialist.

== Life ==
After studying the humanities at Orléans, he went to Paris, where he became tutor of Claude d'Aubespine, and afterwards, secretary of state. Here he became acquainted with Thomas Lupset, an Englishman, whom he later followed to England, where he was charged with the education of a brother of Cardinal Reginald Pole. He accompanied his scholar to Rome, where he remained some time in the house of Cardinal Pole, occupying himself chiefly with the Latin translation of various Greek Fathers (translations of Clement of Alexandria, John Chrysostom, Theodoret, Palladius of Helenopolis, Nicholas Cabasilas and apostolic canons). Apparently Hervet made use of and circulated a manuscript of Jean du Tillet containing Balsamon's commentaries on the canons

Returning to France, he taught the humanities for a short time at a college in Bordeaux, the College of Guienne, and then went back to Rome to become secretary to Cardinal Cervini, the future Pope Marcellus II. In 1546 he accompanied this cardinal to the Council of Trent, and delivered an oration against clandestine marriages.

In 1556, when he was already fifty-seven years old, he was ordained as a priest. Soon after, he became Vicar-General of the diocese of Noyon and received a canonry at Reims. As pastor he preached against the Calvinists and wrote numerous pamphlets against them. In 1562 he returned to the Council of Trent in the company of Cardinal Charles of Lorraine.

== Works ==
He is the author of "Le saint, universel et general concile de Trente" (Reims, 1564, Rouen, 1583; Paris, 1584), and numerous controversial pamphlets. He also translated into Latin and French many works of the Greek Fathers, collections of canons, decrees of councils, etc.

In 1555, Hervetus published a Latin translation of Theodoret's Historia religiosa and Palladius' Lausiac History. In 1569, he published another Latin translation, this one of the works of the Pyrrhonist philosopher Sextus Empiricus. In the preface, he wrote that in these works were the answer to the Calvinists.
