= Elie du Tillet =

French nobleman and administrator (died 1526)

Elie du Tillet, also known as Hélie du Tillet (died 1526), was a French nobleman and administrator.

He was ennobled by Charles VIII in 1484, and held an estate in Angoulême. Francis I made him vice president of the Chambre des Comptes in 1515.

du Tillet had eight children, including:

- His oldest son, Seraphin, held the post of greffier of the Parlement of Paris from 1519 to 1521
- His second son, Jean, took over the post of greffier and also became a historian
- His third son, Pierre, received a doctorate in law from the University of Poitiers in 1518
- His fourth son, Louis, was at one time a friend of John Calvin
- His fifth son, also called Jean, became bishop of Saint-Brieuc and Meaux
