= Berthoald, Duke of Saxony =

7th c proto-Frank nobleman

Berthoald (died 622) was the Duke of the Saxons during the reign of the Frankish kings Chlothar II and his son Dagobert I, the last ruling Merovingians. He despised Frankish suzerainty and rebelled, but was defeated. His story is told in the Liber Historiae Francorum (727) and the Gesta Dagoberti (830s), both sources partial to the Merovingian kings.

== Revolt and death ==
In 622, shortly after Chlothar had appointed Dagobert to rule Austrasia, the Frankish kingdom that bordered the Saxons, Berthoald rose in revolt and began marching against him. Dagobert crossed the Rhine and invaded Saxon territory to meet him. In the subsequent battle the Franks were defeated and Dagobert received a strong blow to his helmet, by which a portion of his characteristically long Merovingian hair was lost. He retrieved it and sent it with his armiger to his father, to request his assistance. Chlothar, who was in the Ardennes at the time, gathered an army on hearing the news and left that same night. The Franks under Dagobert then encamped on the river Weser across from Berthoald's army. When Chlothar arrived, Dagobert's Franks applauded so loudly that the Saxons could hear on the other side of the river. Berthoald, however, refused to believe reports that Chlothar had arrived and accused his men of cowardice. Chlothar waded his horse into the river, where the Saxon leader met him. After the king removed his helmet to reveal his long grey hair, Berthoald taunted the Frank: "Retire, for if you defeat me, people will only say you have beaten your slave Berthoald, while if I win the victory, they will say everywhere that the mighty king of the Franks has been killed by his slave." The king, in full armour, then charged him and killed him in single combat, even cutting off his head with his axe. The Saxons were routed in the battle that followed. Their land was plundered and a large number of their adult men were killed.

== Historical sources ==
The Saxon episode is described briefly in the tenth-century chronicle of Regino of Prüm, who characteristically gets the date wrong (572):

| Dagobertus filius Clotharii, cum Saxonibus dimicans, graviter ab eis vulneratur, patremque per legatum vocat in auxilium, qui festinus cum exercitu venit, et interfecto eorum duce Bertaldo, ita Saxones armis perdomuit, ut omnis virilis sexus ejusdem terrae incolas, qui gladii, quem tunc forte gerebat longitudinem excessissent perimeret. | While Dagobert, son of Clothar, was fighting with the Saxons, he was wounded gravely by them, and he called for help from his father, who quickly came with an army, and when the Saxon Duke Berthoald had been killed, Clothar conquered the Saxons with such force that he slaughtered all the inhabitants of the land of the male sex, who died along the length of the sword which he was then carrying. |

In 869, Hildegar, Bishop of Meaux, composed a Vita Faronis episcopi Meldensis in which he claims that a carmen publicum iuxta rusticitatem (a popular song) celebrating the Frankish victory over Berthoald was still being sung. He quotes the first and last lines only:

| De Chlothario est canere rege Francorum, Qui ivit pugnare in gentem Saxonum, Quam grave provenisset missis Saxonum, Si non fuisset inclinus Faro de gente Burgundionem ...... Quando veniunt missi Saxonum in terra Francorum, Faro ubi erat princeps, Instinctu Dei transeunt per urbem Meldorum, Ne interficiantur a rege Francorum. | There is a song about King Clothar of the Franks, who went to fight against the Saxons, what a burden would have come forth for the messengers of the Saxons, if Faro had not been struggling against the Burgundians ...... When the messengers of the Saxons came in the land of the Franks, where Faro was prince, with the instigation of God they passed through the city of Meaux, so that they would not be killed by the king of the Franks. |

== Notes ==
| Preceded by unknown; eventually Hadugato | Rulers of Saxony ? | Succeeded by Theoderic, Duke of Saxony |
