= Philippe de Vitry =

French composer, poet and music theorist (1291–1361)

Philippe de Vitry (31 October 1291 – 9 June 1361) was a French composer-poet, bishop and music theorist in the ars nova style of late medieval music. An accomplished, innovative, and influential composer, he was widely acknowledged as a leading musician of his day; the early Renaissance scholar Petrarch wrote a glowing tribute, calling him: "... the keenest and most ardent seeker of truth, so great a philosopher of our age." The important music treatise Ars nova notandi (1322) is usually attributed to Vitry.

It is thought that few of Vitry's compositions survive; though he wrote secular music, only his sacred works are extant.

== Life and career ==
Details of Philippe de Vitry's early life are vague. While some medieval sources claim that he was born in the Champagne region, modern researchers have found that he may have originated from Vitry-en-Artois near Arras.

Given that he is often referred to in documents as a Magister, Vitry is thought likely to have studied at the University of Paris. Later he was prominent in the courts of Charles IV, Philippe VI and Jean II, serving as a secretary and advisor. Perhaps aided by these Bourbon connections, he also held several canonries, including Clermont, Beauvais and Paris, also serving for a time in the papal retinue at Avignon starting with Clement VI. In addition to all this, he was a diplomat and a soldier, known to have served at the siege of Aiguillon in 1346.

In 1351 Vitry became Bishop of Meaux, east of Paris. Moving in all the most important political, artistic and ecclesiastical circles, he was acquainted with many lights of the age, including the Italian scholar Petrarch and the mathematician, philosopher and music theorist Nicole Oresme. Vitry died in Paris on 9 June 1361.

== Music ==
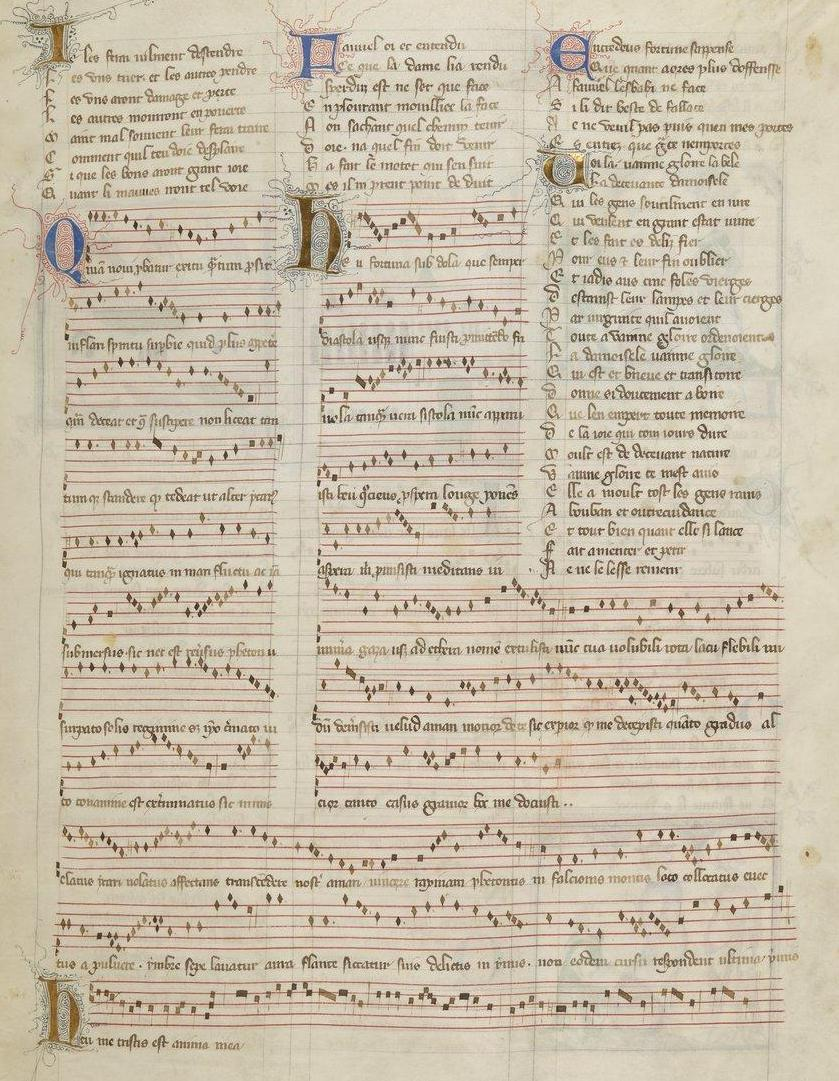
Heu Fortuna, (Bibliothèque nationale de France)

Manuscript of Vitry's Aman novi/Heu Fortuna/Heu me, tristis est anima mea from F-Pnm Français 146, a version of the Roman de Fauvel.

Vitry is most famous in music history for the treatise on music Ars nova notandi (1322), that lent its name to the music of the era. His authorship—and the very existence of—the treatise have come into question.

A few of Vitry's compositions have survived. They show the innovations in musical notation, particularly mensural and rhythmic, with which he was credited within a century of their inception. Such innovations as are exemplified in his stylistically-attributed motets for the Roman de Fauvel were particularly important; they made possible the free and complex music of the next 100 years, which culminated in the Ars subtilior.

Vitry is reputed to have written chansons, but only some of his motets have survived. Each is strikingly individual, exploiting a unique structural idea. He is also often credited with developing the concept of isorhythmic lines. (Note: An isorhythmic line consists of repeating patterns of rhythms and pitches, but the patterns overlap rather than correspond; e.g., a line of 30 consecutive notes might contain five repetitions of a six-note melody or six repetitions of a five-note rhythm.) Five of his three-part motets have survived in the Roman de Fauvel; an additional nine can be found in the Ivrea Codex.

== Works ==
While there is still debate about what Vitry did and did not compose, the first 16 works here, all motets, are widely considered to be his. Few of Vitry's compositions survive. He wrote secular music, but only his sacred works are extant.

Attributed on strong historical evidence

1. Aman novi / Heu Fortuna / Heu me, tristis est anima mea
2. Cum statua / Hugo / Magister invidie
3. Douce playsence / Garison / Neuma quinti toni
4. Floret / Florens / Neuma
5. Garrit gallus / In nova fert / Neuma
6. Impudenter circuivi / Virtutibus / Contratenor / Tenor
7. O canenda / Rex quem / Contratenor / Rex regum
8. Petre clemens / Lugentium / Tenor
9. Tribum / Quoniam secta / Merito hec patimur
10. Tuba sacre fidei / In arboris / Virgo sum
11. Vos quid admiramini / Gratissima / Contratenor / Gaude gloriosa

Note: The motet Phi millies / O creator / Iacet granum / Quam sufflabit and the ballade De terre en grec Gaulle appellee are securely attributed to Vitry, but no music for the latter survives, whilst the former survives only fragmentarily (see Zayaruznaya, 2018).

Attributed on a combination of weaker historical evidence and stylistic grounds

1. Colla iugo / Bona condit / Libera me Domine
2. Firmissime / Adesto / Alleluya, Benedictus
3. Flos ortus / Celsa cedrus / Tenor
4. Orbis orbatus / Vos pastores / Fur non venit (less widely accepted)
5. Quid scire proderit / Dantur officia (less widely accepted)

Attributed on stylistic grounds alone (not widely accepted)

1. Almifonis / Rosa / Tenor
2. Amer / Durement / Dolor meus
3. Apta caro / Flos / Alma redemptorisa mater
4. In virtute / Decens carmen / Clamor meus / Contratenor
5. O Philippe / O bone
6. Per grama protho paret
7. Scariotis / Jure
8. Se cuers / Rex
9. Se paour / Diex / Concupisco
10. Servant regem / O Philippe / Rex regum

== Recordings ==
2009 – En un gardin. Les quatre saisons de l'Ars Nova. Manuscrits de Stavelot, Mons, Utrecht, Leiden. Capilla Flamenca. MEW 0852. Contains recordings of "Vos quid admiramini virginem / Gratissima virginis / Gaude gloriosa" and "Adesto sancta trinitas / Firmissime fidem / Alleluia Benedicta" by Philippe de Vitry.

== Sources ==
- Bent, Margaret (2018) [2001]. "Vitry, Philippe de". Grove Music Online. Revised by Andrew Wathey. Oxford: Oxford University Press. doi:10.1093/gmo/9781561592630.article.29535. ISBN 978-1-56159-2-630.
- Robertson, Anne Walters (1998). "Which Vitry? The Witness of the Trinity Motet from the Roman de Fauvel"". In Pesce, Dolores (ed.). Hearing the Motet: Essays on the Motet of the Middle Ages and Renaissance. New York; Oxford: Oxford University Press. ISBN 978-01953-5-165-1.
- Sanders, Ernest H. "Philippe de Vitry". The New Grove Dictionary of Music and Musicians, ed. Stanley Sadie. 20 vol. London, Macmillan Publishers Ltd., 1980. ISBN 1-56159-174-2
- Wilkins, Nigel (2001). "Chanson". Grove Music Online. Revised by David Fallows, Howard Mayer Brown and Richard Freedman. Oxford: Oxford University Press. doi:10.1093/gmo/9781561592630.article.40032. ISBN 978-1-56159-263-0. (subscription, Wikilibrary access, or UK public library membership required)

Catholic Church titles
Preceded by Jean de Meulan	Bishop of Meaux; 1351–1361	Succeeded by Jean Royer
