= Lothar Psalter =

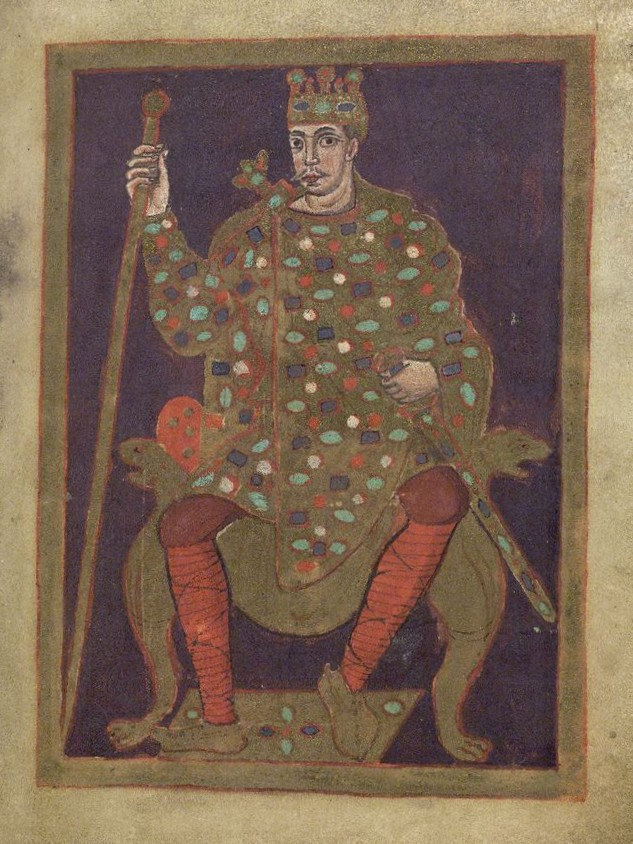
Lothar depicted in his psalter with sceptre, sword and bejewelled cloak. He is sitting in a curule chair, which might be the earliest surviving depiction of the so-called Throne of Dagobert.

The Lothar Psalter (shelfmark London, British Library, Add MS 37768) is an illuminated manuscript of the Psalms in Latin.

The Lothar Psalter is a parchment codex that measures 230 by 190 millimetres (9.1 in × 7.5 in). It contains 179 leaves, 172 of them numbered. It was produced between 842 and 855 for the Emperor Lothar I. It belongs to the Lothar palace school (Hofschule) group of manuscripts or Lothar-Gruppe. It is in fact the only one of the group that is indisputably connected to Lothar. The group is traditionally believes to have been produced at the Palace of Aachen, although the psalter was possibly made at the Abbey of Saint Martin's in Tours. Its binding is ninth-century. The front cover contains a silver-gilt medallion depicting Lothar.

The first text is a prayer composed by one of Lothar's sisters or daughters. It is written in red and gold inks. It has the heading Confessio optima peccatoris ('best confession for a sinner'). Another prayer follows under the heading 'a prayer before the beginning of the psalter'. This is followed by dedicatory poem to Lothar written in gold rustic capitals, opposite a full-page illustration of Lothar. It refers to a Byzantine embassy received by Lothar in August 842, which represents the terminus post quem or earliest possible date of composition. Lothar's portrait and poem are followed by full-page illustrations of King David and Saint Jerome. They are also accompanied by poems. The poem to David, the primary composer of the Psalms, compares him to Lothar as one raised above his brothers. The poem to Jerome praises his translation and correction of the Psalms. It is followed by Jerome's prologue to the Psalms.

The text of the psalter is entirely in gold. The main text is Caroline minuscule, but uncial and rustic capitals are used for headings. Initials are decorated in red, green and gold. Decorated full-page initials in the Franco-Saxon style appear every ten psalms.

The Lothar Psalter was originally owned by the family of Lothar, but it had passed to the Abbey of Saint-Hubert by the eleventh century. It is unclear how it came to England. It was bequeathed to the British Library by Sir Thomas Brooke in 1908.

== Gallery ==
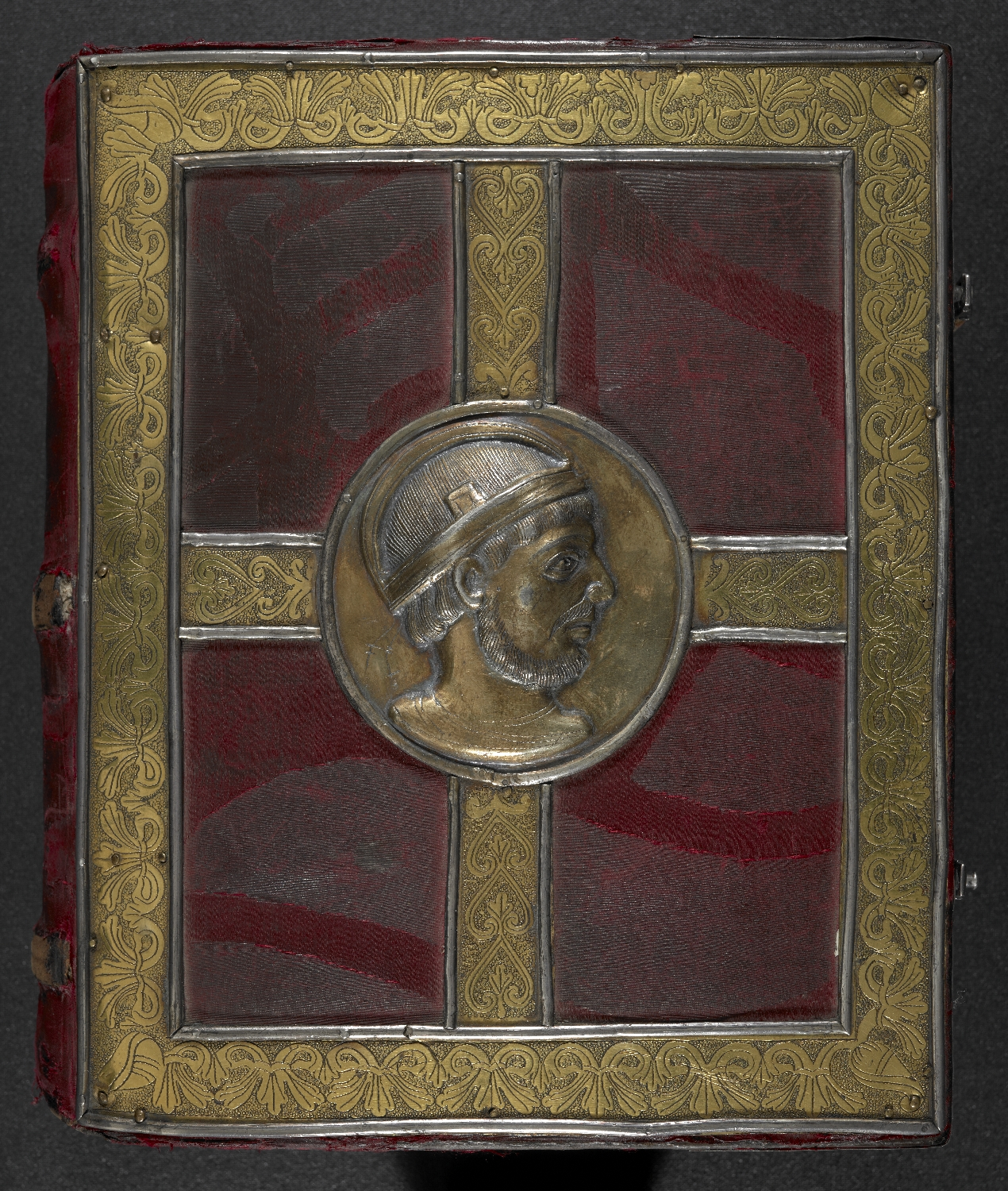
Front cover

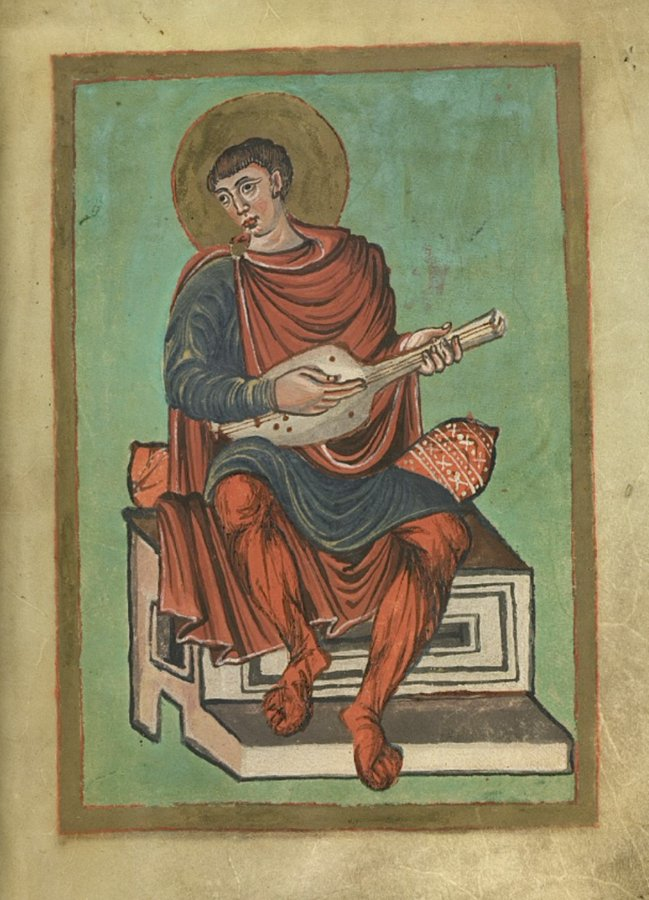
King David

Start of Psalm 41 (42)

== Bibliography ==
- Hirsh, John C. (2021). "Private Prayer in the Ninth Century: Testimony from the Lothar Psalter". The Heythrop Journal. 62 (5): 816–822. doi:10.1111/heyj.13801.
- Lasko, Peter (1994). Ars Sacra, 800–1200 (2nd ed.). Yale University Press.
- McKitterick, Rosamond (1990). "Carolingian Uncial: A Context for the Lothar Psalter". The British Library Journal. 16 (1): 1–15.
- Nees, Lawrence (2022). Frankish Manuscripts: The Seventh to the Tenth Century. Harvey Miller.
- Pani, Laura (2022). "Lothar's Manuscripts, Manuscripts for Lothar, Manuscripts of Lothar's Time". In Gianmarco De Angelis; Francesco Veronese (eds.). Networks of Bishops, Networks of Texts: Manuscripts, Legal Cultures, Tools of Government in Carolingian Italy at the Time of Lothar I. Firenze University Press. pp. 13–31.
- Screen, Elina (2004). "The Importance of the Emperor: Lothar I and the Frankish Civil War, 840–843". Early Medieval Europe. 12 (1): 25–51. doi:10.1111/j.0963-9462.2003.00120.x.
- Westwell, Chantry (2013). "An Imperial Psalter". Medieval Manuscripts Blog. British Library.
