= Charles II, Duke of Orléans =

Charles II de Valois
- Duke of Orléans
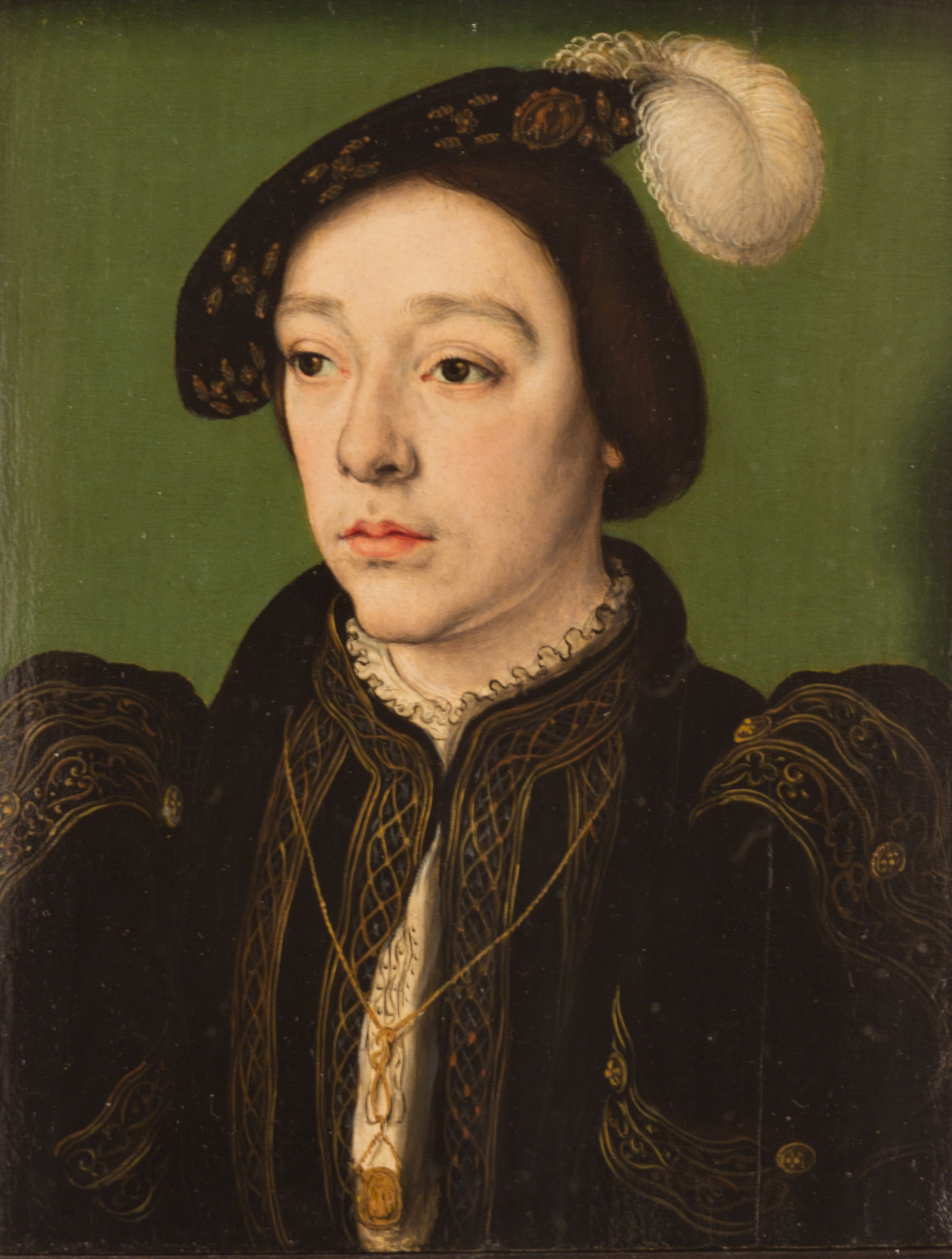
- Portrait by Corneille de Lyon, 1536
- Born: Charles, Duke of Angoulême; 22 January 1522
- Died: 9 September 1545 (aged 23)
- House: Valois-Angoulême
- Father: Francis I of France
- Mother: Claude of France

Charles II of Orléans (22 January 1522 – 9 September 1545) was the third son of Francis I and Claude of France. In the autumn of 1545, Charles was on his way to Boulogne, which was under siege. On 6 September, he came across a cluster of houses that had been emptied and sealed off "from the plague", probably a form of influenza. In the belief that the sons of the King of France were immune to plagues, Charles and one of his brothers entered some of the infected houses. After supposedly lying down on one of the infected beds and rolling around on the bedding, he took ill on the evening of the same day. Charles died on 9 September. During his funeral, the future King Henry II wept for Charles even though his friend, François de Scépeaux, argued that Charles "never loved or esteemed you."

== Duke of Orléans ==
Drawing by unknown artist

From his birth until the death of his oldest brother Francis, Dauphin of France (Francis I's eldest son), in 1536, Charles was known as the Duke of Angoulême. After his brother's death, he became Duke of Orléans, a title previously held by his surviving brother Henry, who had succeeded Francis as Dauphin and would later become King of France as Henry II.

By all accounts, he was the most handsome of Francis I's sons. Smallpox made him blind in one eye, but it seems that it was not noticeable. He was known for his wild antics, his practical jokes and his extravagance and frivolousness, which his father approved of wholeheartedly. He was, by far, his father's favorite son. In addition, he was popular with everyone at his father's court, and it was widely believed that the French nobility of the time would have much preferred to have him as the Dauphin as opposed to his downcast brother, Henry, who never seemed to recover from his years of captivity in Spain.

In 1540 he was granted the title of Count of Clermont.

In 1542, Francis I and Charles V, Holy Roman Emperor, again went to war against each other. Charles fought and captured Luxembourg, but then fearful that he would miss the glory of Perpignan, which was under siege by the Dauphin Henry, he headed south. Luxembourg was lost and retaken several times during the war.

== Marriage arrangements ==
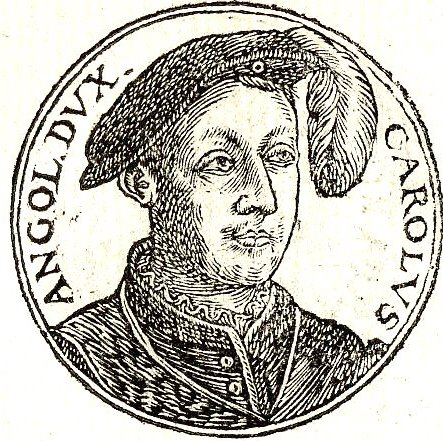
Charles II from Guillaume Rouillé's Promptuarii Iconum Insigniorum

In January 1535, Henry VIII offered a betrothal between the 1-year-old Princess Elizabeth and the 12-year-old Charles, then the Duke of Angoulême, on the condition that Francis I would persuade Pope Paul to reverse Pope Clement's ruling on his marriage to Anne Boleyn as illegitimate. However, Francis was reluctant to recognize Henry's marriage to Anne because that would force him to question the Pope's ruling. More importantly, Francis was worried about Elizabeth's legitimacy despite Henry's assurance that she was his heiress presumptive. Francis stated that he would agree to the match only if Henry would agree to discontinue the annual pensions that Francis paid to England under the Terms of the Treaty of Amiens as part of Elizabeth's dowry. Henry was offended, and he stated that he had been generous in offering an heiress "of most certain title, without remainder of querel to the contrary" to a younger son. English and French commissioners met at Calais to discuss the terms of the marriage treaty, but they failed to reach a consensus because Henry insisted that Charles come to England until his marriage. Francis refused to send his son to be a hostage to England. By July, the marriage negotiations came to a halt. In May 1536, Anne Boleyn was executed, and Elizabeth was declared illegitimate, permanently ending any prospects of a marriage to Charles.

On 19 September 1544, the Treaty of Crépy was signed. Charles had a choice to marry one either Charles V's daughter or paternal niece. Infanta Maria of Spain was the daughter of Emperor Charles V and Isabella of Portugal, and she would bring the Netherlands or the Low Countries of Franche-Comté as her dowry. Archduchess Anna of Austria was the daughter of Ferdinand I, King of Hungary and Bohemia and Anna of Bohemia and Hungary, and she would bring Milan as her dowry. As the groom's father, Francis I agreed to endow Charles with Angoulême, Châtellerault, Bourbon and Orléans.

The Peace of Crépy deeply offended Charles' elder brother, the Dauphin Henry, and his wife, Catherine de' Medici. As the heir of Valentina Visconti, Henry considered Milan to be his birthright. More importantly, this settlement would make his brother Charles as powerful as a monarch and link him by marriage to Emperor Charles V, which would divide French interests and create a strategic nightmare. Many historians believe that Charles V hoped to use Charles as an adversary against Henry. Henry wrote a secret denunciation of the pact because it gave away three inalienable Crown properties.

== Death ==
The rivalry between Charles and his brother, the Dauphin Henry, was potentially dangerous. However, it resolved itself with the death of Charles. In the autumn of 1545, Charles was on his way (with his brother, the Dauphin) to Boulogne, which was under siege. On 6 September, they came across a cluster of houses that had been emptied and sealed off "from the plague"—probably a form of influenza. Stating that "no son of a King of France ever died of plague", Charles entered some of the infected houses with his brother. Laughing, he slashed at bedding with his sword and started a pillow fight with some of his traveling companions. Stories have also been told of him (on a dare) lying down on one of the infected beds and rolling around on the bedding. Later that evening, after dining with his father and brother, he took suddenly ill, suffering from pain, a high fever, vomiting and shaking limbs. Dauphin Henry rushed to his sickroom immediately, but was barred from entering, being physically restrained on several occasions.

Charles died on 9 September 1545. Some thought that he had been poisoned, but most agreed that it was the "plague" that killed him. He is buried next to his father, Francis I and his brother, the Dauphin Francis at the Abbey of Saint-Denis. During his funeral, the future King Henry II wept for Charles even though his friend, François de Scépeaux, argued that Charles "never loved or esteemed you."

At the time of his death, he possessed the Duchies of Angoulême, Bourbon, and Châtellerault.

== Sources ==
- Seward, Desmond (1973). Prince of the Renaissance: The Golden Life of François I. New York: Macmillan Publishing Co. ISBN 9780026097000.
- Baumgartner, Frederic J (1988). Henry II, King of France, 1547–1559. Duke University Press. ISBN 9780822307952.
- Plowden, Alison (2011). Marriage With My Kingdom. The History Press. ISBN 9780752467412.
- Frieda, Leonie (2003). Catherine de Medici: Renaissance Queen of France. HarperCollins. ISBN 9781842127254.
- Williams, H. Noel (1910). Henry II: His Court and Times. ISBN 9785518683754.
