= Ancient Diocese of Noyon =

Roman Catholic diocese in France (c. 531 - 1851)

Coordinates: 49.58°N 3.00°E

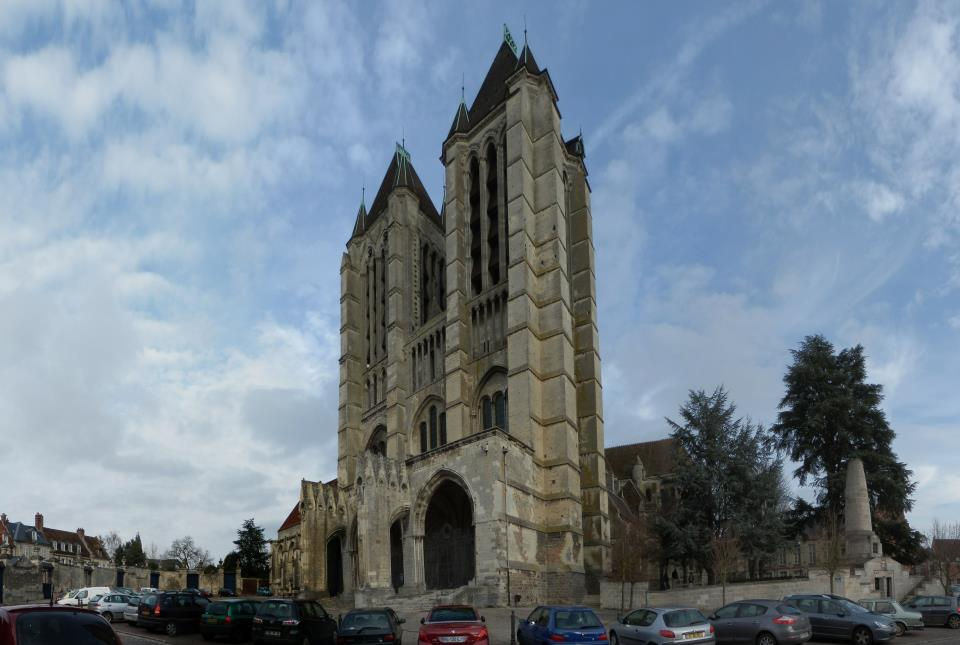
Noyon Cathedral

The former French Catholic Diocese of Noyon lay in the north-east of France, around Noyon. It was formed when Saint Medardus moved the seat of the bishopric at Vermandois to Noyon, in the sixth century. From 545 to 1146, it was united with the bishopric of Tournai as the Diocese of Noyon–Tournai. Then in the twelfth century it was again independent, and the bishop of Noyon became a pairie-comté of France.

The diocese of Noyon was brought to an end by the French Revolution. Its territory passed to the diocese of Beauvais.

== List of bishops ==
=== Early bishops ===
- Faustin
- Gondulph
- Evroul
- Bertimond
- c. 531–545 : Medardus

=== Unified with Tournai ===
- 540 : Eleutherius of Tournai (Eleuthere)
- c. 549 and 552 : Agrecius
- 545 : Medardus
- Then jointly with Noyon
- c. 626–c. 638 : Acarius
- 642–660: Saint Eligius
- 660–686: Saint Mommolin
- Gondoin
- c. 700 : Antgaire
- c. 715 : Chrasmar
- c. 721 : Garoul
- c. 723 : Framenger
- c. 730 : Hunuan
- c. 740 : Gui et Eunuce
- c. 748 : Elisée
- c. 756/765 : Adelfred
- ? : Didon
- 769–c. 782 : Giselbert
- c. 798/799 : Pleon
- c. 815 : Wendelmarus
- c. 830/838 : Ronegaire
- c. 830/838 : Fichard
- 841–859 : Immo
- 860–879 : Rainelme
- 880–902 : Heidilon
- 909 : Rambert
- 915–932 : Airard
- †936 : Walbert
- 937–950 : Transmar, Transmarus
- 950–954 : Rudolf
- 954–955 : Fulcher
- 955–977 : Hadulphe
- 977–988 : Liudolf of Vermandois
- 989–997 : Radbod I
- 1000–1030 : Hardouin
- 1030–1044 : Hugo
- 1044–1068 : Balduin
- 1068–1098 : Radbod II
- 1099–1112 : Baldric of Noyon
- 1114–1123 : Lambert
- 1123–1146 : Simon of Vermandois

=== Independent again ===
- 1146–1148 : Simon of Vermandois
- 1148–1167 : Baldwin II of Boulogne
- 1167–1174 or 1175 : Baldwin III de Beuseberg
- 1175–1188 : Renaud
- 1188–1221 : Stephan of Nemours
- 1222–1228 : Gérard de Bazoches
- 1228–1240 : Nicolas de Roye
- 1240–1249 : Pierre I Charlot
- 1250–1272 : Vermond de La Boissière
- 1272–1297 : Guy II des Prés (Prez)
- 1297–1301 : Simon II of Clermont-Nesle, son of Simon II of Clermont, Seigneur of Nesle
- 1301–1303 : Peire de Ferrières (also bishop of Arles)
- 1304–1315 : André Le Moine de Crécy
- 1315–1317 : Florent de La Boissière
- 1317–1331 : Foucaud de Rochechouart (also bishop of Bourges)
- 1331–1338 : Guillaume Bertrand (also bishop of Bayeux)
- 1338–1339 : Étienne Aubert
- 1339–1342 : Pierre D'André (also bishop of Clermont)
- 1342–1347 : Bernard Brion (or Le Brun) (also bishop of Auxerre)
- 1347–1349 :Guy de Comborn
- 1349–1350 : Firmin Coquerel
- 1350–1351 : Philippe D'Arbois (also bishop of Tournai)
- 1351–1352 : Jean de Meulan (also bishop of Paris)
- 1352–1388 : Gilles de Lorris
- 1388–1409 : Philippe de Moulins (also bishop of Évreux)
- 1409–1415 : Pierre Fresnel (also bishop of Meaux and Lisieux)
- 1415–1424 : Raoul de Coucy
- 1425–1473 : Jean de Mailly
- 1473–1501 : Guillaume Marafin
- 1501–1525 : Charles de Hangest
- 1525–1577 : Jean de Hangest
- 1577–1588 : Claude D'Angennes de Rambouillet
- 1588–1590 or 1593 : Gabriel Le Genevois de Bleigny (Blaigny)
- 1590–1594 : Jean Meusnier (Munier)
- 1594–1596 : François-Annibal D'Estrées
- 1596–1625 : Charles de Balsac (Balzac)
- 1625 : Gilles de Lourmé
- 1626–1660 : Henri de Baradat
- 1661–1701 : François de Clermont-Tonnerre
- 1701–1707 : Claude-Maur D'Aubigné (also archbishop of Rouen)
- 1707–1731 : Charles-François de Châteauneuf de Rochebonne
- 1731–1733 : Claude de Rouvroy de Saint-Simon
- 1734–1766 : Jean-François de La Cropte de Bourzac
- 1766–1777 : Charles de Broglie
- 1778–1808 : Louis-André de Grimaldi

== See also ==
- Catholic Church in France
- List of Catholic dioceses in France

== Bibliography ==
=== Reference works ===
- Gams, Pius Bonifatius (1873). Series episcoporum Ecclesiae catholicae: quotquot innotuerunt a beato Petro apostolo. Ratisbon: Typis et Sumptibus Georgii Josephi Manz. (Use with caution; obsolete)
- Eubel, Conradus, ed. (1913). Hierarchia catholica, Tomus 1 (second ed.). Münster: Libreria Regensbergiana. (in Latin)
- Eubel, Conradus, ed. (1914). Hierarchia catholica, Tomus 2 (second ed.). Münster: Libreria Regensbergiana. (in Latin)
- Gulik, Guilelmus (1923). Eubel, Conradus (ed.). Hierarchia catholica, Tomus 3 (second ed.). Münster: Libreria Regensbergiana.
- Gauchat, Patritius (Patrice) (1935). Hierarchia catholica IV (1592-1667). Münster: Libraria Regensbergiana.
- Ritzler, Remigius; Sefrin, Pirminus (1952). Hierarchia catholica medii et recentis aevi V (1667-1730). Patavii: Messagero di S. Antonio.
- Ritzler, Remigius; Sefrin, Pirminus (1958). Hierarchia catholica medii et recentis aevi VI (1730-1799). Patavii: Messagero di S. Antonio.

=== Studies ===
- Duchesne, Louis (1910). Fastes épiscopaux de l'ancienne Gaule: II. L'Aquitaine et les Lyonnaises. Paris: Fontemoing.
- Du Tems, Hugues (1774). Le clergé de France, ou tableau historique et chronologique des archevêques, évêques, abbés, abbesses et chefs des chapitres principaux du royaume, depuis la fondation des églises jusqu'à nos jours (in French). Vol. Tome premier. Paris: Delalain.
- Jean, Armand (1891). Les évêques et les archevêques de France depuis 1682 jusqu'à 1801 (in French). Paris: A. Picard. p. 78.
