= Guillaume Bertrand =

French prelate

Guillaume Bertrand (died 19 May 1356) was a French prelate of the 14th century.

== Biography ==
Coming from the Bertrand family, he was the son of Robert VI Bertrand de Bricquebec, Baron de Bricquebec, and Ide de Clermont-Nesle, and the brother of Marshal Robert VII Bertrand de Bricquebec.

Guillaume Bertrand was canon at Beaune and bishop of Noyon from 1331 to 1338, then bishop of Bayeux (1338-1347) and bishop of Beauvais (1347-1356).

In 1346 he defended the Chateau de Caen, where the king established him commander when the king of England besieged it.
