= Jean de Meulan =

Bishop of Meaux from 1335 to 1351

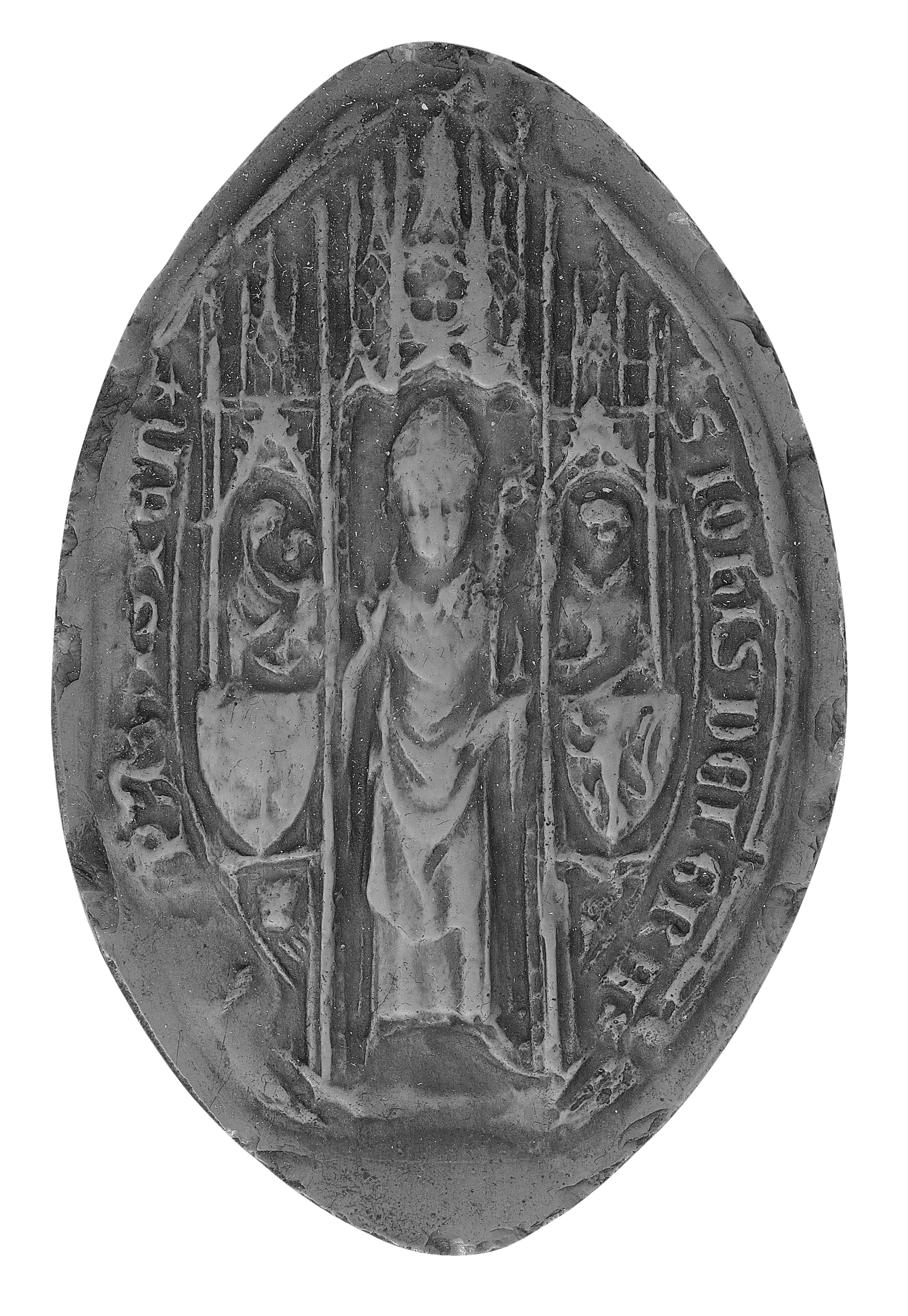
- Jean's sigil

Personal details
- Born: c. 1283
- Died: 1363
- Parents: Galéran de Meulan; Johanna de Bouville

Bishop of Meaux
- In office 1334–1351
- Preceded by: Durandus of Saint-Pourçain
- Succeeded by: Philippe de Vitry

Bishop of Noyon
- In office 1351–1352
- Preceded by: Philippe D'Arbois
- Succeeded by: Gilles de Lorris

Bishop of Paris
- In office 1352–1363
- Preceded by: Pierre de la Forest
- Succeeded by: Etienne de Poissy

Jean de Meulan (c. 1283–1363) was Bishop of Meaux from 1335 to 1351, Bishop of Noyon from 1351 to 1352, and Bishop of Paris from 1352 until his death.

== Life ==
De Meulan was born roughly in 1283 in Saint-Quentin, the son of Galéran de Meulan, lord of Neubourg and Johanna de Bouville, lady of Milly.

He was archdeacon of Brie and treasurer of Sainte-Chapelle in Paris before being elected bishop of Meaux in 1335. In 1340, he participated in the Battle of Saint-Omer. Being the heir of his brother, Guillaume de Meulan, he inherited from him the lordship of Neubourg. However, he also entered into dispute at the senate of Paris with his widow, Isabelle de Trie in 1343 and 1344.

In 1351, Jean was transferred to Noyon, becoming its bishop.

In 1352 he became bishop of Paris. In 1362, he donated the lordship of Neubourg to his nephew, Jean de la Ferté. In 1363, he entered into a dispute with the prefect of Paris on the rights of the bishop.

Jean died on November 22, 1363 from the plague.

Catholic Church titles
Preceded by Durandus of Saint-Pourçain	Bishop of Meaux; 1334 - 1351	Succeeded by Philippe de Vitry
Preceded by Philippe D'Arbois	Bishop of Noyon; 1351 - 1352	Succeeded by Gilles de Lorris
Preceded by Pierre de la Forest	Bishop of Paris; 1352 - 1363	Succeeded by Etienne de Poissy
