= Simon of Vermandois =

French nobleman and bishop (1093-1148)

Simon of Vermandois (1093–1148) was a French nobleman and bishop.

He was a son of Hugh I of Vermandois. Elected bishop of Noyon in 1123, he was excommunicated in 1142 by Pope Innocent II, for divorcing his brother Raoul I, Count of Vermandois from Eléonore of Blois. He subsequently went on the Second Crusade with Louis VII of France, dying on the return journey in Seleucia.

He was buried at Ourscamp Abbey, which he had founded in 1129, inviting monks from Clairvaux Abbey under Waleran de Baudemont.
