= Jean du Tillet, sieur de La Bussière =

French nobleman, archivist and historian

Jean du Tillet (died 2 October 1570) was a French nobleman, archivist and historian.

== Life ==
The du Tillet family was of the Gallican persuasion and held the lordship of La Bussière. Jean du Tillet was born in the early 16th century and inherited the lordship and the title sieur from his father, Elie du Tillet. He also took over the hereditary office of greffier civil (civil clerk) of the Parlement of Paris after his father retired in 1521. One of his brothers, Séraphin, disputed his right to the office of greffier in 1526. His younger brother Louis sheltered John Calvin in 1534 and was for a time Calvin's companion abroad, until Jean persuaded him to come home in 1538. He had another younger brother, also named Jean du Tillet, who later became bishop of Meaux. The two Jeans du Tillet were Renaissance humanists and frequent collaborators. The elder Jean was primarily an archivist interested in documents, while the younger Jean was more interested in manuscript collecting.

Jean du Tillet was an ardent Gallican. During the Gallican crisis of 1551, he was one of those who advised King Henry II to follow the example of Henry VIII of England and establish an independent French church. It was at his instigation, according to Jacques-Auguste de Thou, that Henry II forbade the export of gold to Rome. Jean du Tillet also began compiling a dossier meant to justify a break with Rome if such occurred, but Henry II reconciled with the papacy in 1552. Following Henry's death in 1559, and in spite of the support of Anne de Montmorency, du Tillet was forbidden to publish his findings by Charles, Cardinal of Lorraine. Instead, he was paid to write against the Amboise conspirators, led by his personal enemy, Jean du Barry.

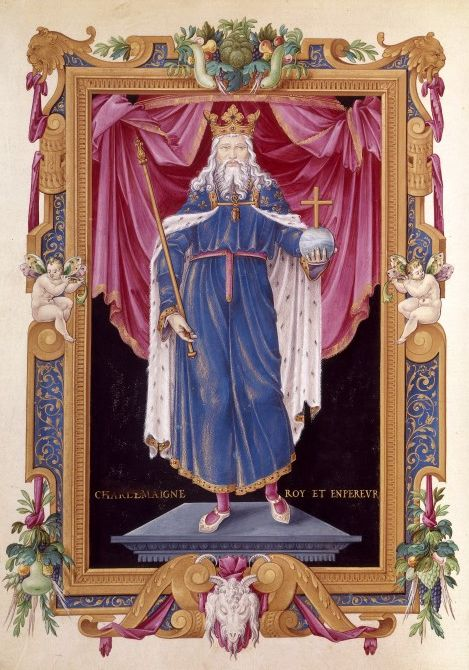
Charlemagne, from an illustrated copy of du Tillet's Recueil des rois

Although Francis II ordered du Tillet to bring organization to the royal archives, he seems to have been too busy using them to have advanced far in that task. He died just six weeks before his brother the bishop.

== Works ==
In 1560, du Tillet wrote two tracts defending the claim that Francis II had attained his majority, which were published over du Tillet's objections. In these short works—Pour la majorité du roi treschrestien contre les escrits des rebelles and Pour l'entiere majorité du roi treschrestien contre le legitime conseil malicieusement inventé par les rebelles—he argued that Roman law did not control the French monarchy, which was based on customary law. Citing sources as far back as Tacitus' Germania, he showed that fifteen was the age of majority for monarchs.

Between 1562 and 1569, du Tillet wrote at least eight tracts on religious subjects against the backdrop of the French Wars of Religion. He staunchly defended Catholicism against Protestantism. Two of these tracts were published in his lifetime, one dedicated to Queen Catherine de' Medici appeared in print two decades after his death and the remaining five (including two dedicated to King Charles IX) went unpublished until 1994.

Jean du Tillet's most famous work is Recueil des rois de France, which was first published posthumously by his nephew in 1577, having first been suppressed by the cardinal of Lorraine. It went through many editions, the most complete being that of 1607. It also survives in many manuscripts.

Jean du Tillet was one of the first scholars to reject the theory of Trojan origin of the Franks in favour of a purely Germanic origin. Leon Poliakov quoted du Tillet in The Aryan Myth:

Those who described the French as being truly of German origin did them more honour than those who believed they were descended from the Trojans, since honour is due only to virtue. For no nation has suffered so little corruption of its morality, nor striven so mightily and for so long to maintain its freedom by arms, as the German nation.

Du Tillet argued that "Charlemagne belongs more to France than to Germany", and tried to show that the king of France was as much an emperor in fact as the Holy Roman Emperor. He traced the fief back to the Lombards and showed that it was not hereditary before the Capetians. On the whole, he sought to divorce French history from classical history and depict France as totally independent of Roman law and the Roman Empire.

He was familiar with the writings of Pierre Dubois.
