= Transmar =

Transmar was a 10th-century bishop of Tournai and Noyon. Before his appointment to the dual see in 937, he was a monk in the Abbey of Saint-Vaast in Arras and served as provost of his monastery. Both the Abbey of St Peter in Ghent and the chapter of Noyon benefited from his support. He died on 21 March 950 and was buried in the choir of Noyon Cathedral.
