= Hildegar (bishop of Meaux) =

Hildegar, or in French Hildegaire (died 873/76), was the bishop of Meaux from around 856 until his death.

In January 862, a band of Vikings under the son of Weland left their encampment at the abbey of Fossés and "with a few ships" looted the city of Meaux up the river. Shortly after the attack, Hildegar composed the Vita et miracula sancti Faronis episcopi Meldensis, a biography of Saint Faro, his seventh-century predecessor, whose intervention Hildegar credited with saving the church of Meaux from destruction. Hildegar blamed the Viking attacks on the king, Charles, and on "treachery" (infidelitas), a veiled accusation that Charles had allowed the Vikings to attack because his son, Louis the Stammerer, was in rebellion and staying at Meaux at the time. He was probably supported by Hildegar. In the settlement between father and son, Louis was granted the county of Meaux. Hildegar also called the Seine valley the "paradise of the realm".

Hildegar also records that the Franks were still singing the Farolied, a rustic song about the victory of King Chlothar II over Duke Berthoald of Saxony in 622. Bruno Krusch was of the opinion that Hildegar himself was the author of the Farolied.

== Sources ==
- Diesenberger, Max (2003). "Hair, Sacrality and Symbolic Capital in the Frankish Kingdoms". In Corradini, Richard; Diesenberger, Max; Reimitz, Helmut (eds.). The Construction of Communities in the Early Middle Ages: Texts, Resources and Artefacts. Leiden: Brill.
- Nelson, J. L. (1992). Charles the Bald. London: Longman.
