= Libri Carolini =

Four books on the command of Charlemagne

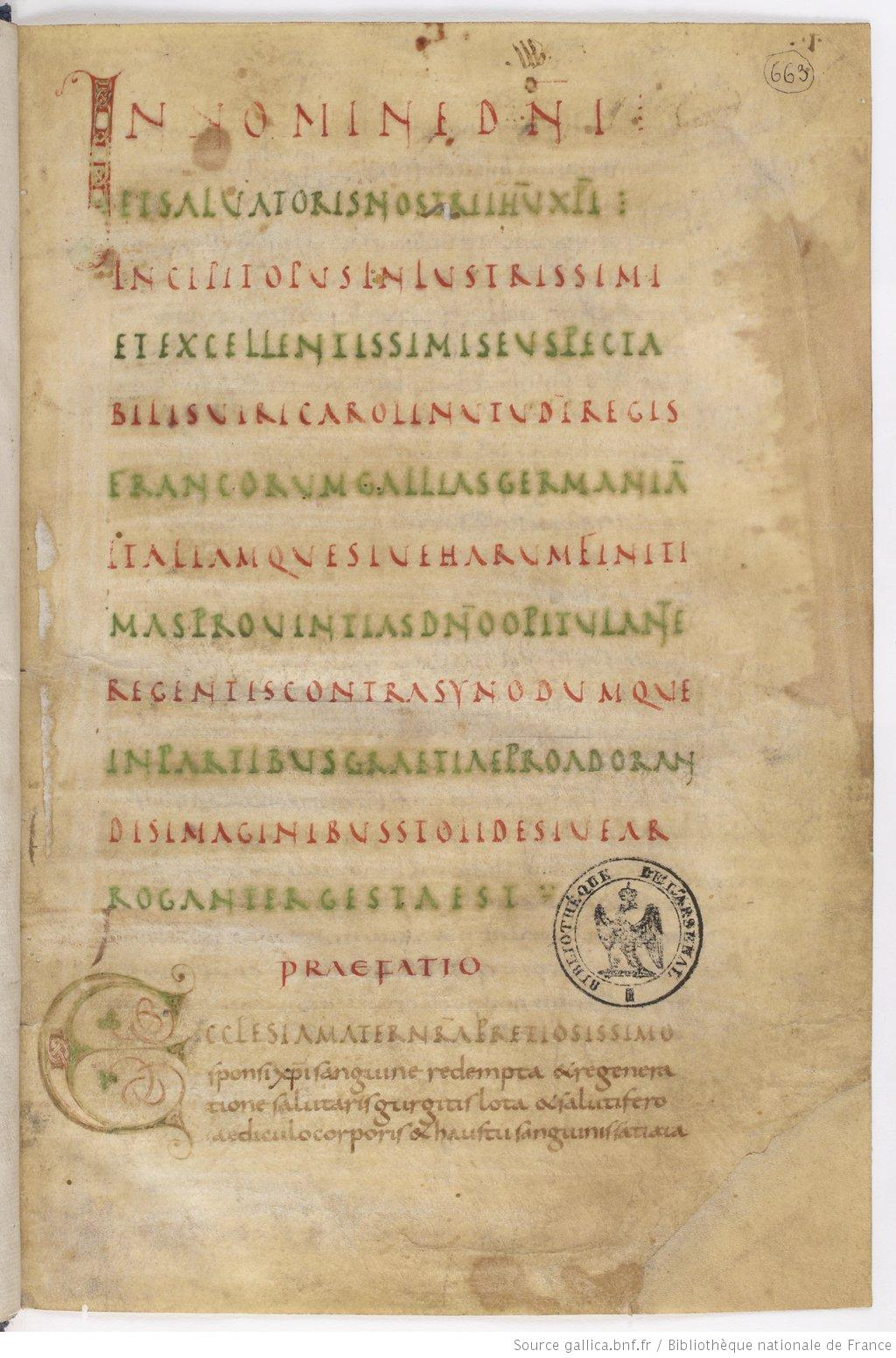
Page from the Reims manuscript of the Libri Carolini.

The Libri Carolini ("Charles' books"), more correctly Opus Caroli regis contra synodum ("The work of King Charles against the Synod"), is a work in four books composed on the command of Charlemagne in the mid 790s to refute the conclusions of the Byzantine Second Council of Nicaea (787), particularly as regards the matter of sacred images. They are "much the fullest statement of the Western attitude to representational art that has been left to us by the Middle Ages".

Two earlier Frankish tracts against images (known in conjunction as the Capitulare adversus synodum) had been sent in 792 to Pope Hadrian I, who had replied with an attempt at a refutation. The Libri Carolini was then composed as a fuller rebuttal of Hadrian's position. But Charlemagne realized that further controversy with Rome would serve no purpose, and the work was never sent.

It remained unknown until it was published by Jean du Tillet in 1549, in the very different context of the debates over images at the Reformation. John Calvin refers to it approvingly in later editions of his Institutes of the Christian Religion (Book 1, Ch 11, section 14), and uses it in his argument against the veneration of images.

== Authorship ==
The work begins, "In the name of our Lord and Savior Jesus Christ beginneth the work of the most illustrious and glorious man Charles, by the will of God, king of the Franks, Gauls, Germany, Italy, neighboring provinces, with the assistance of the king, against the Synod which in Greek parts firmly and proudly decreed in favour of adoring (adorandis) images recklessly and arrogantly," followed immediately by what is called "Charlemagne's Preface". However, it is unlikely that Charlemagne wrote any of the books himself, although the views expressed were influenced by him. He apparently did not accept that art had any advantages over books, a view not held by many of his advisers.

The preferred candidate as author of most modern scholars, following Anne Freeman, is Bishop Theodulf of Orleans, a Spanish Visigoth in origin, of which traces can be detected in the Latin and the liturgical references in the work. The Vatican manuscript has an author, considered to be Theodulf, and a corrector. It is very likely that several clerics at the court contributed to discussions formulating a work to be issued in the Emperor's name, but it seems likely that Theodulf composed the text we have.

In the past, some have attributed the writings to Angilram, Bishop of Metz or others of the bishops of France, alleging that Pope Adrian having sent Charlemagne the Acts of the Council in 790, he gave them to the French bishops for examination, and that the Libri Carolini was the answer they returned. There is also evidence that the author was Alcuin; besides the English tradition that he had written such a book, there is also the remarkable similarity of his commentary on St. John (4, 5, et seqq.) to a passage in Liber IV., cap. vi., of the Libri Carolini.

== Contents ==
According to the Libri Carolini, images may be used as ecclesiastical ornaments, for purposes of instruction, and in memory of past events. It is foolish, however, to burn incense before them and to use lights, though it is quite wrong to cast them out of the churches and destroy them.

The work failed to appreciate the distinction made at the Second Council of Nicaea between the veneration and worship reserved to God alone and the veneration of honour to be paid to images. There was indeed one passage in the Acts of Nicaea which had been mistranslated as confusing the two; and this passage is duly pilloried in the Libri. But other passages in the Libri show awareness that Nicaea made this distinction, e.g. at III. 27, which paraphrases Nicaea as saying that We do not adore images as God nor do we pay them divine worship. But the Libri argue that the distinction made at Nicaea between worship and honour does not justify praying to images or attributing miraculous powers to them, as Nicaea had claimed.

The text points out that the patristic passages cited by Hadrian in support of his position expressed approval of images as a catechetical aid but not of their veneration; it argues forcibly (at III. 17) that it was absurd to require the veneration of images, when generations of martyrs and holy monks had not venerated them; the veneration of images was not to be put on a par with faith.

The old charge that the Franks were misled by a bad translation and failed to appreciate the subtleties of Byzantine theology has therefore been abandoned in sound recent scholarship.

In arguing against Pope Hadrian the Libri also appealed to a letter by Gregory the Great (Registrum XI. 10) that had argued that Pictures are placed in churches not to be adored but purely to instruct the minds of the ignorant. It was therefore able to claim that Hadrian in defending Nicaea II was betraying the true tradition of the Roman Church.

The contents were interpreted by Calvin and other iconoclast writers during the Protestant Reformation as support for their attitude. They were also put on the Index Librorum Prohibitorum, where they remained until 1900, either because of their iconoclastic arguments or because seen as interference by a civil authority in matters of Church doctrine.

== Editions ==
- Freeman, Ann, with Paul Meyvaert. Opus Caroli regis contra synodum (Libri Carolini), Hannover 1998 (=Monumenta Germaniae Historica, Concilia, Bd. 2, Supplementum I).

=== In English translation ===
- Partial English translation: Caecilia Davis-Weyer, ed. Early Medieval Art 300–1150: Sources and Documents (Toronto: University of Toronto Press, 1986), pp. 100–103.
