= Recueil des rois de France =

1566 illuminated manuscript by Jean du Tillet

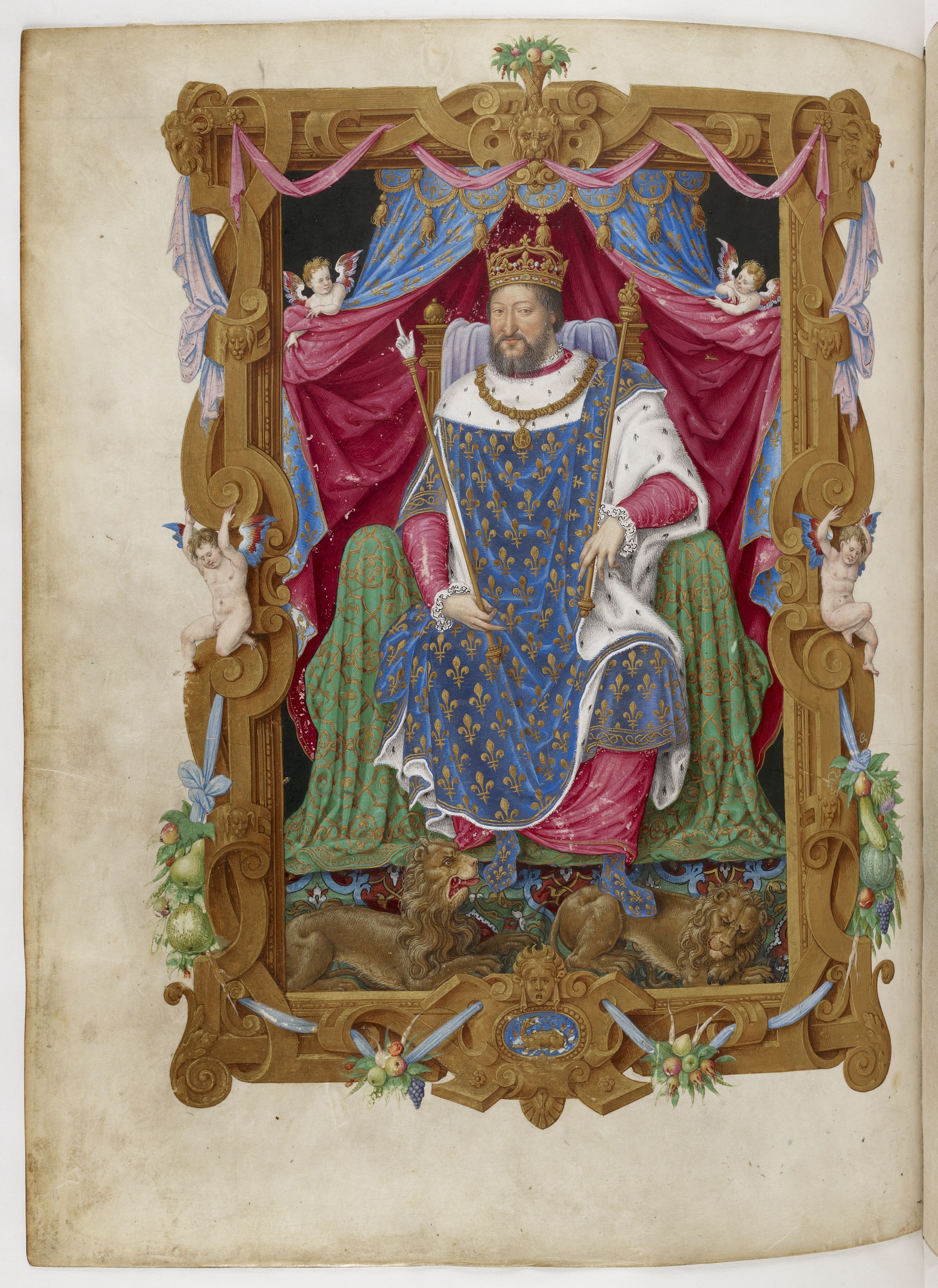
- Francis I in old age, f.150v.
- Artists: Jean du Tillet (writer) and the Master of the Hours of Henry II (miniatures)
- Year: c. 1547?–1566
- Medium: Illumination on parchment
- Dimensions: 294 bound folios
- Location: Bibliothèque nationale de France, Paris, France

The Recueil des rois de France (Collection of the Kings of France) is an illuminated manuscript containing a text by Jean du Tillet. Dedicated to Charles IX in 1566, it provides a history of the French monarchs from the early Merovingians to Francis I and is illustrated with portraits of 29 sovereigns. It is currently held at the Bibliothèque nationale de France under the shelfmark Fr.2848.

== History ==
The manuscript is the luxury presentation copy offered to Charles IX in 1566 by Jean du Tillet, the civil registrar (greffier) of the Parlement of Paris. Du Tillet had previously authored an earlier version of this collection presented between 1553 and 1555 to Charles's father, Henry II, which contained a genealogy of French kings followed by the author's observations on various elements of French history. Authorized to consult and inventory royal archives as early as the 1540s under Francis I, it is unclear exactly when he decided to expand this work. His progress was likely delayed by the King's death and his subsequent involvement in writing pamphlets supporting the House of Guise or opposing Protestant factions. By the time he completed the current manuscript, its volume had doubled compared to the version offered to Henry II.

The miniatures are likely older than the manuscript itself and were added to it later. Originally, each miniature was placed on the verso (left-hand) page facing the start of a chapter. In the current manuscript, they are generally pasted back-to-back on a single leaf (recto-verso), suggesting they were removed from an earlier volume. Furthermore, the style of the miniatures is relatively primitive compared to the 1566 dedication date. Historians attribute them to the Master of the Hours of Henry II, an artist active in Paris during the mid-16th century and a likely successor to Noël Bellemare. Some elements may have been added or updated specifically for the current manuscript, such as a frontispiece with the arms of Charles IX, portraits of Chlothar III and Charlemagne, and various floral borders. Notably, Francis I is the only king depicted twice—once as a young man and once as an elder—and no subsequent kings (Henry II, Francis II, or Charles IX) are included. This suggests the miniatures might have been executed during the reign of Francis I but left unfinished following his death, which would explain the absence of a portrait for Louis XII.

Two other manuscripts produced during the era of Charles IX exist: one currently in the Library of Geneva (Fr.84), perhaps intended for du Tillet himself or another member of the Parlement; and another in the National Library of Russia (SP Fr.f.v.IV, no. 9). Both contain identical illustrations to the primary manuscript. The St. Petersburg copy may have served as a "pitch" book, rapidly produced for Charles IX or his mother Catherine de' Medici to secure funding for the final work. Records suggest that even after completing the masterpiece, du Tillet was never reimbursed for his expenses. Consequently, the work was not printed during his lifetime. The text was first published in 1578—eight years after du Tillet's death—in clandestine editions in Rouen and Troyes. An official edition commissioned by his descendants followed in 1580, featuring engravings of the royal portraits and remaining in print until 1618.

Upon the death of Charles IX, his library was dispersed. The manuscript reappeared in the collection of Gaston, Duke of Orléans and entered the royal library following Gaston's death in 1660.

== Description ==
=== Text ===
The work is written on thick parchment in a script distinct from other contemporary manuscripts, as it utilizes the legal hand (écriture de greffe) used by the Parliament of Paris. The first section contains a biographical description of each king from Merovech to Francis I. In these chapters, du Tillet cites extracts from archival documents he consulted or refers to significant legal acts. The second part consists of general observations on the history of France, royal institutions, customs, and the origins of the French people. Du Tillet synthesized a wide array of sources, including royal archives, Latin authors like Gregory of Tours, and medieval chroniclers like Jean de Joinville. He also relied on physical evidence, such as royal tombs he observed at the Basilica of Saint-Denis, Saint-Germain-des-Prés, and Abbey of Saint-Médard, Soissons. The text is punctuated by illustrations of seals and coats of arms. The manuscript has been described by Brown and Dickman Orth, in their joint study, as "the most splendid and most substantial of several works that Jean du Tillet (c. 1500-1570) offered in presentation copies to Henri II and Charles IX."

=== Royal portraits ===
The manuscript contains 30 portraits of 29 kings (Francis I is depicted twice). Unlike the fictionalized portraits common in contemporary manuscripts, these images were inspired by models taken from surviving funerary monuments and royal seals.

Models were drawn from monuments in:

- Saint-Denis: Charles the Bald
- Saint-Germain-des-Prés: Chilperic I and Fredegund
- Saint-Médard de Soissons: Chlothar I, Sigebert I
- Abbey of Saint-Remi: Louis IV, Lothair
- Saint-Fursy de Péronne: Charles the Simple

Beginning with Louis VI, the miniatures were based on seals found in the royal archives. As a result, the kings are shown in hieratic poses—either standing or seated on a throne—matching their source material. Only the faces of Francis I appear more lifelike, potentially based on life drawings by Jean Clouet or François Clouet from circa 1520 and 1540.

Examples of portraits from the collection

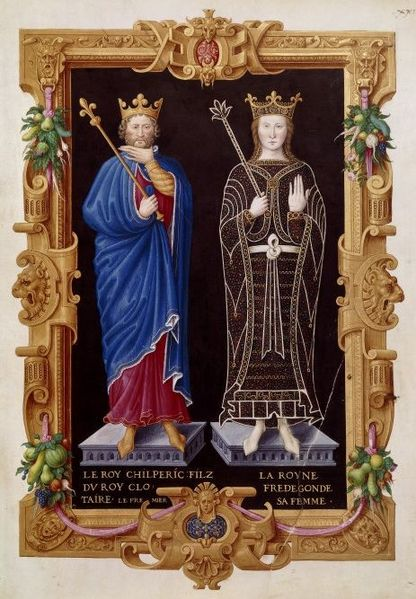
Chilperic I and Fredegund

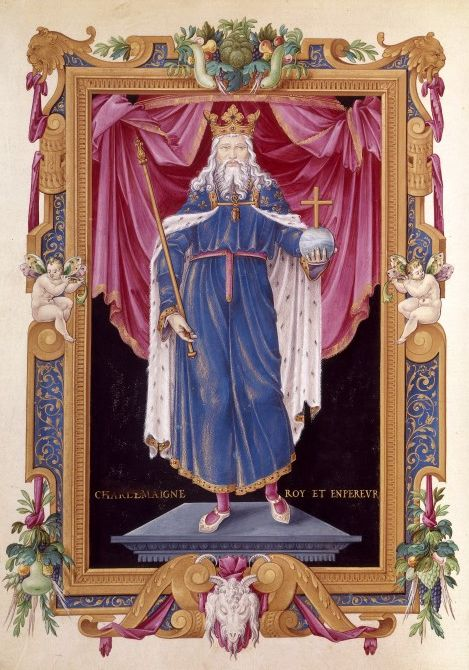
Charlemagne

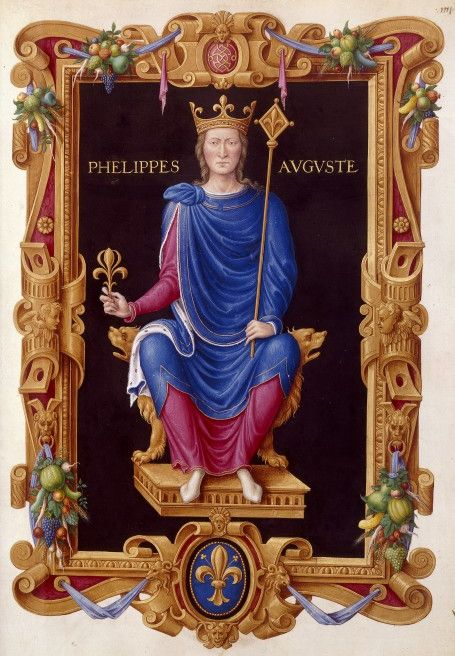
Philip II Augustus

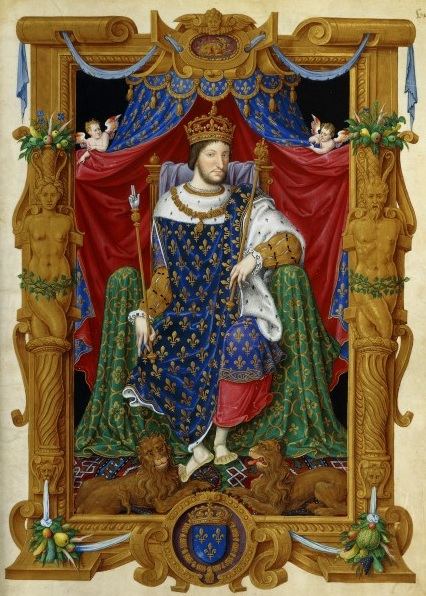
Francis I as a young man

The miniatures are dated between 1547 and 1555 based on their frames, which resemble those in the Hours of Anne de Montmorency and the Hours of Henry II. This stylistic link supports the attribution to the Master of the Hours of Henry II. Only two portraits—Charlemagne and Chlothar III—show a different hand and likely date from the 1560s.

== See also ==
- School of Fontainebleau
- Gaston, Duke of Orléans
- Chantiers de l'Atlantique
- Jean Clouet
- François Clouet
- French Renaissance
- List of French monarchs

== Bibliography ==
- Crépin-Leblond, Thierry; Dickman Orth, Myra (1993). Livres d'heures royaux: la peinture de manuscrits à la cour de France au temps d'Henri II [Royal Books of Hours: manuscript painting at the French court in the time of Henry II] (in French). Paris: Réunion des Musées Nationaux. ISBN 2-7118-2903-0.
- Brown, Elizabeth A.R.; Dickman Orth, Myra (1997). "Jean du Tillet et les illustrations du grand «Recueil des roys»" [Jean du Tillet and the illustrations of the grand “Recueil des roys”]. Revue de l'Art (in French). 115. Translated by Bouniort, Jeanne: 7–24. doi:10.3406/rvart.1997.348307. Archived from the original on April 29, 2025.
