= Louis du Tillet =

French cleric

Louis du Tillet was a French cleric and one-time friend of John Calvin.

He was the fourth son of Elie du Tillet, and entered the church, becoming at canon of Angoulême Cathedral and holding a curacy at Claix.

Du Tillet became friends with Calvin, who took refuge at the du Tillet estate in late 1533, and taught Louis Greek. The two left France together in October 1534, and went to Strasbourg and Geneva. du Tillet stayed with Calvin until 1537, when he returned to France and the Roman Catholic Church. Calvin and du Tillet corresponded over the next year, with du Tillet indicating that he "never believed Calvin had a calling from God to do what we was doing," Calvin referred to du Tillet (without mentioning his name) in the preface to his commentary on the Psalms: "Then an individual who now basely apostatised and returned to the Papists, discovered me and made me known to others."
