= Jean du Tillet (bishop) =

French Catholic bishop

- Church: Roman Catholic
- Diocese: Saint-Brieuc (1553); Meaux (1564)

Personal details
- Died: 1570

Jean du Tillet (Angoulême c.1500/9? – 18 December 1570) was a French Catholic bishop.

== Life ==
The son of Elie du Tillet, a mayor and captain of Angoulême under Francis I, he was appointed bishop of Saint-Brieuc in 1553. Although a Gallican, he took part in the Council of Trent, where he encouraged Gentian Hervet to undertake a Latin translation of Photius' Syntagma together with Balsamon's interpretation from a manuscript which had recently come into his possession. Tillet also in 1553 obtained in Rome a Hebrew version of St. Matthew's Gospel.

In 1564 he became bishop of Meaux, the fifteenth known Jean to hold that see. In 1568 he published an edition of works of Lucifer of Caralis against emperor Constantius II.

He had a brother also named Jean du Tillet, with whom he collaborated in scholarship. Another brother, Louis, curé of Claix and archdeacon of Angoulême, gave shelter to Jean Calvin, then followed him to Germany; he was very disappointed by what he saw and Jean brought him back to France.

He owned the only known manuscript of the Annales Tiliani, which bear his name. It is now lost. He also owned a manuscript of the Libri Carolini, which he was the first to publish in 1549.

== Works ==
- Du symbole des Apostres et des douze articles de la foy (1566)
- Réponse d'un évêque aux ministres des églises nouvelles (Paris, 1566);
- Traité de l'antiquité et solennité de la messe (Paris, 1567);
- Avis à Messieurs les gentilhommes séduits par les piperies des églises nouvelles (Advice to the gentlemen seduced by the fallacies of the new churches) (Paris, 1567);
- Parallelae de vitis ac moribus paparum cum proecipuis ethnicis (1610) (in Latin).

=== Misattributed works ===
- The Discours sur la majorité du roi très-chrétien contre les écrits des rebelles, which was published under his name (Paris, 1560), was actually written by his brother Jean, sieur de Bussière.
- The Mémoire et advis fait en l'an 1551 sur les libertés de l'Église gallicane, 1594 (On the liberties of the Church of France) was also written by his brother Jean. (Digitized edition available on Google books)
