= Diocese of Meaux =

Catholic diocese in France

Coordinates: 48.9602°N 2.87975°E

Diocese of Meaux Dioecesis Meldensis Diocèse de Meaux

Catholic
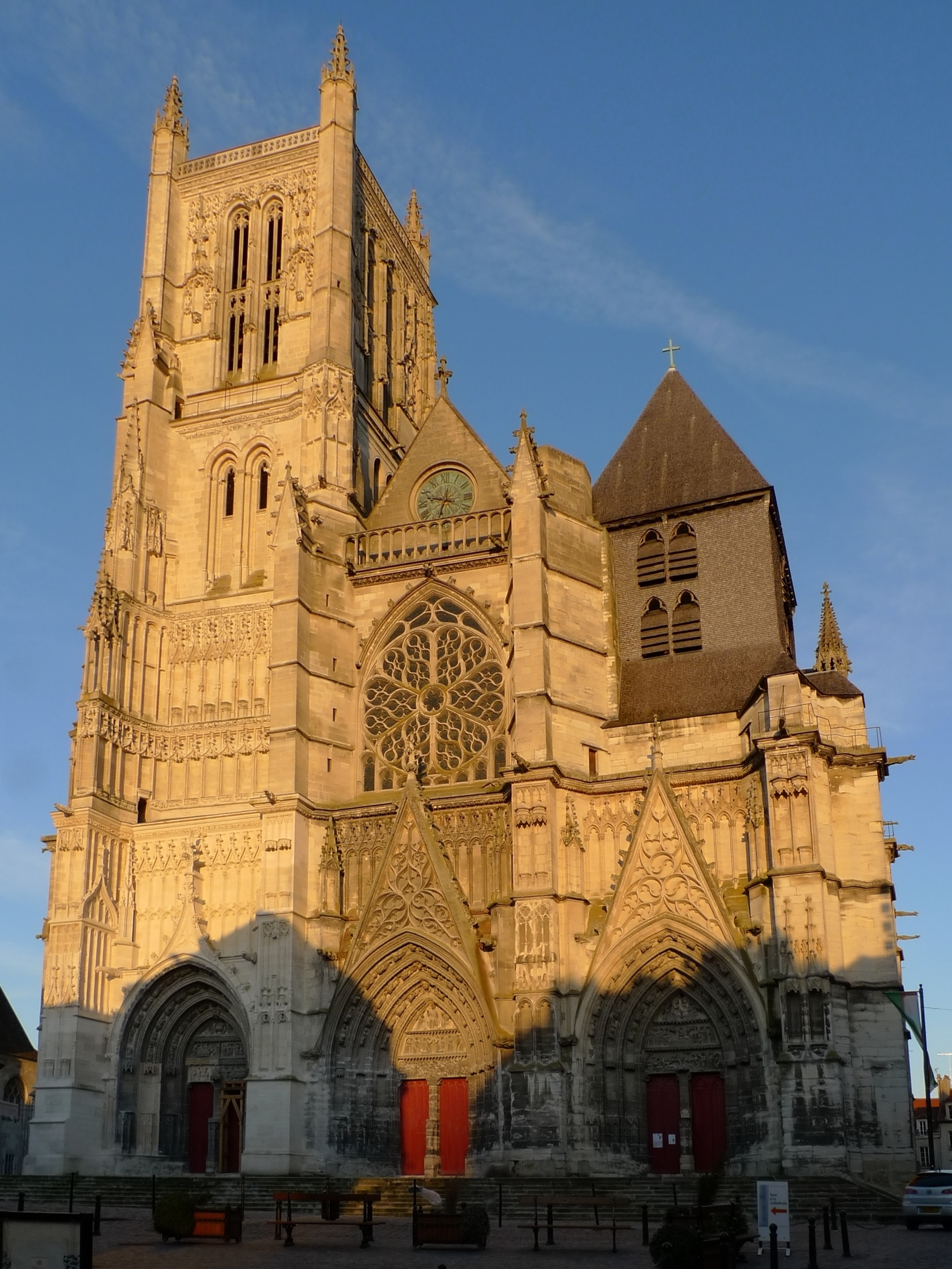
- Cathedral of St.-Étienne, Meaux

Location
- Country: France
- Ecclesiastical province: Paris
- Metropolitan: Archdiocese of Paris

Statistics
- Area: 5,931 km^{2} (2,290 sq mi)
- Population: Total; Catholics: (as of 2021); 1,423,607; 881,700 (61.9%)
- Parishes: 17

Information
- Denomination: Catholic
- Sui iuris church: Latin Church
- Rite: Roman Rite
- Established: 3rd Century
- Cathedral: Cathedral Basilica of St. Stephen in Meaux
- Patron saint: Saint Stephen
- Secular priests: 114 (Diocesan); 24 (Religious Orders); 46 Permanent Deacons

Current leadership
- Pope: Leo XIV
- Bishop: Jean-Yves Nahmias
- Metropolitan Archbishop: Laurent Ulrich
- Auxiliary Bishops: Guillaume Leschallier de Lisle

Map

Website
- catho77.fr

The Diocese of Meaux (Latin: Dioecesis Meldensis; French: Diocèse de Meaux) is a Latin diocese of the Catholic Church in France. The diocese comprises the entire department of Seine-et-Marne. It was suffragan of the Archdiocese of Sens until 1622, and subsequently of Archdiocese of Paris.

== History ==
=== Creation ===
The present Diocese of Meaux is made up of the greater part of the former Diocese of Meaux, a large part of the former Diocese of Sens, a part of the former Diocese of Paris, and a few parishes of the former Dioceses of Troyes, Soissons and Senlis. Hildegar, who lived in the ninth century, says in his "Life of St. Faro" (Burgundofaro), that this bishop was the twentieth since Denis of Paris.

According to the tradition accepted by Hildegaire, Denis was the first bishop of Meaux, and was succeeded by his disciple Saintin, who in turn was succeeded by Antoninus; Rigomer occupied the See of Meaux at the close of the fifth century. This episcopal list, however, is without credibility. In 876 or 877, Hincmar showed Charles the Bald a document which he claimed had been transcribed from a very old copy and according to which Antoninus and Saintin, disciples of Denis, had brought to Pope Anacletus (c. 79–91) the account of the martyrdom of Denis, and on their return to Gaul had successively occupied the See of Meaux. However, the same document reports that, during their trip to Rome, Antoninus died and was resurrected from the dead by Saintin, hardly a circumstance to inspire confidence in the document or the events described in it.

=== Councils ===
A council convoked in 845 at Meaux by Charles the Bald adopted important measures for the re-establishment of discipline in the three ecclesiastical provinces of Sens, Bourges, and Reims. Other councils were held at Meaux in 962, 1082, 1204, 1229 (ended in Paris), where the Count of Toulouse was reconciled with the church; in 1240 a council was held in which the sentence of excommunication was pronounced against Frederick II by Joannes of Palestrina, legate of Gregory IX; there was held an important council in 1523. Four councils were held at Melun, in 1216, 1225, 1232, 1300. The city of Provins was famous in the Middle Ages for its burlesque ceremonies (fête de fous, fête do l'âne, fête des Innocents) held in the church. The church of Champigny has a magnificent crypt dating from the thirteenth century.

The cathedral of St-Etienne de Meaux is a fine Gothic edifice begun about 1170. The pouillé of 1353 shows that the Chapter of the Cathedral had six dignities and at least thirty-seven Canons (who are named). The dignities were: the Dean, the Archdeacon of Meaux, the Archdeacon of Brie, the Cantor, the Treasurer and the Chancellor.

=== Notable events ===
Pope Eugene III stayed some days at Meaux from 12 to 30 June 1147.

In 1562 most of the inhabitants of Meaux had become Protestants. In the First War of Religion Joachim de Montluc, sent by the king, proceeded with rigour against them. They were still sufficiently powerful in 1567 to attempt to carry off, in the vicinity of Meaux, Catherine de' Medici and Charles IX. Shortly after St. Bartholomew's day in August 1572, the Protestants of Meaux were massacred. At the château of Fontainebleau, built by Francis I, was held the theological conference of 4 May 1600, between the Catholics (Cardinal du Perron, de Thou, Pithou) and the Calvinists (du Plessis Mornay, Philippe Canaye, Isaac Casaubon).

In 1664, John Eudes preached for two months at Meaux. Jeanne Guyon passed the first six months of 1695 at the Visitation convent of Meaux, where Bossuet had frequent conferences with her, but failed to make her abandon her mystic views.

Jean Nicolas Loriquet was superior of the preparatory seminary (the Pétit Seminaire) of Châage, in the Diocese of Meaux, from 1812 to 1814. He was particularly famous for his insistence on the importance of history in the curriculum, and for his elementary textbooks in the subject. His Histoire de France was anti-revolutionary and anti-Napoleonic, and caused controversy for some decades.

=== Revolution ===
The diocese of Meaux was abolished during the French Revolution by the Legislative Assembly, under the Civil Constitution of the Clergy (1790). Its territory was subsumed into the new diocese, called 'Seine-et-Marne', which was part of the Metropolitanate called the 'Metropole de Paris' (which included seven new 'départements'). The Civil Constitution mandated that bishops be elected by the citizens of each 'département', which immediately raised the most severe canonical questions, since the electors did not need to be Catholics and the approval of the Pope was not only not required, but actually forbidden. Erection of new dioceses and transfer of bishops, moreover, was not in the competence of civil authorities or of the church in France. The result was schism between the 'Constitutional Church' and the Roman Catholic Church. The legitimate bishop of Meaux, Camille de Polignac, refused to take the oath, and therefore the episcopal seat was declared vacant. Two-thirds of the clergy of Meaux, however, took the oath.

On 27 February 1791 the electors of Seine-et-Marne were assembled, and on 18 March, after three ballots, they elected the parish priest of Dontilly, Pierre Thuin. Thuin travelled to Paris for his consecration, which was carried out on 27 March by Jean-Baptiste Gobel, the titular Bishop of Lydda, who had just been installed as Constitutional Bishop of Paris. Thuin's installation at Meaux was not attended by the Canons of the Cathedral or by the directors of the diocesan seminary. Bishop de Polignac emigrated to Switzerland and then to Hungary; he did not return until 1814. Thuin, and all the Constitutional Bishops, were required to resign in May 1801 by First Consul Bonaparte, who was negotiating a treaty with Pope Pius VII, the Concordat of 1801 (15 July 1801). Once the Concordat went into effect, Pius VII was able to issue the appropriate bulls to restore many of the dioceses and to regulate their boundaries, most of which corresponded closely to the new 'départements'.

The Concordat of 1801 gave to the Diocese of Meaux the department of Marne, but in 1821 and 1822 the territory of the department of Marne was separated from Meaux and distributed to the Diocese of Reims and the Diocese of Châlons.

=== Bishops of Meaux ===
==== Prior to 1300 ====
- Medovechus (attested 549, 552)
- Gundoaldus (attested 614, 627)
- Faro (Burgundofarus) (626–672)
- Hildevertus (672–680);
- Herlingus (attested 683)
- [Pathus];
- Ebrigisilus (end of the seventh century);
- Gilbert of Meaux (c. 995 – 1015);
- Macarius (attested 1011)
- Bernerus (attested 1029)
- Dagobertus
- Galterius (c. 1045 – 1082)
- Robert (1082–1085)
- Gauthier de Chambly (1085–1105)
- Manasses I (1105 – 9 January 1120)
- Burchardus (1120 – 3/4 January 1134)
- Manasses II (1134–1158)
- Rainaldus (1158 – 1 May 1161)
- Hugues (1161)
- Étienne de la Chapelle (1162–1171)
- Pietro da Pavia (c. 1171 – c. 1176)
- Simon (1176 – 7 May 1195)
- Ansellus (1195–1207)
- Gaufrid de Cressy (Poissy) (1208–1213)
- Guillaume de Nemours (1214 – 19 August 1221)
- Almaric (1221–1222)
- Pierre de Cuisy (1223–1255)
- Alermus de Cuisy (1255 – 13 August 1267)
- Jean de Poincy (1267 – 27 October 1269)
- Jean de Garlande (1269–?)
- Jean (11 April 1288 – ?)
- Adam de Vaudoy (1289–1298?)
- [Gaufridus 'Butticularius'] (July–September 1298)

==== From 1300 to 1600 ====
- Nicolas Vole (1305 – 18 April 1308)
- Simon Festu (18 October 1308 – 30 December 1317)
- Guillaume de Brosse (14 February 1318 – 27 February 1321)
- Pierre de Moussy (17 February 1321 – 7 October 1325)
- Durand de St-Pourçain (13 March 1326 – 10 September 1334)
- Jean de Meulan (12 October 1334 – 3 January 1351)
- Philippe de Vitry (1351–1361);
- Jean Royer (6 September 1361 – 29 April 1377)
- Guillaume de Dormans (11 February 1379 – 17 October 1390) (Avignon Obedience)
- Pierre Fresnel (17 October 1390 – 20 August 1409)(Avignon Obedience);
- Jean de Saintes (20 August 1409 – 20 September 1418) (appointed by Alexander V)
- Robert de Girème (10 July 1419 – 19 January 1426)
- Jean de Briou (8 April 1426 – 17 August 1435)
- Pasquier de Vaux (23 September 1435 – 25 October 1439)
- Pierre de Versailles (25 September 1439 – 1446)
- Jean le Meunier
- Jean du Drac
- Tristan de Salazar
- Louis de Meldun
- Jean d'Huillier
- Jean de Pierrefonds (13 November 1500 – 2 September 1510)
- Louis Pinelle (30 April 1511 – 1515)
- Guillaume Briçonnet (31 December 1515 – 1534)
- Cardinal Antoine du Prat (1534–1535);
- Jean de Buz (13 August 1535 – 9 October 1552)
- Louis de Brézé (1554–1564);
- Jean du Tillet (1564–1570);
- Louis de Brézé (1570–1589);
- Alexandre de la Marche (15 October 1589 – 1594)
- [Jean Touchard] (1594–1597)
- Louis l'Hôpital (13 July 1597 – 1602) in commendam

==== From 1600 to 1800 ====
- Jean de Vieupont (22 April 1602 – 16 August 1623)
- Jean de Belleau (15 July 1624 – 16 August 1637)
- Dominique Séguier (10 January 1637 – 16 May 1659);
- Dominique de Ligny (13 January 1659 – 27 April 1681)
- Jacques Bossuet (1681–1704);
- Cardinal Henri-Pons de Thiard de Bissy (1705–1737)
- Antoine-René de la Roche de Fontenille (1737–1759)
- Jean-Louis de Marthonie de Caussade (1759–1779)
- Camille-Louis-Apollinaire de Polignac (1779–1801)
  - Pierre Thuin (Constitutional Bishop) (18 March 1791 – 1801)

==== Since 1800 ====
- Louis-Mathias, Count de Barral (1802–1805).
- Pierre-Paul de Faudoas (1805–1819)
- Jean-Joseph-Marie-Victoire de Cosnac (1819–1830)
- Romain-Frédéric Gallard (1831–1839)
- Auguste Allou (1839–1884)
- Marie-Ange-Emmanuel de Briey (1884–1909)
- Emmanuel-Jules-Marie Marbeau (3 February 1910 – 31 May 1921)
- Louis-Joseph Gaillard (21 November 1921 – 25 September 1931)
- Frédéric Lamy (16 August 1932 – 20 August 1936)
- Joseph Evrard (1 February 1937 – 25 July 1942)
- Georges-Louis-Camille Debray (25 July 1942 – 29 April 1961)
- Jacques Ménager (7 December 1961 – 13 July 1973)
- Louis Kuehn (13 May 1974 – 27 August 1986)
- Guy Gaucher (27 August 1986 – 7 May 1987)
- Louis Cornet (31 July 1987 – 17 August 1999)
- Albert-Marie de Monléon (17 August 1999 – 9 August 2012)

==== Bishop-emeritus ====
The bishop emeritus is Albert-Marie Joseph Cyrille de Monléon (born 20 January 1937, in Paris, who was installed on 10 October 1999 following his transfer from the post of Bishop of Pamiers. On Thursday, 9 August 2012, Pope Benedict XVI accepted the resignation of Bishop de Monléon, who had reached the mandatory retirement age of 75, from the Diocese of Meaux, and appointed as the next bishop of the Roman Catholic Diocese of Meaux, Auxiliary Bishop Jean-Yves Nahmias, Auxiliary Bishop of the Roman Catholic Archdiocese of Paris.

==== Current bishop ====
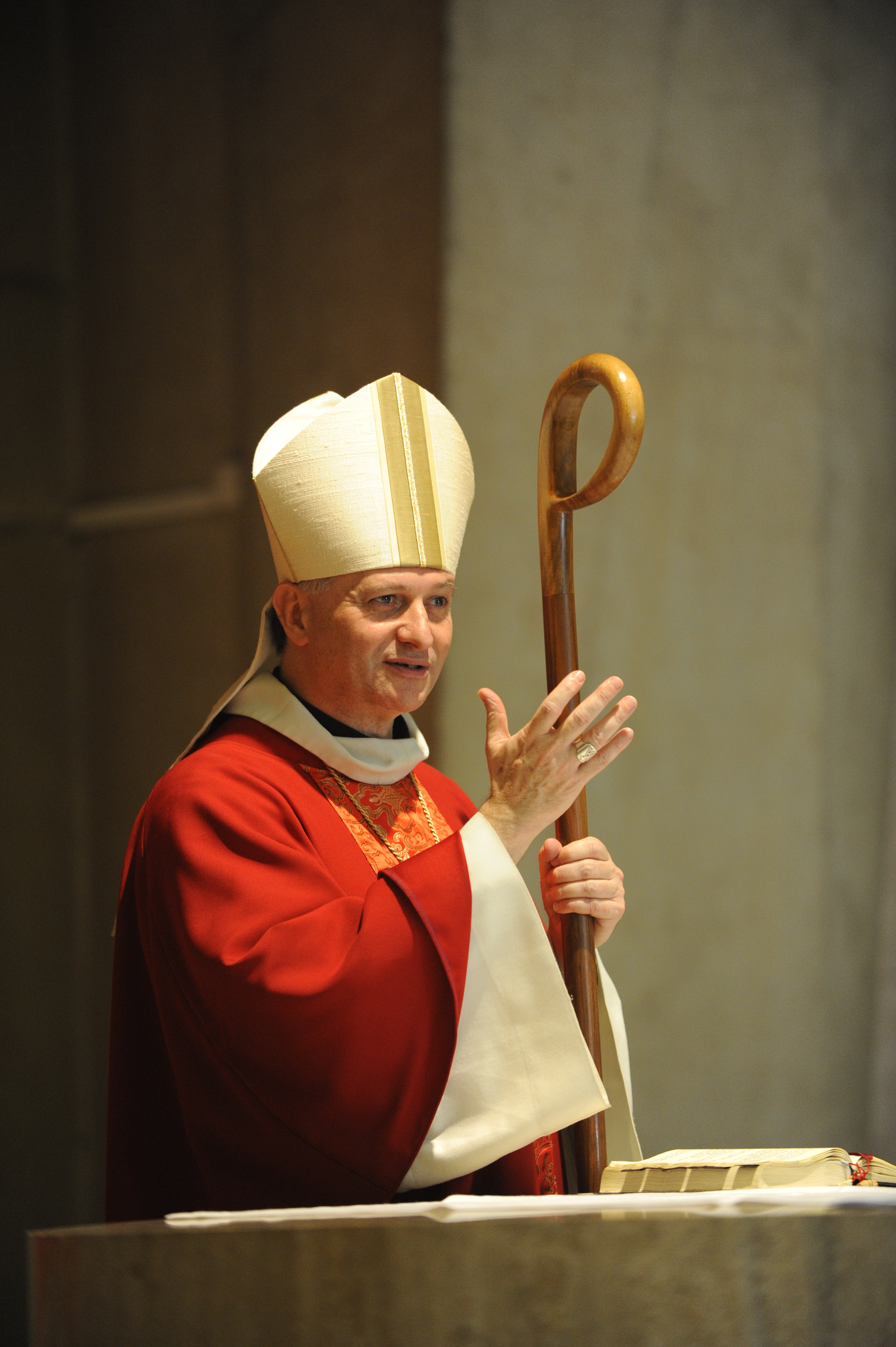
Bishop Jean-Yves Nahmias

Bishop Jean-Yves Nahmias was born on 16 September 1957, in Saint-Mand, near Paris, in the Roman Catholic Diocese of Créteil in Créteil, France. He studied at the University of Paris I, where he has been a member of G.F.U. (Groupes de Formation Universitaire); he graduated with a License in Financial Law. He pursued his studies in philosophy and theology for two years at the Pontifical Gregorian University in Rome, then as a student of the French Seminary in Rome, and then in the Institute of Theological Studies in Brussels, where he obtained a Licentiate in Sacred Theology in 1991. Nahmias was ordained to the priesthood on 24 June 1989, and was incardinated for service to the Roman Catholic Archdiocese of Paris. Nahmias served as Parochial Vicar (Assistant Pastor) at the Parish of Notre-Dame de la Croix, Paris, and as a chaplain in Public Schools Jean-Baptiste-Clément, Etienne Dolet and Martin Nadaud (1990–1994). In addition, from 1992 to 1996, was in charge of the Diocesan Service for Vocations, and from 1993, Director of Office for Vocations. Later, he was the parochial vicar at the Parish Saint-Ambroise, and a chaplain in Public Schools Voltaire and Alain-Fournier (1994–1996). He became rector of the Archdiocesan Seminary of Paris and the diocesan delegate for the Seminarians (1996–2001); and finally, was the vicar general of the Archdiocese of Paris under Cardinals Jean-Marie Lustiger and André Vingt-Trois (2001–2006). Nahmias was appointed as Titular Bishop of Termini Imerese and Auxiliary Bishop of Paris on 1 June 2006, by Pope Benedict XVI, and was consecrated a bishop on 8 September 2006. He serves as President of Radio Notre-Dame. Within the French Bishops' Conference, he serves on the Board for Communication.

== See also ==
- Catholic Church in France

== Bibliography ==
=== Reference works ===
- Benedictines of Saint-Maur (1744). Gallia christiana, in provincias ecclesiasticas distributa: Carnotensis (in Latin). Vol. Tomus octavus (VIII). Paris: ex Typographia Regia. pp. 1592–1754.
- Eubel, Conradus, ed. (1913). Hierarchia catholica, Tomus 1 (second ed.). Münster: Libreria Regensbergiana. pp. 333–334. (in Latin)
- Eubel, Conradus, ed. (1914). Hierarchia catholica, Tomus 2 (second ed.). Münster: Libreria Regensbergiana. p. 189 (in Latin)
- Eubel, Conradus, ed. (1923). Hierarchia catholica, Tomus 3 (second ed.). Münster: Libreria Regensbergiana.
- Gams, Pius Bonifatius (1873). Series episcoporum Ecclesiae catholicae: quotquot innotuerunt a beato Petro apostolo. Ratisbon: Typis et Sumptibus Georgii Josephi Manz. pp. 548–549. (Use with caution; obsolete)
- Gauchat, Patritius (Patrice) (1935). Hierarchia catholica IV (1592-1667). Münster: Libraria Regensbergiana. p. 237 (in Latin)
- Ritzler, Remigius; Sefrin, Pirminus (1952). Hierarchia catholica medii et recentis aevi V (1667-1730). Patavii: Messagero di S. Antonio. p. 263 (in Latin)
- Ritzler, Remigius; Sefrin, Pirminus (1958). Hierarchia catholica medii et recentis aevi VI (1730-1799). Patavii: Messagero di S. Antonio. p. 284. (in Latin)
- Ritzler, Remigius; Sefrin, Pirminus (1968). Hierarchia Catholica medii et recentioris aevi sive summorum pontificum, S. R. E. cardinalium, ecclesiarum antistitum series... A pontificatu Pii PP. VII (1800) usque ad pontificatum Gregorii PP. XVI (1846) (in Latin). Vol. VII. Monasterii: Libr. Regensburgiana.
- Ritzler, Remigius; Pirminus Sefrin (1978). Hierarchia catholica Medii et recentioris aevi... A Pontificatu PII PP. IX (1846) usque ad Pontificatum Leonis PP. XIII (1903) (in Latin). Vol. VIII. Il Messaggero di S. Antonio.
- Pięta, Zenon (2002). Hierarchia catholica medii et recentioris aevi... A pontificatu Pii PP. X (1903) usque ad pontificatum Benedictii PP. XV (1922) (in Latin). Vol. IX. Padua: Messagero di San Antonio. ISBN 978-88-250-1000-8.

=== Studies ===
- Allou, Auguste (1875). Chronique des évêques de Meaux suivie d'un état de l'ancien diocèse et du diocèse actuel (in French). Meaux: A. Cochet. [agglutinative, POV-Catholic, hagiographic]
- Duchesne, Louis (1910). Fastes épiscopaux de l'ancienne Gaule: II. L'Aquitaine et les Lyonnaises. Paris: Fontemoing. pp. 476–479.
- Du Plessis, Michel Toussaint Chrétien (1731). Histoire De L'Eglise De Meaux, Avec Des Notes Ou Dissertations; Et Les Pieces Justificatives (in French). Vol. 2 vols. Paris: Chez Julien-Michel Gandouin.
- Jean, Armand (1891). Les évêques et les archevêques de France depuis 1682 jusqu'à 1801 (in French). Paris: A. Picard. pp. 299–303.
- Néret, Léon-Henri (1905). Martyrs et confesseurs de la foi du diocèse de Meaux, 1792-1799 (in French). Meaux: G. Lépillet.
- Société bibliographique (France) (1907). L'épiscopat français depuis le Concordat jusqu'à la Séparation (1802-1905). Paris: Librairie des Saints-Pères. pp. 346–350.
