= Timeline of Liège =

The following is a timeline of the history of the municipality of Liège, Belgium.

== Prior to 18th century ==
- ca.558 - St Monulph, bishop of Tongres, built a chapel.
- 721 - Catholic see relocated to Liège from Maastricht.
- 965 - Church of St. Martin founded.
- 980 - Prince-Bishopric of Liège established.
- 987 - Church of St. Denis founded.
- 1015
  - Collegiate Church of St. Bartholomew consecrated.
  - Abbey of Saint Jacques founded.
- 1050 - St. Lambert's Cathedral dedicated.
- 1124 - Church of St. Gilles construction begins.
- 1232 - St. Paul's Cathedral construction begins.
- 1255 - Citadel of Liège built.
- 1316 - Paix de Fexhe signed, establishing a somewhat representative government in Liège.
- 1319 - Saint-Julien Hospice founded in Outremeuse.
- 1325 - Guild unrest.
- 1408 - 23 September: Battle of Othée.
- 1468
  - Liège sacked by forces of Charles the Bold of Burgundy.
  - 29 October: Six hundred Franchimontois fight Burgundian forces.
- 1506 - Érard de La Marck becomes Prince-bishop of Liège.

Liège, 16th century

- 1526 - Prince-Bishops' Palace construction begins.
- 1546 - Halle aux viandes de Liège built.
- 1561 - Marché de la Batte (market) active.
- 1594
  - Foire de Liège (festival) begins.
  - Maison Havart built on the Quai de la Goffe.
- 1610 - Palais Curtius built on the Quai de Maestricht.
- 1614 - Béguinage Saint-Esprit founded.
- 1616 - Collège des jésuites anglais (Liège) built.
- 1623 - Béguinage Saint-Christophe de Liège compound built.
- 1637 - April: Murder of Sébastien de La Ruelle sparks anti-Spanish rioting.

== 18th–19th centuries ==
- 1702 - Liége taken by The duke of Marlborough
- 1714 - Liège City Hall built on the Place du Marché (Liège).
- 1747 - Banque Nagelmackers founded.
- 1772 - Church of Saint Andrew, Liège built.
- 1775 - Académie royale des beaux-arts de Liège established.
- 1779 - Société littéraire de Liège and Société libre d'émulation (Liège) founded.
- 1789 - August: Liège Revolution begins; Republic of Liège established.
- 1794 - St. Lambert's Cathedral sacked.
- 1795 - "Union with France decreed."
- 1796
  - Liège becomes part of France.
  - Archives de l'État à Liège established.
- 1812 - Mine accident, 74 men trapped in a flooded mine.
- 1815 - Liège becomes part of the Netherlands, viz. the Congress of Vienna.
- 1817
  - University of Liège founded.
  - Cockerill manufactory in business in nearby Seraing.
- 1820 - Royal Theatre opens.
- 1823 - Fort de la Chartreuse built in Amercœur.
- 1826 - Royal Conservatory of Liège founded.
- 1830 - Liège becomes part of Belgium.
- 1835
  - Ateliers de construction de La Meuse in business.
  - Banque Liégeoise established.
- 1840 - Gazette de Liège newspaper begins publication.
- 1842 - Liège-Guillemins railway station opens.
- 1848 - Avenue Blonden laid out.
- 1850 - Institut archéologique liégeois founded.
- 1853 - Parc de la Boverie established.
- 1856 - Société liégeoise de littérature wallonne (literary society) established.
- 1862 - Bibliothèque populaire communale du Centre (library) opens.
- 1863 - Population: 108,710.
- 1868 - Equestrian statue of Charlemagne unveiled.
- 1871 - Horse-drawn tram begins operating.
- 1875 - Population: 117,600.
- 1877 - Hasselt-Liège railway in operation.
- 1880
  - Montagne de Bueren (stairway) installed in Pierreuse.
  - Parc d'Avroy created.
- 1887 - Salle philharmonique de Liège (concert hall) opens on the Boulevard Piercot.
- 1888 - Construction of area fortifications begins.
- 1889 - La Revue Blanche literary magazine begins publication.
- 1892 - Liège–Bastogne–Liège cycling race begins.
- 1893 - Electric tram begins operating.
- 1898 - Standard Liège football club formed.
- 1900 - Population: 157,760.

== 20th century ==
- 1904 - Pont de Fragnée (bridge) built.
- 1905
  - April: Liège International (1905) world's fair opens.
  - Gare de Liège-Palais (train station) and Passerelle Mativa (footbridge) built.
  - Population: 168,532.
- 1909 - Stade Maurice Dufrasne (stadium) opens.
- 1911
  - Banque Centrale de Liège established.
  - Palace Liège cinema opens.
- 1914 - August: Battle of Liège.
- 1919
  - Simenon's novel Au Pont des Arches published.
  - Population: 166,697.
- 1922 - Forum (Liège) theatre opens.
- 1928 - Interallied Memorial of Cointe erected.
- 1930
  - May: Exposition of 1930 (Liège) world's fair opens.
  - Liège Airport terminal and Pont-barrage de Monsin (bridge) open.
- 1937 - Port of Liège established.
- 1939
  - Albert Canal (Antwerp-Liège) opens.
  - Exposition internationale de l'eau (1939) held.
- 1940 - German occupation of Belgium during World War II begins.
- 1944 - September: German occupation ends.
- 1946 - 17 September: City name changed to "Liège" (formerly "Liége").
- 1950 - Royal Question (political crisis) occurs.
- 1952 - Museum of Fine Arts' Liège Cabinet of Prints and Drawings established.
- 1957 - Albert Bridge, Liège rebuilt.
- 1960
  - 1960–61 Winter General Strike begins.
  - Orchestre Philharmonique de Liège formed.
- 1962 - Musée de zoologie de Liège established.
- 1967
  - Cité administrative (Liège) built.
  - First-generation tram system closed.
- 1976 - Centre culturel Les Chiroux established.
- 1977
  - Angleur, Bressoux, Chênée, Grivegnée, Jupille, Rocourt, and Wandre become part of Liège.
  - RTC-Télé Liège (television) established.
- 1980
  - Musée d'Art Moderne et d'Art Contemporain (Liège) opens.
  - Maison de la science established.
- 1981 - Opera Cinema in business.
- 1985
  - Lawsuit Gravier v City of Liège decided.
  - Musée des transports en commun de Liège founded.
- 1991
  - 18 July: Politician Cools assassinated in Cointe.
  - La Zone music venue opens.
- 1992 - Maison de la métallurgie et de l'industrie museum active.
- 1993
  - La Batte remodelled.
  - Le Churchill cinema opens.
- 1996 - Soundstation cultural space opens.
- 1997 - La Meuse newspaper begins publication.
- 1999 - Willy Demeyer becomes mayor.
- 2000 - Pont du Pays de Liège (bridge) and Tunnel de Cointe open.

== 21st century ==
- 2007
  - Festival international du film policier de Liège begins.
  - Haute École de la Province de Liège (college) established.
- 2008 - Le Sauvenière cinema opens.
- 2009 - Liège-Guillemins railway station rebuilt.
- 2011 - 13 December: 2011 Liège attack occurs on Place Saint-Lambert.
- 2012 - 2012 Tour de France cycling race starts from Liège.
- 2013 - Population: 195,576.
- 2014 - Financial Tower built.

== See also ==
- Liège history
- History of Liège
- List of mayors of Liège
- List of bishops and prince-bishops of Liège
- List of protected heritage sites in Liège
- Timelines of other municipalities in Belgium: Antwerp, Bruges, Brussels, Ghent, Leuven
- History of urban centers in the Low Countries

== Bibliography ==
=== In English ===
- Thomas Nugent (1749), "Liège", The Grand Tour, vol. 1: Netherlands, London: S. Birt, hdl:2027/mdp.39015030762598
- Abraham Rees (1819), "Liege, a city of France", The Cyclopaedia, London: Longman, Hurst, Rees, Orme & Brown, hdl:2027/mdp.39015068382327
- Edmund Boyce (1823). "Liege". Belgian Traveller (4th ed.). London: Samuel Leigh.
- George Henry Townsend (1877), "Liege", A Manual of Dates (5th ed.), London: Frederick Warne & Co., hdl:2027/hvd.32044088047865
- "Liege", Handbook for Travellers in Holland and Belgium (20th ed.), London: John Murray, 1881, hdl:2027/hvd.hn2ha2
- Visitors Universal Handybook and Guide to Antwerp, Brussels, Waterloo, Ghent, Bruges, Liège, etc. etc (5th ed.). Antwerp: John De Wit & Joris. 1884.
- W. Pembroke Fetridge (1885), "Liège", Harper's Hand-Book for Travellers in Europe and the East, New York: Harper & Brothers
- "Liege". Chambers's Encyclopaedia. London. 1901. hdl:2027/uc2.ark:/13960/t7zk5ms79.
- "Liège", Belgium and Holland (15th ed.), Leipzig: Karl Baedeker, 1910, OCLC 397759 + 1881 ed.
- "Liége (city)" . Encyclopædia Britannica. Vol. 16 (11th ed.). 1910. pp. 593–594.
- Benjamin Vincent (1910), "Liège", Haydn's Dictionary of Dates (25th ed.), London: Ward, Lock & Co., hdl:2027/loc.ark:/13960/t89g6g776
- Joseph Brassinne (1913). "Liege". Catholic Encyclopedia. New York.
- Trudy Ring, ed. (1995). "Liege". Northern Europe. International Dictionary of Historic Places. Fitzroy Dearborn. ISBN 978-1-136-63944-9.
- Colum Hourihane, ed. (2012). "Liège". Grove Encyclopedia of Medieval Art and Architecture. Oxford University Press. ISBN 978-0-19-539536-5.

=== In French ===
- Almanach de Liège (in French) circa 1626-1792
- Les Délices du Pays de Liège (in French). Liège. 1738-1744
- X. De Theux, ed. (1867). Bibliographie liégeoise (in French). Brussels: Fr.-J. Olivier.
- "Liège". Dictionnaire Bouillet (in French) (34th ed.). Hachette. 1914. hdl:2027/mdp.39015074817142.
- Jacques Stiennon [in French], ed. (1991). Histoire de Liège (in French). Toulouse.
- Collectif; Auzias, Dominique; Labourdette, Jean-Paul (2015). Liège. Petit Futé (in French). ISBN 978-2-7469-8238-3.
