= List of protected heritage sites in Liège =

This table shows an overview of the protected heritage sites in the Walloon city Liège. This list is part of Belgium's national heritage.

Object	Year/architect	Town/section	Address	Coordinates	Number^{?}	Image
Saint Nicolas Church ^{(nl)} ^{(fr)}		Liège		50.641260°N 5.584549°E	62063-CLT-0001-01 Info	Kerk Saint Nicolas
Church of Saint-Denis ^{(nl)} ^{(fr)}		Liège		50.642925°N 5.574550°E	62063-CLT-0003-01 Info	Kerk Saint-Denis
Church Saint-Antoine ^{(nl)} ^{(fr)}		Liège		50.646793°N 5.576544°E	62063-CLT-0004-01 Info	Kerk Saint-Antoine
Church of St John the Evangelist ^{(nl)} ^{(fr)}		Liège		50.643061°N 5.567306°E	62063-CLT-0005-01 Info	Kerk Saint-Jeanl'Evangéliste
Sainte-Croix Church ^{(nl)} ^{(fr)}		Liège		50.645390°N 5.570099°E	62063-CLT-0006-01 Info	Kerk Sainte-Croix
Church Saint-Christophe ^{(nl)} ^{(fr)}		Liège		50.640040°N 5.566739°E	62063-CLT-0008-01 Info	Kerk Saint-Christophe
Hôtel des Comtes de Mean ^{(nl)} ^{(fr)}		Liège	rue du Mont-Saint-Martin n°s 9 en 11	50.645035°N 5.567867°E	62063-CLT-0009-01 Info	Hôtel des Comtes de Méan
House ^{(nl)} ^{(fr)}		Liège	rue Agimont n°20	50.646244°N 5.567089°E	62063-CLT-0012-01 Info	Huis
Slopes of the Citadel ^{(nl)} ^{(fr)}		Liège		50.653603°N 5.585655°E	62063-CLT-0013-01 Info	Ensemble van de hellingen van de citadel
Renaissance-style remains of the convent of the Sisters of the Hasque, or Val-Sainte Anne ^{(nl)} ^{(fr)}		Liège		50.640784°N 5.574142°E	62063-CLT-0015-01 Info	Gebouw in renaissance-stijl, overblijfsel van het klooster van de Soeurs de Hasque of Val-Sainte Anne
Hôtel, now Curtius Museum ^{(nl)} ^{(fr)}		Liège	Quai de Maestricht n°13	50.647418°N 5.583939°E	62063-CLT-0016-01 Info	Hôtel, tegenwoordig Museum Curtius
Church Saint-Andre ^{(nl)} ^{(fr)}		Liège		50.646066°N 5.575936°E	62063-CLT-0017-01 Info	Kerk Saint-André
Church Saint-Bartholomew ^{(nl)} ^{(fr)}		Liège		50.647920°N 5.582834°E	62063-CLT-0018-01 Info	Kerk Saint-Barthélem
Saint-Gilles: old parts: choir, vestries, tower, courtyard and side chapels ^{(nl)} ^{(fr)}		Liège		50.631370°N 5.547493°E	62063-CLT-0019-01 Info	Kerk Saint-Gilles: oude delen: koor, sacristieën, toren, voorplein en zijkapellen
Old Commandery of the Teutonic Order, called Vieux Joncs ^{(nl)} ^{(fr)}		Liège		50.646859°N 5.573981°E	62063-CLT-0020-01 Info	Oude commanderij van de Teutoonse orde, genaamd Vieux Joncs
St. Martin's Church ^{(nl)} ^{(fr)}		Liège		50.644427°N 5.564144°E	62063-CLT-0021-01 Info	Kerk Saint-Martin
Saint Paul Cathedral ^{(nl)} ^{(fr)}		Liège		50.640263°N 5.571770°E	62063-CLT-0022-01 Info	Kathedraal Saint-Paul
Curtius Museum building expansion ^{(nl)} ^{(fr)}		Liège	Féronstrée n°134	50.647404°N 5.583740°E	62063-CLT-0023-01 Info	Gebouw uitbreiding van Museum Curtius
Old fountain called Tradition ^{(nl)} ^{(fr)}		Liège	place du Marché	50.645846°N 5.576511°E	62063-CLT-0024-01 Info	Monumentale fontein, genaamd Tradition
Old Hotel Sklins ^{(nl)} ^{(fr)}		Liège	rue Hors-Château n°5	50.646987°N 5.577365°E	62063-CLT-0025-01 Info	Oud Hôtel Sklins
Old fountain Perron ^{(nl)} ^{(fr)}		Liège	place du Marché	50.645644°N 5.575651°E	62063-CLT-0026-01 Info	Monumentale fontein van Perron
Classification of the facade of the building at 1 rue de Bex is extended to those on the side of the rue de la Violette and rue de la Grand Tour, as well as the overhanging roof ^{(nl)} ^{(fr)}		Liège		50.645290°N 5.575274°E	62063-CLT-0028-01 Info	Classificatie van de gevel van het gebouw op rue de Bex 1 wordt uitgebreid tot die aan de kant van de rue de la Violette en rue de la Grand Tour, evenals het overhangende dak
Facades of buildings (Town Hall) ^{(nl)} ^{(fr)}		Liège	place du Marché n°2	50.645334°N 5.575248°E	62063-CLT-0029-01 Info	Gevels van gebouw (raadhuis)
Former hospice of the Daughters of the grieving Being, or the incurably sick ^{(nl)} ^{(fr)}		Liège	rue du Vertbois, 13	50.637952°N 5.572408°E	62063-CLT-0030-01 Info	Voormalig hospice van de rouwende Dochters van de Wezen, of van de ongeneeslijk zieken
Old fountain Saint-Jean ^{(nl)} ^{(fr)}		Liège	rue Hors-Château	50.646944°N 5.578088°E	62063-CLT-0031-01 Info	Monumentale fontein Saint-Jean
Church of Saint-Jacques ^{(nl)} ^{(fr)}		Liège		50.636994°N 5.570306°E	62063-CLT-0032-01 Info	Kerk Saint-Jacques
Old meat market ^{(nl)} ^{(fr)}		Liège	rue de la Halle n°1	50.645327°N 5.578209°E	62063-CLT-0035-01 Info	Oude vleeshal
Parts of the Fonck barracks ^{(nl)} ^{(fr)}		Liège	rue Ransonnet	50.644548°N 5.586203°E	62063-CLT-0042-01 Info	
Old pilgrim shelter of the Abbey of Aulne (old part with passage through the entrance gate) ^{(nl)} ^{(fr)}		Liège	Place Saint-Paul n°2	50.640064°N 5.570892°E	62063-CLT-0043-01 Info	Oude toevluchtsoord van de abdij van Aulne (oude gedeelte met doorgang door de ingangsportiek)
Facades and roofs of the building ^{(nl)} ^{(fr)}		Liège	rue Saint-Hubert n°15	50.645044°N 5.569176°E	62063-CLT-0044-01 Info	Gevels en daken van het gebouw
"De Francquen" house and its surroundings ^{(nl)} ^{(fr)}		Liège Burenville	rue Saint-Nicolas n°106A	50.635134°N 5.546115°E	62063-CLT-0045-01 Info	Huis "De Francquen" en het ensemble van het huis en diens omgeving
Some parts of the Prince-Bishops' Palace ^{(nl)} ^{(fr)}		Liège		50.646182°N 5.572862°E	62063-CLT-0049-01 Info	Bepaalde delen van het paleis van de prins-bisschoppen
Old fountain of Virgin ^{(nl)} ^{(fr)}		Liège	rue Vinâve d'Ile	50.641262°N 5.571336°E	62063-CLT-0054-01 Info	Monumentale fontein van Vierge
Old Hôtel de Crassier ^{(nl)} ^{(fr)}		Liège	rue des Célestines n°14	50.641460°N 5.568338°E	62063-CLT-0057-01 Info	Oud Hôtel de Crassiers
Facades and roofs of the ancient sanctuary of Val Benoît ^{(nl)} ^{(fr)}		Liège	rue du Pot d'or n°43	50.641246°N 5.569068°E	62063-CLT-0061-01 Info	Gevels en daken van het oude toevluchtsoord van Val Benoît
The buildings in the courtyard of Prebendiers ^{(nl)} ^{(fr)}		Liège	rue d'Amercoeur n°45	50.635672°N 5.590571°E	62063-CLT-0065-01 Info	
House from the 16th century ^{(nl)} ^{(fr)}		Liège	rue d'Amay n°10	50.641096°N 5.569699°E	62063-CLT-0067-01 Info	Huis uit de 16e eeuw
Hotel ^{(nl)} ^{(fr)}		Liège	Feronstrée n°s 94-96	50.646858°N 5.581042°E	62063-CLT-0069-01 Info	Hotel
Hôtel Torrentius ^{(nl)} ^{(fr)}		Liège	rue Saint-Pierre n° 15 bis	50.645619°N 5.570940°E	62063-CLT-0087-01 Info	Hôtel Torrentius
Avenues of trees along the Ourthe located on the Quai des Ardennes, including the part formerly known as the Quai des Grosses Battes and along the Quai du Condroz and Quai des Vennes ^{(nl)} ^{(fr)}		Liège		50.615402°N 5.600788°E	62063-CLT-0089-01 Info	Lanen van bomen langs de Ourthe gesitueerd op de Quai des Ardennes inclusief het gedeelte voorheen bekend als Quai des Grosses Battes en langs de Quai du Condroz en Quai des Vennes
Hôtel de Soer the Solières ^{(nl)} ^{(fr)}		Liège	rue Haute-Sauvenière n°s 12-14	50.644906°N 5.570308°E	62063-CLT-0092-01 Info	Hôtel de Soer de Solières
Construction in the courtyard of the Museum of Weapons (formerly the Hotel de Hayme Bomal) (at No. 8) and the surrounding wall adjacent to No. 9 and leaning against the fountain ^{(nl)} ^{(fr)}		Liège	Quai de Maestricht 8	50.646896°N 5.583030°E	62063-CLT-0094-02 Info	Declassement van de aanbouw op de binnenplaats van het Museum voor Wapens (voormalig Hôtel de Hayme de Bomal) (op nr 8) en de omliggende muur grenzend aan nr. 9 en leunende tegen de fontein
House: Facade and side wall and gable roofs ^{(nl)} ^{(fr)}		Liège	rue Chéravoie 11	50.642887°N 5.576556°E	62063-CLT-0097-01 Info	Huis: hoofdgevel en zijgevel en daken
Cinema "Le Forum": room and arcade ^{(nl)} ^{(fr)}		Liège		50.641149°N 5.570048°E	62063-CLT-0099-01 Info	
Interior of the academic room, clock room and reading room of the University of Liege ^{(nl)} ^{(fr)}		Liège	Place du XX Août n°20	50.640522°N 5.576209°E	62063-CLT-0100-01 Info	
Extension of the Forum to the front of the building located on rue du Mouton wit with the staircase on the side ^{(nl)} ^{(fr)}		Liège		50.641178°N 5.570337°E	62063-CLT-0101-01 Info	De classificatie als een monument van de ruimte en de veranda van het Forum wordt uitgebreid tot de voorkant van het gebouw gelegen aan rue du Mouton wit en het trappenhuis aan de zijkant
Chapel of Saint-Roch ^{(nl)} ^{(fr)}		Liège	rue Volière	50.647372°N 5.571470°E	62063-CLT-0102-01 Info	Kapel Saint-Roch
Old Benedictine Abbey of Notre-Dame Paix: church vestries and furnishings, walls and roofs of the wing along the boulevard d'Avroy, choir with organ des Dames "Le Picard", and the surrounding wall of the church and the abbey of the Benedictines ^{(nl)} ^{(fr)}		Liège		50.638049°N 5.567284°E	62063-CLT-0103-01 Info	Oude Benedictijnenabdij van Paix Notre-Dame: kerk en sacristieën waaronder meubilair, gevels en daken van de vleugel langs de boulevard d'Avroy, koor des Dames met het orgel "Le Picard", en de omliggende muur en het ensemble vand e kerk, de abdij van de Benedictijnen en het terrein waarop zich deze bevinden
House: façade and roof ^{(nl)} ^{(fr)}		Liège	place Saint-Pholien n°10	50.642755°N 5.579931°E	62063-CLT-0104-01 Info	Huis: voorgevel en dakpaneel
Building: walls and roofs ^{(nl)} ^{(fr)}		Liège	rue Henri de Louvain n° 1	50.669397°N 5.661092°E	62063-CLT-0105-01 Info	Gebouw: gevels en daken
House ^{(nl)} ^{(fr)}		Liège	rue du Jardin Botanique n°34	50.634602°N 5.565191°E	62063-CLT-0106-01 Info	Huis
Hôtel de Bocholtz ^{(nl)} ^{(fr)}		Liège	place Saint-Michel n°s 8-10a	50.645159°N 5.570677°E	62063-CLT-0107-01 Info	Hôtel de Bocholtz
House called Maison Havert ^{(nl)} ^{(fr)}		Liège	quai de la Goffe n° 41	50.645284°N 5.579431°E	62063-CLT-0108-01 Info	Huis, genaamd maison Havert
House: façade and roof ^{(nl)} ^{(fr)}		Liège	rue du Palais n°1	50.646500°N 5.575974°E	62063-CLT-0109-01 Info	Huis: voorgevel en dak
Cour des Mineurs: Building facades ^{(nl)} ^{(fr)}		Liège	rue Moray	50.647122°N 5.575980°E	62063-CLT-0110-01 Info	Gebouwen vormen het Cour des Mineurs: gevels
House: main facade and roof ^{(nl)} ^{(fr)}		Liège	rue Hocheporte n° 3	50.645872°N 5.565703°E	62063-CLT-0111-01 Info	Huis: hoofdgevel en dak
House: plastered ceiling and first floor facade ^{(nl)} ^{(fr)}		Liège	rue Volière n°35	50.647636°N 5.571937°E	62063-CLT-0112-01 Info	Huis: gestukadoord plafond en gevel eerste etage
House: Room on the ground floor ^{(nl)} ^{(fr)}		Liège	rue Hors-Château n°108	50.647613°N 5.580847°E	62063-CLT-0113-01 Info	
House: façades and roofs, including the small building with street-door, stairs, panels and partitions ^{(nl)} ^{(fr)}		Liège	rue Sur-la-Fontaine n°114	50.640126°N 5.567899°E	62063-CLT-0114-01 Info	
Buildings of the Franciscan monastery, now Musée de la Vie Wallonne ^{(nl)} ^{(fr)}		Liège	rue Moray	50.646976°N 5.576215°E	62063-CLT-0115-01 Info	Gebouwen van het klooster van de Minderbroeders, tegenwoordig Musée de la Vie wallonne
Old Post Office ^{(nl)} ^{(fr)}		Liège	rue Saint-Jean Baptiste n°11	50.646247°N 5.580324°E	62063-CLT-0116-01 Info	
Main Building ^{(nl)} ^{(fr)}		Liège	rue Saint Laurent n°9	50.643975°N 5.561998°E	62063-CLT-0117-01 Info	
Building "Tart": street facade and rear, roof, ground floor rooms, central staircase and murals, and the forecourt to the street, the entrance gate, walls, gardens and trees ^{(nl)} ^{(fr)}		Liège	place Saint-Jacques n° 16	50.637325°N 5.569399°E	62063-CLT-0118-01 Info	Gebouw "Tart": straatgevel en achtergevel, dak, kamers op begane grond, centrale trappenhuis en muurschilderingen, en het voorplein aan de straat, de toegangspoort, muren, de tuin en bomen
House: walls and roofs ^{(nl)} ^{(fr)}		Liège	rue Mont-Saint-Martin derrière le n°26	50.645029°N 5.567032°E	62063-CLT-0120-01 Info	Huis: gevels en daken
Presse house: facade and roof, along with the garden, road and wall ^{(nl)} ^{(fr)}		Liège	rue Haute-Sauvenière n°19	50.644939°N 5.569681°E	62063-CLT-0121-01 Info	Huis van Presse: gevel en daken, en het ensemble van het gebouw, de tuin, de weg en de muur
House: walls, roofs and stairs ^{(nl)} ^{(fr)}		Liège	rue des Mineurs n°29-31	50.646493°N 5.576048°E	62063-CLT-0122-01 Info	Huis: gevels, daken en trap
Royal Conservatory of Liège ^{(nl)} ^{(fr)}		Liège	boulevard Piercot n°s 25-29	50.635366°N 5.570613°E	62063-CLT-0123-01 Info	Conservatorium
The two galleries, called Passage Lemonnier (round building facades and roofing) ^{(nl)} ^{(fr)}		Liège		50.642533°N 5.572862°E	62063-CLT-0124-01 Info	De twee galerijen, genaamd Passage Lemonnier (rond gebouw, gevels en dakbedekking)
House: front and totality of the roofs ^{(nl)} ^{(fr)}		Liège	rue G. Thone n°14-16	50.643758°N 5.581610°E	62063-CLT-0125-01 Info	Huis: voorgevel en totaliteit van de daken
Fonts of the church of Sainte-Walburge ^{(nl)} ^{(fr)}		Liège		50.657552°N 5.568942°E	62063-CLT-0126-01 Info	
House: tower, three walls, roof section, and adjoining wall ^{(nl)} ^{(fr)}		Liège	rue Saint-Laurent n°111	50.639532°N 5.557603°E	62063-CLT-0127-01 Info	
House: interior and exterior, and construction: facade and roof ^{(nl)} ^{(fr)}		Liège	rue des Augustins n°33	50.635292°N 5.565683°E	62063-CLT-0128-01 Info	Totaliteit van gebouw Comblen: interieur en exterieur, en aanbouw: gevel en dak
House: façade, roof and staircase from the 18th century ^{(nl)} ^{(fr)}		Liège	Féronstrée n°159	50.647824°N 5.584321°E	62063-CLT-0131-01 Info	
Facade and roof of building, grand auditorium, gable to side, from Institut d'Electricité Montefiore ^{(nl)} ^{(fr)}		Liège	Rue Saint-Gilles 33	50.638940°N 5.567174°E	62063-CLT-0132-01 Info	
House: façade, roofs and stairways from the 18th century ^{(nl)} ^{(fr)}		Liège	rue Hocheporte n° 25	50.646265°N 5.565151°E	62063-CLT-0134-01 Info	Huis: gevel, daken en trappen uit 18e eeuw
Former convent of Récollets: exterior walls, roofs, courtyards, interior corridor of the east wing, with stairs and doors, stairs to the floor ^{(nl)} ^{(fr)}		Liège	rue Georges Simenon n°s 4 tot 11	50.641370°N 5.584638°E	62063-CLT-0137-01 Info	Voormalig klooster van Recollets: buitengevels, daken, binnenplaatsen, interieur corridor van de oostelijke vleugel, met een trap en deur, trap naar de etage
Building of the Association of Engineers of the Montefiore: front, side wall and entrance gates ^{(nl)} ^{(fr)}		Liège		50.639471°N 5.567220°E	62063-CLT-0138-01 Info	
House: façade, roof and cladding ^{(nl)} ^{(fr)}		Liège	rue Fond-Saint-Servais n°20	50.646659°N 5.569359°E	62063-CLT-0139-01 Info	Huis: gevel, dak en bekleding
House: walls, roofs and back stairs, stucco fireplaces, ornate ceilings of the rooms at street level ^{(nl)} ^{(fr)}		Liège	rue Hocheporte n°11	50.646011°N 5.565522°E	62063-CLT-0140-01 Info	Huis: gevels, daken en trapenhuis achterzijde, stucwerk open haarden, versierde plafonds van de kamers op straatniveau
Building: walls and roofs, including construction of north façade ^{(nl)} ^{(fr)}		Liège	rue Fond-Saint-Servais n°16	50.646880°N 5.569611°E	62063-CLT-0141-01 Info	Gebouw: gevels en daken, waaronder noordgevel van aanbouw
House: façade and roof ^{(nl)} ^{(fr)}		Liège	Bergerue n°4	50.642506°N 5.569539°E	62063-CLT-0142-01 Info	Huis: gevel en dak
House: façade and overhanging roof ^{(nl)} ^{(fr)}		Liège	rue Renier Poncelet n°6	50.648975°N 5.585528°E	62063-CLT-0143-01 Info	
House: front, rear, roof, outbuilding at right angles to the back yard and a small low building at the back, inside: staircase with wooden walls, floor of the hall, oak doors, stucco fireplaces with a layer of wood and cast iron arches in the second floor and basement ^{(nl)} ^{(fr)}		Liège	rue Hocheporte n°18	50.646279°N 5.565531°E	62063-CLT-0144-01 Info	Huis: voorgevel, achtergevel, dak, bijgebouw loodrecht op de achterkant, kleine binnenplaats en een laag gebouw aan de achterkant, binnenzijde: trap met houten wanden, vloer van de hal, eiken deuren, stucwerk open haarden met een laag hout en gietijzer bogen in de tweede verdieping en de kelder
Hôtel de Grady: walls and roofs of building ^{(nl)} ^{(fr)}		Liège	rue Saint-Pierre n°13	50.645704°N 5.571155°E	62063-CLT-0145-01 Info	Hôtel de Grady: gevels en daken van hoofdgebouw en aanbouwen
Certain parts of the Grady Hotel ^{(nl)} ^{(fr)}		Liège	rue Saint-Pierre n° 13	50.645673°N 5.571107°E	62063-CLT-0146-01 Info	Bepaalde delen van Hôtel de Grady
House: walls and roofs ^{(nl)} ^{(fr)}		Liège	boulevard Piercot n°40	50.635942°N 5.570150°E	62063-CLT-0147-01 Info	Huis: gevels en daken
House: walls, roofs, courtyard ^{(nl)} ^{(fr)}		Liège	rue Fond-Saint-Servais n°12	50.646774°N 5.569961°E	62063-CLT-0148-01 Info	Huis: gevels, daken, binnenplaats
Hôtel de Copis ^{(nl)} ^{(fr)}		Liège	rue Saint-Etienne n°3	50.643742°N 5.574446°E	62063-CLT-0149-01 Info	Hôtel de Copis
House ^{(nl)} ^{(fr)}		Liège	rue Souverain-Pont n°8	50.644617°N 5.574429°E	62063-CLT-0150-01 Info	Huis
Cirque d'Hiver, a former riding school (roofing and cladding) ^{(nl)} ^{(fr)}		Liège	rue Sur-la-Fontaine n°1	50.642181°N 5.564704°E	62063-CLT-0151-01 Info	Cirque d'Hiver, een voormalige manege (dakbedekking en bekleding)
Remarkable Trees ^{(nl)} ^{(fr)}		Liège	boulevard de la Sauvenière en la place Xavier Neujean	50.643153°N 5.566264°E	62063-CLT-0152-01 Info	Opmerkelijke bomen
House: walls and roofs ^{(nl)} ^{(fr)}		Liège	rue des Mineurs n°25	50.646421°N 5.576145°E	62063-CLT-0153-01 Info	Huis: gevels en daken
House: façade and roof ^{(nl)} ^{(fr)}		Liège	rue Simonon n° 4	50.629026°N 5.565165°E	62063-CLT-0154-01 Info	Huis: gevel en dak
House: façade and roof ^{(nl)} ^{(fr)}		Liège	Feronstrée n°12	50.645923°N 5.577600°E	62063-CLT-0155-01 Info	Huis: gevel en dak
Old convent of Beauregard: walls and roofs of the building from the 17th century, outside wall of the gallery and one tombstone ^{(nl)} ^{(fr)}		Liège	rue Saint-Gilles n° 171	50.637195°N 5.562145°E	62063-CLT-0156-01 Info	Oude klooster van Beauregard: gevels en daken van het gebouw uit de 17e eeuw, buitenmuur van de galerie en grafsteen
House: façade and roof ^{(nl)} ^{(fr)}		Liège	rue de la Rose 18	50.646751°N 5.578184°E	62063-CLT-0157-01 Info	Huis: gevel en dak
House: two street facades and roof ^{(nl)} ^{(fr)}		Liège	op de hoek van rue En Feronstrée n°s 137-139 en de place Saint-Barthélémy n°3	50.647412°N 5.582115°E	62063-CLT-0158-01 Info	Huis: twee straatgevels en totaliteit van het dak
House of Récollets: main front and rear on the rue des Récollets, roofs, stairs from the 18th century ^{(nl)} ^{(fr)}		Liège	rue Fosse-aux-Raines n°12	50.641187°N 5.584014°E	62063-CLT-0159-01 Info	Huis des récollets: hoofdgevel en achtergevel aan de rue des Récollets, daken, trappenhuis uit de 18e eeuw
House: walls and roofs ^{(nl)} ^{(fr)}		Liège	rue Saint-Séverin n° 76	50.645786°N 5.565231°E	62063-CLT-0160-01 Info	
House: façade and roof ^{(nl)} ^{(fr)}		Liège	rue Saint-Gilles n°100	50.638520°N 5.564227°E	62063-CLT-0161-01 Info	
House: façade and roofs ^{(nl)} ^{(fr)}		Liège	rue de Chêvremont n°55	50.612607°N 5.622355°E	62063-CLT-0162-01 Info	
Building: walls and roofs, exterior joinery except on the ground floor and the corner of the loggia ^{(nl)} ^{(fr)}		Liège	rue Puits-en-Sock n°1	50.641341°N 5.582291°E	62063-CLT-0163-01 Info	Gebouw: gevels en daken, uitgezonderd schrijnwerk buitenzijde op de begane grond en de hoek van de loggia
Hôtel de Maître: main: street facade and rear, gable and wood roof, entrance porch, facade and roof of the concierge and supported fountain, certain parts of the interior: grand salon, petit salon, marble fireplace in Regency style, a staircase on the ground floor and an "office" on the first floor ^{(nl)} ^{(fr)}		Liège	Mont-Saint-Martin n°54	50.644680°N 5.565629°E	62063-CLT-0164-01 Info	Hôtel de maître: hoofdgebouw: straatgevel en achtergevel, puntgevel in hout en dak, entreeportiek, voorgevel en dak van de conciergerie en ondersteunde fontein, bepaalde delen van het interieur: grand salon, petit salon, marmeren open haard in Régence-stijl, een trap op de begane grond en een "bureau" op de verdieping
Bridges over the Meuse and Ourthe called Fragnéebridge and Fétinne bridge, and Gramme Square located at the confluence of the Meuse and the Ourthe ^{(nl)} ^{(fr)}		Liège		50.621135°N 5.580536°E	62063-CLT-0165-01 Info	
House: façade and roof ^{(nl)} ^{(fr)}		Liège	rue du Mont-de-Piété n°3-5	50.647300°N 5.584338°E	62063-CLT-0166-01 Info	Huis: straatgevel en dak
Residential: main facade and roof at rear of No. 5 on rue du Mont-de-Piete and parallel to the house on the street ^{(nl)} ^{(fr)}		Liège		50.647322°N 5.584467°E	62063-CLT-0168-01 Info	
House: façade and roof ^{(nl)} ^{(fr)}		Liège	rue Volière n° 31	50.647582°N 5.571842°E	62063-CLT-0177-01 Info	Huis: voorgevel en dak
House: façade, two walls to courtyard ^{(nl)} ^{(fr)}		Liège	rue Volière, n° 47	50.647852°N 5.572257°E	62063-CLT-0178-01 Info	Huis: straatgevel, twee gevels aan binnenplaats
House ^{(nl)} ^{(fr)}		Liège	rue Raes de Heers n°4	50.639303°N 5.584787°E	62063-CLT-0179-01 Info	Huis
Hotel des Postes: walls and roofs ^{(nl)} ^{(fr)}		Liège	rue de la Régence 61, Liège	50.642139°N 5.576225°E	62063-CLT-0181-01 Info	Hôtel des Postes: gevels en daken, en instelling beschermingszone
House: façade and roof ^{(nl)} ^{(fr)}		Liège	rue des Anglais n°34	50.647292°N 5.568821°E	62063-CLT-0182-01 Info	Huis: voorgevel en dak
Gate ^{(nl)} ^{(fr)}		Liège	rue des Anglais, n°36	50.647411°N 5.569223°E	62063-CLT-0183-01 Info	Portaal
Arvo opening in the facade of the building and resulting in an impasse of the Drapers ^{(nl)} ^{(fr)}		Liège	rue Hors-Château n°62	50.647168°N 5.579469°E	62063-CLT-0184-01 Info	
House: main facade ^{(nl)} ^{(fr)}		Liège	rue Saint-Laurent n°66	50.642894°N 5.560032°E	62063-CLT-0186-01 Info	
Greenhouses of the botanical garden as a whole, the facades and roofs of the Institut de pharmacie, facades and roofs of the Institut de Botanique and in the laboratory of botany ^{(nl)} ^{(fr)}		Liège		50.635435°N 5.561909°E	62063-CLT-0188-01 Info	Serres van de botanische tuin in hun geheel, de gevels en daken van het Institut de pharmacie, gevels en daken van het Institut de botanique en binnen het laboratorium van de plantkunde
Botanical garden ^{(nl)} ^{(fr)}		Liège	rue Louvrex	50.633800°N 5.561101°E	62063-CLT-0190-01 Info	Botanische tuin
Chapel of Saint-Augustin of the Hôpital de Bavière, including furnishings ^{(nl)} ^{(fr)}		Liège	rue des Bonnes Villes	50.643437°N 5.588555°E	62063-CLT-0192-01 Info	Totaliteit van de kapel Saint-Augustin van de hôpital de Bavière, waaronder meubilair
Church of Saint-Sacrament ^{(nl)} ^{(fr)}		Liège	boulevard d'Avroy n°132	50.635169°N 5.567121°E	62063-CLT-0194-01 Info	
House: façades and roofs, with the conservatory, wooden windows and doors, both internal and external, iron and copper and the windows, the staircase, original mosaic floors, ceilings of the dining room and conservatory, fireplaces in the atrium, the dining room and the old office on the first floor ^{(nl)} ^{(fr)}		Liège	Rue de Sélys 17	50.630236°N 5.564412°E	62063-CLT-0196-01 Info	Huis: gevels en daken, met de serre, uitgezonderd aanbouw achterzijde, houten ramen en deuren zowel interne als externe, ijzer- en koperwerk en de ramen, de trap, originele mozaïekvloeren, plafonds van de eetkamer en de serre, schouwen van het atrium, de eetkamer en de oude werkkamer op de eerste verdieping
House sign with "Au paradis terrestre": main facade ^{(nl)} ^{(fr)}		Liège	rue Gérardrie n° 25	50.644239°N 5.574171°E	62063-CLT-0197-01 Info	Huis met uithangbord "Au paradis terrestre": hoofdgevel
Zoo and Botanical garden with Park Boverie ^{(nl)} ^{(fr)}		Liège	rue du Parc	50.630879°N 5.574205°E	62063-CLT-0203-01 Info	Dieren- en plantentuin en Park van Boverie
Mansion Quatres tourettes: facades ^{(nl)} ^{(fr)}		Liège	rue Saint-Léonard n° 535	50.654204°N 5.604235°E	62063-CLT-0204-01 Info	Herenhuis van Quatres tourettes: gevels
Bridge over the Wandre ^{(nl)} ^{(fr)}		Liège		50.673129°N 5.644542°E	62063-CLT-0205-01 Info	
Part of 7 to 8 meters from the wall embedded in front of the 16th century, on the right bank of the Meuse, in front of Pont Maghin ^{(nl)} ^{(fr)}		Liège		50.645335°N 5.584622°E	62063-CLT-0207-01 Info	
Site of Pery ^{(nl)} ^{(fr)}		Liège	rue du Péry	50.648250°N 5.574381°E	62063-CLT-0208-01 Info	
Remaining parts of the former hotel of the Stone ^{(nl)} ^{(fr)}		Liège	Mont-Saint-Martin n°s 37-39	50.644562°N 5.566232°E	62063-CLT-0210-01 Info	Resterende delen van het voormalige hotel van den Steen
Extending the classification of the site of Pery, with wide and up the rue du Pery Pierreuse and rue, to the Boulevard de la Citadelle ^{(nl)} ^{(fr)}		Liège		50.650706°N 5.574887°E	62063-CLT-0213-01 Info	
Tower "Rosen" ^{(nl)} ^{(fr)}		Liège	rue Bovy n°19	50.624343°N 5.569138°E	62063-CLT-0214-01 Info	Toren "Rosen"
Gebouw Troisfontaines ^{(nl)} ^{(fr)}		Liège	quai de la Batte n° 1	50.645401°N 5.579546°E	62063-CLT-0217-01 Info	Gebouw Troisfontaines
Fabry farmhoude and its surroundings ^{(nl)} ^{(fr)}		Liège	rue des Glacis	50.655063°N 5.586391°E	62063-CLT-0218-01 Info	
House "Baar-Lecharlier": facades, roofs and cladding ^{(nl)} ^{(fr)}		Liège	place Saint-Denis n°3	50.643517°N 5.574244°E	62063-CLT-0219-01 Info	Huis "Baar-Lecharlier": gevels, daken en bekleding
War Memorial of the First Regiment de Ligne, the old barracks of the Chartreuse ^{(nl)} ^{(fr)}		Liège		50.632807°N 5.596792°E	62063-CLT-0220-01 Info	
The altar, the cross and the memorial of Bastion des Fusillés on the site of the Chartruese barracks ^{(nl)} ^{(fr)}		Liège		50.633207°N 5.601838°E	62063-CLT-0221-01 Info	Het altaar, het kruis en het monument van Bastion des Fusillés op de site van de kazerne van de Chartreuse en het ensemble van zone A1 van de site van de kazerne van de Chartreuse
Site of Vieux-Jupille ^{(nl)} ^{(fr)}		Liège		50.646482°N 5.631215°E	62063-CLT-0223-01 Info	
Site of Chartreuse, which part of the site is already classified by on January 13, 1989) and the park of the Oblates ^{(nl)} ^{(fr)}		Liège		50.634644°N 5.602694°E	62063-CLT-0224-01 Info	Site van Chartreuse, welk deel van de site al is ingedeeld per van 13 januari 1989) en het park van de Oblats
Site of the castle and park Kinkempois ^{(nl)} ^{(fr)}		Liège		50.612663°N 5.584920°E	62063-CLT-0225-01 Info	Site van het kasteel en park van Kinkempois
House: walls and roofs ^{(nl)} ^{(fr)}		Liège	rue de la Goffe n°20	50.645110°N 5.578083°E	62063-CLT-0227-01 Info	Huis: gevels en daken
Old parts of the Pompiers barracks (fire-fighters) ^{(nl)} ^{(fr)}		Liège	Montagne de Bueren n°2	50.647488°N 5.578413°E	62063-CLT-0228-01 Info	Oude delen van de kazerne van pompiers
Five atlas cedar trees ^{(nl)} ^{(fr)}		Liège	chemin des Cèdres en avenue de Gerlache	50.614926°N 5.571075°E	62063-CLT-0229-01 Info	
House ^{(nl)} ^{(fr)}		Liège	rue Basse-Sauvenière n°27	50.644425°N 5.568927°E	62063-CLT-0230-01 Info	
Purple beech and linden trees ^{(nl)} ^{(fr)}		Liège	rue Louvrex en rue des Augustins	50.636416°N 5.564009°E	62063-CLT-0231-01 Info	
House: façade to the garden, roofs, murals on the ground floor, wooden panels of the 18th century, stage ^{(nl)} ^{(fr)}		Liège	Montagne de Bueren n°41	50.648587°N 5.576768°E	62063-CLT-0234-01 Info	
Lohest building ^{(nl)} ^{(fr)}		Liège	rue Sainte-Croix n°4	50.645699°N 5.570316°E	62063-CLT-0236-01 Info	Gebouw Lohest
16th century "Vieille Ferme" house, also called "Paix d'Angleur" ^{(nl)} ^{(fr)}		Liège	rue Ovide Decroly n° 59	50.611414°N 5.595976°E	62063-CLT-0238-01 Info	Gebouw uit de 16e eeuw, genaamd "Vieille Ferme", de zogenaamde Paix d'Angleur
House ^{(nl)} ^{(fr)}		Liège	rue Fond Saint-Servais n°18	50.646642°N 5.569527°E	62063-CLT-0241-01 Info	Huis
Hotel (facade, roof, wooden stairs), surrounding wall and portal ^{(nl)} ^{(fr)}		Liège	rue Basse-Sauvenière n°47	50.644338°N 5.567763°E	62063-CLT-0243-01 Info	
House: walls and roof ^{(nl)} ^{(fr)}		Liège	rue Pierreuse, n°7	50.646705°N 5.573457°E	62063-CLT-0244-01 Info	Huis: gevels en dak
Chapel of Saint-Maur ^{(nl)} ^{(fr)}		Liège	rue Saint-Maur	50.619792°N 5.566793°E	62063-CLT-0245-01 Info	
Payenporte enclosed wall ^{(nl)} ^{(fr)}		Liège	rue Vivegnis	50.651141°N 5.582155°E	62063-CLT-0246-01 Info	
Bunkers and wells of Citadel of Liège ^{(nl)} ^{(fr)}		Liège		50.650739°N 5.577648°E	62063-CLT-0247-01 Info	
House: façade and roofs ^{(nl)} ^{(fr)}		Liège	place de Bronckart n°1	50.629835°N 5.565431°E	62063-CLT-0249-01 Info	Huis: straatgevel en daken
Remains of bastions and corresponding curtain walls of the ancient Citadel of Liège ^{(nl)} ^{(fr)}		Liège		50.650740°N 5.577142°E	62063-CLT-0251-01 Info	Overblijfselen van bastions en courtines van de oude citadel van Liège
House ^{(nl)} ^{(fr)}		Liège	rue des Mârets n°s 6-8	50.669069°N 5.660665°E	62063-CLT-0252-01 Info	
Remarkable trees in the courtyard of Institut des Sourd-Muets: plane, maple, ash, beech, and linden. ^{(nl)} ^{(fr)}		Liège	rue Monulphe	50.640434°N 5.559251°E	62063-CLT-0253-01 Info	
House: façades and roofs, except the gable to rue Core Molin ^{(nl)} ^{(fr)}		Liège	rue Sainte-Marguerite n°12-18	50.645741°N 5.562665°E	62063-CLT-0254-01 Info	Huis: gevels en daken, uitgezonderd de puntgevel aan rue Corémolin
House: façade and roof ^{(nl)} ^{(fr)}		Liège	rue Saint-Thomas n°28	50.648244°N 5.583722°E	62063-CLT-0255-01 Info	
House: façade and roof ^{(nl)} ^{(fr)}		Liège	rue Saint-Thomas n°18	50.648043°N 5.583913°E	62063-CLT-0256-01 Info	Huis: gevel en dak
House: façade and roof ^{(nl)} ^{(fr)}		Liège	rue des Tanneurs n°39	50.645017°N 5.583967°E	62063-CLT-0258-01 Info	Huis: gevel en dak
Stations of the Cross called "Li vi Bodju" built into the wall along the C Lot 439 ^{(nl)} ^{(fr)}		Liège	rue Pierreuse	50.649858°N 5.573158°E	62063-CLT-0259-01 Info	
House: façade and roof ^{(nl)} ^{(fr)}		Liège	rue du Palais n°18	50.646618°N 5.575417°E	62063-CLT-0260-01 Info	Huis: gevel en dak
House: walls and roofs ^{(nl)} ^{(fr)}		Liège	rue Agimont n°26	50.646304°N 5.566408°E	62063-CLT-0261-01 Info	Huis: gevels en daken
House: façade and roof ^{(nl)} ^{(fr)}		Liège	rue du Palais n°8	50.646627°N 5.575719°E	62063-CLT-0262-01 Info	Huis: gevel en dak
House "A l'Anneau d'Or 1754": facade and roof ^{(nl)} ^{(fr)}		Liège	rue Donceel n°10	50.642637°N 5.574180°E	62063-CLT-0263-01 Info	Huis "A l'Anneau d'Or 1754": gevel en dak
House: façade and roof ^{(nl)} ^{(fr)}		Liège	rue du Palais n°44	50.646656°N 5.574840°E	62063-CLT-0264-01 Info	Huis: gevel en dak
House: façade and roof ^{(nl)} ^{(fr)}		Liège	rue Hocheporte n°9	50.645972°N 5.565591°E	62063-CLT-0265-01 Info	Huis: gevel en dak
House: façade and roof ^{(nl)} ^{(fr)}		Liège	rue du Palais n°56	50.646651°N 5.574399°E	62063-CLT-0266-01 Info	Huis: gevel en dak
House: façade and roof ^{(nl)} ^{(fr)}		Liège	rue Hocheporte n°24	50.646441°N 5.565365°E	62063-CLT-0267-01 Info	Huis: gevel en dak
Urban architecture of Naimette, Hocheporte and Xhovémont ^{(nl)} ^{(fr)}		Liège		50.649542°N 5.561562°E	62063-CLT-0268-01 Info	
House: façade and roof ^{(nl)} ^{(fr)}		Liège	rue Sainte-Marguerite n°247	50.647256°N 5.554797°E	62063-CLT-0269-01 Info	
House: façade and roof ^{(nl)} ^{(fr)}		Liège	rue Sainte-Marguerite n°325	50.647720°N 5.552217°E	62063-CLT-0270-01 Info	
House: façade and roof ^{(nl)} ^{(fr)}		Liège	rue Sainte-Marguerite n° 110-112-114	50.646127°N 5.560118°E	62063-CLT-0272-01 Info	Huis: gevel en dak
îlot Sainte-Croix ^{(nl)} ^{(fr)}		Liège		50.645765°N 5.571279°E	62063-CLT-0273-02 Info	Declassificatie van een deel van het îlot Sainte-Croix
Rectory of the church of Saint-Jacques: walls, roof, lounge decorated with paintings, stucco office on the ground floor ^{(nl)} ^{(fr)}		Liège	place Saint-Jacques n°8	50.637724°N 5.569468°E	62063-CLT-0275-01 Info	Pastorie van de kerk Saint-Jacques: gevels, dak, lounge ingericht met schilderijen, stucwerk in kantoor op de begane grond
Farmhouse Vache: walls, ceilings and cloister corridor ^{(nl)} ^{(fr)}		Liège	rue Pierreuse n°s 113-115	50.649152°N 5.572816°E	62063-CLT-0276-01 Info	
Hotel Clercx: walls, roofs, stairs, the entire interior and cellars ^{(nl)} ^{(fr)}		Liège	rue Saint-Paul n°s 27-29-31	50.639957°N 5.573232°E	62063-CLT-0277-01 Info	
Place de Bronckart ^{(nl)} ^{(fr)}		Liège		50.629667°N 5.564530°E	62063-CLT-0278-01 Info	Place de Bronckart
Gravestone of Doctor Jean-Pierre Paul Bovy, in the cemetery of Diguette ^{(nl)} ^{(fr)}		Liège		50.609313°N 5.603703°E	62063-CLT-0279-01 Info	
Castle Colonster: exterior walls, roofs, attics, interiors, two towers in the southwest and northwest, wrought iron gates and pillars of the 18th century of the wing, Leda lounge, library and living green ^{(nl)} ^{(fr)}		Liège	rue de Colonster, 45	50.579053°N 5.596012°E	62063-CLT-0280-01 Info	
Monastery farm of the Carthusians ^{(nl)} ^{(fr)}		Liège	thier de la Chartreuse n°s 45-47	50.633882°N 5.594254°E	62063-CLT-0281-01 Info	
House: façade ^{(nl)} ^{(fr)}		Liège	rue Fond-Saint-Servais n°24	50.646629°N 5.569236°E	62063-CLT-0284-01 Info	Huis: voorgevel
Site of Bernalmont ^{(nl)} ^{(fr)}		Liège	rue des Petites Roches	50.661895°N 5.608159°E	62063-CLT-0285-01 Info	
Castle Colonster and its surroundings ^{(nl)} ^{(fr)}		Liège		50.576954°N 5.590567°E	62063-CLT-0286-01 Info	Ensemble van het kasteel van Colonster en diens omgeving
Site of Fond-Saint-Servais/Volière ^{(nl)} ^{(fr)}		Liège		50.647934°N 5.572550°E	62063-CLT-0287-01 Info	
Castle Fayembois ^{(nl)} ^{(fr)}		Liège		50.631193°N 5.641614°E	62063-CLT-0288-01 Info	
Domain Fayembois and the surrounding area ^{(nl)} ^{(fr)}		Liège		50.632356°N 5.634097°E	62063-CLT-0291-01 Info	
Notre-Dame church ^{(nl)} ^{(fr)}		Liège	Xhavée, Wandre	50.661595°N 5.663761°E	62063-CLT-0292-01 Info	Kerk Notre-Dame
House: walls, roof and metal staircase from the main building from the 17th century, rebuilt in the 19th century, and the linden tree in the courtyard ^{(nl)} ^{(fr)}		Liège	rue Bonne Fortune, n°9	50.639701°N 5.572413°E	62063-CLT-0293-01 Info	
Place Saint-Paul ^{(nl)} ^{(fr)}		Liège	Liège	50.640400°N 5.572323°E	62063-CLT-0294-01 Info	Place Saint-Paul
Building: facade and roof ^{(nl)} ^{(fr)}		Liège	rue du Palais n°58	50.646666°N 5.574275°E	62063-CLT-0295-01 Info	Gebouw: gevel en dak
The rear building and the adjacent high wooden and brick barn (19th century), the four bays on the front right side and the low roof of the extension and vertical extension (18th century) ^{(nl)} ^{(fr)}		Liège		50.646787°N 5.574156°E	62063-CLT-0296-01 Info	
Drawbridge on the channel of the Ourthe and stonework along it, towards the dock and the canal, and the lock giving access to the channel of the Ourthe, and two stonelined gates ^{(nl)} ^{(fr)}		Liège	rue Joseph Marcotty	50.619269°N 5.581763°E	62063-CLT-0298-01 Info	
House: façade and roof ^{(nl)} ^{(fr)}		Liège	rue Sainte-Marguerite n°100	50.645696°N 5.560151°E	62063-CLT-0300-01 Info	Huis: gevel en dak
House: façade and roof ^{(nl)} ^{(fr)}		Liège	rue Grandgagnage n°12	50.638553°N 5.562116°E	62063-CLT-0302-01 Info	Huis: gevel en dak
The trees on the island between the roads rue Cesar Franck, and rue Wazon Monulphe, except for two cherry trees on plots 4 and 6 z 2 i 3 numbered 5 and 24 and two hazelnut trees on the lot 4 z 2, number 6, and 7. ^{(nl)} ^{(fr)}		Liège	Liège	50.639818°N 5.560117°E	62063-CLT-0303-01 Info	
House: walls and roof ^{(nl)} ^{(fr)}		Liège	rue Saint-Séverin n° 102	50.645669°N 5.564712°E	62063-CLT-0304-01 Info	Huis: gevels en dak
Beaumont Castle, and its surroundings ^{(nl)} ^{(fr)}		Liège	rue Côte d'Or n° 293	50.612381°N 5.567627°E	62063-CLT-0305-01 Info	Kasteel van Beaumont, en het ensemble van het kasteel en diens omgeving
Hospice called Balloir St. Barbe: walls and roofs ^{(nl)} ^{(fr)}		Liège	place Sainte-Barbe n°11	50.645298°N 5.585198°E	62063-CLT-0306-01 Info	
House: facade and roof and a gable of the 17th century rue des Récollets ^{(nl)} ^{(fr)}		Liège	rue Puits-en-stock n°23	50.640863°N 5.582890°E	62063-CLT-0307-01 Info	Huis: voorgevel en dak, en een puntgevel uit de 17e eeuw aan rue des Récollets
Organs of the church of Saint-Remacle ^{(nl)} ^{(fr)}		Liège		50.637032°N 5.589497°E	62063-CLT-0310-01 Info	
Grand Magasin "Le Grand Bazar": facade ^{(nl)} ^{(fr)}		Liège	place Saint-Lambert n°s 23-25	50.644530°N 5.573434°E	62063-CLT-0311-01 Info	Grand Magasin "le Grand Bazar": voorgevel
Building: facade and roof ^{(nl)} ^{(fr)}		Liège	rue du Palais 3	50.646507°N 5.576007°E	62063-CLT-0313-01 Info	Gebouw: gevel en dak
House: front, rear corner of the street on Rue Bonne Fortune, roofs ^{(nl)} ^{(fr)}		Liège	rue Saint-Paul n°8	50.640058°N 5.572643°E	62063-CLT-0315-01 Info	Huis: gevel, achtergevel op hoek van de straat rue Bonne-Fortune, daken
Some parts of the building ^{(nl)} ^{(fr)}		Liège	rue Agimont n° 24	50.646184°N 5.566817°E	62063-CLT-0316-01 Info	Bepaalde delen van het gebouw
Athenee Léonie de Waha ^{(nl)} ^{(fr)}		Liège	boulevard d'Avroy n°96	50.636232°N 5.567394°E	62063-CLT-0317-01 Info	Athénée Léonie de Waha
House: façade and roof ^{(nl)} ^{(fr)}		Liège	rue Souverain-Pont n°15	50.644208°N 5.574926°E	62063-CLT-0318-01 Info	Huis: straatgevel en dak
Second arch of the Pont des Arches, built in the eleventh century on the river Meuse, located in the basement of No. 2 of the impasse du Vieux Pont des Arches ^{(nl)} ^{(fr)}		Liège		50.644411°N 5.578104°E	62063-CLT-0319-01 Info	Tweede boog van de Pont des Arches, gebouwd in de elfde eeuw aan de rivier de Maas, gelegen in de kelder van nr. 2 van de impasse du Vieux Pont des Arches
House: façade and roof ^{(nl)} ^{(fr)}		Liège	rue Souverain-Pont n°10	50.644555°N 5.574460°E	62063-CLT-0321-01 Info	Huis: straatgevel en dak
House building "Tchantchès" ^{(nl)} ^{(fr)}		Liège	rue Grande-Bèche n°35	50.640459°N 5.580924°E	62063-CLT-0322-01 Info	Huis, gebouw "Tchantchès"
Organs of the Church of St. Francis of Sales (demolished) ^{(nl)} ^{(fr)}		Liège		50.629742°N 5.558528°E	62063-CLT-0323-01 Info	
Facade and roof of the house ^{(nl)} ^{(fr)}		Liège	achter n° 6 van rue Saint-Paul	50.640167°N 5.572359°E	62063-CLT-0324-01 Info	Gevel en dak van het huis
House: façade and roof ^{(nl)} ^{(fr)}		Liège	rue Souverain-Pont n°28	50.644091°N 5.574757°E	62063-CLT-0325-01 Info	Huis: straatgevel en dak
Building: façade and roof ^{(nl)} ^{(fr)}		Liège	rue du Souverain-Pont n°24	50.644201°N 5.574680°E	62063-CLT-0326-01 Info	Gebouw: straatgevel en dak
Building of the Literary Society: front facade and roof ^{(nl)} ^{(fr)}		Liège	place de la République française n°5	50.643792°N 5.572262°E	62063-CLT-0327-01 Info	Gebouw van de Société Littéraire: gevel en voorzijde dak
House: façade and roof ^{(nl)} ^{(fr)}		Liège	rue Pont d'Ile n°51	50.642309°N 5.571161°E	62063-CLT-0328-01 Info	Huis: gevel en dak
Société Littéraire: rooms on the first floor at the front, the wardrobe of the hall and the staircase and lobby of the Literary Society ^{(nl)} ^{(fr)}		Liège		50.643722°N 5.572272°E	62063-CLT-0329-01 Info	De kamers op de 1e etage aan de voorzijde, de garderobe van de hal en het ensemble van de trap en de lobby van het gebouw van het Société Littéraire (Literair Genootschap)
Rear of the roof of the building Literary Society ^{(nl)} ^{(fr)}		Liège		50.643809°N 5.572448°E	62063-CLT-0330-01 Info	Achterzijde van het dak van het gebouw van Société Littéraire
House: walls and roofs ^{(nl)} ^{(fr)}		Liège	rue Souverain-Pont n°7	50.644490°N 5.574815°E	62063-CLT-0331-01 Info	Huis: gevels en daken
Building: façade and roof ^{(nl)} ^{(fr)}		Liège	rue Souverain-Pont n°12	50.644505°N 5.574465°E	62063-CLT-0332-01 Info	Gebouw: straatgevel en dak
House: façade and roof ^{(nl)} ^{(fr)}		Liège	rue Souverain-Pont n°13	50.644276°N 5.574875°E	62063-CLT-0333-01 Info	Huis: straatgevel en dak
Houses: street facades and roofs ^{(nl)} ^{(fr)}		Liège	rue Souverain-Pont n°s 9-11 en 11A	50.644355°N 5.574805°E	62063-CLT-0335-01 Info	Huizen: straatgevels en daken
Arvo ^{(nl)} ^{(fr)}		Liège	Thier de la Chartreuse	50.633518°N 5.594340°E	62063-CLT-0337-01 Info	Arvo
Clerinx organ, pulpit and lectern other church Sainte-Catherine ^{(nl)} ^{(fr)}		Liège		50.644606°N 5.577240°E	62063-CLT-0338-01 Info	Orgel Clerinx, oksaal en spreekgestoelte an de kerk Sainte-Catherine
House: walls and roofs ^{(nl)} ^{(fr)}		Liège	rue Agimont, n°22	50.646226°N 5.566960°E	62063-CLT-0340-01 Info	Huis: gevels en daken
Building: façade and roofs ^{(nl)} ^{(fr)}		Liège	rue Leopold n°40	50.644048°N 5.576822°E	62063-CLT-0341-01 Info	Gebouw: straatgevel en daken
House "Au Moriane": front gable and roof ^{(nl)} ^{(fr)}		Liège	En Neuvice n°55	50.644680°N 5.577443°E	62063-CLT-0342-01 Info	Huis "Au Moriane": gevel en voorzijde dak
Setting protection around the Place Saint-Lambert and environment ^{(nl)} ^{(fr)}		Liège	Liège	50.647846°N 5.572925°E	62063-CLT-0345-01 Info	Instelling beschermingszone rond de place Saint-Lambert en omgeving
Cemetery Robermont ^{(nl)} ^{(fr)}		Liège	rue de Robermont	50.633508°N 5.605369°E	62063-CLT-0346-01 Info	Begraafplaats van Robermont
Urban site rue Bonne Fortune ^{(nl)} ^{(fr)}		Liège		50.640295°N 5.572238°E	62063-CLT-0347-01 Info	Stedelijke site van rue Bonne Fortune
Old parts of the church of the Carmelite Monastery of Cornillon: apse, two bays of the chancel, tower and chapel ^{(nl)} ^{(fr)}		Liège	rue de Robermont n°2	50.635146°N 5.592591°E	62063-CLT-0348-01 Info	
Hotel "Brahy": facade and roof ^{(nl)} ^{(fr)}		Liège	En Feronstrée n°132	50.647341°N 5.583550°E	62063-CLT-0349-01 Info	Hôtel "Brahy": gevel en dak
Street facade and roof, the promenade on the ground floor, the staircase and the auditorium of the Société libre d'Emulation, setting protection around the place du XX Août, and the facades of the buildings which borders ^{(nl)} ^{(fr)}		Liège	Place du XX Août 16	50.640677°N 5.574771°E	62063-CLT-0350-01 Info	Straatgevel en dak, de promenade op de begane grond, het trappenhuis en het auditorium van de société libre d'Emulation, instelling beschermingszone rondom het place du XX Août en de gevels van de gebouwen die er aan grenzen
Seminary Church, formerly of the Premonstratensian ^{(nl)} ^{(fr)}		Liège		50.637361°N 5.573884°E	62063-CLT-0351-01 Info	Seminariekerk, voorheen van de premonstratenzer
Buildings and body protection ^{(nl)} ^{(fr)}		Liège	rue Raikem n°s 3, 5, 9, 11, 13, 15, 17, 19, 21, 6, 8, 10, 12, 14, 16, 18 en 20	50.630886°N 5.570168°E	62063-CLT-0352-01 Info	
Favechamps site consisting of an orchard and a wooded area ^{(nl)} ^{(fr)}		Liège		50.649559°N 5.569487°E	62063-CLT-0353-01 Info	Site van Favechamps bestaand uit een hoogstamboomgaard en een bosrijk terrein
Cybernetique tour and the physical components and lightshow "Formes et Lumieres" ^{(nl)} ^{(fr)}		Liège		50.628962°N 5.574876°E	62063-CLT-0354-01 Info	Tour cybernétique en de fysieke componenten en realisatie lichtenspel "Formes et lumières"
Buildings: main facade and roof ^{(nl)} ^{(fr)}		Liège	rue d'Artois 42 en 44	50.627508°N 5.566382°E	62063-CLT-0355-01 Info	Gebouwen: hoofdgevel en dak, instelling beschermingszone
House of the Chaplain ^{(nl)} ^{(fr)}		Liège	Jupille-sur-Meuse	50.646905°N 5.632685°E	62063-CLT-0356-01 Info	
Church Saint-Pierre ^{(nl)} ^{(fr)}		Liège	Chênée	50.611038°N 5.619412°E	62063-CLT-0357-01 Info	
Vaulted cellars ^{(nl)} ^{(fr)}		Liège	rue Saint-Hubert 45	50.645042°N 5.568818°E	62063-CLT-0358-01 Info	
Villa l'Aube by Gustave Serrurier - Bovy and the garden gate ^{(nl)} ^{(fr)}		Liège	avenue de Cointe n°2	50.616519°N 5.563764°E	62063-CLT-0360-01 Info	
Rectory, the church and the surrounding areas ^{(nl)} ^{(fr)}		Liège	Chênée	50.610761°N 5.619590°E	62063-CLT-0361-01 Info	
Royal Theatre (except furniture, technical rooms, floors, walls and enclosing walls of the room and the boxes) and the monument Grétry (except flowers and conclusion). Setting conservation limits by the facade of the theater and the small park surrounding the monument Grétry ^{(nl)} ^{(fr)}		Liège		50.643358°N 5.570410°E	62063-CLT-0362-01 Info	Koninklijk Theater (uitgezonderd meubilair, technische ruimtes, vloeren, wanden en omsluitende muren van de ruimte en de loges) en het monument Grétry (met uitzondering van bloemen en sluiting). Instelling beschermingszone beperkt door de voorgevel van het theater en het kleine park rondom het monument Grétry
Protection area around Saint-Pierre church ^{(nl)} ^{(fr)}		Liège	Chênée	50.611395°N 5.619701°E	62063-CLT-0363-01 Info	Beschermingszone rondom kerk Saint-Pierre
The cup of loess (La Coupe de Loess') ^{(nl)} ^{(fr)}		Liège	Rocourt	50.668144°N 5.561844°E	62063-CLT-0364-01 Info	
Rectory of the church Saint-Pierre ^{(nl)} ^{(fr)}		Liège	Chenée	50.610710°N 5.619168°E	62063-CLT-0365-01 Info	
House: including the medieval cellar ^{(nl)} ^{(fr)}		Liège	rue Pierreuse n°8, rue Pierreuse n°10 en 12	50.646799°N 5.573726°E	62063-CLT-0368-01 Info	Huis: inclusief de middeleeuwse kelder
Purple Beech ^{(nl)} ^{(fr)}		Liège	rue des Rivageois n°6	50.623772°N 5.574191°E	62063-CLT-0369-01 Info	
Birthplace of Eugene Ysaye: facade and roof ^{(nl)} ^{(fr)}		Liège	rue Sainte-Marguerite n°231	50.647187°N 5.555382°E	62063-CLT-0372-01 Info	
Interallied Memorial of Cointe ^{(nl)} ^{(fr)}	1928 Joseph Smolderen	Liège	rue des Hirondelles	50.6198°N 5.5694°E	62063-CLT-0430-01 Info	Monument voor de intergeallieerden

== See also ==
- List of protected heritage sites in Liège (province)
- Liège
