= La Zone =

- Interactive map of La Zone
- Location: Quai de l'Ourthe, 42 Liège
- Capacity: 200

Construction
- Opened: 1991

Website
- www.lazone.be

La Zone is a music venue for alternative and underground music in Liège, Belgium 50.637411°N 5.580325°E. It's located in Outremeuse, the island in the middle of Liège and is hosting a wide variety of musical bands from everywhere in the world, as well as theatre, exhibitions, workshops.

With a capacity of 200 people, La Zone has operated as a music venue since its establishment. The venue offers admission at various prices and has hosted a range of musical performances and events throughout its history.

The facility offers a wide range of musical styles from hardcore punk to ethno jazz. In fact, La Zone is only responsible for 1/5 of the annual 60 gigs, as the rest is programmed by outside collectives, making La Zone a place of public interest which can be used by any alternative collective looking for a venue for its gigs.

La Zone has become the regular headquarters of a number of different associations, most of which have different means of promotion. It also distributes CDs, records, and magazines for those groups which do not have commercial promotion and prefer to do it themselves (DIY ) and retain control of their own releases. It was the home venue of Hiatus.

Many side projects exist, such as their file on SABAM (the Belgian Author's Rights Society), an annual short films festival and a monthly Slam scene.

== See also ==
- List of concert halls
