= Six hundred Franchimontois =

600 Franchimontois
- Part of the Third Liège War
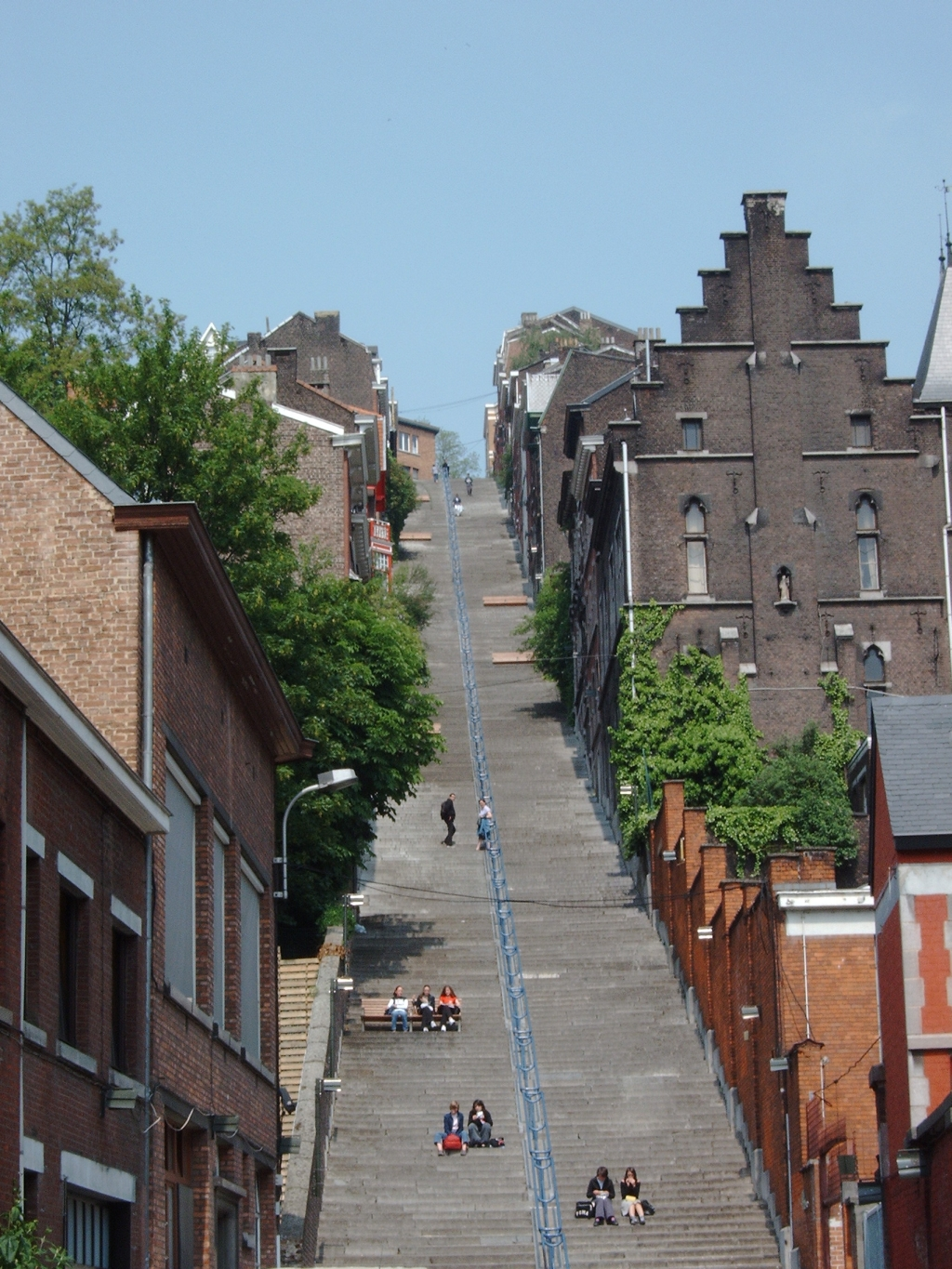
- The Montagne de Bueren in Liège
Date	October 29, 1468
Location	Liège, Prince-Bishopric of Liège
Result	Burgundian victory

Belligerents
Burgundian State	Prince-Bishopric of Liège: Marquessate of Franchimont

Commanders and leaders
Charles the Bold; Louis XI	Vincent de Bueren †; Gosuin de Streel †

Strength
Unknown	600 men

Casualties and losses
Unknown	600 killed

On the night of 29 October 1468 during the Siege of Liège, some six hundred Franchimontois, men from Franchimont, unsuccessfully attacked the besieging Burgundian army, with the aim of killing or capturing its leaders, Duke Charles the Bold and King Louis XI.

== Background and fighting ==
In 1468, the citizens of Liège rose up against Burgundian domination for the third time in four years. As a reaction, Charles the Bold had led an army towards Liège to deal once and for all with the rebellious city. He was accompanied by King Louis XI of France. When the siege became desperate for the Liégeois, they decided to make a night attack with 600 men, led by Vincent de Bueren and Gosuin de Streel, over the Saint Walburga stairs against the sleeping Burgundians. Their aim was to kill the Duke and the King, so that the army would be left leaderless and retreat.

The plan failed, and all 600, including Vincent de Bueren and Gosuin de Streel, were killed. The Saint Walburga stairs were later renamed the "Bueren stairs". The next day Liège surrendered, and at the command of Charles the Bold, hundreds of Liégeois were tied together and thrown into the Meuse river. The city was set alight and is said to have burned for seven weeks.

== In subsequent mythology ==
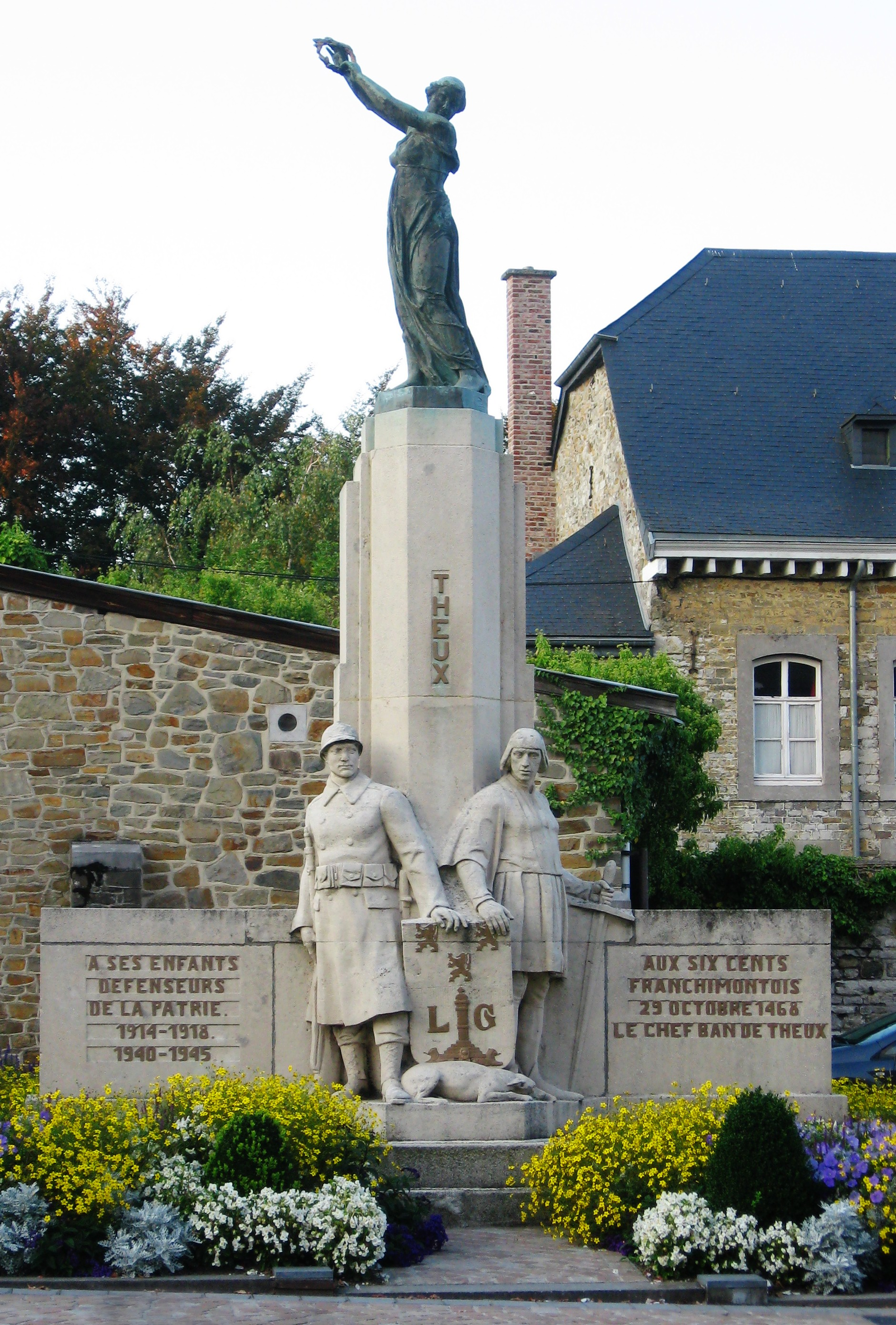
War Memorial from Theux, dedicated to both the Belgian war dead of World War I and the 600 Franchimontois

The story of the 600 Franchimontois has come to us through the chronicler Philippe de Commines, who was present in the Burgundian camp at the Siege of Liège.

It is difficult to know the true history behind the story of the 600 Franchimontois, because it has been used since 1831 by the newly independent Kingdom of Belgium as an example of self-sacrifice for the fatherland and of resistance against any invader, no matter how powerful he might be.

The story of the 600 Franchimontois was told in every Belgian school. After the German invasion of Belgium in 1914, King Albert I of Belgium appealed to his soldiers to resist the powerful German war-machine using the phrase: "Flemings, remember the Battle of the Golden Spurs, Walloons, remember the 600 Franchimontois!".

When the French Community of Belgium was created, the day of the battle, October 29 was considered as a French Community Holiday.

All of this makes it very difficult to distinguish truth from fiction. Recent historians have established that the attack did not go over the Bueren stairs, but through the Saint Margaret gate. The number of 600 men is probably also greatly exaggerated and there are even doubts that the men came from Franchimont.

== Bibliography ==
- "L'épopée des 600 Franchimontois..." La Libre Belgique. 27 May 2010.
