= Fort de la Chartreuse =

19th century fortification for Liège, Belgium

- Part of Fortified Position of Liège
- Liège, Belgium
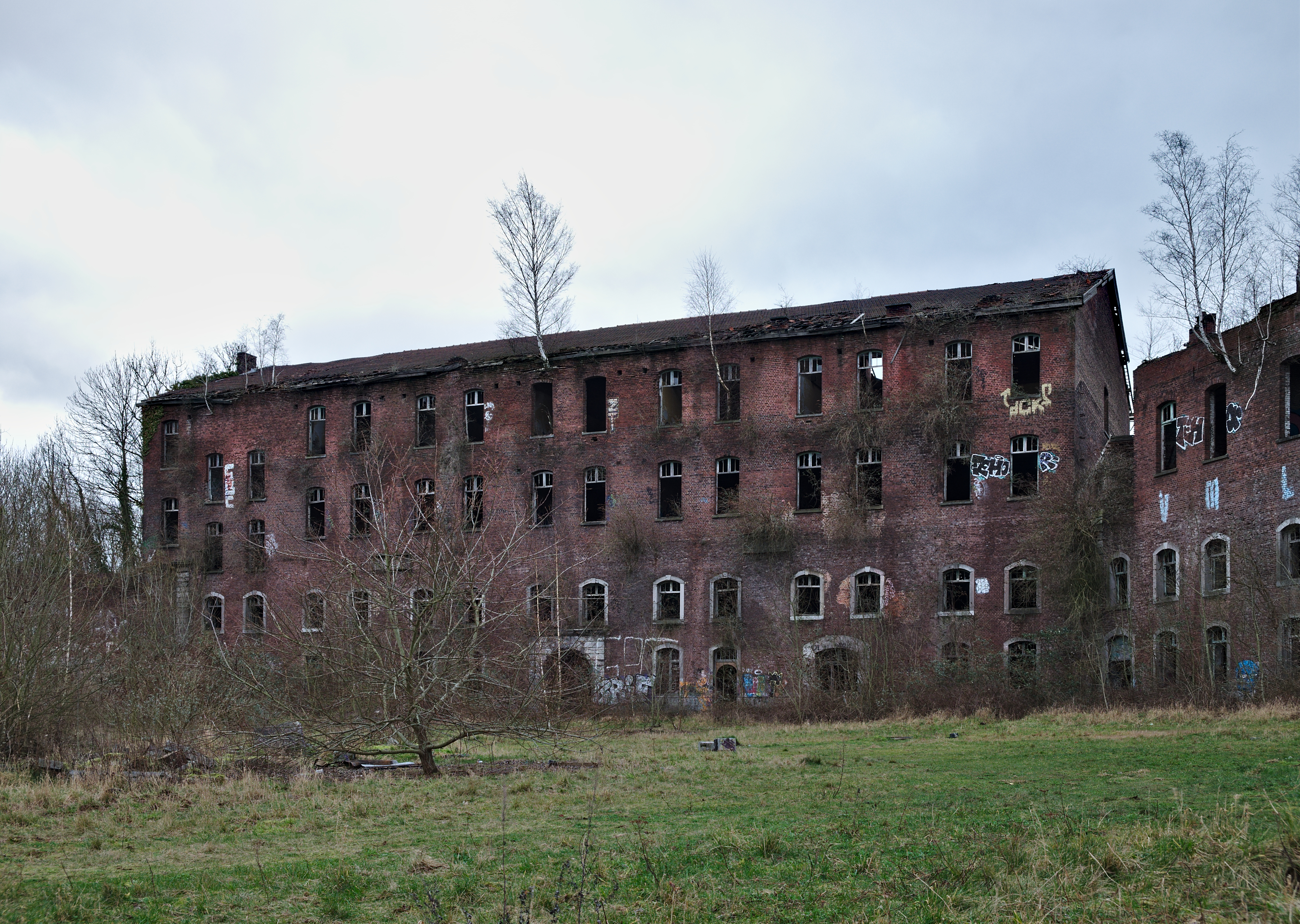
- Abandoned building, Fort de la Chartreuse

Site information
- Type: Fort
- Owner: State of Belgium
- Controlled by: Belgium
- Open to the public: Yes
- Condition: Abandoned, parkland

Location
- Coordinates: 50.631688°N 5.596161°E

Site history
- Built: 1817
- Materials: Masonry
- Battles/wars: Battle of Liège

The Fort de la Chartreuse, which dominates the Amercœur neighborhood of Liège in Belgium, was built between 1817 and 1823 to defend the city.

== History ==
The fort is built on a strategic height that dominates the valley of the Meuse, which had been occupied by a Carthusian (Ordre des Chartreux) monastery until the French Revolution. The fort was built by the Dutch, who at the time administered southern Belgium. After the Belgian Revolution, the Kingdom of Belgium used Fort de la Chartreuse as a barracks for the Fortified Position of Liège, having built twelve new forts around the city in the late 19th century as part of the country's overall National Redoubt.

In 1891 a royal decree downgraded the fort and the nearby Citadel of Liège, following the construction of twelve modern forts surrounding Liége. The fort was thereafter used as a barracks. From 1914 to 1918 the Germans used it as a prison, and again from 1940 to 1944. In 1944-1945 it was used by the Americans as a military hospital. The Belgian army left the site in 1988.

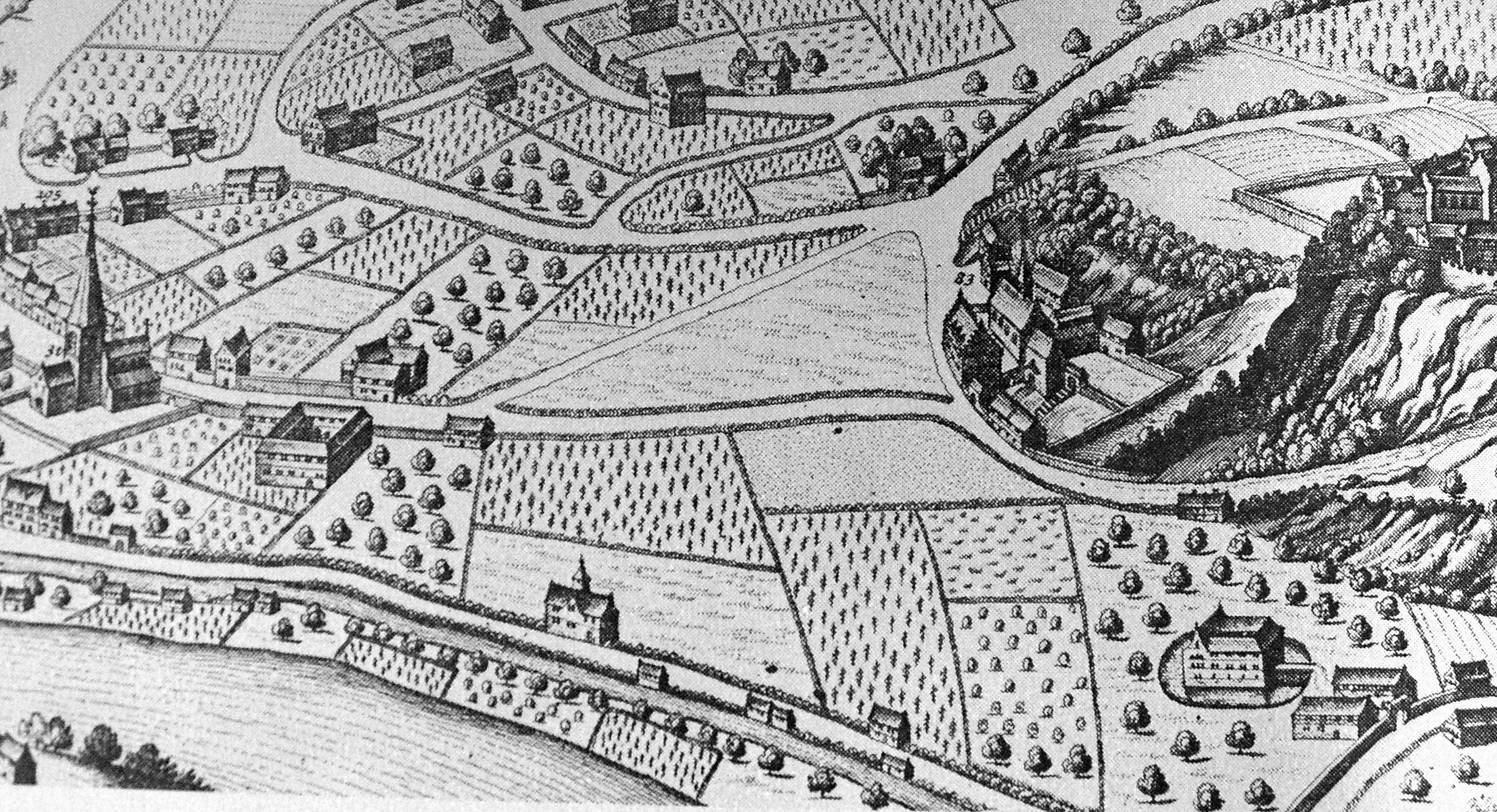
Fort de la Chartreuse on Mont Cornillon (right)

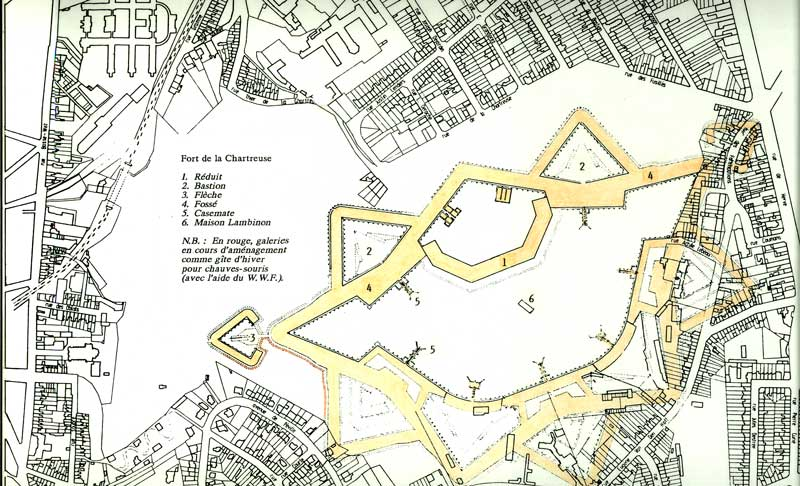
Plan of Fort de la Chartreuse

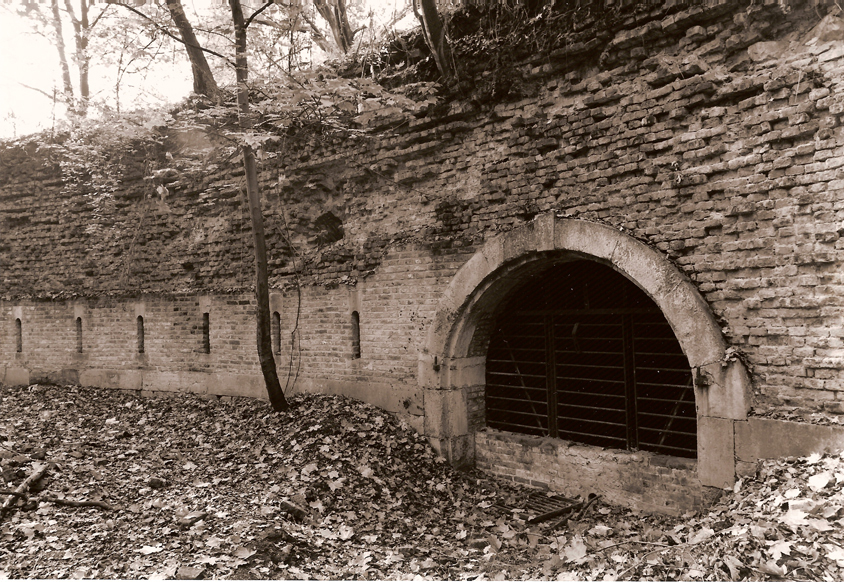
Entry in a redan of Fort de la Chartreuse

== Environment ==
The greater part of the fort occupies a green space that is being reforested. The ramparts and glacis are covered with vegetation.

== Bibliography ==
- Brasseur, Th. (1993). La Chartreuse : forteresse hollandaise en sursis. Centre Nature & Patrimoine, Flémalle.
- Brasseur, Th. (1994). La Chartreuse de Liège. Centre Nature & Patrimoine, Flémalle.
- Liénard, J.(2000). Le fort de la Chartreuse, création hollandaise (1818-1823) à Liège. Bulletin d'information du C.L.H.A.M., 9 : 5-28.
- Loxhay, J. (1995). Le fort de la Chartreuse. Historique de la genèse à nos jours. PIMM'S Edition, Liège.
- Metzmacher, M. (1990). Les milieux semi-naturels: des outils pour concilier loisirs et éducation à la nature. Le cas des milieux semi-naturels urbains et péri-urbains. In : Actes du colloque "Gérer la nature?", Travaux Conservation de la nature, 15/2 :593-606.
