= Montagne de Bueren =

374-step staircase in Liège, Belgium

- Stairway
- {{{other_names}}}
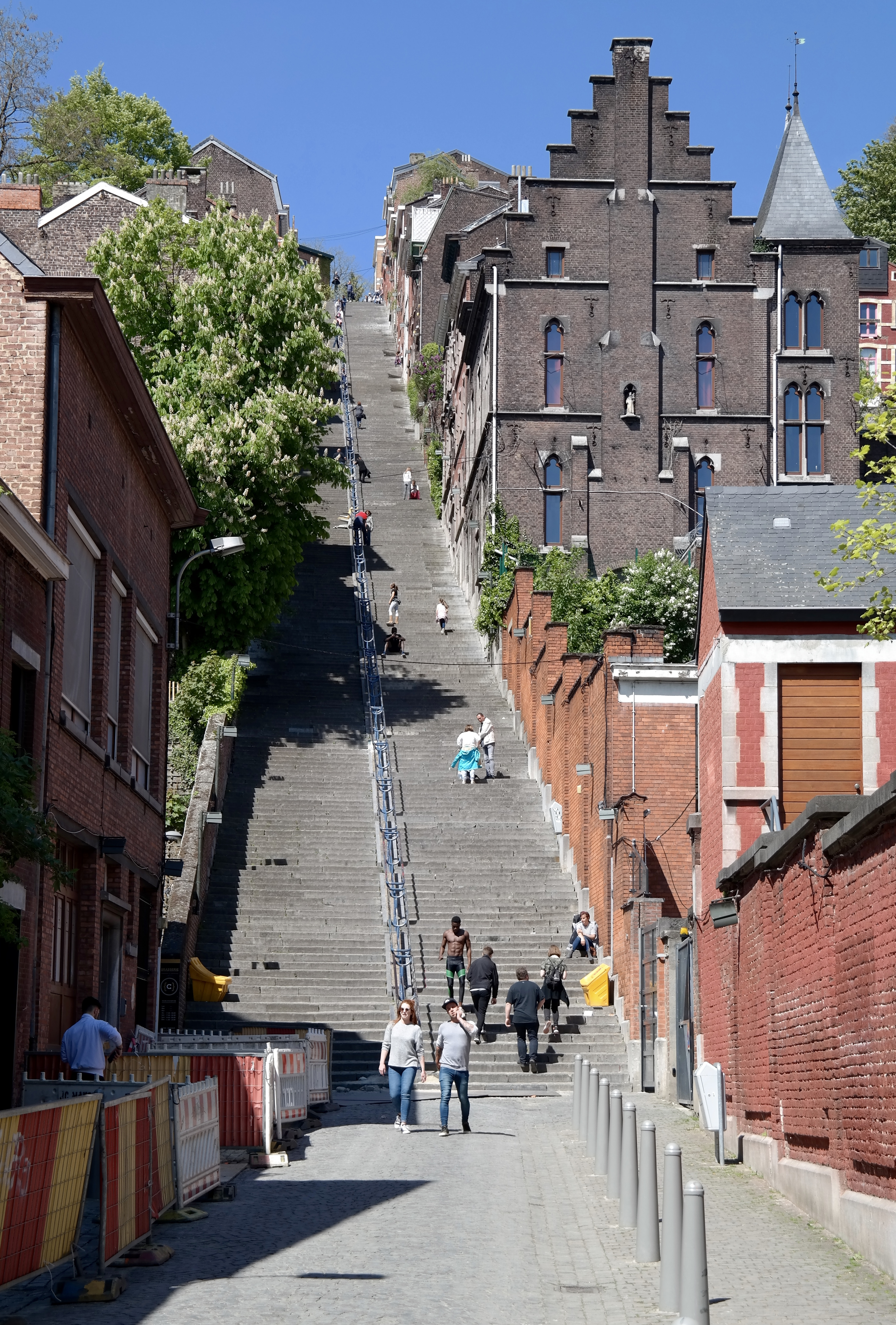
- Montagne de Bueren
- Constructed: 1881
- Steps: 374
- Surface: bricks, sandstone blocks
- Dedicated to: Vincent de Bueren
- Location: Liège, Belgium
- Interactive map of Montagne de Bueren
- Coordinates: 50°38′54″N 5°34′38″E

Montagne de Bueren (French pronunciation: [mɔ̃taɲ də byʁɛn, -ʁən]) is a 374-step staircase in Liège, Belgium. The staircase is named after Vincent de Bueren, who defended Liège against an attack by the Duke of Burgundy, Charles the Bold in the 15th century. It was built in 1881 to honour the 600 soldiers who died in the battle.

In 2013, Montagne de Bueren was ranked as no. 1 on The Huffington Post's list of Most Extreme Staircases.

In July 2020, in response to the impact of the COVID-19 pandemic in Belgium, Belgian explorer and adventurer Louis-Philippe Loncke ascended and descended the staircase 135 times carrying a 15 kg (33 lb) backpack, simulating an ascent of Mount Everest. The 9,000 m (30,000 ft) climb, which took 65 hours 30 minutes, was meant to show that one could still "find physical challenges close to home".

On the night of 17 March 2024, it was repainted by Pro-Palestinian activists with the Palestinian flag. The fresco was removed the next day by the city's authorities.
