= Interallied Memorial of Cointe =

Coordinates: 50.6198°N 5.5694°E

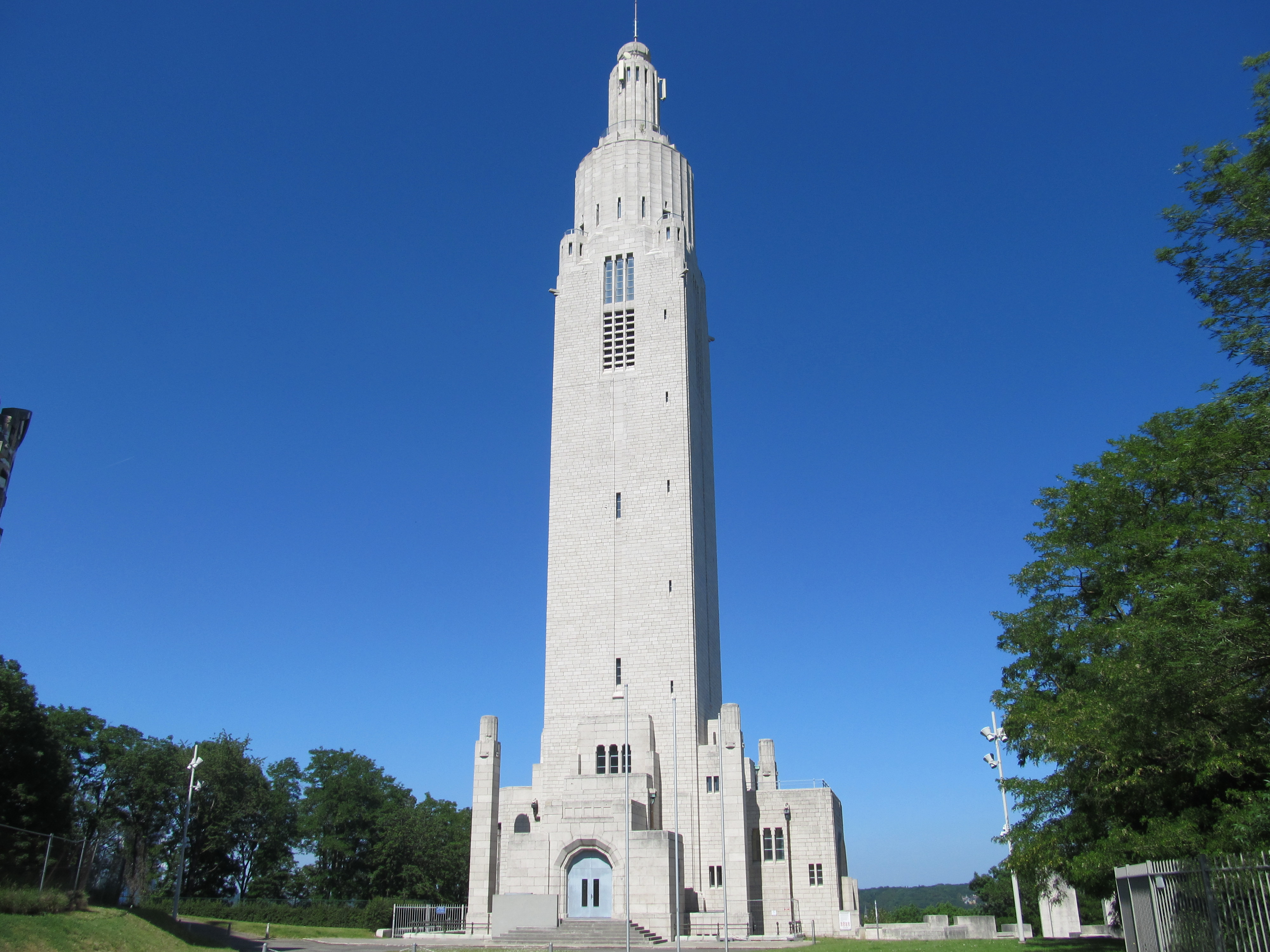
- The Interallied Memorial Tower
- Interactive map of Interallied Memorial of Cointe
- Location: Liège, Belgium
- Designer: Joseph Smolderen
- Beginning date: September 1928
- Completion date: July 1937
- Opening date: 20 July 1937
- Dedicated to: Allies of World War I
- style: Neo-Byzantine, Art Deco

The Interallied Memorial at Cointe (in French: Mémorial Interallié) is a war memorial built after World War I in Liège, Belgium. The memorial is a complex consisting of the Sacré-Cœur church as a religious building and a cenotaph with a tower as a secular monument.

== History ==
On 3 August 1914, Germany declared war on France and Belgium, and the following day German troops invaded Belgium to advance towards Paris, triggering the military campaign on the Western Front in World War I. The city of Liège, an important railway junction between Germany and France via Brussels, was the first in which the Belgian army resisted, aided by the city's belt of 12 forts. German troops attacked the city on 5 August, believing they would achieve an easy victory, but the Belgian defenders, though greatly outnumbered, held out heroically for 11 days, inflicting heavy losses on the invading forces.

In 1925, after the war, FIDAC (Inter-Allied Federation of Ex-Combatants) decided to build a monument dedicated to the memory of all those who lost their lives fighting on the side of the Allied forces. The monument was supposed to be financed by public and private subscriptions in the Allied countries.

Initially it was intended that the monument would be erected in Sarajevo, where the Assassination of Archduke Franz Ferdinand triggered World War I, but the Italian members of the FIDAC used their veto, as the Kingdom of Italy was at that time in conflict with the Kingdom of Yugoslavia over control of the Adriatic Sea. Consequently, the FIDAC members agreed on Liège, as it had been the first city after the outbreak of war to be attacked and resist the enemy.

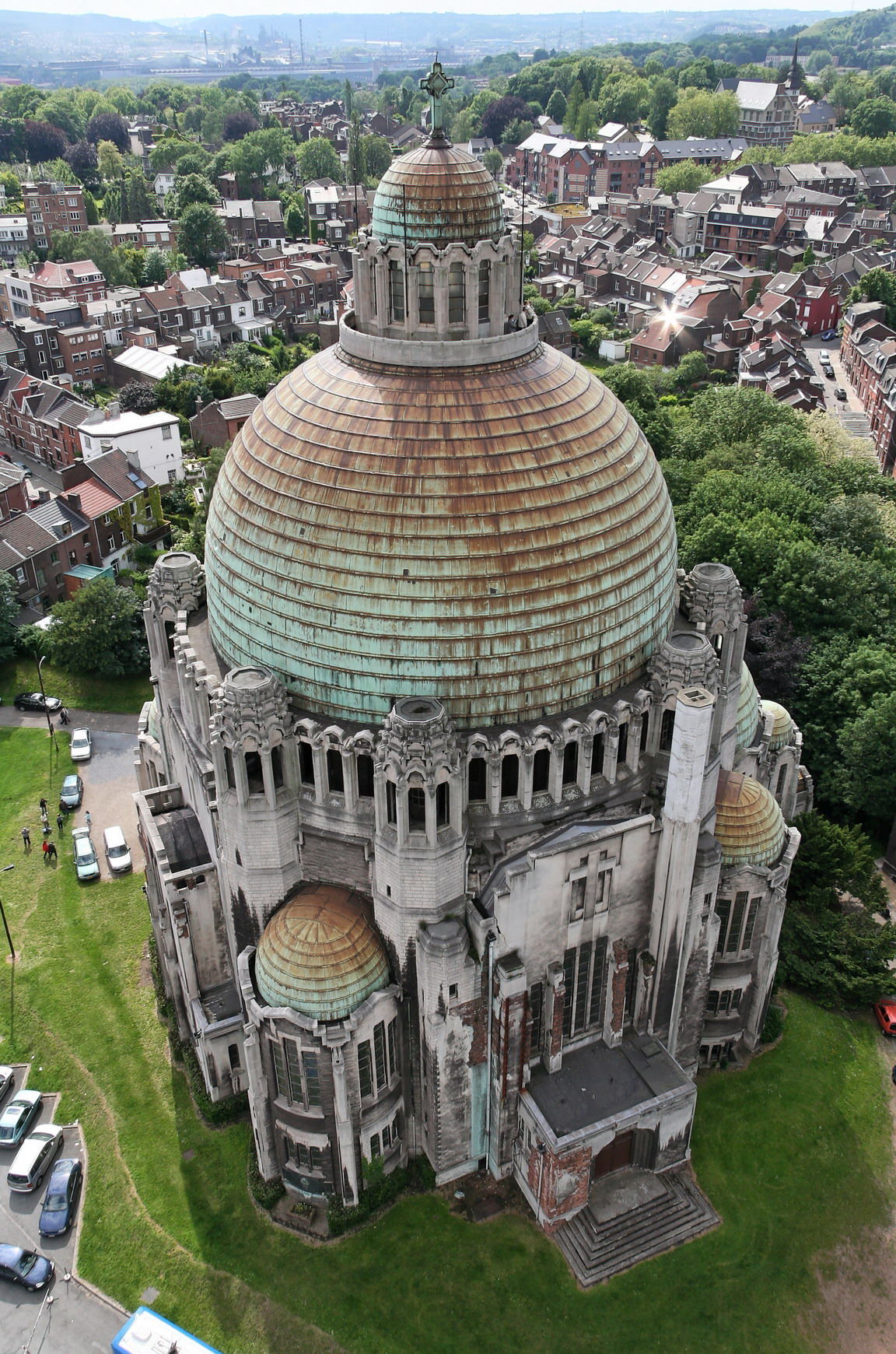
The Sacré-Cœur Church, photographed from the top of the Interallied Memorial Tower

A Belgian committee chaired by Princess Jeanne de Merode (1874–1955), a person well known for her charitable works, was chosen to erect the monument. The committee searched for a suitable site for the monument and finally combined the project with that of a local association that wanted to build a church to commemorate the victims of the war. The association already had a plot of land on Cointe Hill for this purpose, but not the funds to build it.

The design of the monument was entrusted to the Antwerp architect Joseph Smolderen, and work began in September 1928. The religious edifice, completed first, was consecrated and dedicated to the Most Sacred Heart of Jesus (in French Sacré-Cœur) in 1936. Its dome was made of 13 tons of copper sheet from Katanga, at that time a province of the Belgian Congo colony, then rolled in the "Cuivre et Zinc" factories in Chênée. The secular monument was inaugurated on 20 July 1937, in the presence of King Leopold III.

The Belgian State, which became the owner of the tower in 1949, carried out restoration work from 1962 onwards, especially as the whole memorial had been damaged by aerial bombardment during World War II. The work was completed in 1968, and on 20 November King Baudouin I proceeded to a second inauguration.

Since 1985, the tower and the church have been open to the public, but visits are only allowed three times a year: on Whit Sunday, on Walloon Heritage Days (in September) and on Belgian National Day.

In the spring of 2007, the Belgian federal authority for buildings began renovation work on the interior and exterior of the site, planned over several years.

The church was desecrated in 2010, and its owner, the parish association "Monument régional du Sacré Cœur", which no longer has the funds to maintain and rehabilitate it, has announced that it is looking for a buyer. The building is in a visible state of disrepair. In 2014, to mask the state of the building during the ceremonies commemorating the 100th anniversary of the outbreak of World War I, the Prime Minister's Chancellery commissioned a work by French graffiti artist Bonom (Vincent Glowinski), who painted a mural on the walls of the church depicting 100 doves of peace.

On 24 January 2011, the Sacré-Cœur church was listed under code 62063-CLT-0430-01 and included in the list of the Walloon Region's immovable heritage.

Since 2000, the Cointe tunnel, an infrastructure work on the A602 motorway, has been crossing under the site.

== Description ==
The church houses various heritage items such as the statues of two saints, Saint Maurus and Saint Mortus, who is the patron saint of the Cointe district. The secular memorial houses several monuments and works donated by the Allied nations. A total of seven countries are represented, France, Greece, Italy, Poland, United Kingdom, Romania, Russia and Spain. Some of the monuments are located on the esplanade outside and others in the mausoleum at the base of the votive tower, in the crypt and its halls. The tower, built in Art Deco style is 75 metres high and ends at the top with a cylindrical canopy in successive recesses.

The Cointe site is unique in Belgium, both in that it associates the secular and the religious within the same memorial, and in that it is a symbol of the collective homage paid to the country by the Allies in the First World War.

== Monuments ==
Numerous monuments and memorials donated by Allied nations are displayed in the tower mausoleum and on the adjoining esplanade. In 1937, when the memorial was inaugurated, there were only the French, Romanian, Spanish and Italian memorials.

=== On the esplanade ===
- Italy: "Statue of the Italian fantassin", dedicated to Italian infantrymen.
- United Kingdom: "The Wall", erected "in memory of the brave British Armed Forces".
- Poland: "The Washed Stones", "in memory of Polish soldiers who fought for our freedom and yours".
- Russia: Tragic composition "To the Russian and Soviet soldiers who fell during the First and Second World Wars".
- Greece: Monument composed of a pyramid made of 114 helmets inspired by Spartan soldiers. The monument was made on the initiative of Dimitris Avramopoulos, then Greek consul in Liège, and was officially inaugurated on 11 November 1988. Three of the helmets were stolen a few months after its inauguration, and another 12 in spring 2020. On the weekend of 16–17 January 2021, all the other helmets were stolen by unknown perpetrators, with police suspecting metal thieves. A metal panel of similar size to the original monument was placed on the site of the helmet pyramid, with the 114 helmets drawn on it.

One side of the esplanade is enclosed by a stone wall inscribed "Aux défenseurs de Liège, les Nations alliées, 1914–1918" (in Defenders of Liège, the Allied Nations, 1914–1918).

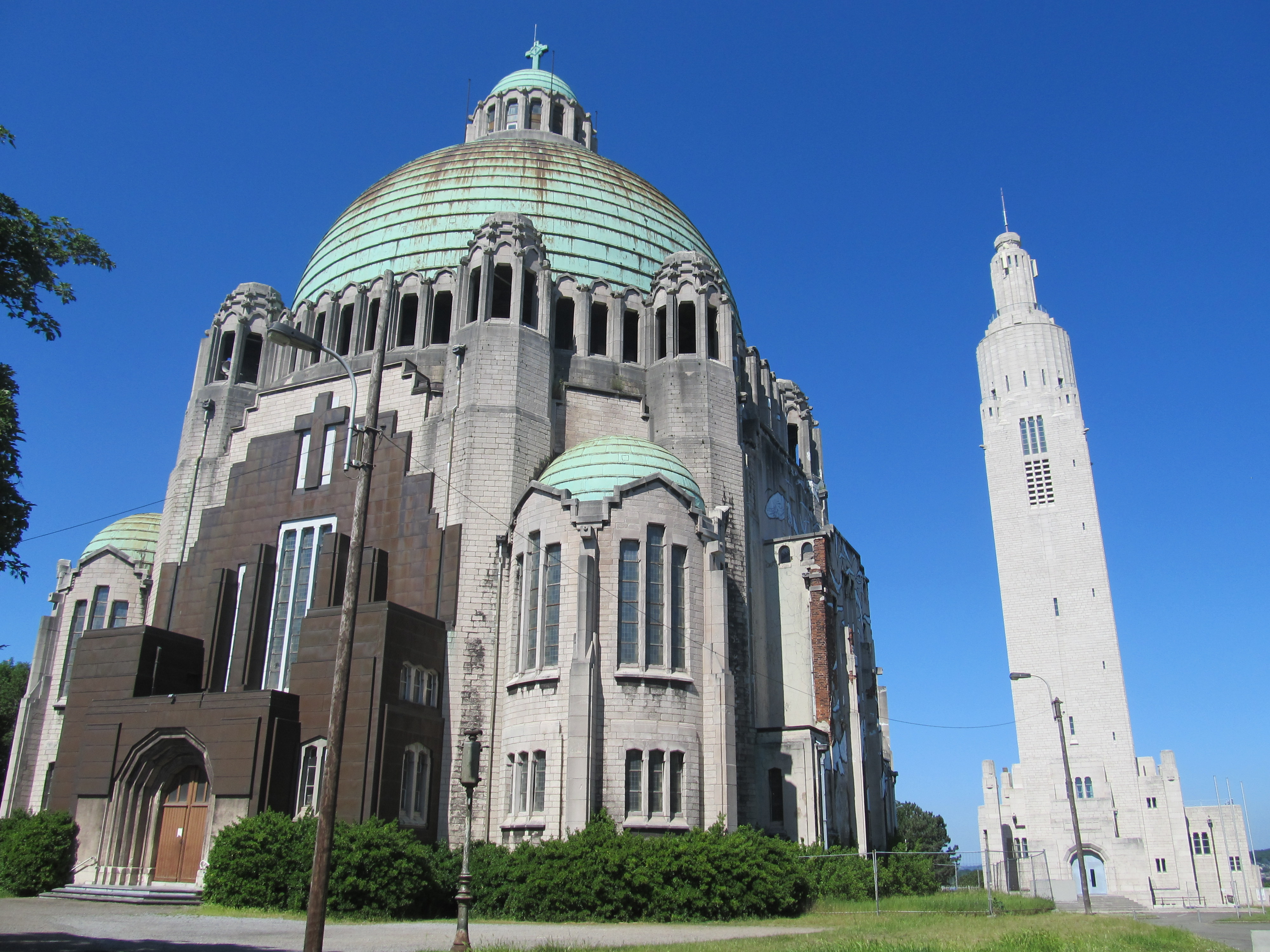
The church and the tower

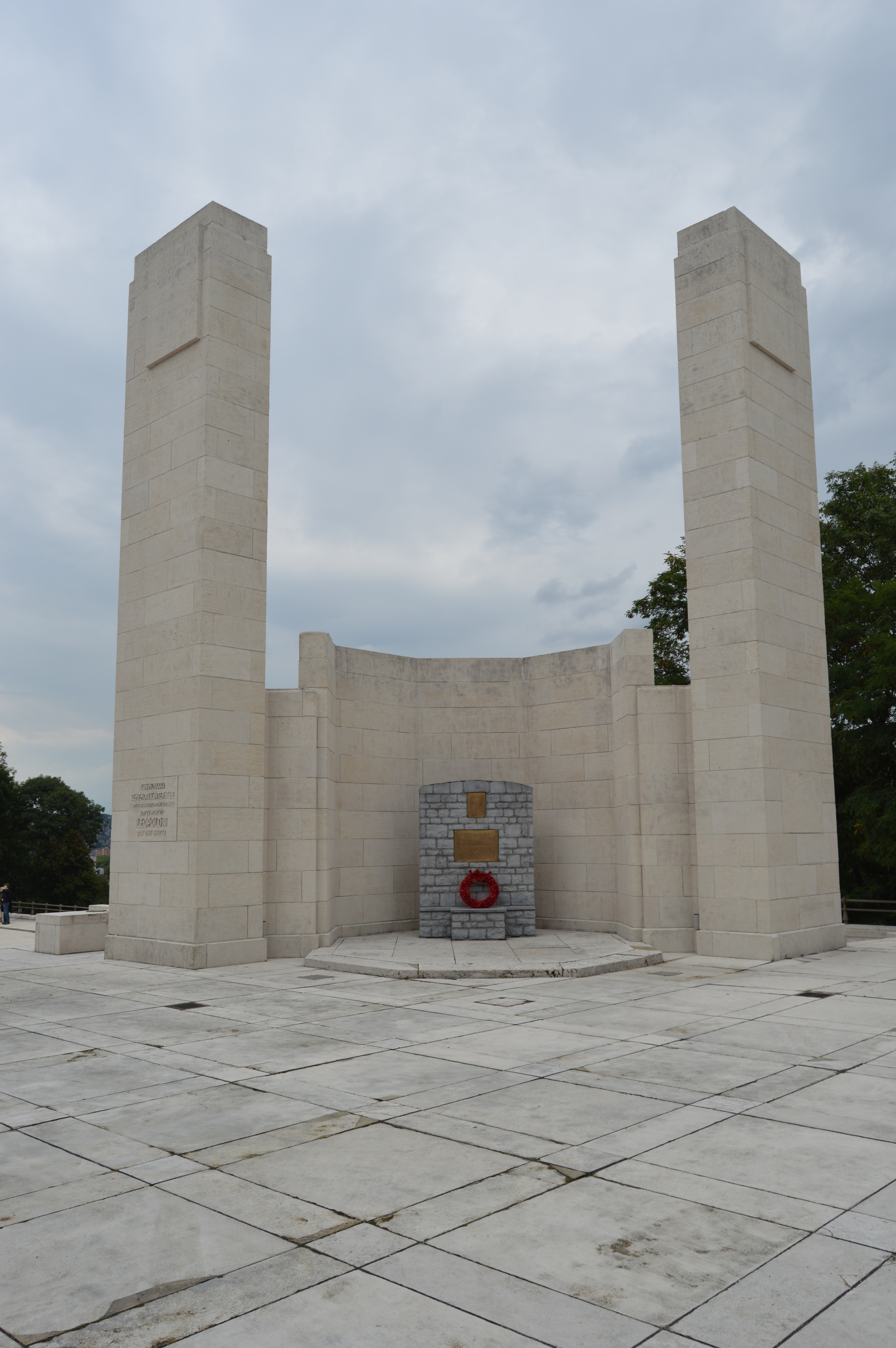
British Monument

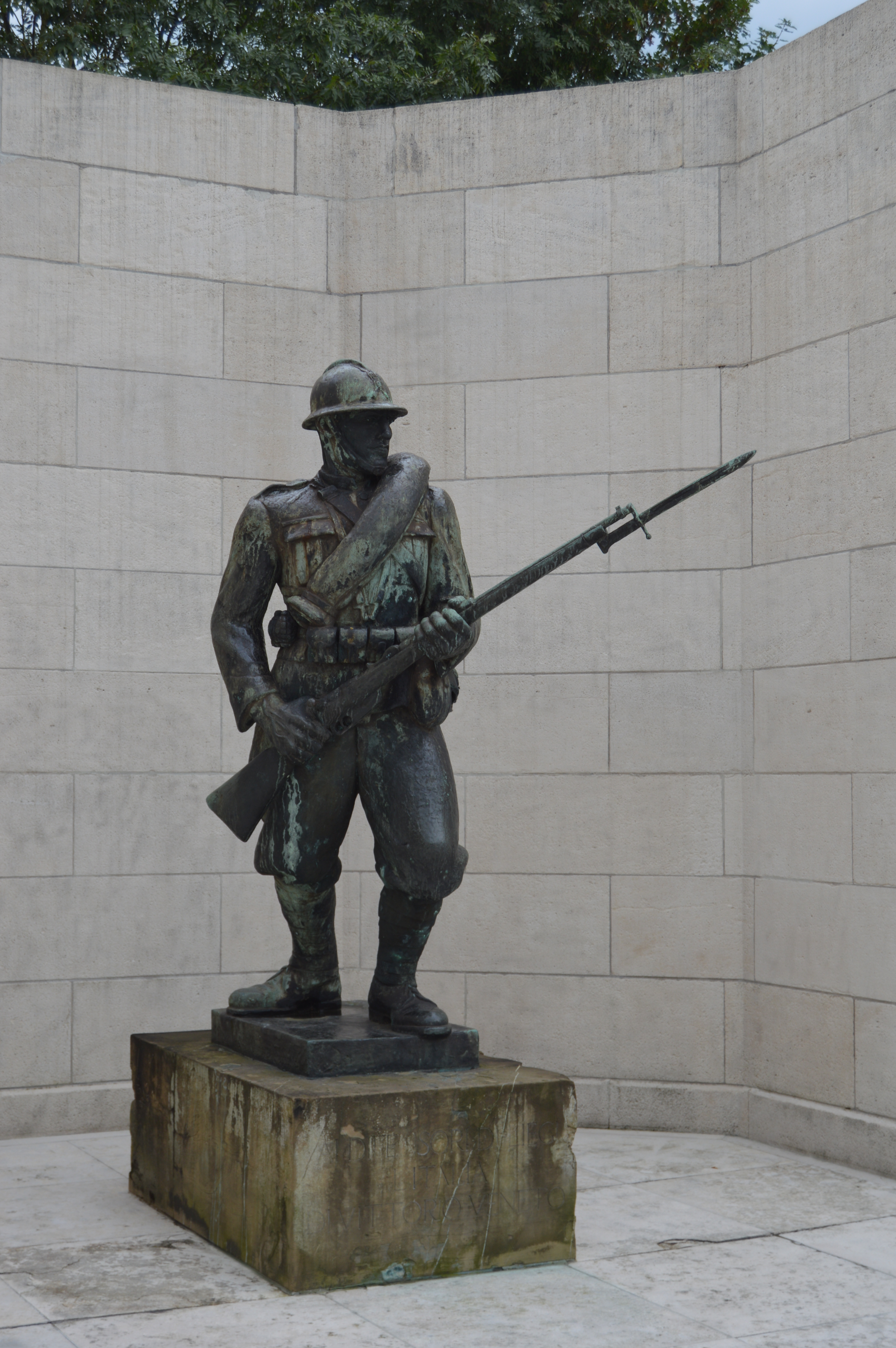
Italian Monument

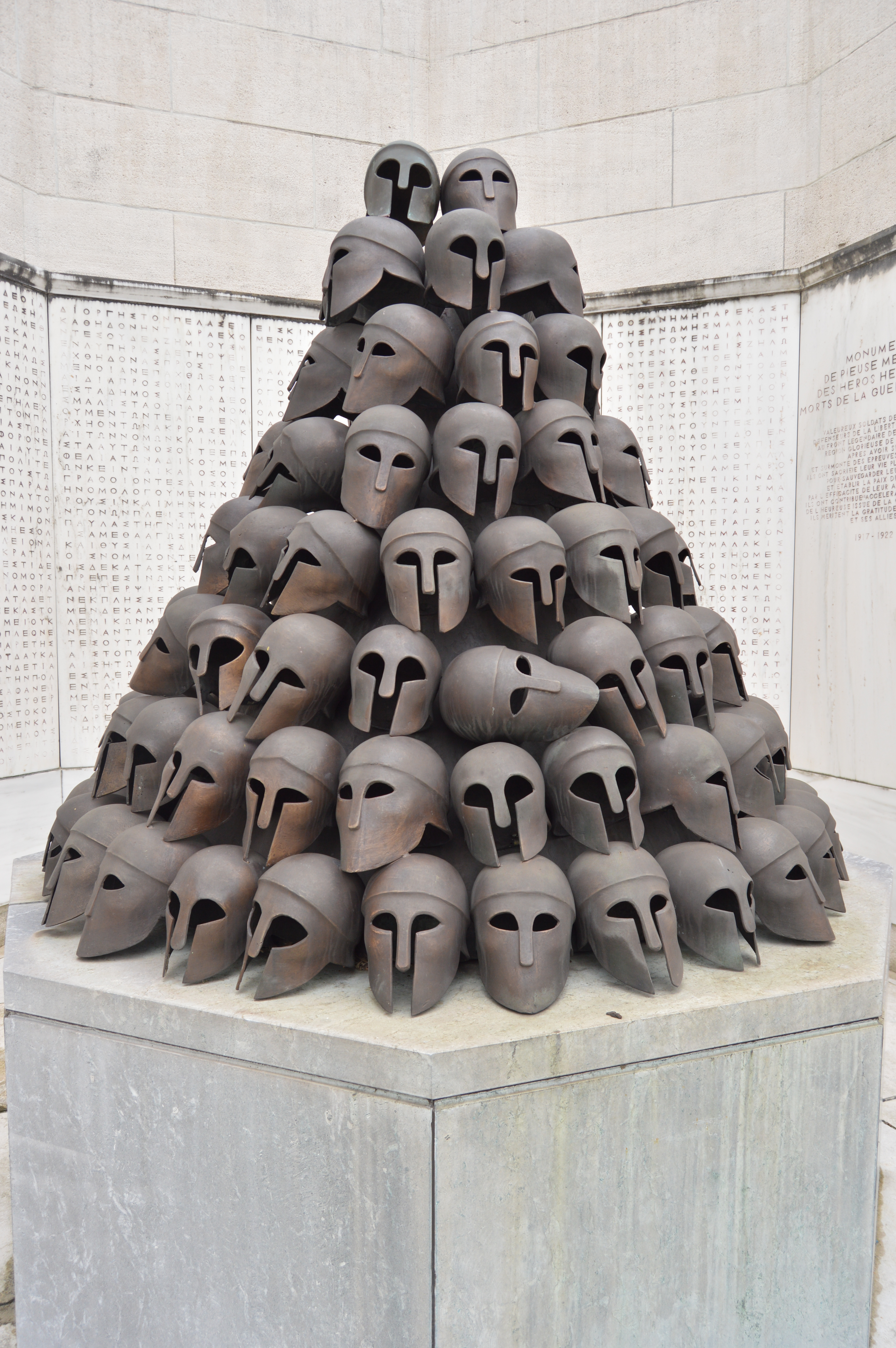
Greek monument, stolen in January 2021

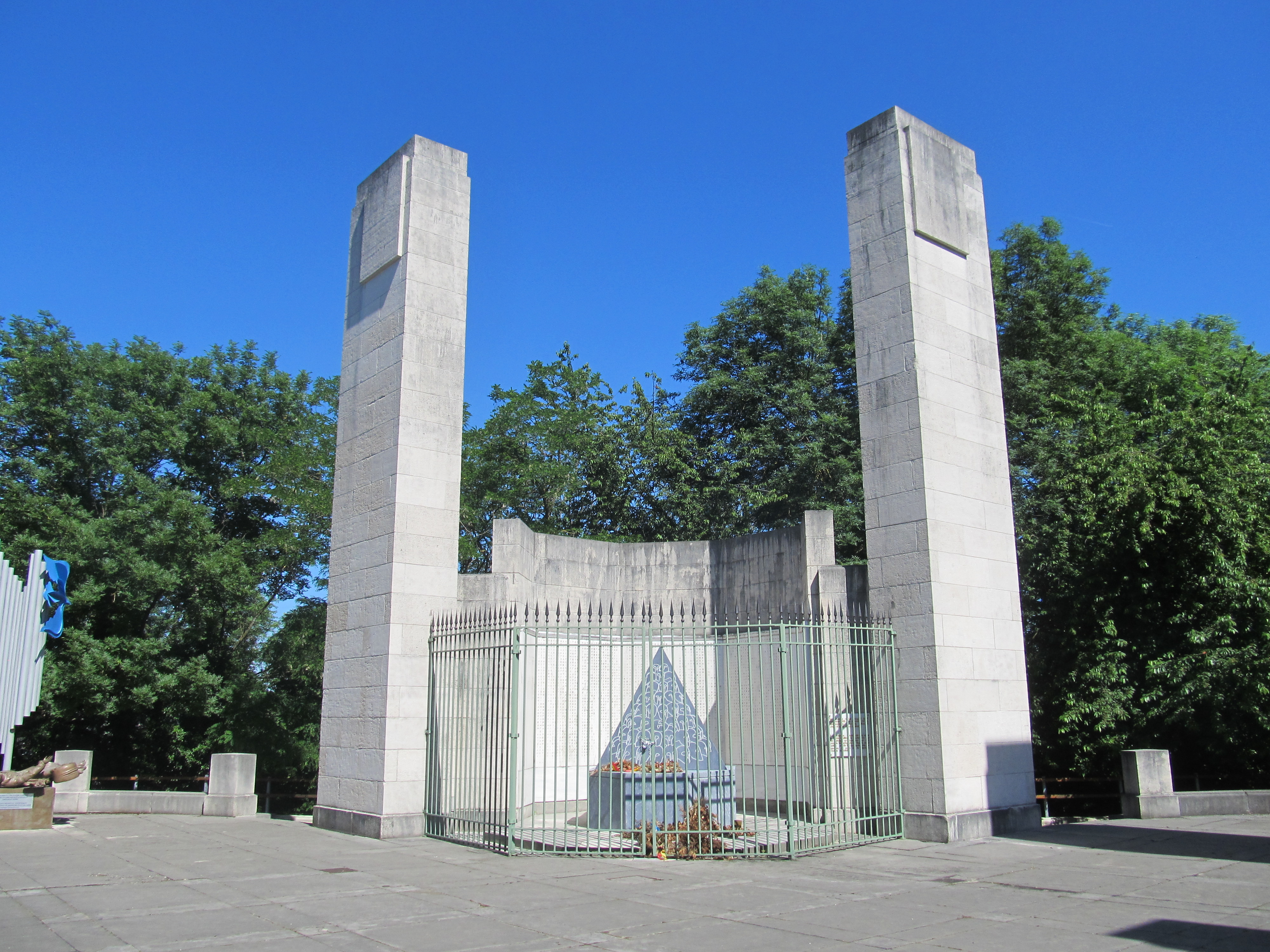
Copy installed after the theft of the original Greek monument

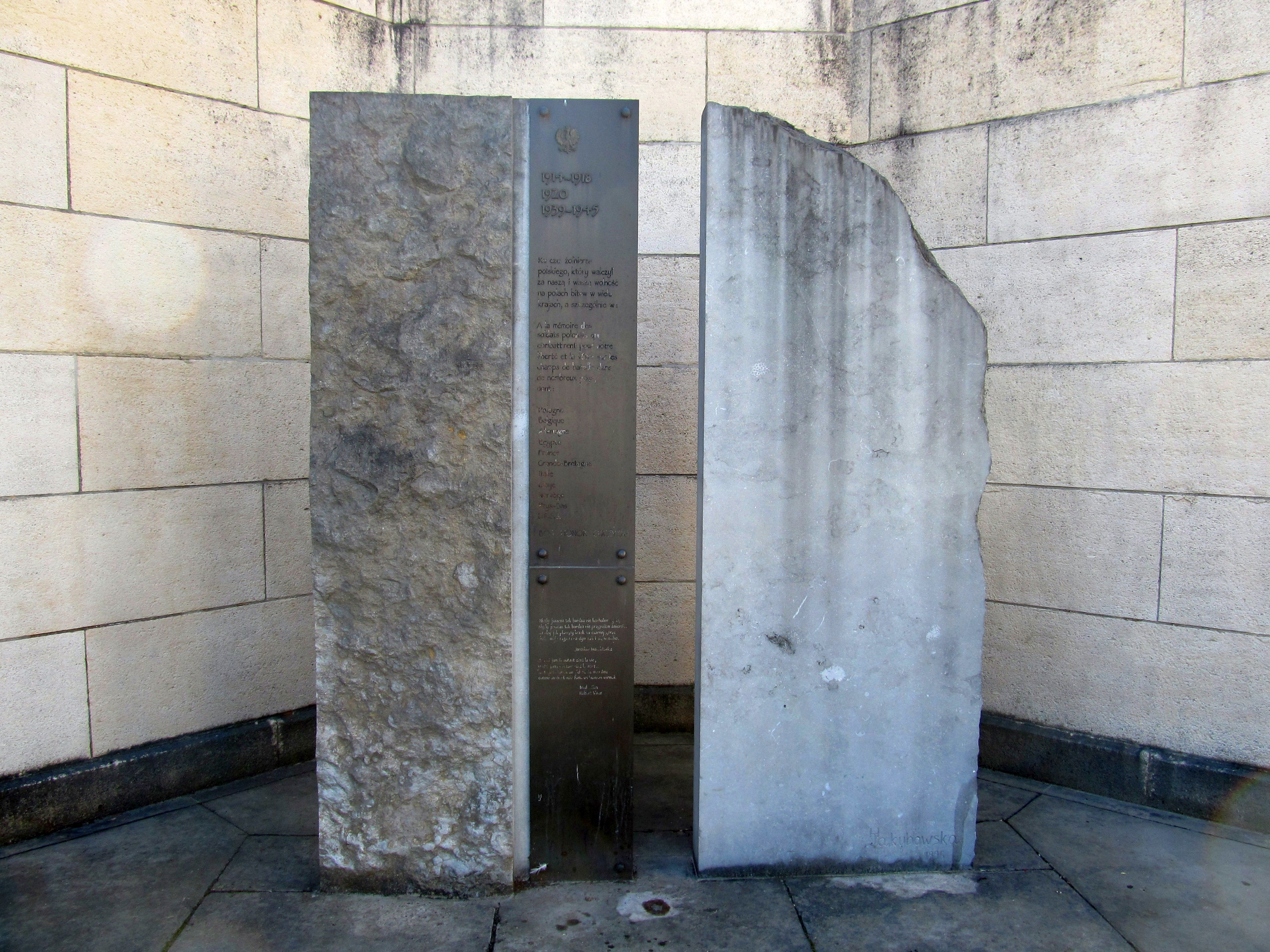
Polish Monument

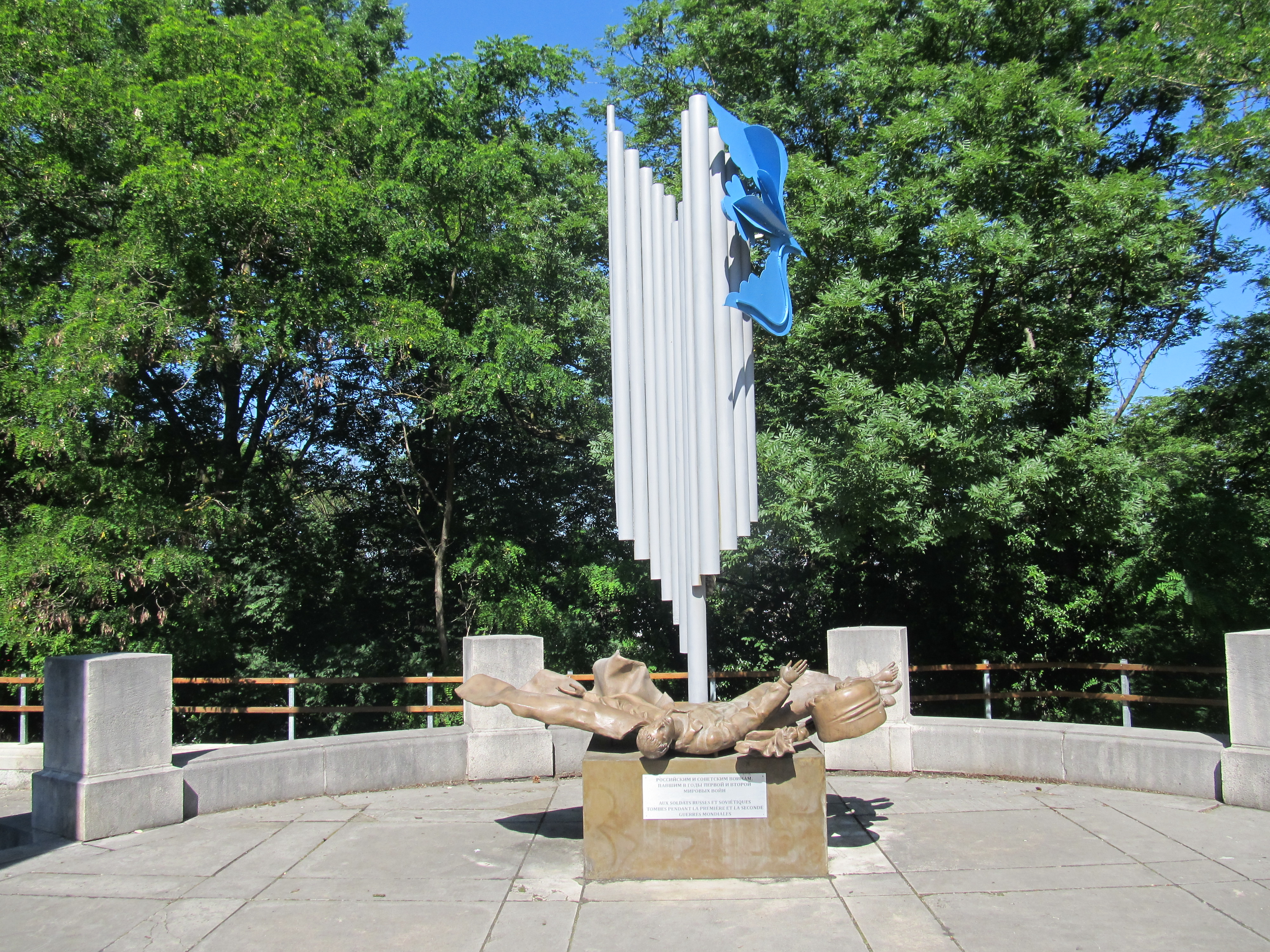
Russian Monument

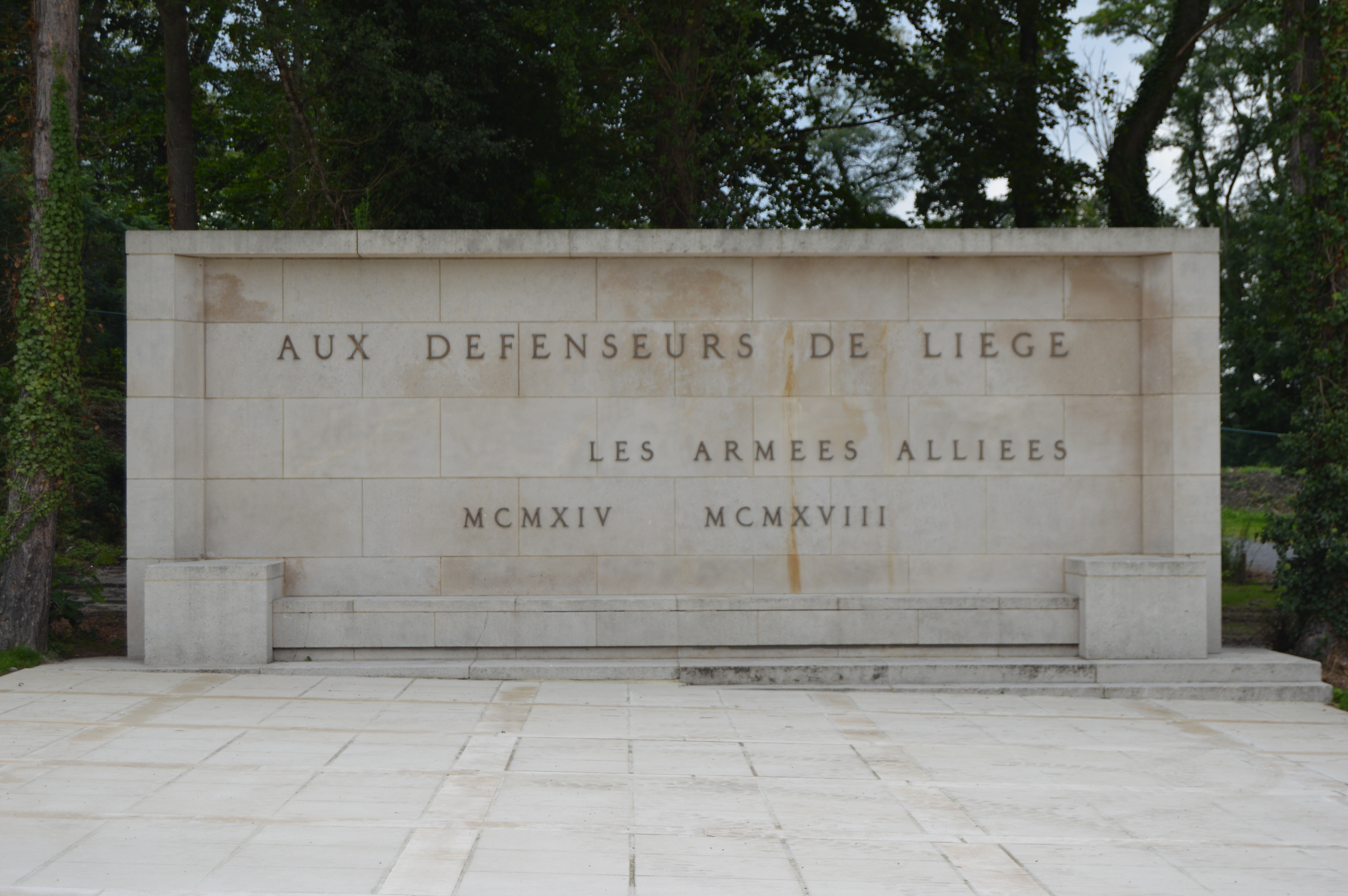
Monument to the defenders of Liège

=== Inside the tower ===
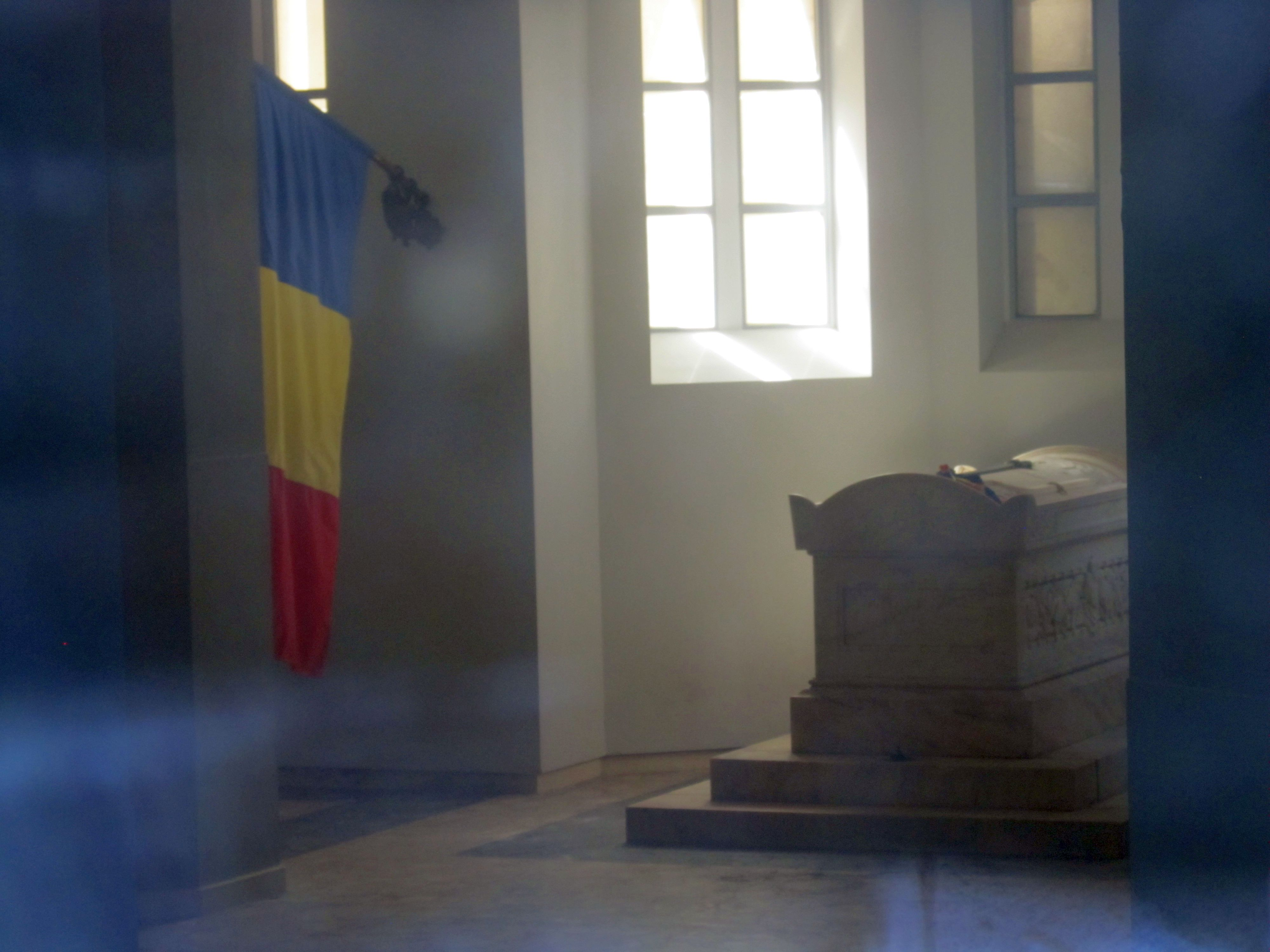
Romanian sarcophagus

- France: Allegory "À la Belgique, la France reconnaissante" (in "To Belgium, grateful France"), including a message from French President Raymond Poincaré and King Albert I of Belgium.
- Romania: Sarcophagus "Aux Héros" (in "To the Heroes"), an ensemble whose main element is a sarcophagus carved from a block of white Transylvanian marble, in the Romano-Byzantine style, and weighing 6 tons.
- Spain: neutral country during the war, but which sent aid, hence the plaque inscribed "La Belgique se souvient de l'aide humanitaire du noble peuple espagnol" (Belgium remembers the humanitarian aid of the noble Spanish people).

== Searchlight ==
Tests were carried out in November 2012 after a searchlight was installed at the top of the tower. The searchlight, similar to the one installed on Eiffel Tower, was inaugurated on 4 August 2014, coinciding with the celebrations commemorating the 100th anniversary of the outbreak of World War I. The lighthouse operates a maximum of four hours a night, never after 01:00, and only on weekends and public holidays or during commemorative events.

The searchlight was made by the Sky Light company, which developed a type of searchlight that operates with low energy consumption, based on the rotation of an optical block placed at the output of a xenon projector with a power of 2000 W, installed vertically, and which will only require an annual change of the lamp.

== Commemorating the First World War ==
On 4 August 2014, a major commemoration was held at the Interallied Memorial on the occasion of the centenary of the outbreak of the First World War. The official festivities were attended by numerous heads of state, as well as representatives of former combatants.

== Panorama ==
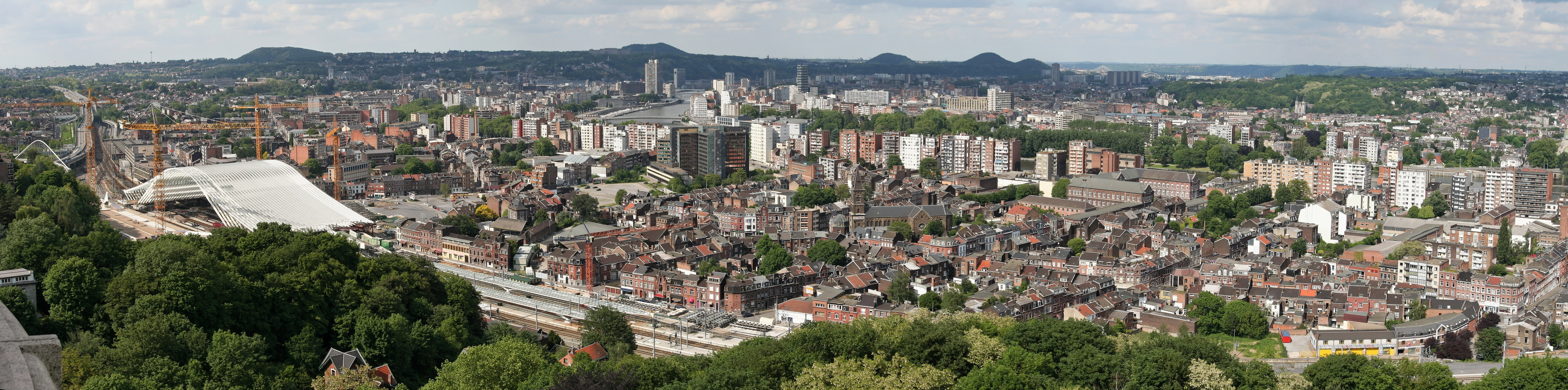
The city of Liège seen from the top of the Interallied Memorial tower in June 2006. On the left, Liège-Guillemins railway station, under construction at the time. At the top of the photo the Meuse river can be seen flowing through the central area, and on the horizon the tailings deposits of the former coal mines Sainte-Barbe, Batterie nouveau, Petite Bacnure, Bernalmont and Belle-Vue.

== Bibliography ==
- Barlet, Jacques; Hamal, Olivier; Mainil, Sébastien (2014). "Le mémorial interallié de Cointe à Liège" [The interallied memorial at Cointe in Liège]. Carnets du patrimoine (in French). 122. Institut du Patrimoine wallon: 52. ISBN 978-2-87522-132-2.
