= Men of Understanding =

The Men of Understanding (Homines Intelligentiae) were a Christian sect in the Low Countries of Europe in the late 14th and early 15th century until their suppression by the Inquisition.

The sect was founded by Ægidius Cantor, a layman, and was led by Cantor and a Dutch Carmelite named William of Hildernissen.

The sect was doctrinally related to the earlier Brethren of the Free Spirit; they subscribed to a form of universal reconciliation which included demons, the idea that bodily sin could not defile the soul, and a mystical state of perfect illumination and union with God which exempted from all laws and guaranteed salvation. They believed that prayer had no benefits and that there was no resurrection. Both men reported visions; Cantor once, in a state of religious exaltation, ran nude through the streets of Brussels, declaring himself the saviour of mankind.

About 1410, Peter d'Ailly, Bishop of Cambrai, initiated the suppression of the Men of Understanding by the Inquisition. William of Hildernissen recanted, both in 1410 and after a second investigation in 1411, after which he was sentenced permanently to a Carmelite monastery in another diocese. The sect was dissolved after this time.
