= Elishout Farm =

Historic farmstead in Anderlecht, Belgium

- Ferme Elishout (French); Elishouthoeve (Dutch)
- The Elishout Farm seen from the Avenue Émile Gryson/Emile Grysonlaan

General information
- Location: Sentier de la Drève / Dreefpad 25, 1070 Anderlecht, Brussels-Capital Region, Belgium
- Coordinates: 50°48′53.4″N 4°17′34.1″E
- Construction started: 12th century
- Renovated: 1974–1978
- Owner: Flemish Community Commission

Design and construction
- Designations: Protected (16/10/1975)

Other information
- Public transit: 5 CERIA/COOVI

The Elishout Farm (French: Ferme Elishout; Dutch: Elishouthoeve) is a historic farmstead in Anderlecht, a municipality of Brussels, Belgium. Originally an alder grove owned by the Lords of Aa, the site was located near Waesbroeck Castle, which is believed to have served as the seat of the lords. A farmstead was established on the site in the 12th century. Around 1173, the farmstead and its surrounding land were donated to Forest Abbey. The historic farmstead is now located on the campus of the Food and Chemical Industries Education and Research Center (CERIA/COOVI).

== History ==
Around 1173, lands in the area were donated to Forest Abbey by several members of the nobility, including Godevaert de Trie, Eggebert van Bijgaarden and Laurette of Flanders, daughter of Thierry, Count of Flanders, and a religious at the abbey. Elishout subsequently became part of the abbey's network of tenant farms in the region.

In 1328, Elishout was recorded as one of the abbey's most important farms. The farm was occupied by a tenant farmer, while the farmstead, its furnishings and agricultural equipment belonged to the abbey. A lease dating from 1433 confirms the abbey's ownership. The tenant was required to surrender one tenth of the harvest as a tithe, which was stored in the Tiendenschuur (lit. 'Tithe Barn'). The abbess also had the right to stay at the farm for several days each year, sometimes accompanied by members of her household. A hermit also lived at the farmstead during the 14th century. The abbess of Forest, as the farmstead's owner, provided him with two and a half gelte of hop liqueur annually.

The tenancy was traditionally passed from one generation to the next. Until 1799, the farm was occupied by a small number of tenant families, including the Van Bever, Van Cutsem, Verheyleweghe and Crookaert. The farmlands consisted of several dispersed parcels rather than a single area surrounding the buildings. They included areas known as Achter den bos, Lange Haag, Lange Veld, Aaveld, St-Anna-veld, Pedeveld and Leefputten. The development of the farm is documented in the records of Forest Abbey. A land register from 1638 depicts Elishout together with several nearby landmarks, including Waesbroeck Castle, Hof ter Vleest and the Chapel of Aa. Major works were carried out at the farm in 1682. Further reconstruction began in 1702 and resulted in most of the buildings that survive today.

In the 18th century, the estate became known as the Pachthof van Depie, after the family of tenant farmers. Jean Josse de Trieu and Marie-Madeleine De Fraye were among its later owners. On 16 October 1789, they sold the estate to Charles Swerts, a fishmonger from Brussels. During the French Revolution, the farm was sold again and subsequently passed through several owners.

In the 1950s, the Province of Brabant established the bilingual Food and Chemical Industries Education and Research Center (CERIA/COOVI) educational and research campus and the farmstead was incorporated into the campus. In the 1970s, the farmstead was considered for demolition after it fell into disrepair and stood vacant for several years. The complex was designated a protected monument on 16 October 1975. Between 1974 and 1978, the province carried out a major restoration.

Following the division of the Province of Brabant in 1995, the Dutch-speaking section of the school, COOVI, was transferred to the Flemish Community Commission. In 1996, COOVI was renamed Elishout. In 2013, it became COOVI-Elishout, after which the name Elishout gradually became less prominent in favour of the umbrella name COOVI.

== Architecture ==
The original farmstead stood closer to the present-day Rue des Grives/Lijstersstraat and consisted of a dwelling, stables, and two barns, protected by a pond and hedge. One of the barns, the Tiendenschuur (lit. 'Tithe Barn'), stored grain collected for Forest Abbey.

The farmstead was gradually rebuilt and its previously dispersed buildings were regrouped around a square courtyard. The 1638 land register of Forest Abbey depicts a dwelling with an upper storey, cattle and horse stables, two barns, sheep shelters, a dovecote, and a carriage house. Most of the present buildings date from the 18th century, with the date 1754 indicated by numbered anchors on the main building's façade. The current complex was built partly on a different site from the original farmstead.

The buildings are raised above the courtyard, probably to protect them from periodic flooding of the nearby Senne. The larger, elevated main building reflects the status of the tenant farmer, who held the title of Master of Hillenshout. The farm is considered a surviving example of the large abbey farms that once characterised the rural landscape around Brussels.

== See also ==
- History of Brussels
