= Timeline of Bruges =

The following is a timeline of the history of the municipality of Bruges, Belgium.

== Prior to 18th century ==
- 865 – Fort built by Margrave Baldwin I of Flanders.
- 1000 – Regional Brugse Vrije established (approximate date).
- 1127 – Count Charles I of Flanders assassinated.
- 1134 – Storm creates Zwin inlet, connecting Bruges to the North Sea.
- 1146 – Eekhout Abbey active (approximate date).
- 1150 – St. John's Hospital founded (approximate date).
- 1157 – Chapel of the Holy Blood built (approximate date).
- 1180 – Damme harbour built near Bruges.
- 1223 – St. Salvator's Church rebuilt.
- 1240 – Belfry of Bruges built in the Markt (approximate date).
- 1244 – Ten Wijngaerde Béguinage founded (approximate date).
- 1294 – Waterhalle built on the Grote Markt.
- 1297
  - Area of Bruges expanded.
  - Church of Our Lady tower built.
- 1302
  - 18 May: Bruges Matins (massacre) occurs.
  - French-Flemish Battle of the Golden Spurs fought in Kortrijk; Flemish win.
- 1303 – Procession of the Holy Blood instituted.
- 1323–1328 – The Flemish revolt spread to Bruges.
- 1364 – Les Halles built on the Grote Markt.
- 1368 – Smedenpoort (city gate) rebuilt.
- 1369 – Ezelpoort (city gate) rebuilt.
- 1390 – Public clock installed (approximate date).
- 1398 – Tower built on the Minnewater.
- 1399 – Saaihalle built on the Old Beursplein.
- 1417 – Poortersloge built (approximate date).
- 1421 – Bruges City Hall built.
- 1425 – Artist Jan van Eyck active in Bruges.
- 1430 – Order of the Golden Fleece founded in Bruges.
- 1434 – Grafenburg (castle) dismantled.
- 1465 – Artist Hans Memling active in Bruges (approximate date).
- 1468 – July: Wedding of Burgundian duke Charles and Margaret of York.
- 1475 – Printing press in operation.
- 1488 – Political unrest.
- 1489 – Memling paints the St. Ursula Shrine in St. John's Hospital.
- 1505 – Fuggers move from Bruges to Antwerp.
- 1545 – Hanseatic enterprise moves from Bruges to Antwerp.
- 1559 – Roman Catholic Diocese of Bruges established.
- 1623 – Ghent-Bruges Canal dug.

== 18th–19th centuries ==
- 1719 – Academy of Art established.
- 1743 – Lawyer's guild established.
- 1786 – St. Christopher's Church, Bruges demolished.
- 1787
  - Bruge Central Cemetery established.
  - Cloth Hall demolished.
- 1794 – French in power.
- 1798 – Openbare Bibliotheek Brugge (library) opens.
- 1799 – St. Donatian's Cathedral demolished.
- 1815 – Bruges becomes part of the Netherlands.
- 1821 – Fish Market, Bruges built on the Steenhouwersdijk.
- 1830 – Bruges becomes part of Belgium.
- 1837 – Journal de Bruges French-language newspaper begins publication.
- 1838 – Brugge railway station opens.
- 1839 – Société d'émulation de Bruges founded.
- 1846 – Statue of Stevin erected on Simon Stevinplein (Brugge).
- 1855 – Ringvaart, Bruges canal commissioned.
- 1863 – Population: 50,986.
- 1887 – Monument to Breydel/de Coninck erected in the Grote Markt.
- 1891
  - Club Brugge KV football club formed.
  - Post and Telegraph office built on the Grote Markt.
- 1892 – Rodenbach's novel Bruges-la-Morte published.
- 1899 – Cercle Brugge K.S.V. football club formed.
- 1900 – Bruges derby football rivalry active.

== 20th century ==
- 1905 – Boudewijnkanaal (canal) dug.
- 1907 – Port of Bruges-Zeebrugge opens.
- 1912 – Bruges State Archives established in the Poortersloge.
- 1919 – Population: 53,489.
- 1924 – Victor Van Hoestenberghe becomes mayor.
- 1928 – Hollywood Cinema opens.
- 1930 – Groeningemuseum opens on the Dijver.
- 1953 – Dudzelebrug (bridge) built on the N376 (Sluis-Bruges).
- 1958 – Procession of the Golden Tree revived.
- 1960 – Musica Antiqua Bruges festival begins.
- 1963 – Bruges Provincial Library and Archives established.
- 1973 – Koninklijk Atheneum Vijverhof (school) established in Sint-Michiels.
- 1975 – Jan Breydel Stadium opens.
- 1977 – Frank Van Acker becomes mayor.
- 1982 – Cactusfestival of music begins.
- 1983 – De Karmeliet restaurant in business.
- 1984 – Dampoortbruggen, Bruges (bridges) built.
- 1986 – De Werf cultural centre founded.
- 1987 – 6 March: Ferry Herald of Free Enterprise capsizes in the port.
- 1988 – 20 September: British prime minister gives speech in city.
- 1990 – Brouwerijmuseum Brugge established on the Walplein.
- 1995 – Patrick Moenaert becomes mayor.
- 1998 – Start of annual Tour of Flanders cycling race moves to Bruges.

== 21st century ==
- 2002 – Concertgebouw Brugge opens on the 't Zand, Bruges.
- 2008 – Frietmuseum opens in the Saaihalle.
- 2010 – April: Catholic bishop Vangheluwe resigns.
- 2013
  - Renaat Landuyt becomes mayor.
  - Population: 117,170.

== See also ==
- Bruges history
- History of Bruges
- List of mayors of Bruges
- List of protected heritage sites in Bruges
- Timelines of other municipalities in Belgium: Antwerp, Brussels, Ghent, Leuven, Liège
- History of urban centers in the Low Countries

== Bibliography ==
=== In English ===
- Thomas Nugent (1749), "Bruges", The Grand Tour, vol. 1: Netherlands, London: S. Birt, hdl:2027/mdp.39015030762598
- "Bruges". Gazetteer of the Netherlands. Attributed to Clement Cruttwell. London: G.G.J. and J. Robinson. 1794.
- Abraham Rees (1819), "Bruges", The Cyclopaedia, London: Longman, Hurst, Rees, Orme & Brown, hdl:2027/uc2.ark:/13960/t4vh5t74q
- David Brewster, ed. (1830). "Bruges". Edinburgh Encyclopædia. Edinburgh: William Blackwood.
- "Bruges", Handbook for Travellers in Holland and Belgium (20th ed.), London: John Murray, 1881, hdl:2027/hvd.hn2ha2
- The visitors universal handybook and guide to Antwerp, Brussels, Waterloo, Ghent, Bruges, Liège, etc. etc (5th ed.). Antwerp: John De Wit & Joris. 1884.
- W. Pembroke Fetridge (1885), "Bruges", Harper's Hand-Book for Travellers in Europe and the East, New York: Harper & Brothers
- "Bruges". Chambers's Encyclopaedia. London. 1901. hdl:2027/uc2.ark:/13960/t81j9pj6k.
- Ernest Gilliat-Smith (1909), Bruges, Mediaeval Towns, London: J.M. Dent & Co., OCLC 150311124
- "Bruges", Belgium and Holland, Leipsic: Karl Baedeker, 1910 + 1881 ed.
- "Bruges". Handbook to Belgium and the Battlefields (7th ed.). London: Ward, Lock & Co. 1921. hdl:2027/uc1.$b412881.
- de Roover, Raymond. Money, Banking and Credit in Mediaeval Bruges: Italian Merchant-Bankers Lombards and Money-Changers: A Study in The Origins of Banking (Harvard U.P. 1948)
- "Bruges, the City the Sea Forgot", National Geographic, vol. 107, Washington, D.C., 1955
- Trudy Ring, ed. (1995). "Bruges". Northern Europe. International Dictionary of Historic Places. Fitzroy Dearborn. ISBN 978-1-136-63944-9.
- "Bruges in the Silent Hours", New York Times, 2 March 1997
- Colum Hourihane, ed. (2012). "Bruges". Grove Encyclopedia of Medieval Art and Architecture. Oxford University Press. ISBN 978-0-19-539536-5.

=== In other languages ===
- Marie-Nicolas Bouillet; L.G. Gourraigne (1914). "Bruges". Dictionnaire universel d'histoire et de geographie (in French) (34th ed.). Paris: Hachette. hdl:2027/mdp.39015074817142.
- Henri Zondervan, ed. (1915), "Brugge", Winkler Prins' Geillustreerde Encyclopaedie (in Dutch), vol. 4 (4th ed.), Amsterdam: Uitgevers-Maatschappy "Elsevier", hdl:2027/mdp.39015068310153
