= Brussels metropolitan area =

Brussels metropolitan area: Région métropolitaine de Bruxelles (French); Stedelijk gebied van Brussel (Dutch)
- Metropolitan area
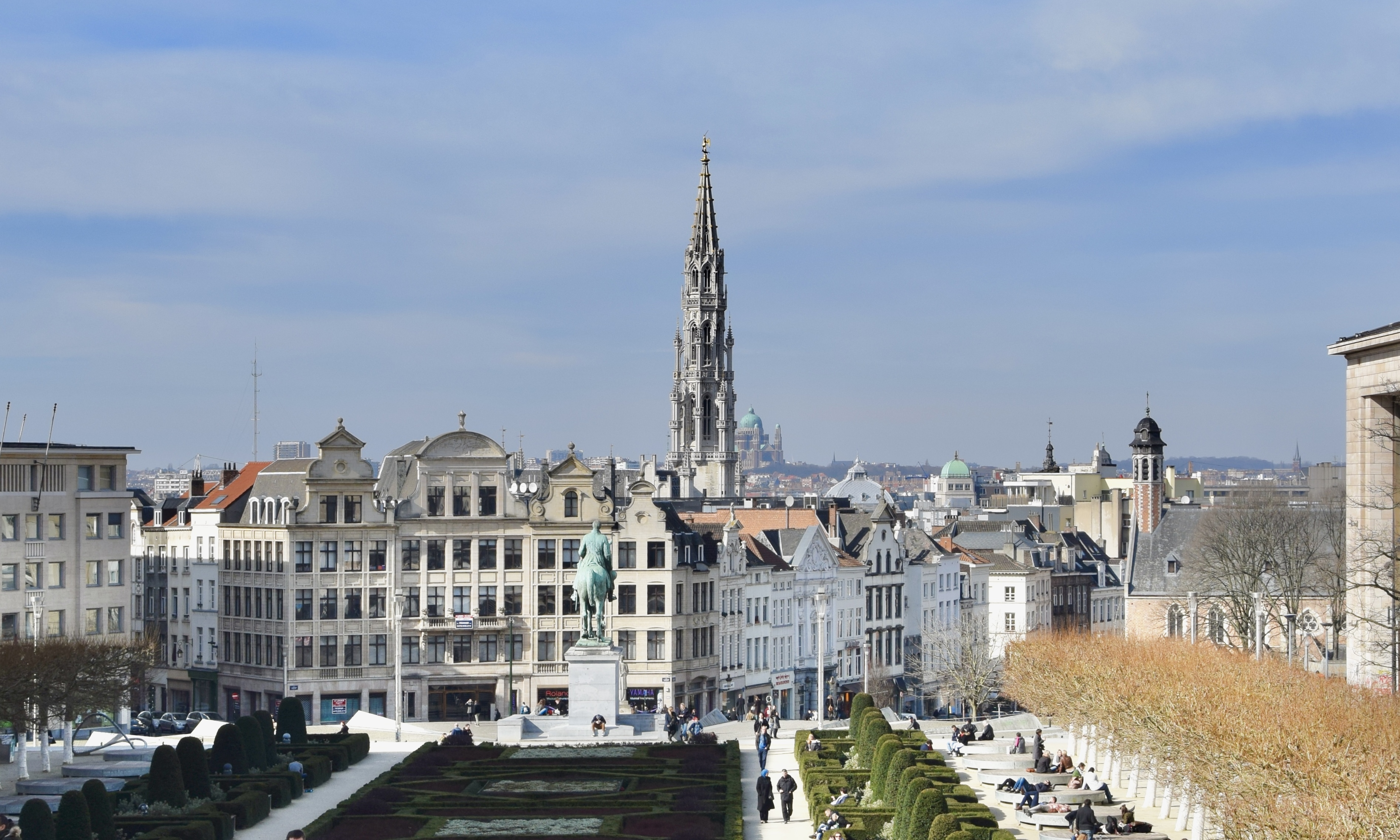
- Skyline of Brussels

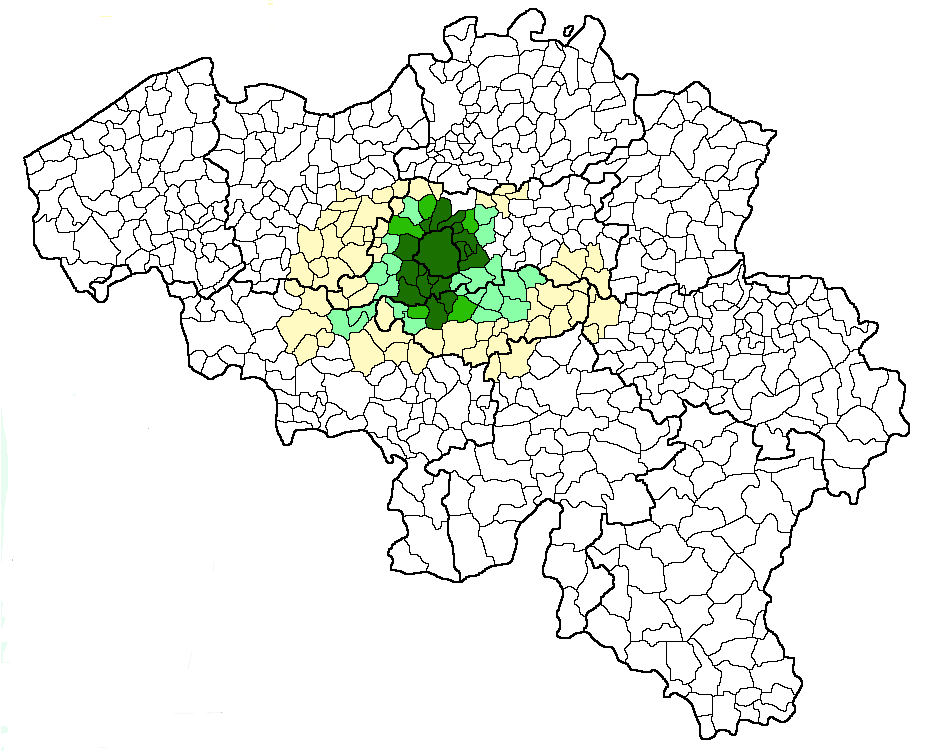
- Brussels metropolitan area: Functional agglomeration (Note: Municipalities with >50% of the population living in the central residential area) Partial agglomeration (Note: Municipalities with <50% of the population living in the central residential area) Suburbs or peri-urban ring (Note: Municipalities adjacent to the agglomeration with a high degree of suburbanisation) Outer commuter area (Note: Municipalities with significant commuter flows towards the urban region (agglomeration and suburbs))
- Coordinates: 50°50′48″N 04°21′09″E
- Country: Belgium
- Largest city: Brussels

Area
  - Metro: 3,377 km^{2} (1,304 sq mi)

Population
  - Metro: 2,784,967
  - Metro density: 824.7/km^{2} (2,136/sq mi)

GDP
  - Metro: €200.457 billion (2021)
- Time zone: UTC+1 (CET)

The Brussels metropolitan area (French: Région métropolitaine de Bruxelles; Dutch: Stedelijk gebied van Brussel) is the metropolitan area of Brussels, Belgium. Covering an area of 3,377 km^{2} (1,304 sq mi), it extends beyond the administrative boundaries of the Brussels-Capital Region to include surrounding municipalities in the Flemish and Walloon regions. It comprises over 2.5 million people, which makes it the largest in Belgium.

The largest cities or towns within the metropolitan area are Brussels, Vilvoorde, Dilbeek, Halle, Braine-l'Alleud and Grimbergen. It is also part of a large diamond-shaped conurbation, extending towards the cities of Ghent, Antwerp and Leuven, as well as the province of Walloon Brabant, in total home to over 5 million people.

== Definitions ==
=== Urban and metropolitan areas ===
Brussels forms the core of a built-up area that extends well beyond the Brussels-Capital Region's limits. Sometimes referred to as the Brussels urban area (French: aire urbaine de Bruxelles, Dutch: stedelijk gebied van Brussel), Brussels metropolitan area (French: région métropolitaine de Bruxelles, Dutch: stedelijk gebied van Brussel) or Greater Brussels (French: Grand-Bruxelles, Dutch: Groot-Brussel), this area extends over a large part of the two Brabant provinces, including much of the surrounding arrondissement of Halle-Vilvoorde and some small parts of the arrondissement of Leuven in Flemish Brabant, as well as the northern part of Walloon Brabant.

The metropolitan area of Brussels is divided into different levels:

- Firstly, the Brussels-Capital Region, comprising 19 municipalities (Anderlecht, Auderghem, Berchem-Sainte-Agathe, City of Brussels, Etterbeek, Evere, Forest, Ganshoren, Ixelles, Jette, Koekelberg, Molenbeek-Saint-Jean, Saint-Gilles, Saint-Josse-ten-Noode, Schaerbeek, Uccle, Watermael-Boitsfort, Woluwe-Saint-Lambert and Woluwe-Saint-Pierre) and forming the urban core. It covers 162 km^{2} (63 sq mi) and has a population of 1,218,255 inhabitants within the regional borders. At its centre lies the City of Brussels, the largest municipality, which is the capital of Belgium.
- Secondly, the functional agglomeration (French: agglomération opérationnelle, Dutch: geoperationaliseerde agglomeratie) and partial agglomeration (French: agglomération partielle, Dutch: gedeeltelijke agglomeratie), which consist of old towns and villages that merged with the expanding city during the 20th century, such as Halle, Vilvoorde, Waterloo and Zaventem. This morphological agglomeration — taking into account the outermost contiguous built-up area — is home to approximately 1.4 million people.
- Adding the suburbs (French: banlieues, Dutch: buitenwijken) or peri-urban ring (French: couronne périurbaine, Dutch: voorstedelijke ring) gives a total population of 1,831,496. This zone has a less urban character but is characterised by a high degree of suburbanisation. It includes municipalities such as Asse, Kortenberg and Wavre. Together with the Brussels Periphery, it forms Brussels' green belt.
- Including the outer commuter area (French: zone résidentielle des migrants alternants, Dutch: forensenwoonzone), the population is 2,676,701. Although located outside the urban area itself, these municipalities rely on the agglomeration and the suburbs for a significant portion of their employment (at least 15% of the active population works there).
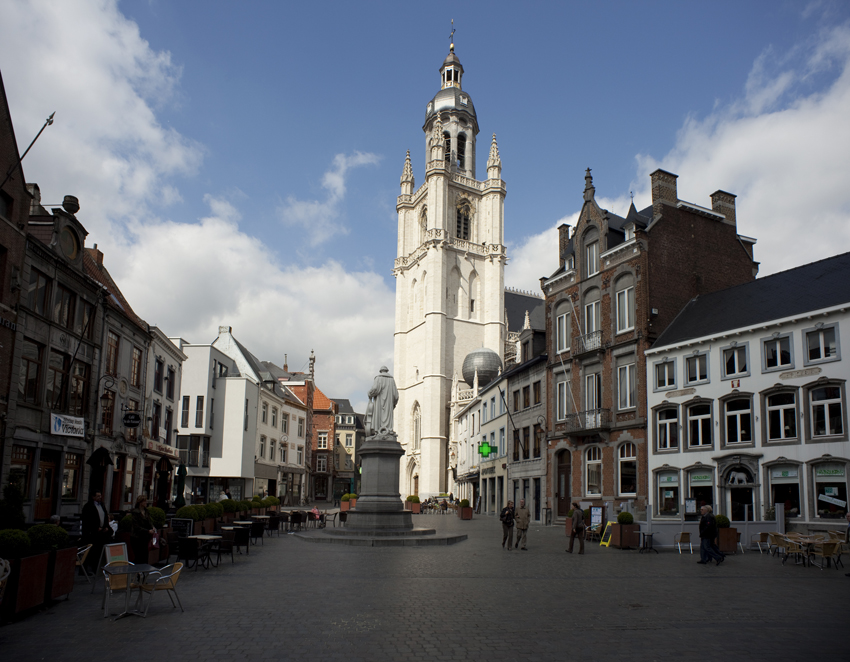
Halle (about 15 km from Brussels' city centre), a southern extension of the agglomeration

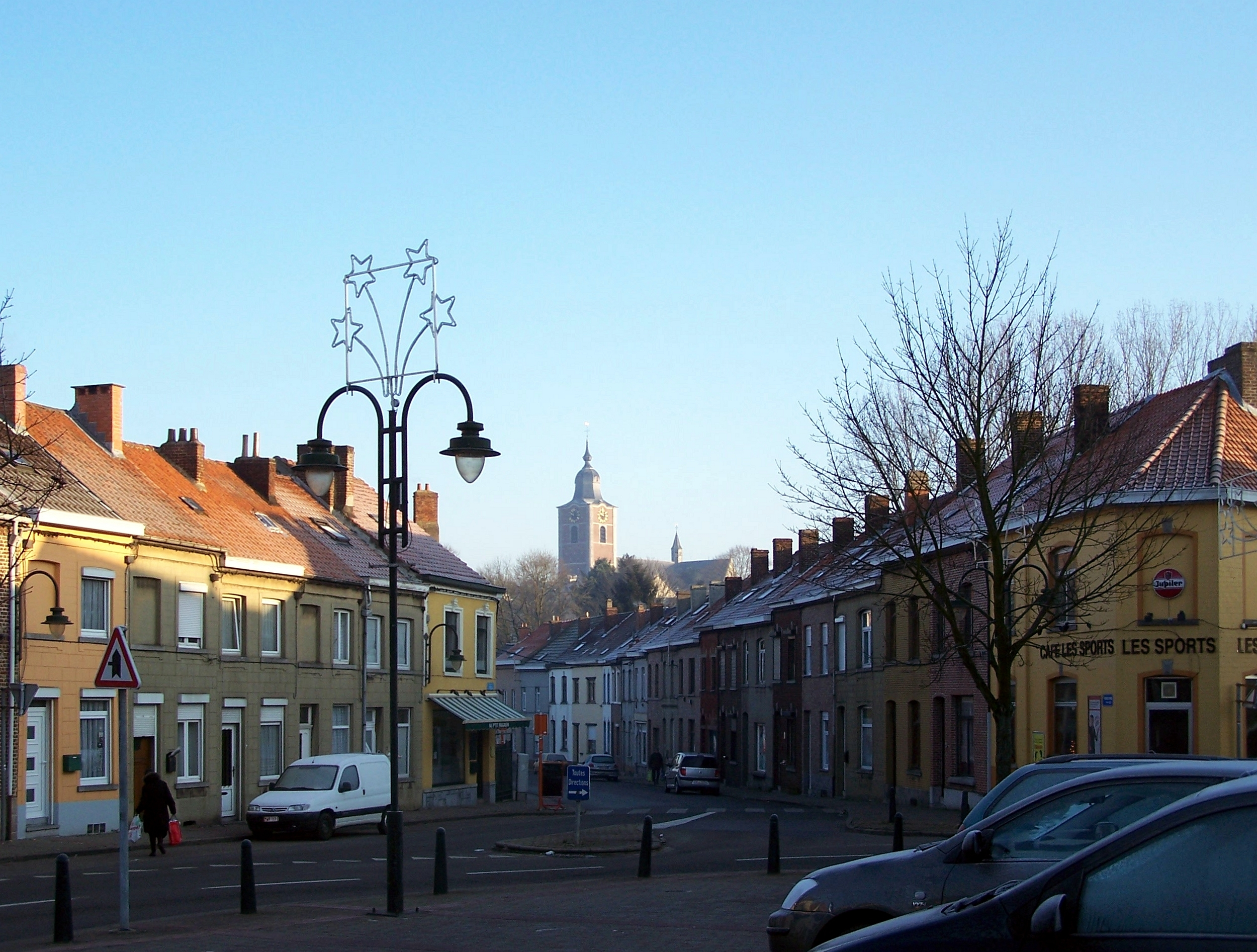
Braine-l'Alleud (about 20 km from Brussels' city centre), a residential suburb

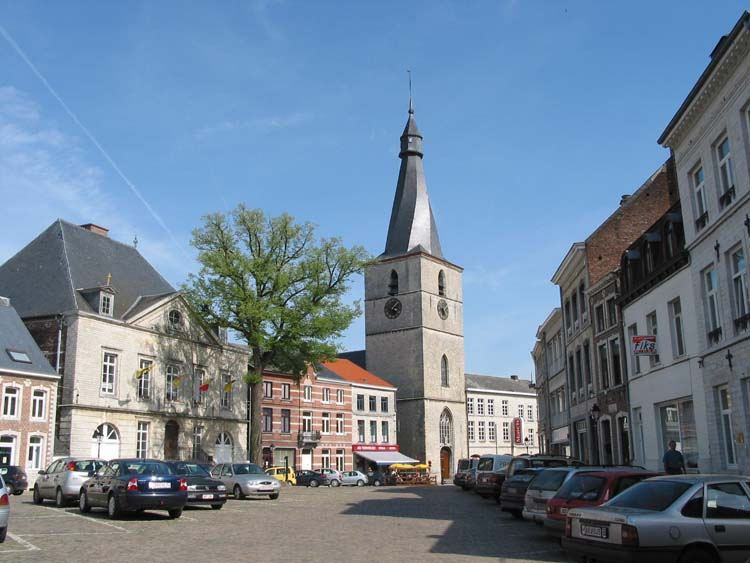
Jodoigne (about 40 km from Brussels' city centre), a commuter town

=== Conurbation ===
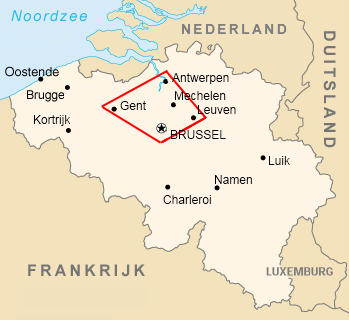
Map of the Flemish Diamond within Belgium

Brussels is also part of a wider conurbation extending towards the cities of Ghent, Antwerp, and Leuven, known as the Flemish Diamond, as well as the province of Walloon Brabant. This area also includes the urban areas of Mechelen, Sint-Niklaas, and Aalst, as well as the small-scale urban areas of Beveren, Boom, Dendermonde, Ninove, Lier, Lokeren, Sint-Katelijne-Waver, Wetteren, and Willebroek. In total, it is home to over 5 million people (a little more than 40% of the Belgium's total population), with a population density of about 820/km^{2} (2,100/sq mi).

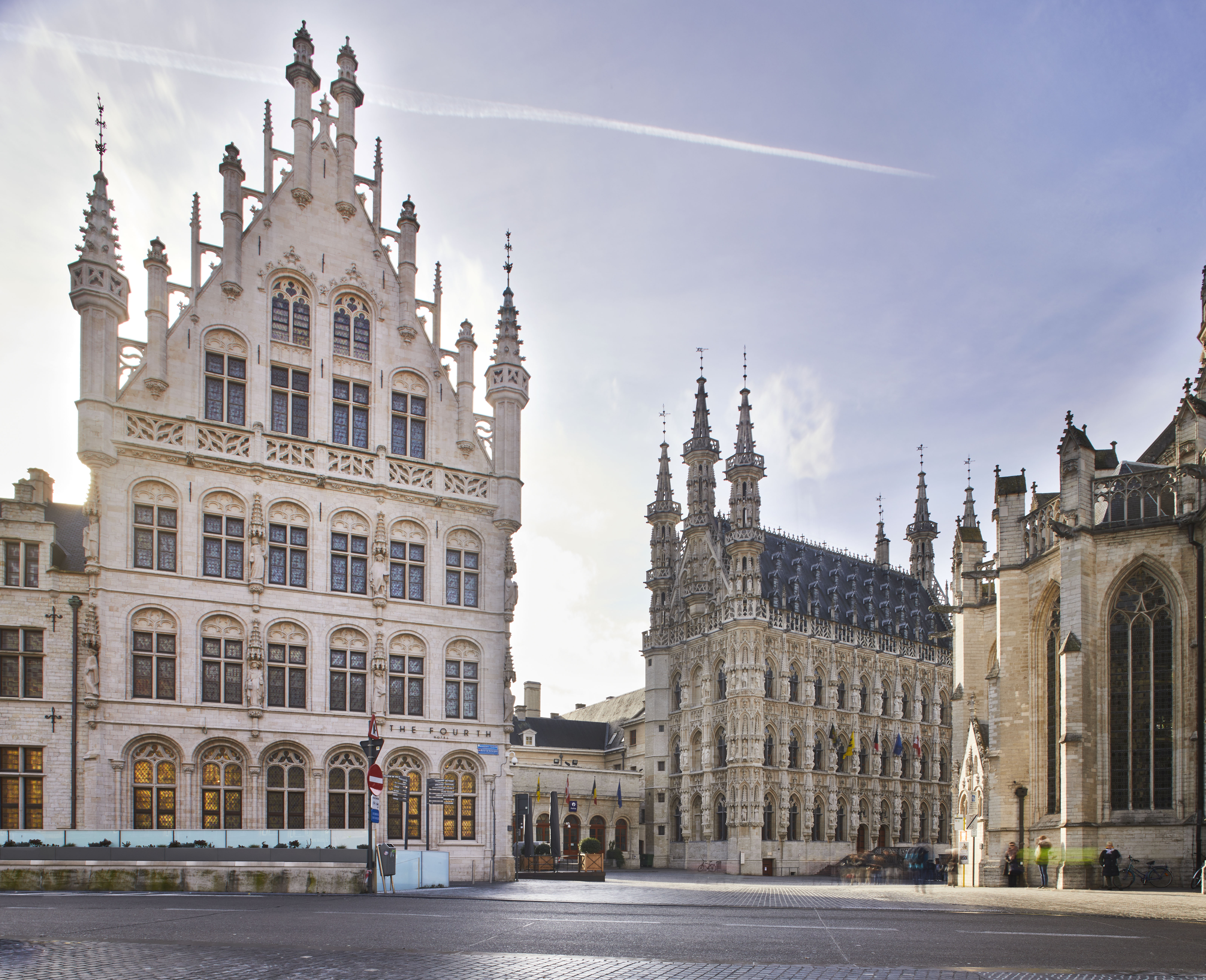
Leuven (about 30 km from Brussels' city centre)

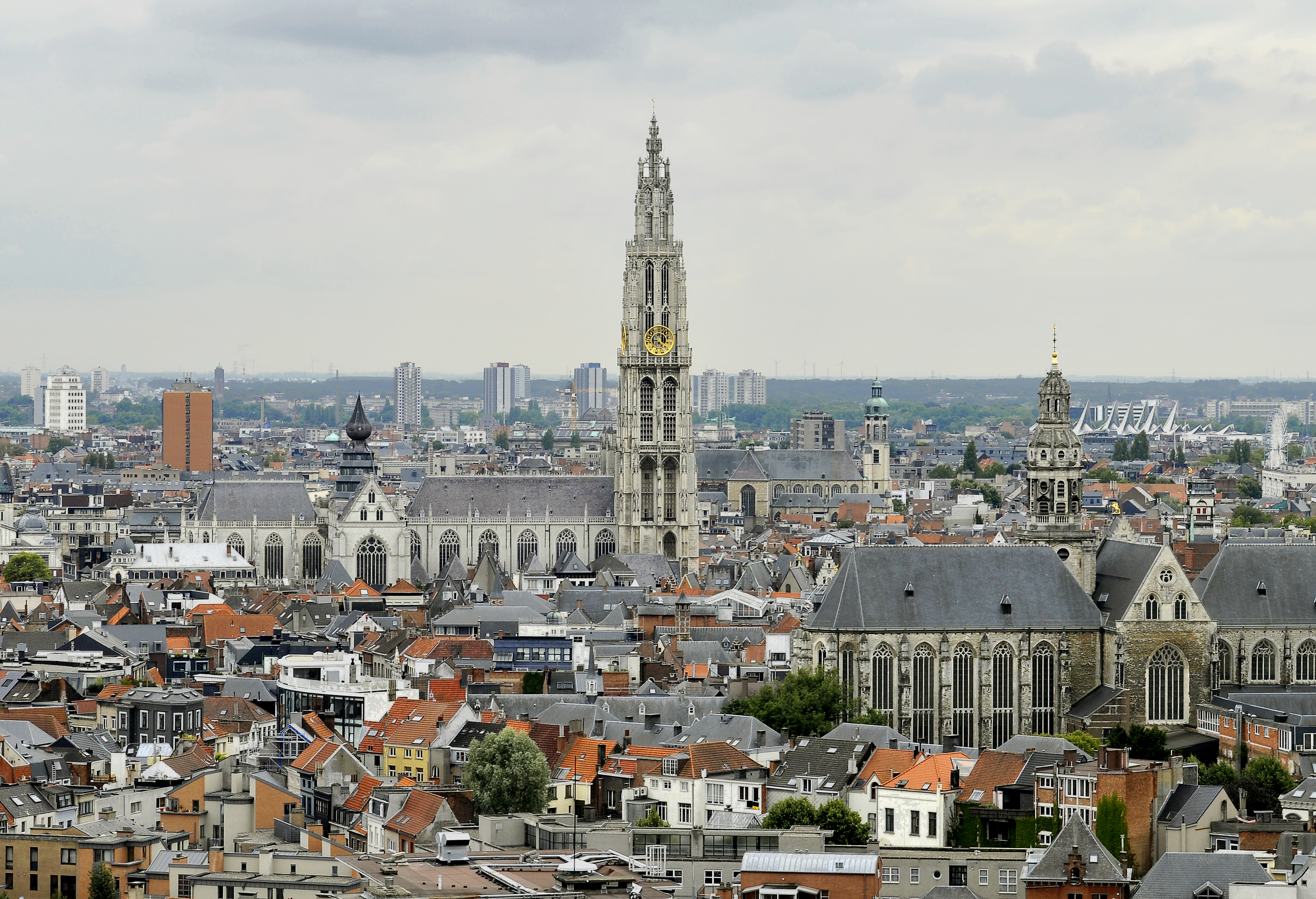
Antwerp (about 50 km from Brussels' city centre)

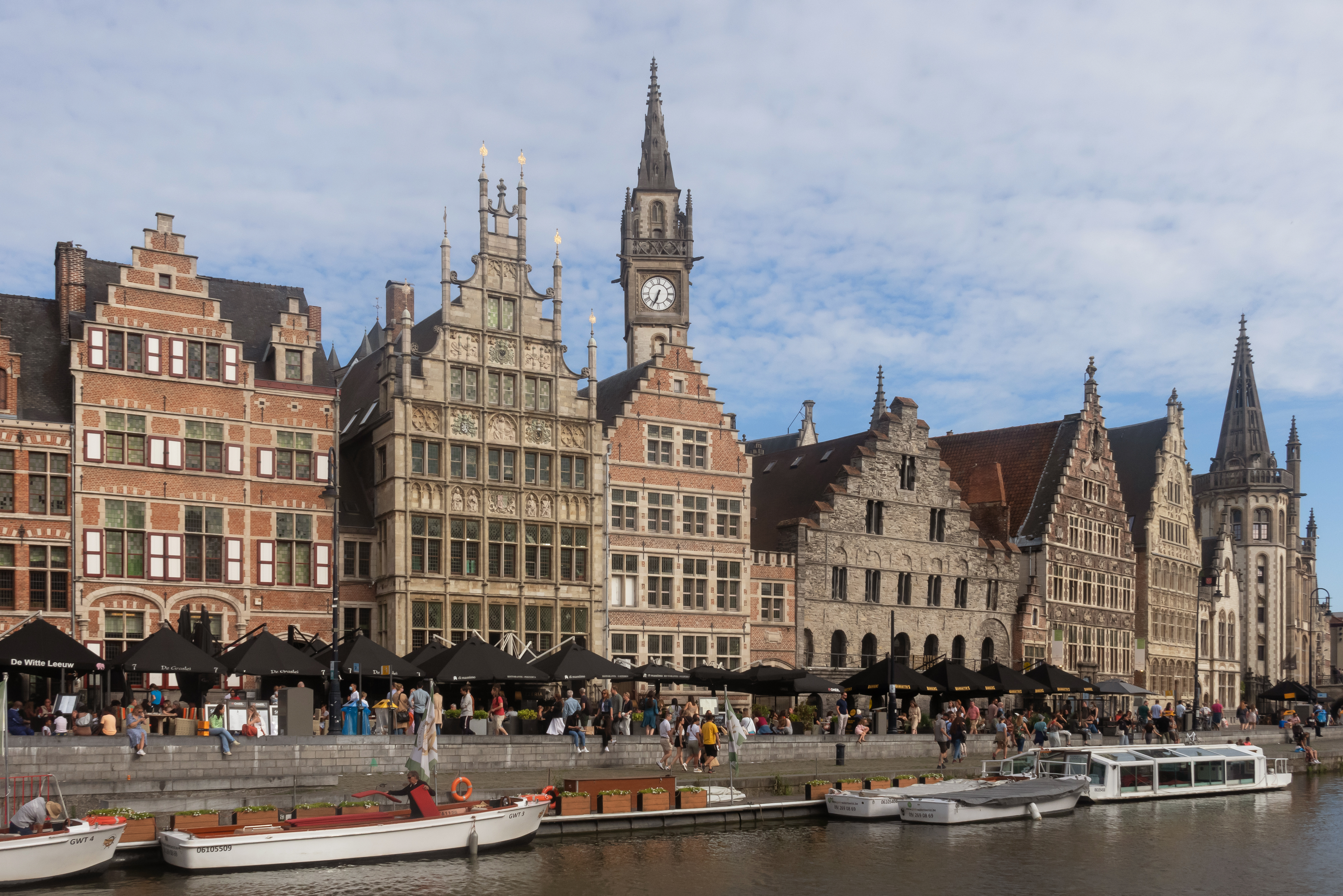
Ghent (about 50 km from Brussels' city centre)

== Economy ==
In 2021, Brussels' gross metropolitan product was €163.3 billion. This puts Brussels in 8th place among cities in the European Union.
