= Peellaert =

Peellaert or de Peellaert is a surname. Notable people with the surname include:

- Anselme de Peellaert (1764–1817), Dutch politician
- Auguste de Peellaert (1793–1876), Belgian playwright, writer and painter
- Guy Peellaert (1934–2008), Belgian artist
