= Philippe Joseph Jean Veranneman de Watervliet =

Philippe Joseph Jean Veranneman de Watervliet (24 July 1761 – 19 November 1815) was a politician and magistrate born in the Holy Roman Empire. His more lasting reputation comes from his contribution to political and legal philosophy, notably as the author of the "Traité de la souveraineté" ("Treatise on sovereignty") published in 1790.

He should not be confused with his nephew and near namesake, the politician most usually identified as Philippe Veranneman de Watervliet (1787–1844). It is probably to reduce the risk of confusion between the two of them that the uncle is generally identified in sources by his full name.

== Biography ==
Philippe Veranneman de Watervliet was born into an aristocratic family, one of the fifteen children of Jean-Joseph Veranneman de Gendbrugge (1733–1808), "Schepen" (loosely, "Alderman") of the Brugse Vrije region in western Flanders. Philippe's mother, born Angélique Françoise Elisabeth de Massiet (1739–1788), had married his father in 1756, and also came from an aristocratic family.

For three years he studied for the priesthood. He then moved on to study at Louvain/Leuven, emerging with a law degree. As early as 1783 he wrote a letter to the new emperor Joseph II in which he offered his proposals for the provision of free education as a way to combat poverty. (The Southern Netherlands was for most purposes part of Austria till 1794/95.) The cost should be charged to "the clergy". Veranneman became an enthusiastic backer of the reforms being driven by Vienna during the 1780s. In 1787 he was recruited as a member of the new (and short-lived) court of first instance for Flanders. On 8 March 1788, still aged only 26, he was appointed a "Schepen" (loosely, "Alderman") of Bruges, an appointment that continued till 17 July 1791.

In response to the French Revolution which broke out in 1789, various smaller revolutions erupted in surrounding regions. One of the most significant was the Brabant Revolution between October 1789 and December 1790, which culminated with the establishment during 1790 of the short-lived United Belgian States ("Verenigde Belgische Staten"). Veranneman participated and was appointed as a regional deputy representing Bruges at the States of Flanders ("Staten van Vlaanderen" assembly) in Ghent. During the ensuing period of upheaval, and through most of the French occupation which followed in 1794, he withdrew from frontline politics, quietly supporting himself as a lawyer in Bruges. It was only in 1812 that he returned to public life, appointed a deputy judge at the court of first instance in Bruges. From this it would appear that, like most of the Flemish nobility, he had by this time reconciled himself to the seeming permanence of the Napoleonic occupation. As matters turned out his judicial position survived the fall of Napoleon in 1814. At that point he lost no time in launching a correspondence with the new régime's Governor-General Vincent, setting forth his ideas for a new constitution. It could not make sense, he argued, to apply a single constitution to both the Protestant Northern Netherlands and to the Catholic Southern Netherlands. As before, he advocated a combination of Enlightenment-based innovations with the preservation of laws and regulations from the pre-revolutionary Ancien Regime, albeit without a return to aristocratic privileges. He was, in particular, keen on regional decentralisation and enhanced autonomy for the provinces. In 1814 he was also appointed alternate king's prosecutor in Bruges. There is speculation over whether or not he might have risen higher up the political hierarchy had he not died, aged just 54, in November 1815.

== Personal ==
Philippe Veranneman never married. He was ambitious and never sought to conceal his ambitions. It was suggested that his forthrightness, arrogance and excessive need to stand out counted against him. He gained a reputation as an incorrigible womaniser.

== Publications ==
Philippe Veranneman's continuing importance for historians of what became Belgium rests chiefly on his authorship of two lengthy political tracts.

The first of these, dated 1790, is entitled "Traité de la souveraineté généralement considérée avec des réflexions pratiques sur le gouvernement" ("Treatise on sovereignty as it is generally understood, with practical reflections on government"). His starting point was Rousseau's social contract. He said that he was also inspired by Montesquieu, Pufendorf and others. Veranneman's ideas (published in this case ten years into the reign of Joseph II) included faith in the emperor, but also included belief in traditional structures of city and district governance, rather than the "enlightenment innovations" that Vienna sought to implement at the local level. In effect, Veranneman thereby found himself in the gap between two sets of beliefs. Both the enlightenment modernisers who took their queue from the emperor and the "ancien regime traditionalists" found elements in his "Traité de la souveraineté ..." that were unacceptable. He ended up being viewed with official suspicion in both Brussels and Vienna: he was unable to find a publisher for the second part of the treatise. His appointment to the States of Flanders ("Staten van Vlaanderen" assembly) was withdrawn in 1791 and again rejected in 1793 after the short-lived Austrian restoration.

The second appeared in 1815. After 1813 the government in The Hague were not indifferent to Veranneman's constitutional ideas. He was one of a small group of constitutional lawyers from the south invited to draft a preliminary proposal for a constitution. In the end other ideas prevailed, however, and the United Kingdom of the Netherlands ended up with a single unitary constitution which at the time was considered progressive (though the south would break away just fifteen years later). Veranneman was dissatisfied with the constitutional settlement of 1815. In order that his own ideas might become better known and, perhaps, yet have an influence, he published a booklet entitled "Projet de constitution pour les provinces de la Belgique, ci-devant Autrichienne" ("Constitution Project for the Belgian provinces, formerly Austrian [provinces]"). However, his earely death left him without very much time to promote and defend his ideas.
