= Patrick Moenaert =

Belgian political scientist and politician (1949–2024)

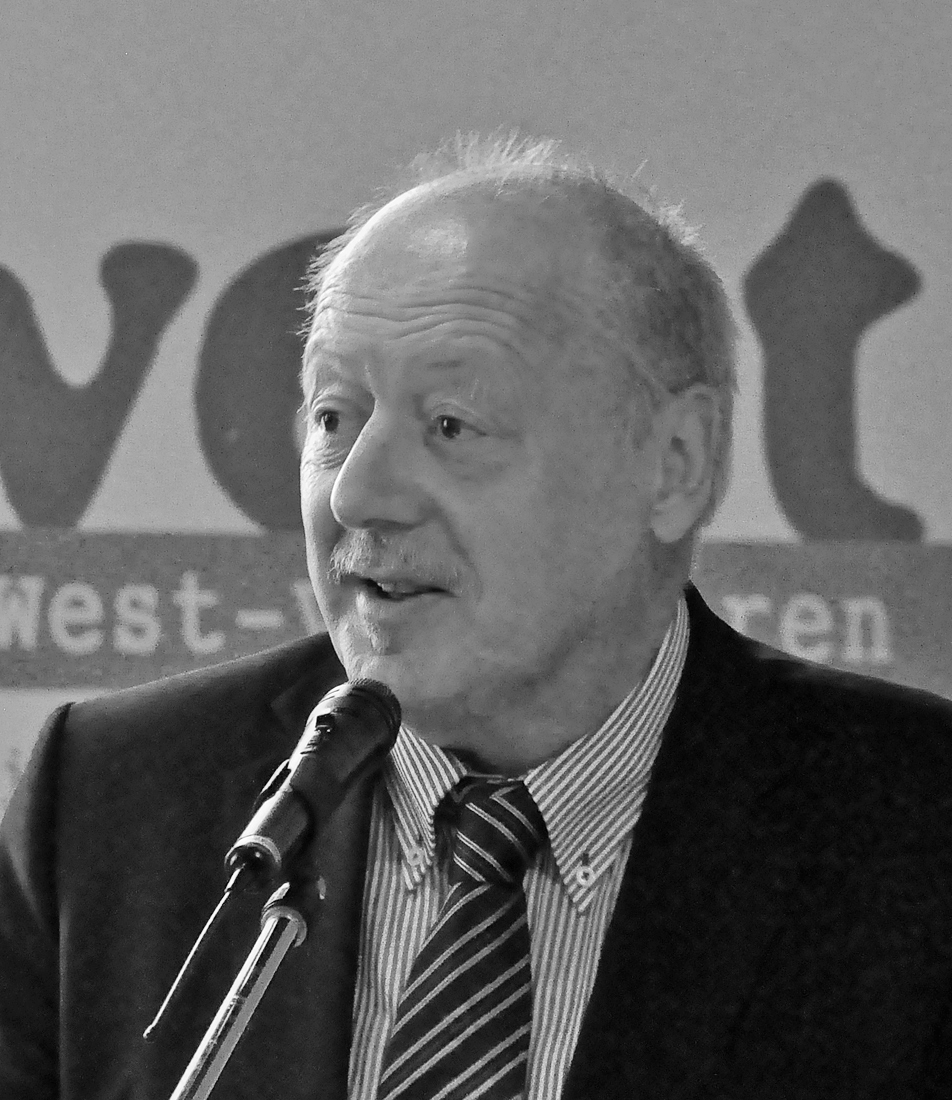
- Moenaert in 2011

Mayor of Bruges
- In office 1995–2012
- Preceded by: Fernand Bourdon
- Succeeded by: Renaat Landuyt

Personal details
- Born: 27 March 1949 Oudenburg, Belgium
- Died: 15 May 2024 (aged 75) Bruges, Belgium
- Party: CD&V
- Education: KU Leuven
- Occupation: Political scientist

Patrick Moenaert (27 March 1949 – 15 May 2024) was a Belgian political scientist and politician of Christian Democratic and Flemish (CD&V).

== Biography ==
Born in Oudenburg on 27 March 1949, Moenaert studied at KU Leuven and began his political career in 1979 upon his appointment as secretary of the cabinet of minister Daniël Coens. In 1982, he was elected to the municipal council of Bruges and became president of the city's Public Centre for Social Welfare in 1988. In 1995, he was elected Mayor of Bruges, a position he held until the 2012 local elections, when he decided not to run again and instead supported Dirk De fauw.

Moenaert died in Bruges on 15 May 2024, at the age of 75.
