= Auguste de Peellaert =

Belgian playwright, writer and painter (1793–1876)

Auguste Philippe de Peellaert (Bruges, March 12, 1793 – Saint-Josse-ten-Noode, April 16, 1876) was a Belgian officer who, after his military career, became a painter, composer, and writer.

== Biography ==
Auguste de Peellaert hailed from an important aristocratic family, members of which had held important offices in Bruges. His father, Anselme de Peellaert, was appointed chamberlain to Napoleon Bonaparte in 1810, and moved with his wife and three children to Paris. Living well above their means, they moved back to Bruges in 1814, where the father died in 1817. From 1809 to 1812 Auguste was boarded in Paris with a man named Lemoine, in the rue Neuve de Berry near the Champs Elysées.

In 1815 he began his military career in the Netherlands army. A family member, Pius de Crombrugghe (secretary in the cabinet of Willem I), got him a commission as sous-lieutenant. He also received support from his maternal uncle, Alexandre van der Fosse, governor of North Brabant (1826–1829) and Antwerp (1830). His brother in law Philippe Veranneman de Watervliet, member of Parliament, was available for support as well.

Peellaert was stationed mainly at Kortrijk, Menen and Doornik, where he became friendly with Albert Prisse, who later became Minister of War. He also made the acquaintance of Lieutenant General Jean Victor de Constant Rebecque, chief-of-staff of the Netherlands Mobile Army. After 1820 he was usually stationed in Ghent and thereafter in Brussels. He rose to become part of the immediate circle of both Constant Rebecque and the Prince of Orange during the months of August and September 1830, but that October he resigned his commission.

After the Belgian revolution, in 1831, Peellaert became a captain in the Belgian army and was stationed in Ghent and in Brussels, where he taught at the topographical institute. He left the army in 1849 with the rank of lieutenant-colonel to dedicate himself to painting, composing music, and writing.

In 1832 he became a member of the board of the Royal Conservatory of Brussels, a position he occupied until 1870. In 1847 he was elected president of the newly founded Société des gens de lettres Belges. In contrast with his brother Eugène de Peellaert he never asked for recognition of his noble status, though he was still frequently listed as "baron". He remained a bachelor; he and his mother were buried in the crypt of the Church of Our Lady in Laeken.

Peellaert was racked by disease in his final years, and his epitaph reflects the disenchantment of that period: Soldat, littérateur, peintre, musicien / J'ai fait un peu de tout sans réussir à rien / J'implore du passant, comme grâce dernière / Pour l'homme un souvenir, pour l'âme une prière ("Soldier, writer, painter, musician, I've done a bit of everything without succeeding at anything. I implore him who passes by to remember the man and to pray for the soul").

== Artist ==
De Peellart was only nine when he began his first drawing lessons in Bruges at the private academy of Jan Karel Verbrugge. During his stay in Paris, he continued his studies in drawing and painting. In 1819, he came into contact with the exiled painter Jacques-Louis David, whose work he could admire at David's studio.

He became above all an accomplished watercolourist. By the time he had retired, working especially between 1849 and 1862, he had set up easel all over Europe, recording views of historic monuments and their surroundings in over two thousand watercolours. The many surviving monuments today bear witness to the accuracy with which he portrayed them.

Over a period of several years, he provided drawings for Voyage pittoresque dans le Royaume des Pays-Bas and Châteaux et monuments des Pays-Bas, lithographed by Jean Baptiste Madou. From 1851 to 1860 he published Souvenirs de Voyage, collections with views from Belgium, France, The Netherlands, and Germany.

In 1863 he offered his 2200 watercolors (half of which were Belgian landscapes) to the Belgian government for 4000 franks. The offer was turned down because no one knew where to house the collection. After his death, most of his watercolors came into the possession of his brother, Eugène de Peellaert, and then his heirs. De Peellaert's last namesake, Denise de Peellaert (1893–1989), wife of Ferdinand Janssens de Bisthoven, donated around a thousand of them to the city museums of Bruges, encouraged by her son Aquilin Janssens de Bisthoven, chief conservator of Bruges' museums. He had a careful inventory made and a major exhibition was held in 1975.

== Composer ==
De Peellaert continued to compose music from his boarding school days in Paris onwards. His talent was promoted by the composer and music-theorist Jérôme-Joseph de Momigny, who gave him lessons in piano and harmony. During his stay in Paris, he was a frequent visitor of its lyric theatres. He became an intimate of the Italian composer Ferdinando Paër (1771–1839), the famous author of Le maître de chapelle.

His first compositions were romances and trios for piano, violin, and cello. In 1814, in the family castle Het Forreyst in Sint-Andries, he produced a musical comedy called Crispin Momie. In that same year he wrote a comical one-act opera, which was never produced.

He published dozens of romances for piano and vocals, and many operas, ten of which were performed in Brussels, with royalty in the audience. He socialized with most of the important composers and musicians of his time, including La Malibran, Niccolò Paganini, and Charles Auguste de Bériot, as well as with politicians and aristocrats such as Charles de Brouckère, Edouard Mercier, and Edouard d'Huart. In De Beriot's private theater he frequently accompanied singers on the piano.

The orchestral scores of the compositions played in the Royal Flemish Theatre in Brussels are held in the Brussels city library. He donated his other musical works to the Royal Conservatory in Brussels.

Among his compositions can be found:

- Religious music (Kortrijk, 1816), including Salve Regina for large orchestra
- Les mariages supposés, comedy (Kortrijk, 1816)
- La rosière de Nevelen, comedy (Kortrijk, 1816)
- l'Heure du rendez-vous opera in one act (Kortrijk, 1817), staged in Ghent in 1819. Dedicated to the King of the Netherlands.
- Le sorcier par hasard ou le souper par hasard, comic opera in one act, (1820), staged in Kortrijk, Bruges and Ghent.
- Agnès Sorel, comic opera in three acts (1822), staged in Brussels in 1824.
- Le Barmécide, opera in three acts (1823), staged in Brussels in 1825.
- Teniers ou les Noces flamandes, comic opera in one act, staged in Ghent in 1826.
- Faust, lyric drama in three acts, libretto by Emmanuel Théaulon, staged in Brussels in 1834.
- Le coup de pistolet, comic opera in one act, staged just once, in 1836 in Brussels.
- Louis de Maele, libretto by Jacques Vanderbelen, originally a comic opera, revised to a grand opera in four acts, a successful production staged in Brussels in 1838.
- Un tour de grand seigneur, comedy in two acts, Royal Park Theatre, 1840.
- Le Barigel, comic opera in one act, based on a poem by van G. Oppelt, Brussels, 1842.
- Le Perruquier de l'Opéra, vaudeville in one act, Théâtre des Nouveautés, Brussels, 1844.
- L'exil d'une princesse, proverbe en un acte, performed on 18 December 1851 on the fourth anniversary of de Société des gens de lettres.
- L'exil d'une princesse, originally titled Un mariage russe, then Un abus de pouvoir and finally Marriage par ordre, staged at the Odéon in Paris (1855).
- Les trois clefs, salon operetta (1855).
- Monsieur et Madame Putiphir, operetta in one act (1857).
- Le jour naissant, overture for choir.
- A Dieu ma dernière pensée, solemn Mass in three parts, with organ accompaniment.
- Les trois rivaux, comédie-proverbe in one act (1849).

== Fiction and drama ==
Besides librettos, de Peellaert also published novels, short stories, and plays.

- Le mort vivant, légende luxembourgeoise, Brussels, z. d.
- La trompette du judgement dernier, vaudeville in one act (1850)
- Le bourreau de Vérone, novel, Brussels, 1854
- Le choix d'un état ou la diplomatie électorale, comedy in three acts (1854).
- Les amis et les ennemis, comedy in three acts (1854).
- Femme et veuve, comedy-vaudeville, 1855
- Orphée aux Champs-Elysées, vaudeville in five acts (1855).
- Olivia ou les suites d'une faute, drama in three acts (1855).
- Au château de Maele, short stories, Brussels (1855)
- A chacun ses devoirs, comedy in one act (1857).
- Les tribulations d'un héritier, vaudeville in one act (1857), Royal Park Theatre.
- Sous la Fronde, comedy, Royal Park Theatre (1858)
- Jeanne de Constantinople, historical drama in five acts, Théâtre national du cirque, 1861
- Oeuvres dramatiques, Arlon, 1863
- Le manchon, 1863
- OEuvres de M. A. de Peellaert, in two volumes: novels and short stories
- Les deux pendus, 1865
- Cinquante ans de souvenirs recueillis en 1866, Brussels, 1867
- Pensées et réflexions d'un solitaire, Brussels, 1869.
- Poésies, 1875

== Bibliography ==
=== Works (to be) cited ===
- Aug. THYS, Historique des sociétés chorales, Gent/Keulen, 1855
- F. J. FETIS, Biographie universelle des musiciens, t. VI, p. 476-477 en Supplément, t. II, p. 31 S., Parijs, 1860 en volgende.
- Bibliographie nationale de Belgique, Brussel,
- Prosper CLAEYS, Histoire du théâtre de Gand, Gent, 1892, t. II, p. 320
- Florimond VAN DUYSE, Auguste de Peellaert, in: Biographie nationale de Belgique, T. XVI, Brussel, 1901, col. 808-812.
- A. JANSSENS DE BISTHOVEN, Akwarellen van Auguste de Peellaert, tentoonstellingscatalogus, Brugge, 1975
- Jean TULARD, Napoléon et la noblesse d'empire, Taillandier, Paris, 1979.
- Willy LELOUP, Auguste de Peellaert, in: Lexicon van West-Vlaamse beeldende kunstenaars, Kortrijk, 1992
- Luc DUERLOO & Paul JANSSENS, Wapenboek van de Belgische Adel, Brussel, 1992.
- Andries VAN DEN ABEELE, De Noblesse d'empire in West-Vlaanderen, in: Biekorf, 2002, blz. 309-332.
- Jaak A. RAU & Joseph CORNELISSIS, Anselme de Peellaert (1764–1817) en het domein 't Foreyst in Sint-Andries, in: Brugs Ommeland, 2005, blz. 195-211.
- Jaak A. RAU, Het geboortehguis van Anselme de Peellaert, in: Brugs Ommeland, 2006, blz. 76-79.
- Jaak A. RAU & Joseph CORNELISSIS, Het graf van Anselme de Peellaert, in: Brugs Ommeland, 2006, blz. 238-240.
- Pierre BRANDA, Napoléon et ses hommes, Paris, Fayard, 2011.
