= Philippe Veranneman de Watervliet =

Philippe Veranneman de Watervliet (3 December 1787 - 9 March 1844) was a politician in the Southern Netherlands. During the period of the United Netherlands he was a member of the Second Chamber in the States General (national parliament). He was also, between 1828 and 1830, the last mayor of Bruges before 1830, when the southern part of the country broke away to form the separate state of Belgium.

== Aristocratic provenance ==
Philippe Jean Ignace Veranneman de Watervliet was born in Bruges. The "Jonkheer" Veranneman came from a leading Zeeland family, known as the "Lords of Watervliet". The earliest surviving record of the family's nobility dates from 1731, when the titled status of Philippe Veranneman de Watervliet's ancestor was confirmed "to the extent necessary" ("voor zoveel als nodig") by the emperor Charles VI. Philippe's father was Jean-Charles Veranneman: his mother, born Emérance Colette Pardo de Fremicourt, was a surviving member of a Spanish family that had been powerful in Bruges during the seventeenth century.

In 1817 he himself married Hortense de Peellaert (1800-1852). Thirteen years his junior, she was a daughter of Count Anselme de Peellaert. The marriage produced four recorded children and a large number of remoter descendants.

Philippe Jean Ignace Veranneman de Watervliet should not be confused with his uncle and near-namesake, Philippe Joseph Jean Veranneman de Watervliet (1761-1815), the politician-philosopher author of "Traité de la souveraineté".

== Biography ==
Veranneman reached adulthood during the later years of the United Netherlands as a region within the First French Empire, and seemed destined for a leading political career within it. In March 1814 he became a member of the provisional administration (forerunner of the Provincial Council) in the Department of Lys. The next year, with the Napoleonic empire widely believed to have been consigned to history, he became a member of the States-Provincial (regional parliament) of West Flanders, a post he would retain till 1828.

In 1817 he became a member of the local council for Bruges, but he resigned from that position the next year, serving as district commissioner for the nearby Torhout district between 1818 and 1820. In 1820 he was appointed a permanent delegate/member of the Provincial-Executive "(Gedeputeerde Staten"). Between 1823 and 1828 he served as district commissioner for Bruges.

In October 1827 he was nominated as mayor of Bruges in succession to Karel Aeneas de Croeser. The appointment became effective early in 1828. That same year the Bruges region nominated him as a member of the Second Chamber in the States General (national parliament), where he represented the West Flanders district between 21 October 1828 and 18 October 1830.

During the crucial days in August and September 1830 he was present not in Bruges, but in The Hague, participating in the parliamentary session of the Second Chamber. When he did return, his loyalty to the new state was doubted in some quarters. His mayoral responsibilities in Bruges had been transferred to his deputy, Jean-Baptiste Coppieters 't Wallant. Although the transfer of powers had been viewed as temporary, Veranneman de Watervliet made no attempt to win them back. He resigned on 22 October 1830 and retired to his manor in Hertsberge, where he later died, aged 56.

== Evaluation ==
It has been suggested that Veranneman was condemned by the Belgian "revolutionaries" who identified him as an "Orangist" (in favour of a return to rule from The Hague). The West Flanders historians Albert De Jonghe and Els Witte cast doubt in this interpretation. In the national Second Chamber Veranneman always remained on the opposition benches. It was on his own initiative, in August 1830, that he petitioned the Dutch king on behalf of the city of Bruges in support of an administrative separation between the northern and the southern Netherlands. Even in July 1830, he was reconfirmed as a member of the chamber by his voters in Bruges, appreciative of his opposition to the old status quo of domination by the north.

The failure to re-elect him as mayor in November 1830 was simply a response to a feeling among the voters (well-heeled citizens of whom, at this stage, there were fewer than 500) that it was time for a change. Veranneman's decision to attend parliament in The Hague during the summer of 1830, when there was revolution much closer to home, reflected his belief that he could be more useful to Bruges by representing his city in the Dutch capital, especially given his confidence in the abilities of his deputy, Jean-Baptiste Coppieters 't Wallant to administer the city in his absence.
