= Flemish Diamond =

Coordinates: 51°3′N 4°18′E

Flemish Diamond Vlaamse Ruit
- Conurbation
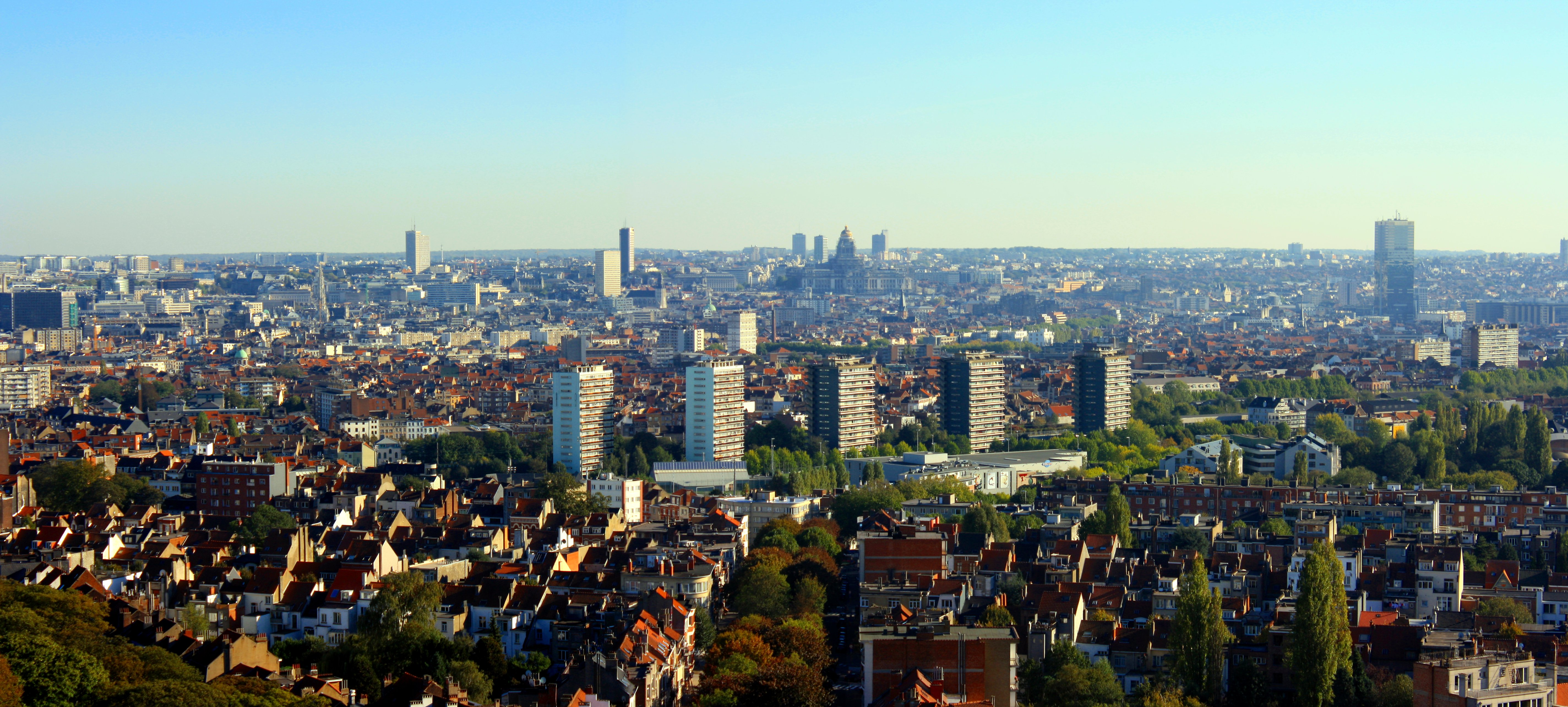
- Brussels, capital and largest city of Belgium

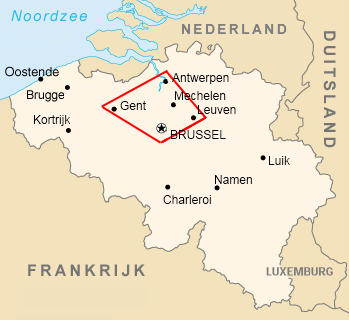
- Country: Belgium
- Regions: Flanders; Brussels
- Largest cities: Antwerp; Brussels; Ghent; Leuven

A map of the Flemish Diamond within Belgium.

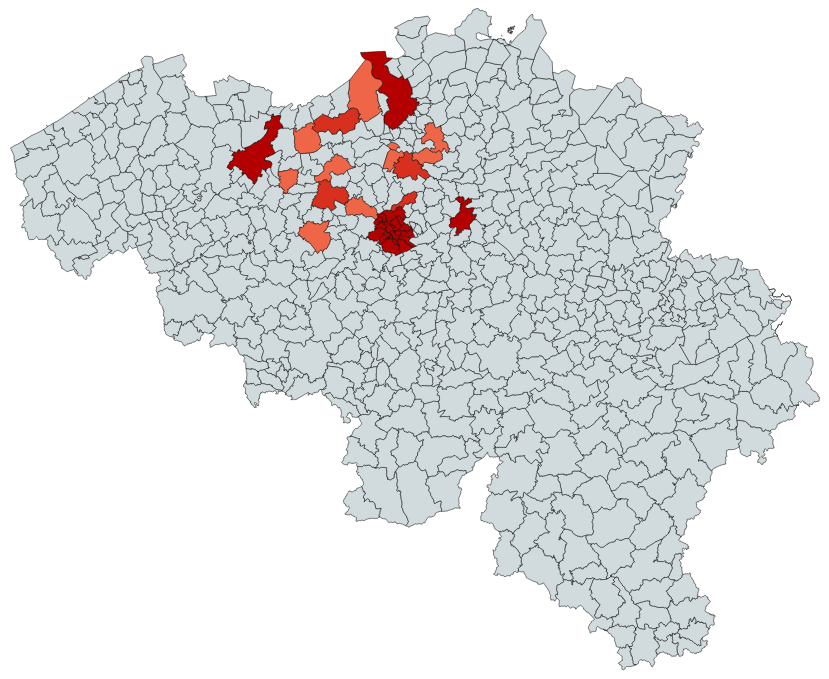
Map highlighting the cities and other urbanized municipalities within the "Flemish Diamond".

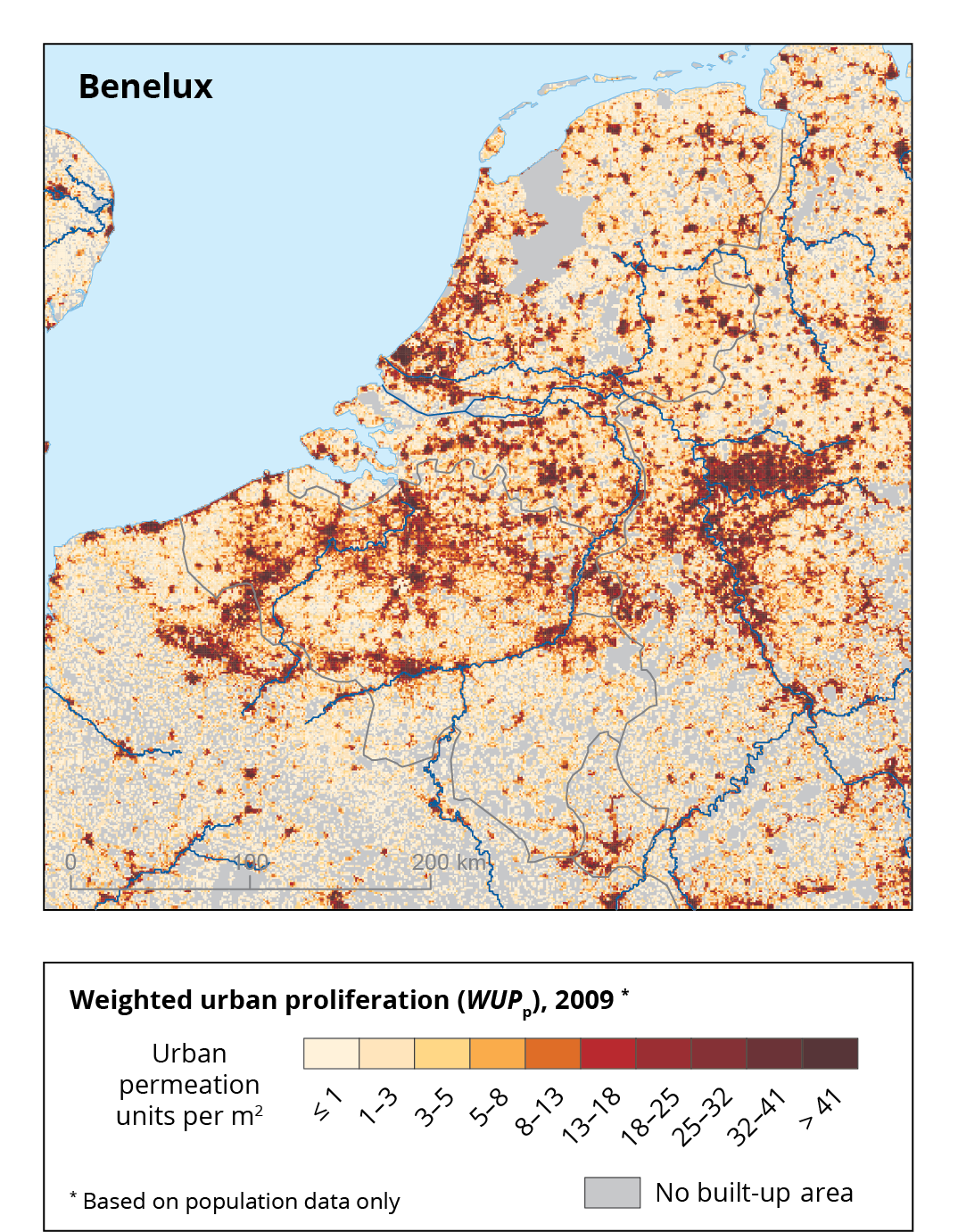
The Flemish Diamond has a high degree of urban sprawl.

The Flemish Diamond (Dutch: Vlaamse Ruit) is the Flemish reference to a network of four metropolitan areas in Belgium, three of which are in the central provinces of Flanders, together with the Brussels-Capital Region. It consists of four agglomerations which form the four corners of an abstract diamond shape: Brussels, Ghent, Antwerp and Leuven.

In 2007, approximately 5 million people lived in this area, with a population density of about 820 per square kilometer which accounted for roughly 47% of the total population of the country (c. 10.5 million).

== History ==
The Flemish Diamond is a regional government concept not officially recognized by the Belgian central authority, the Federal government, which recognizes no poly-centric conurbation in Belgium that crosses regional borders and includes Brussels as part of it. The other major Belgian metropolitan areas that are in relative proximity to the national capital (that lie within a radius of approximately 50 kilometres (31 mi) around Brussels) are the exclusive competence of the regional authorities. These autonomous authorities may choose to include or exclude Brussels in their own volition. And as such, the autonomous Flemish government developed the geographic and socio-economic concept of Vlaamse Ruit or "Flemish Diamond" in the 1990s. The Francophone counterpart is the Triangle Wallon ("Walloon Triangle"), consisting of Brussels and three Walloon metropolitan areas, namely Mons, Charleroi, and Namur.

== Dynamics ==
The distance from Antwerp to Brussels is approximately 51 km (32 mi). The city of Mechelen is in the middle, and towards Brussels the industrial area of Vilvoorde. With the Port of Antwerp stretching to the north, this has long been recognized as a major north–south urban and industrial axis. The western triangular area of the larger cities of Antwerp-Brussels-Ghent comprises the cities of Lokeren located west of Sint-Niklaas, Dendermonde north of Aalst as well as the industrial area Boom – Willebroek, and is generally slightly less urbanized. Such may also be true for the smaller eastern Antwerp – Brussels – Leuven triangle, comprising the city of Lier.

The name refers to the geometrical shape of a diamond, corresponding to the location of the four cities and surrounding metro areas, which are among the most urbanized and industrialized – and prosperous — in Belgium. It has strong economical ties with the metropolitan regions of the Randstad in the Netherlands, and Rhine-Ruhr in Germany. It also links its peripheral area for more than a hundred kilometers, exceeding Flanders, to the international and global economy.

The economic activities in the relatively larger metropolitan areas are distinct, with an emphasis on industry in Antwerp, mainly because of its major port, versus on administration for Brussels, as Belgian capital and its function for the European Union and NATO. Though the centrally located city in both the Diamond and its major north–south industrial axis has two industrial zones within the municipal boundaries, Mechelen is also seen as a commuter town for its many commuters to those cities.

Apart from Hasselt University in Limburg, all the Flemish universities are located at the provincial or national capitals at each corner of the Diamond, while Mechelen plays an important role because of its other types of higher education. Though a distant affiliate of the Catholic university of Leuven offers the first few years of some bachelors in Kortrijk, for higher degrees the University of Ghent is the nearest for the province of West Flanders, as it lies outside the Flemish Diamond.

== See also ==
- Sillon industriel, Wallonia's urban belt
- Metropolitan areas in Belgium
- Blue Banana
