= Karel Aeneas de Croeser =

Karel de Croese
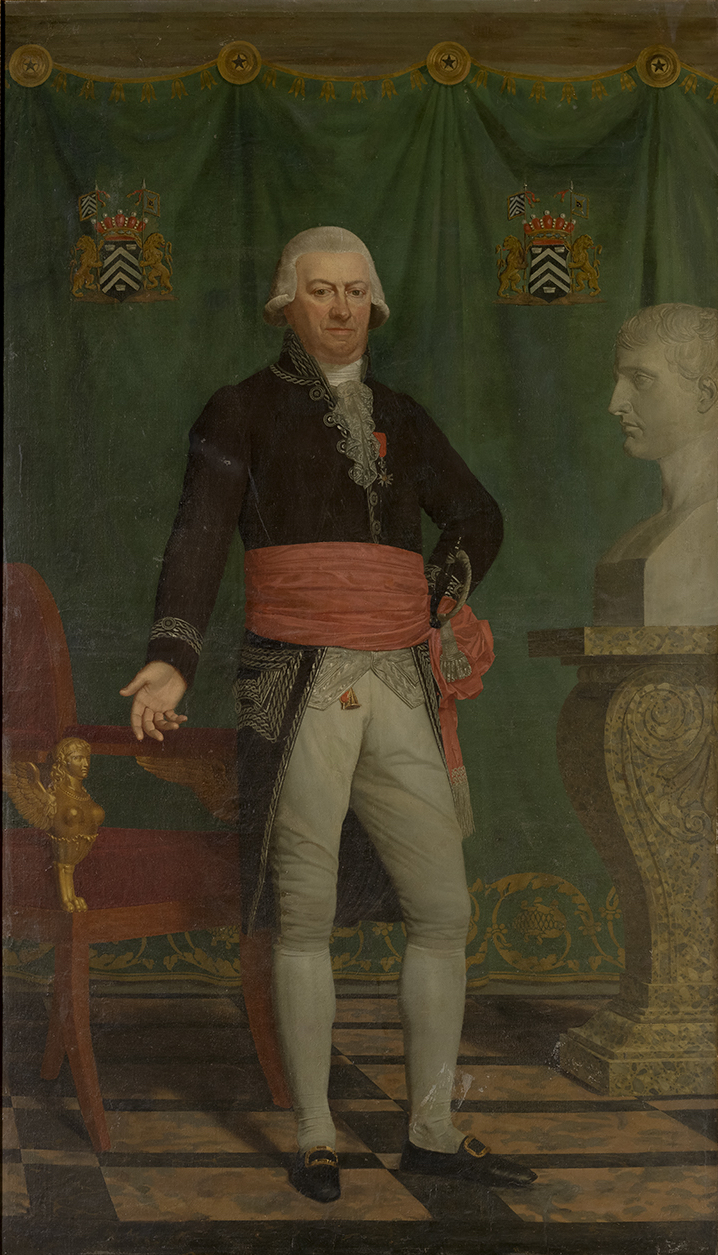
- Karel Aeneas de Croeser, burgemeester van Brugge Franciscus Joseph Octave van der Donckt, 1809
- Born: Karel Aeneas Jacobus de Croese; 14 July 1746; Bruges, Austrian Netherlands
- Died: 22 January 1828 (aged 81); Bruges, United Netherlands
- Education: University of Leuven
- Occupations: Departmental Council chairman Mayor of Bruges; Poet; Genealogist
- Spouse: Anna de Carnin de Staden (1747-1803)
- Children: Charles Joseph Ange de Croeser (1778 — 1857) * Jean Louis Enée de Croeser (1780 — 1849) * Louis-Vincent de Croeser (1783 -) and at least one other son

Karel Aeneas Jacobus de Croeser (Charles-Enée-Jacques de Croeser) (14 July 1746 — 22 January 1828) was Mayor of Bruges (Brugge) between 1803 and 1813, and again between 1817 and 1827. He was the first person to be elected the post of Mayor after the contentious establishment of the United Kingdom of the Netherlands in 1815. He was previously known as a poet and genealogist.

== Biography ==
de Croeser's father, Karel Jozef de Croeser (1701-1775), was an army officer. His father and his mother, Marie Charlotte Stochove (1724-1774), both came from prominent Flemish families. He was born in Bruges at a time when almost the entire southern part of the Netherlands was flourishing economically as a semi-detached Austrian province.

=== Early years ===
de Croeser was educated by Augustinians in Bruges and studied for a degree in Law at the (not yet split) University of Leuven in Brussels. In January 1792 he returned to Bruges and embarked on a career in public administration. He worked as a municipal "Schepen" (sometimes translated as "magistrate") in almost the last city administration to be appointed before the region was over-run by French revolutionary "citizen armies". He disappeared for three years, resurfacing in 1797 in Bruges as a member of the departmental council for the recently created department of Lys, which was now in a greatly enlarged version of France. The departmental council quickly became indistinguishable, in terms of its membership and principal activities, from its Ancien Régime precursor. In 1802 de Croeser began a lengthy incumbency as chairman of the departmental council.

=== Mayor of Bruges ===
He was appointed Mayor of Bruges in 1803 and remained in the post for ten years until 1813. His successor retired in 1817 and de Croeser returned to the post, serving another ten years before retiring in 1827.

The arrival of French revolutionary invaders in 1794 marked the start of a new age of government-mandated secularism, and de Croeser did much for the city. In 1800 he organised the removal of the great bell from the Church of Our Lady ("Onze-Lieve-Vrouwekerk") and had it rehung in the city's belfry, and he provided other additions and enhancements to the bells that regulated business and life in the city. He had a large statue of the Virgin Mary placed in the empty niche above the entrance to the belfry, to replace one that had been destroyed in the French Revolution a few years earlier. He had the Boeveriepoort (city gate) rebuilt in 1811. He also, in 1819, reinvigorated the "Noble Fraternity of the Holy Blood", after two decades of suppression.

He also organised development of the city's "Central Cemetery", a short distance outside the walls along the route towards Oostkamp. The first burial there had taken place in 1787, but citizens had been reluctant to bury their dead outside the confines of the city. In 1804, under de Croeser, burials within the city walls were ended. Prominent families were encouraged to set an example and he had a special mausoleum constructed for the bodies of leading citizens, in which he was later interred himself.

== De Croeser and Napoleon ==
On 11 July 1803, De Croeser welcomed First Consul Napoleon to Bruges. De Croeser was not impressed by Napoleon, and was later reprimanded by the prefect for having the flag on the belfry lowered before Bonaparte had left the city. The visit was commemorated with a painting of De Croeser and Napoleon together by portraitist Joseph Denis Odevaere, completed in 1807. The painting still hangs in the city hall as of 2020. At the time of Odevaere's commission, a portrait of De Croeser, possibly a preliminary study for another work, was already available. Odevaere incorporated this existing portrait into his new composition by cutting it out and sewing it onto the new canvas. By Napoleon's next visit to Bruges, a more impressive portrait of De Croeser by Van der Donckt had been produced, which also reportedly hangs in the city hall as of 2020.

In 1804, Napoleon crowned himself Emperor. During his second visit to Bruges in 1810, he awarded De Croeser the Legion of Honour. The double portrait in the city hall was subsequently amended to display the relevant insignia on De Croeser's coat.

== Homes ==
De Croeser owned a substantial house in the Gouden-Handstraat (literally "Golden Hand street"), but for much of each year he lived out of town at Ten Berge, a large castellated manor house a short distance outside the city to the north. He owned an extensive library and family archive, which included much written material from the sixteenth century historian Nicolaas Despars, some of which was later re-published during the nineteenth century. The archive also included the De Hooghe manuscript and the Gruuthuse manuscript. He had a large collection of ancestral portraits.

== Family ==
Karel-Aeneas de Croeser married Anna de Carnin de Staden (1747-1803) in 1777. They had four sons, two of whom married and became patriarchs in their own right The family line is believed to have died out with the death of Alexandre de Croeser (1839 - 1903), who married Euphémie de Ruysscher (1835-1911). Their only child was stillborn.

== Publications (selection) ==
As well as being a Latin-language poet, de Creuser produced a number of extensive works on genealogy, which he published independently:

- Abrégé généalogique de la parenté de messire Michel Drieux, dit Driutus, Brugge, 1785
- Généalogie de la très noble et très ancienne famille de Stochove, originaire de la Province de Gueldres (…), Brugge, 1790
- Epitaphes, memoires et inscriptions sepulcrales de la famille de Croeser, originaire de la province de Zélande, anciennement comprise dans la noblesse chevalereuse de l’Isle de Walcheren, Brugge 1790, groot folio, 30 p.
- Histoire généalogique de la famille De Croeser et de plusieurs autres familles nobles qui lui sont alliées, Brugge, z.d. (a compilation of a number of separate studies)
- Généalogie ascendante de Jeanne de Marivoorde, dame de Berges, deuxième épouse de Jean de Croeser, Bruuge, z.d.
