= Renaat Landuyt =

Belgian politician (born 1959)

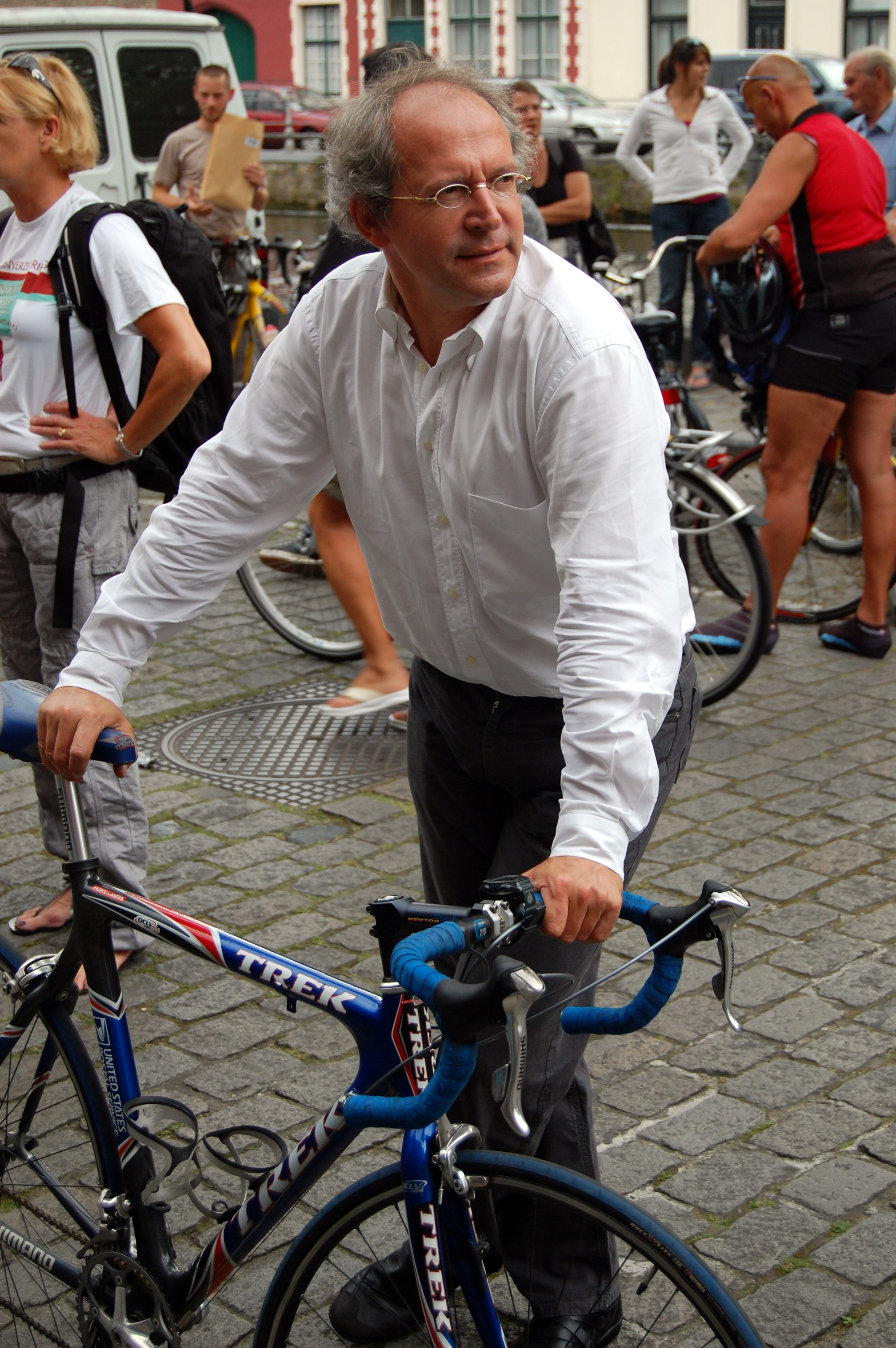

Vice-Minister-President of Flanders Acting
- In office 5 June 2003 – 11 June 2003
- Preceded by: Patrick Dewael
- Succeeded by: Bart Somers

Mayor of Bruges
- In office 2013–2019
- Preceded by: Patrick Moenaert
- Succeeded by: Dirk De fauw

Personal details
- Born: 28 January 1959 (age 67) Ypres, West Flanders, Belgium
- Party: Socialist Party - Different
- Website: Official website

Renaat Julien Landuyt (born 28 January 1959) is a Belgian socialist politician. He was a member of the former sp.a, now Vooruit.

Renaat Landuyt became a licentiate in law in 1982 and has been an attorney since then. He was first elected to the Belgian House of Representatives in 1991, where he served until 1999. From 1995 to 1999 he served as a quaestor of the House. He served as secretary of the parliamentary investigation into the Dutroux Affair.

After the 1999 general elections Landuyt became Flemish minister of Labour and Tourism. After Steve Stevaert resigned from the Flemish government in 2003, Landuyt took over his portfolio of Deputy Minister-President on top of his own Minister of Labour and Tourism for the remainder of the term. After the regional elections of 2004, Landuyt left the Flemish government to become Minister of Transport in the federal government (2004–2007). He was elected again to the Belgian Parliament in June 2007 and after the establishment of the Leterme I Government took up his seat, in 2010 he was re-elected.

He was mayor of Bruges from 2013 to 2019.

Political offices
Preceded by Patrick Moenaert	Mayor of Bruges; 2013–2019	Succeeded by Dirk De fauw
Preceded by Patrick Dewael	Vice-Minister-President of Flanders; Acting; 2003	Succeeded by Bart Somers
