= Anselme de Peellaert =

Dutch politician (1764–1817)

- Born: 23 November 1764; Bruges, Austrian Netherlands
- Died: 14 January 1817 (aged 52); Bruges Netherlands
- Occupation(s): Politician; Colonel in the National Guard
- Spouse(s): Isabelle de Ghistelles, countess of Affaitati (1770–1853)
- Children: 4

Anselme de Peellaert (23 November 1764 – 14 January 1817) was a nobleman from Bruges.

He played a role in politics locally during the revolutionary period that struck Flanders during the closing decades of the eighteenth century, and during the years of the Consulate and French Empire that followed. He was an admirer of Napoleon and relocated to Paris in 1810. Here he ran up debts and ran out of money.

== Family background ==
The Baron Anselme Marie Jean Ghislain de Peellaert, lord of Westhove and Ten Poele, came from a family that had been ennobled in 1693. The earliest of his line to be promoted was Anselme's great grandfather, Jean-Charles Peellaert (1662–1727), lord of Steenmaere, and originally from Steenkerke.

Anselme's grandfather was Jean Peellaert (1694–1752), who married Thérèse de Bie.

His parents were Jean-Nicolas de Peellaert (1734–1792) and his wife, born Thérèse Coppieters (1738–1792). Jean-Nicolas was the lord of Steldershove and Ten Poele. He was a hereditary knight, and in 1785 he received the hereditary title of "Baron". He was a city councillor in Bruges from 1756 till 1765 and an alderman from 1768 till 1788. 1788 was a year of significant political upheaval, and his mandate was not renewed. In 1790, during the course of the Brabant Revolution, he became sheriff of Bruges and its surrounding district while his son, Anselme, became an alderman. However, when the Austrians returned to the city in 1791, father and son were both sidelined, which served to build their dislike of the imperial power traditionally in control of the entire province.

== Life ==
=== Politics in a period of changes ===
Anselme de Peellaert initially held public office, albeit briefly, in 1790, as an alderman in Bruges. After his civic career had been cut short by the Austrians he took a growing interest in the French Revolution, visiting Paris several times during the early 1790s. He became a strong advocate for the "new thinking", and greeted with enthusiasm the arrival of French revolutionary troops in Bruges during November 1792. He became a leading force in the local Jacobin Club, and played a decisive role in the decision to remove all the statues that decorated the facade of the fourteenth century city hall, because these were symbols of the derided Ancien Régime. During the brief (and final) period of Austrian government in Flanders he kept out of politics, but the Austrians were again pushed out of Bruges by the revolutionary forces from France in June 1794.

By 1797 his politics had evidently become less radical. In April he was elected a member of the Bruges communal council. This was the first council since the French had taken over that was not simply nominated by the invaders, and the composition of the Bruges electorate was restricted to an essentially conservative group of notables. De Peellaert was nominated Commissioner of the Directorate in this new council. Six months later, however, in November 1997 the communal council and their commissioner, considered "too reactionary", were ejected, to be replaced by a group of uncompromising Jacobins.

De Peellaert was able to return to politics under the Consulate. Incorporation of the former Austrian Netherlands into an expanded French state had been followed by comprehensive regional government reform: Bruges had in 1795 become the administrative capital for the Department of Lys. In 1799 De Peellaert was appointed to the Lys regional council, becoming its chairman in 1806. From 1800 he was also president of the departmental electoral college.

=== Imperial preferment ===
In 1809 he took over as commander of the National Guard for Bruges. In May 1810 the city was honoured with a visit by Napoleon and his new empress. Anselme De De Peellaert commanded the Guard of honour. Later he was invited to dine at the emperor's table and promoted to the rank of Officer in the Legion of Honour. The encounter with the emperor must have gone well, because on 15 August 1810 he was appointed a Chamberlain to the Emperor. With his family he relocated to Paris where on 27 September 1810 he was further rewarded, under the new honours system, with appointment as a Count of the Empire.

=== Financial overstretch and failure ===
One condition stipulated for a Count of the Empire was that he should have an income of at least 30,000 francs. In France as in Britain, the increased use of various forms of paper money to fund the European War led to currency depreciation, which makes it particularly hard to impute a modern equivalent value to the requirement, but it does appear that in De Paellaert was enjoying a life style that he could not afford. This was a normal condition for many of Napoleon's courtiers: the endlessly devious Talleyrand himself was under financial pressure during this period. The assumption at court was that when the time came the emperor would help his loyal servants expunge their debts. However, for De Peellaert as for many others, when the time came it was the emperor himself who had problems. By now massively outnumbered on the battlefield by their enemies, the French surrendered Paris at the end of March 1814 and their emperor was exiled to Elba, off the coast of Tuscany.

De Peellaert returned, pursued by creditors, to Bruges, where he had more creditors. Here his home, the "House of Seven Towers" in the main street had been transformed at great expense into a small empire style palace. Just outside the old city walls on the south side of town at Sint-Andries he was having a larger empire-style palace constructed where he had hoped to be able to receive The Emperor. He had made additional property purchases from sites taken over from the church, including the Saint Godelina Abbey at Gistel. He had already been forced by his indebtedness to dispose of the abbey in Gistel by the end of 1815.

Soon afterwards, at the start of 1817, Anselme De Peellaert died, aged just 52. His widow and children left town.

== Personal ==
Anselme De Peellaert married Isabelle de Ghistelles, countess of Affaitati in 1788. Her parents were Eugène van Gistel and Marie-Jeanne de la Coste, which meant that she came from one of the leading families of nobility in Flanders. Immediately after they were married they frequently used the name "van Peellaert-Ghistelles". However, as the impact of the revolution spread, aristocratic titles were abolished and the family name used by Anselme again became De Peellaert.

The marriage produced four recorded children of whom one died in infancy and three survived till adulthood.

- Eugène de Peellaert, born in 1790, eventually returned to Bruges, recovering the "barony" in 1822 and becoming a leading citizen in the area.
- Auguste de Peellaert, born in 1793, became something of a polymath, remembered as a soldier, a novelist, a painter and a composer.
- Jeanne de Peellaert was born in 1793 and died the next year.
- Hortense de Peellaert was born in 1800. She "married well". Her husband, Philippe Veranneman de Watervliet (1787–1844) was an aristocrat who became a successful local politician. Nearly two centuries later the two of them feature in the family trees of many of Belgium's surviving aristocracy.

== Reading list ==
- F. VAN DYCKE, Recueil héraldique de familles nobles et patriciennes de la ville et du franconat de Bruges, Bruges, 1851
- J. J. GAILLIARD, Bruges et le Franc, Tome 4, Bruges, 1860, blz. 123-134
- Robert COPPIETERS 'T WALLANT, Notices généalogiques et historiques sur quelques familles brugeoises, Bruges, 1942.
- Emmanuel COPPIETERS & Charles VAN RENYNGHE DE VOXVRIE, Histoire professionnelle et sociale de la famille Coppieters, Volume II, Tablettes des Flandres, Recueil 8, Bruges, 1968.
- Yvan VANDEN BERGHE, Jacobijnen en Tradfitionalisten, Bruxelles, 1972.
- Aquilin JANSSENS DE BISTHOVEN, Akwarellen van August de Peellaert, 1793–1876, Bruges, 1975.
- Jean TULARD, Napoléon et la noblesse d'empire, Taillandier, Paris, 1979.
- Luc DUERLOO & Paul JANSSENS, Armorial de la noblesse belge, Brussel, 1992.
- Oscar COOMANS DE BRACHÈNE, État présent de la noblesse belge, Annuaire 1996, Bruxelles, 1996.
- Andries VAN DEN ABEELE, De Noblesse d'empire in West-Vlaanderen, in: Biekorf, 2002, blz. 309-332.
- Jaak A. RAU & Joseph CORNELISSIS, Anselme de Peellaert (1764–1817) en het domein 't Foreyst in Sint-Andries, in: Brugs Ommeland, 2005, blz. 195-211.
- Jaak A. RAU, Het geboortehguis van Anselme de Peellaert, in: Brugs Ommeland, 2006, blz. 76-79.
- Jaak A. RAU & Joseph CORNELISSIS, Het graf van Anselme de Peellaert, in: Brugs Ommeland, 2006, blz. 238-240.
- Pierre BRANDA, Napoléon et ses hommes, Paris, Fayard, 2011.
