= List of most populous municipalities in Belgium =

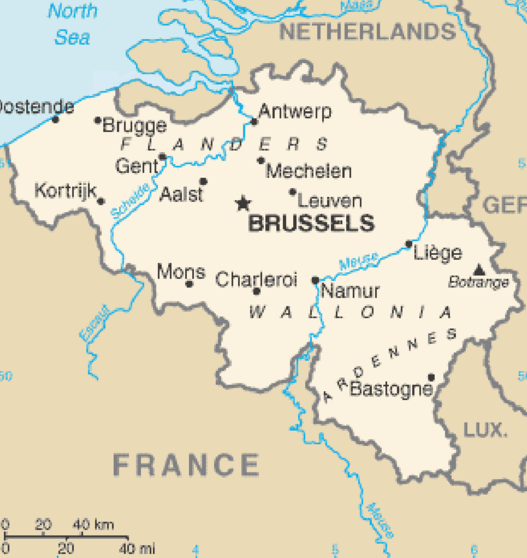
Map of Belgium

This is a list of most populous municipalities in Belgium. Out of the 565 Belgian municipalities (as of 1 January 2025) the list contains all those with a population over 30,000.

Belgium is divided into municipalities, however a municipality may or may not have an additional royally-decreed city status. For example, Brussels is a federal region of 19 municipalities, the City of Brussels being only one of them.

== List ==
Municipalities marked with * or ** have recently (* in 2019 and ** in 2025) been the subject of a merger of two or three former municipalities, population figures for years prior to these mergers take into account the population of all the municipalities involved.

#	Municipality	Population					Province	Region
#	Municipality	1990	2000	2010	2020	2026	Province	Region
1.	Antwerp**	479,974	456,898	493,630	540,196	565,615	Antwerp	Flanders
2.	Ghent	230,543	224,180	243,366	263,927	274,042	East Flanders	Flanders
3.	Charleroi	206,779	200,827	202,598	202,746	206,900	Hainaut	Wallonia
4.	Brussels	136,706	133,859	157,673	185,103	198,674	—	Brussels-Capital Region
5.	Liège	196,825	185,639	192,504	197,217	198,102	Liège	Wallonia
6.	Anderlecht	89,231	87,812	104,647	120,887	129,600	—	Brussels-Capital Region
7.	Schaerbeek	104,768	105,692	121,232	132,799	129,278	—	Brussels-Capital Region
8.	Bruges	117,460	116,246	116,741	118,656	120,458	West Flanders	Flanders
9.	Namur	103,466	105,419	108,950	111,432	115,457	Namur	Wallonia
10.	Leuven	85,193	88,014	95,463	102,275	105,357	Flemish Brabant	Flanders
11.	Molenbeek-Saint-Jean	68,904	71,219	88,181	97,979	98,411	—	Brussels-Capital Region
12.	Mons	91,867	90,935	91,759	95,887	97,745	Hainaut	Wallonia
13.	Aalst	76,245	76,313	80,043	87,332	93,094	East Flanders	Flanders
14.	Hasselt**	73,828	76,068	81,385	87,151	90,914	Limburg	Flanders
15.	Mechelen	75,622	75,438	80,940	86,921	90,355	Antwerp	Flanders
16.	Ixelles	73,128	73,174	80,183	87,632	89,162	—	Brussels-Capital Region
17.	Beveren-Kruibeke-Zwijndrecht**	-	77,334	80,692	85,047	88,344	East Flanders	Flanders
18.	Uccle	75,402	74,221	77,589	83,980	87,548	—	Brussels-Capital Region
19.	Sint-Niklaas	67,979	68,290	71,806	78,531	83,400	East Flanders	Flanders
20.	La Louvière	76,138	76,568	78,071	81,138	81,751	Hainaut	Wallonia
21.	Kortrijk	76,081	74,790	74,911	77,109	81,523	West Flanders	Flanders
22.	Ostend	68,527	67,279	69,064	71,647	73,000	West Flanders	Flanders
23.	Tournai	67,767	67,379	69,043	69,083	69,066	Hainaut	Wallonia
24.	Genk	61,343	62,842	64,757	66,447	68,101	Limburg	Flanders
25.	Roeselare	52,512	54,199	57,432	63,478	67,697	West Flanders	Flanders
26.	Seraing	60,952	60,557	62,698	64,192	64,764	Liège	Wallonia
27.	Woluwe-Saint-Lambert	48,141	46,528	50,749	57,712	60,979	—	Brussels-Capital Region
28.	Mouscron	53,545	52,492	54,651	58,767	60,410	Hainaut	Wallonia
29.	Forest	47,178	45,555	50,258	56,581	58,904	—	Brussels-Capital Region
30.	Verviers	53,657	53,148	55,253	55,290	56,182	Liège	Wallonia
31.	Jette	38,769	39,749	46,818	52,728	54,330	—	Brussels-Capital Region
32.	Lokeren**	40,424	42,211	45,186	48,614	50,897	East Flanders	Flanders
33.	Etterbeek	39,641	39,404	44,352	48,473	49,638	—	Brussels-Capital Region
34.	Beringen	36,289	39,261	42,758	46,598	49,034	Limburg	Flanders
35.	Saint-Gilles	43,579	42,458	46,981	49,678	48,967	—	Brussels-Capital Region
36.	Turnhout	37,669	38,596	40,763	45,280	48,490	Antwerp	Flanders
37.	Vilvoorde	32,942	34,982	39,628	45,495	48,413	Flemish Brabant	Flanders
38.	Dendermonde	42,470	43,137	44,095	45,870	47,828	East Flanders	Flanders
39.	Deinze*	36,242	38,552	41,083	43,580	46,380	East Flanders	Flanders
40.	Evere	29,685	31,348	35,803	42,656	45,984	—	Brussels-Capital Region
41.	Dilbeek	36,647	37,722	39,998	43,423	45,111	Flemish Brabant	Flanders
42.	Heist-op-den-Berg	35,238	37,233	39,866	42,950	44,991	Antwerp	Flanders
43.	Tongeren-Borgloon**	39,539	39,839	40,372	42,152	44,239	Limburg	Flanders
44.	Bilzen-Hoeselt**	35,652	38,468	40,398	42,207	43,228	Limburg	Flanders
45.	Halle	32,574	33,655	36,000	40,182	43,131	Flemish Brabant	Flanders
46.	Geel	32,367	33,677	36,990	40,709	42,650	Antwerp	Flanders
47.	Woluwe-Saint-Pierre	38,396	37,922	39,077	42,119	42,566	—	Brussels-Capital Region
48.	Sint-Truiden	37,027	37,147	39,309	40,672	41,987	Limburg	Flanders
49.	Herstal	36,356	36,292	38,219	40,190	40,909	Liège	Wallonia
50.	Ninove	33,318	34,559	36,675	39,251	40,879	East Flanders	Flanders
51.	Braine-l'Alleud	31,989	35,259	38,303	40,170	40,815	Walloon Brabant	Wallonia
53.	Waregem	34,555	35,839	36,306	38,350	40,737	West Flanders	Flanders
52.	Maasmechelen	33,833	35,430	36,937	38,933	40,653	Limburg	Flanders
54.	Grimbergen	31,944	32,930	35,169	37,972	40,491	Flemish Brabant	Flanders
55.	Mol	30,270	31,683	34,114	37,022	38,793	Antwerp	Flanders
56.	Lier	30,918	32,191	33,930	36,646	38,747	Antwerp	Flanders
57.	Brasschaat	34,540	37,138	36,949	38,223	38,529	Antwerp	Flanders
58.	Merelbeke-Melle**	30,088	32,135	33,891	36,567	37,675	East Flanders	Flanders
59.	Zaventem	25,856	26,901	30,446	34,782	37,518	Flemish Brabant	Flanders
60.	Evergem	29,407	31,155	33,112	35,628	37,371	East Flanders	Flanders
61.	Sint-Pieters-Leeuw	28,697	30,013	31,572	34,621	37,055	Flemish Brabant	Flanders
62.	Tienen	31,669	31,479	32,552	35,293	36,962	Flemish Brabant	Flanders
63.	Asse	27,047	27,931	30,228	33,505	36,018	Flemish Brabant	Flanders
64.	Châtelet	36,656	35,452	36,050	35,668	35,975	Hainaut	Wallonia
65.	Wavre	28,126	31,033	32,910	34,748	35,735	Walloon Brabant	Wallonia
66.	Auderghem	29,143	28,804	30,811	34,404	35,659	—	Brussels-Capital Region
67.	Ypres	35,231	35,071	34,962	34,995	35,629	West Flanders	Flanders
69.	Lommel	27,427	30,433	32,917	34,245	35,451	Limburg	Flanders
68.	Geraardsbergen	30,219	30,945	32,033	33,649	35,338	East Flanders	Flanders
70.	Heusden-Zolder	28,589	30,105	31,526	33,892	35,032	Limburg	Flanders
71.	Schoten	31,037	32,733	33,342	34,316	34,849	Antwerp	Flanders
72.	Pelt*	25,439	27,911	30,502	33,076	34,698	Limburg	Flanders
73.	Menen	32,726	32,028	32,530	33,540	34,640	West Flanders	Flanders
74.	Binche	32,828	32,190	32,749	33,448	33,841	Hainaut	Wallonia
75.	Oudenaarde	27,055	27,788	29,702	31,612	33,105	East Flanders	Flanders
76.	Knokke-Heist	31,541	33,148	33,825	33,089	32,163	West Flanders	Flanders
77.	Wevelgem	30,462	31,374	30,975	31,579	32,089	West Flanders	Flanders
78.	Tielt**	30,051	30,263	30,706	31,436	31,973	West Flanders	Flanders
79.	Aarschot	26,179	27,495	28,405	30,183	31,948	Flemish Brabant	Flanders
80.	Ottignies-Louvain-la-Neuve	22,194	27,380	30,721	31,316	31,823	Walloon Brabant	Wallonia
81.	Temse	23,844	25,533	28,147	30,196	31,814	East Flanders	Flanders
82.	Courcelles	29,336	29,706	30,218	31,179	31,673	Hainaut	Wallonia
83.	Arlon	23,325	24,791	27,763	30,081	31,440	Luxembourg	Wallonia
84.	Lochristi**	24,107	25,716	28,454	30,419	30,982	East Flanders	Flanders
85.	Houthalen-Helchteren	27,062	29,215	30,126	30,550	30,879	Limburg	Flanders
86.	Tessenderlo-Ham**	22,992	25,145	27,920	29,704	30,827	Limburg	Flanders
87.	Brecht	20,172	25,091	27,597	29,454	30,755	Antwerp	Flanders
88.	Harelbeke	25,733	26,320	26,577	29,502	30,605	West Flanders	Flanders
89.	Waterloo	27,424	28,986	29,598	30,376	30,386	Walloon Brabant	Wallonia
90.	Ath	23,849	25,430	28,026	29,494	30,235	Hainaut	Wallonia

== Gallery ==
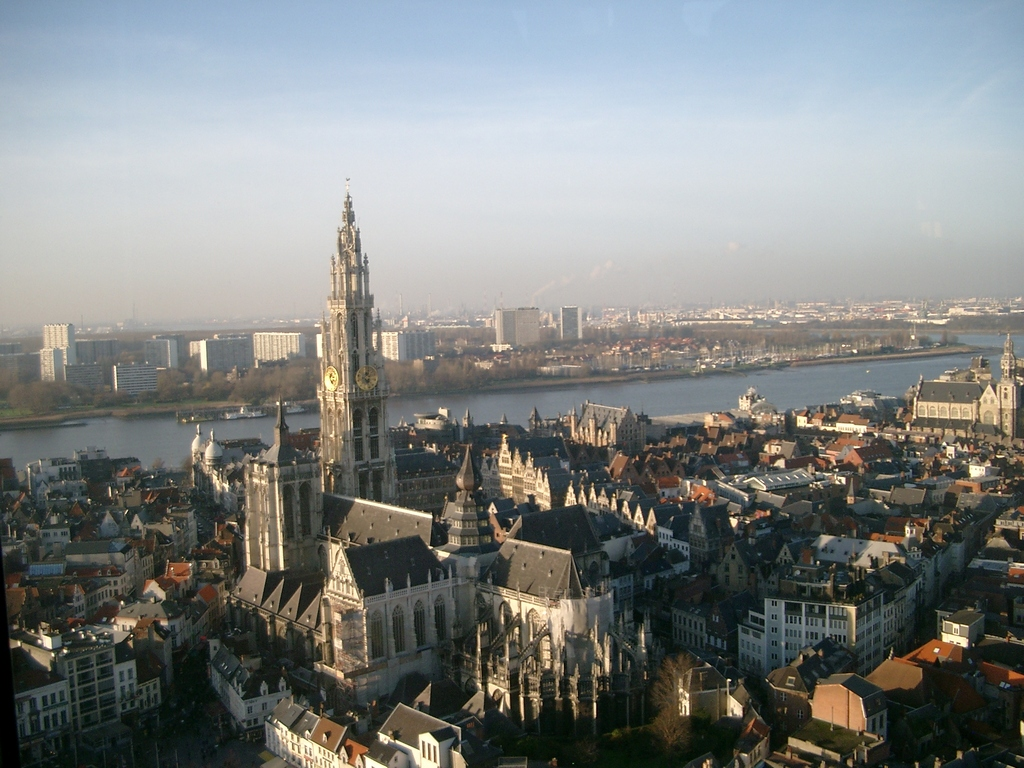
Antwerp

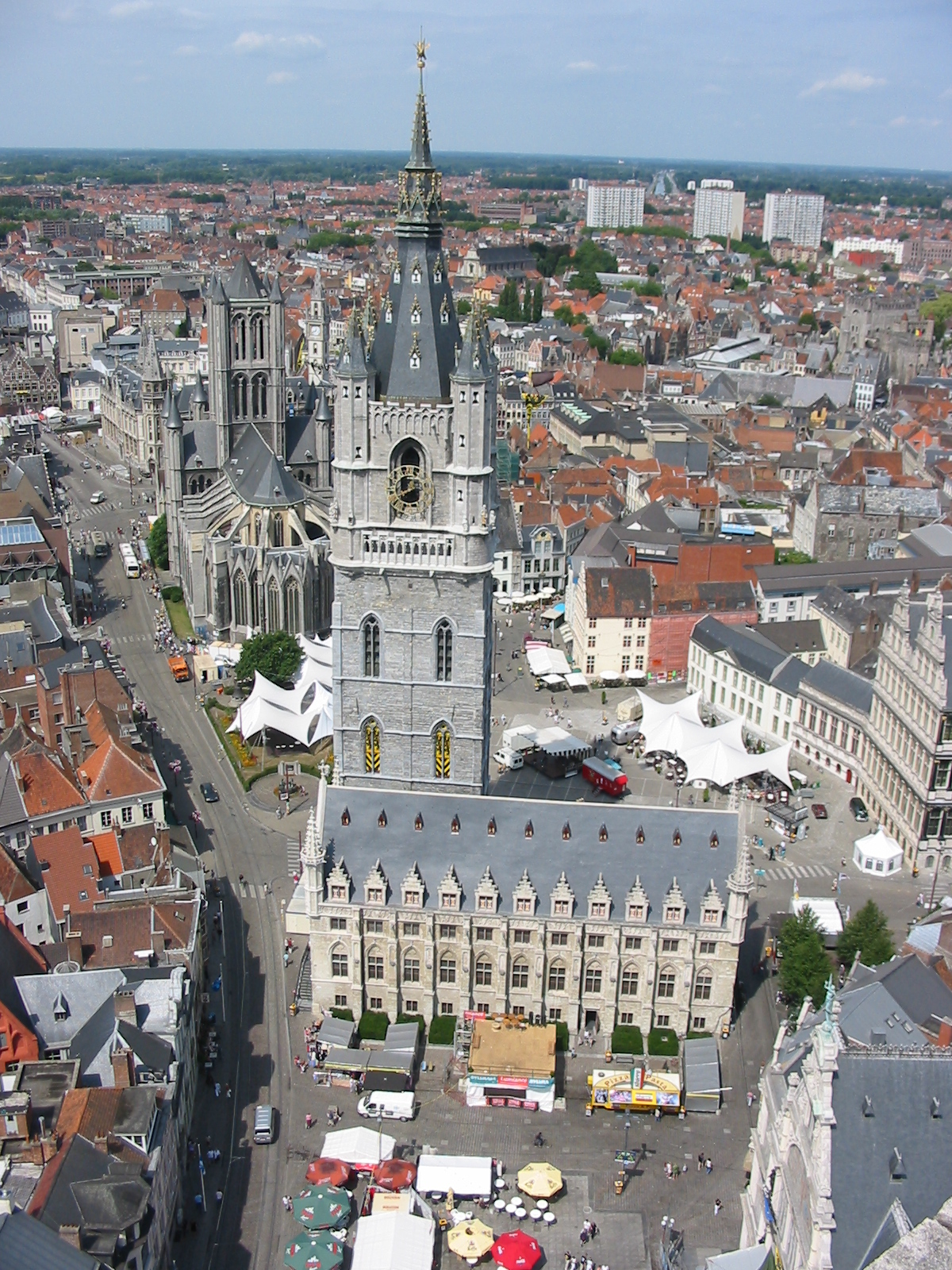
Ghent

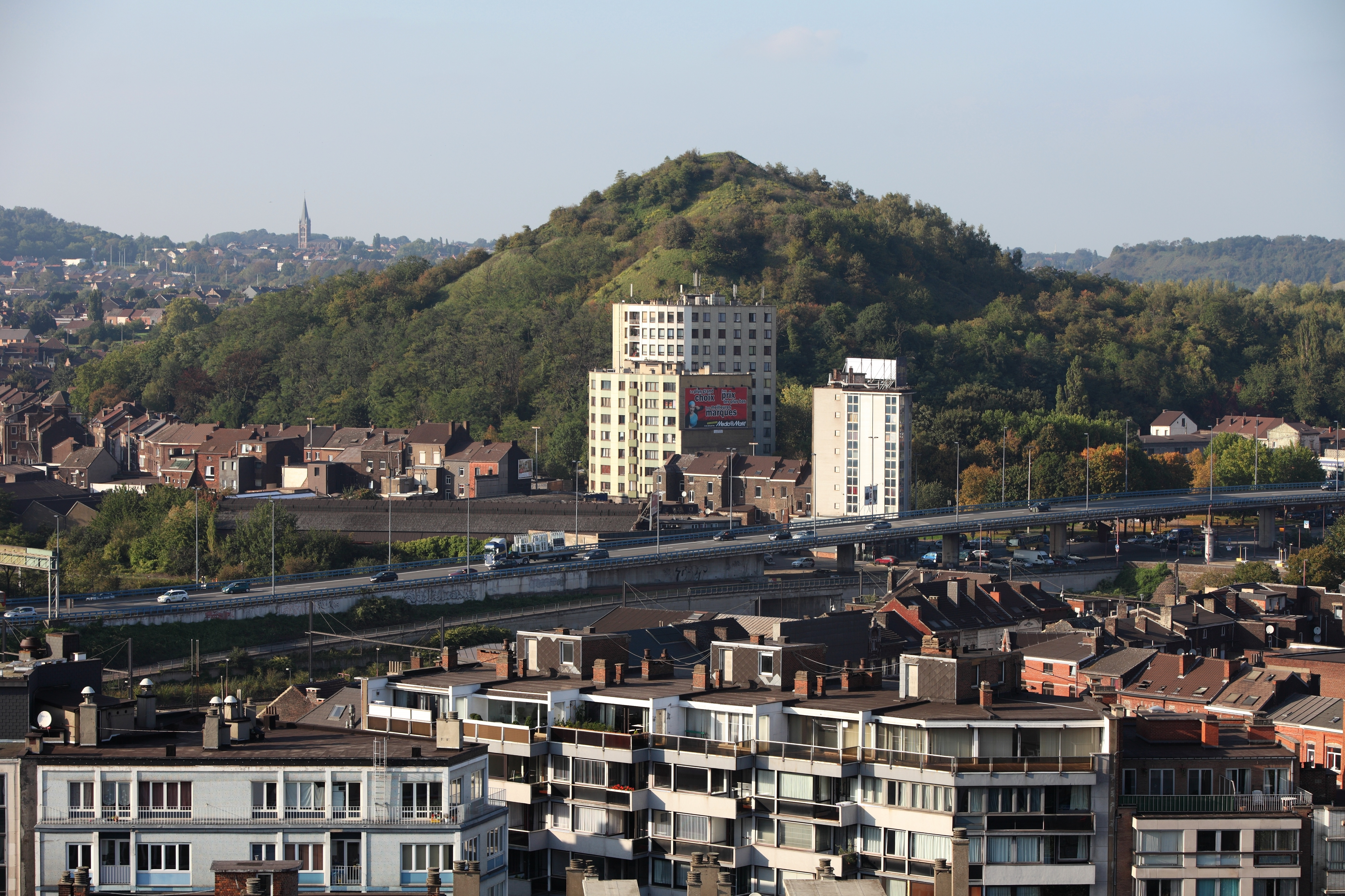
Charleroi

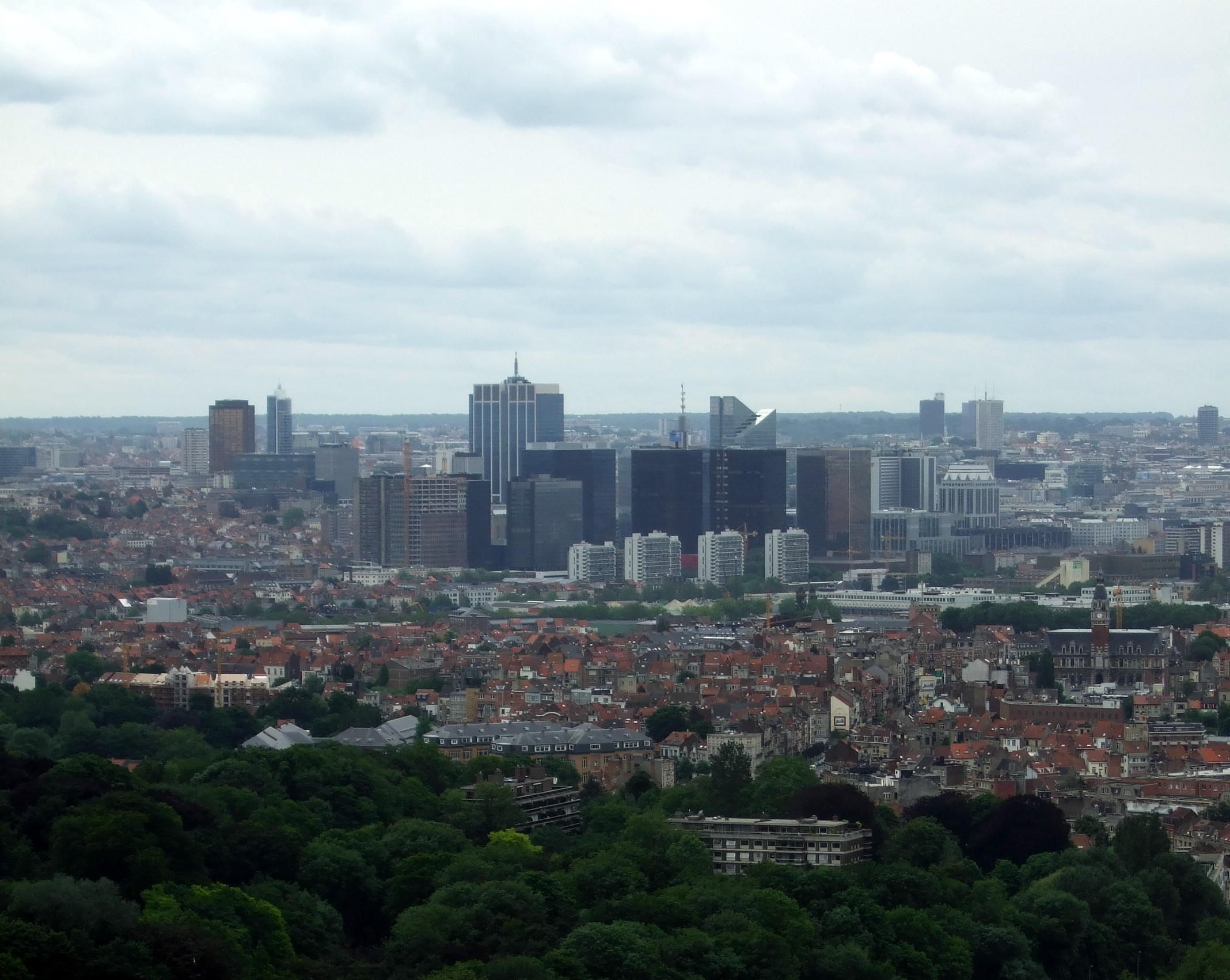
Brussels

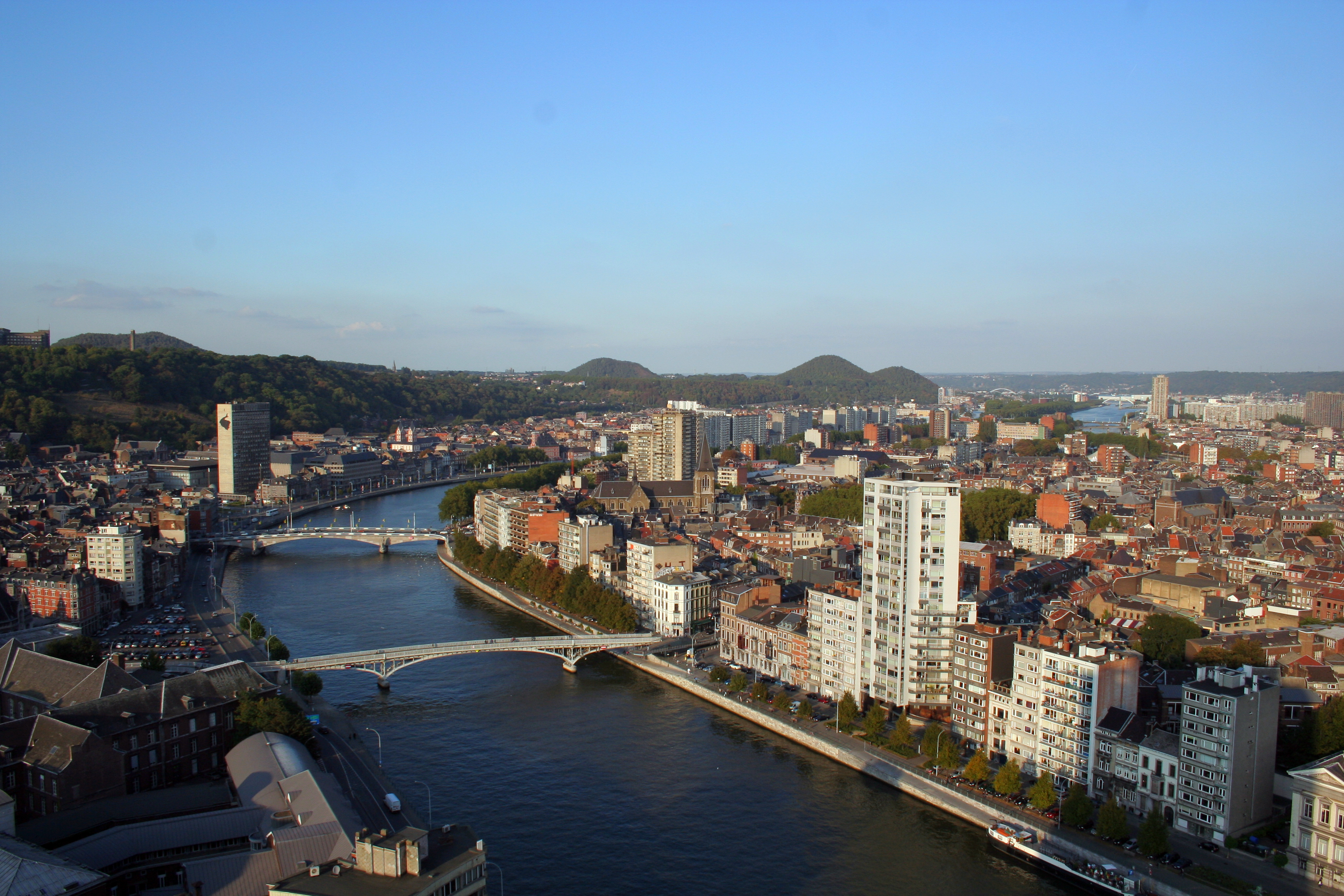
Liège

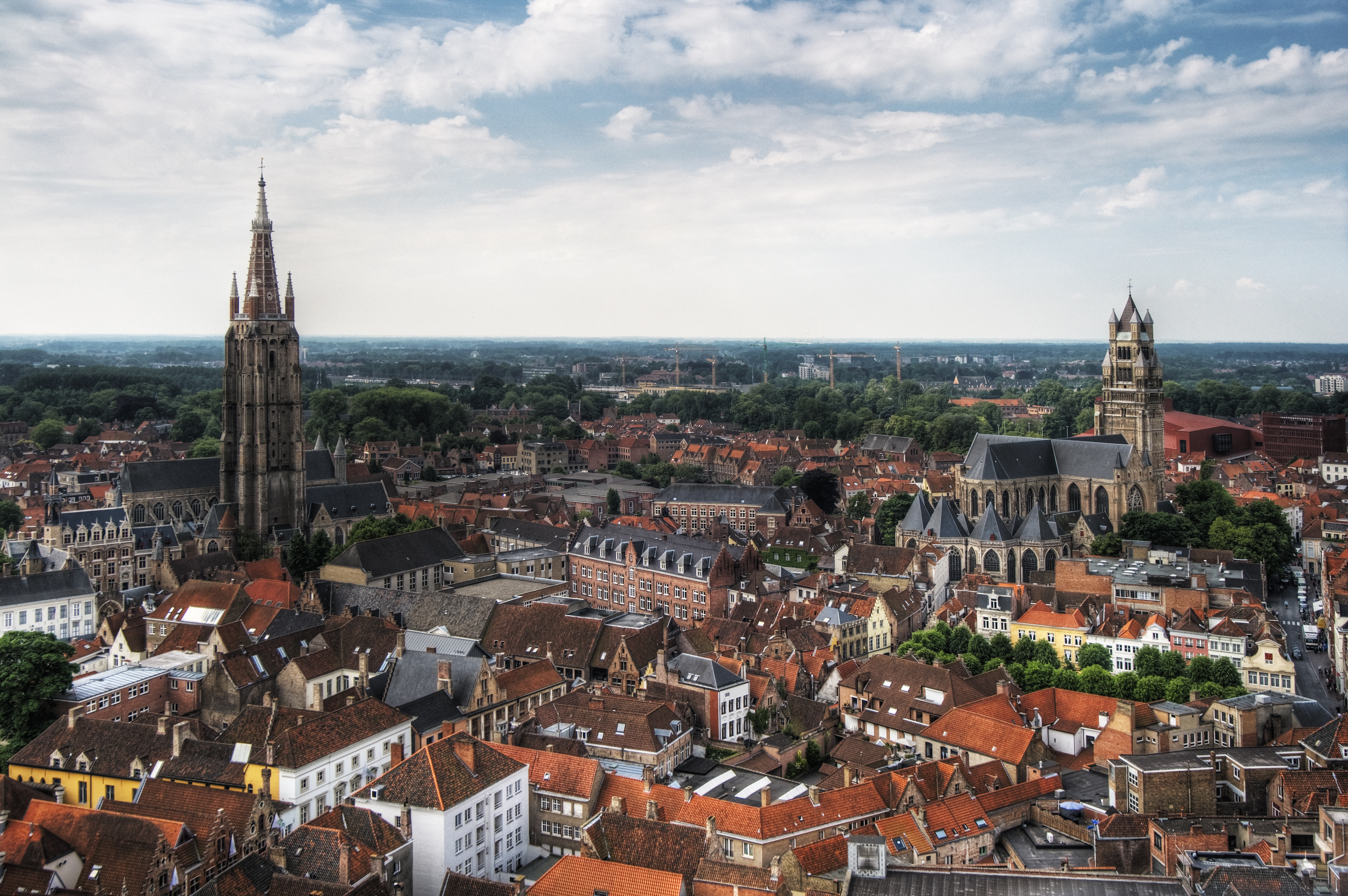
Bruges

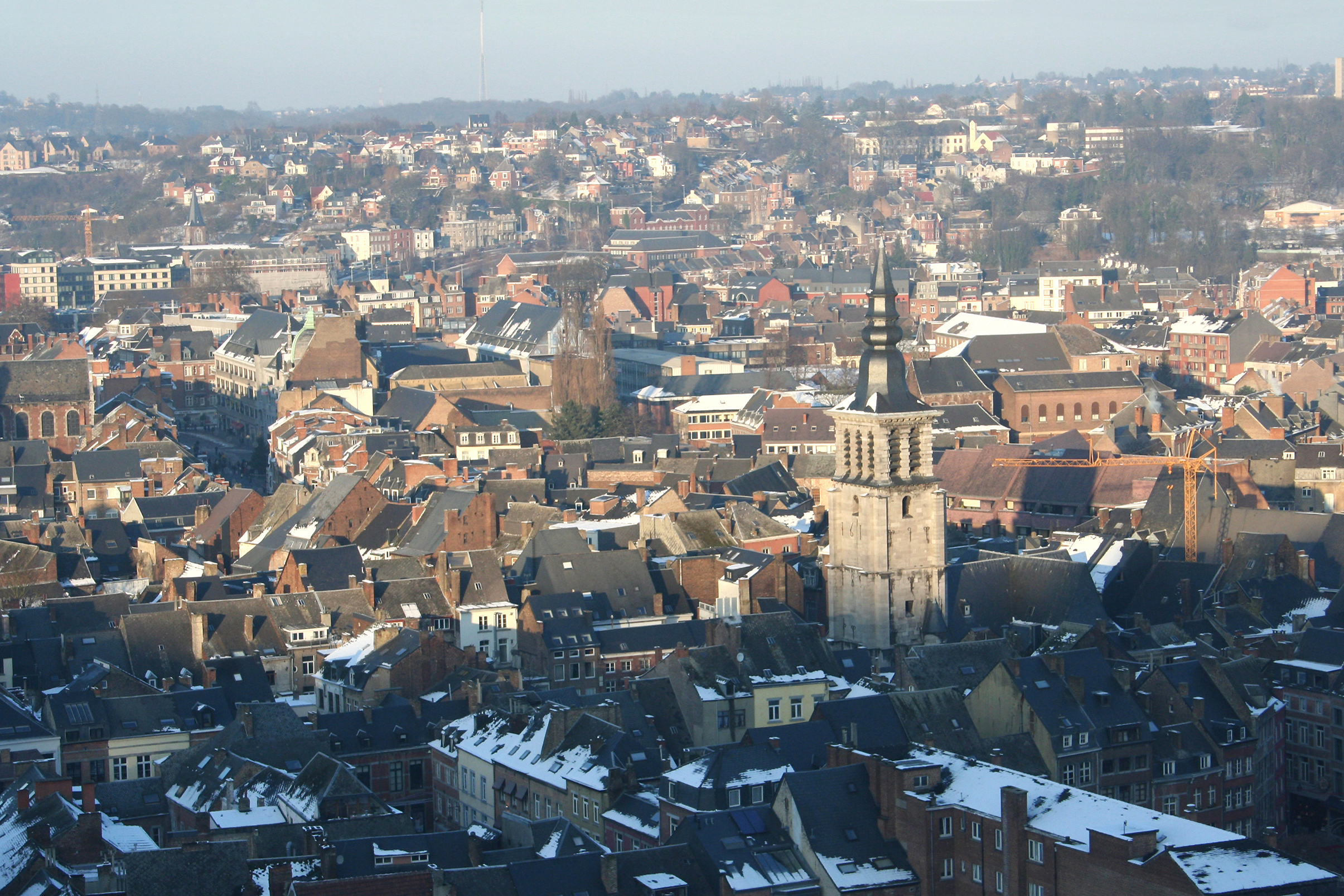
Namur

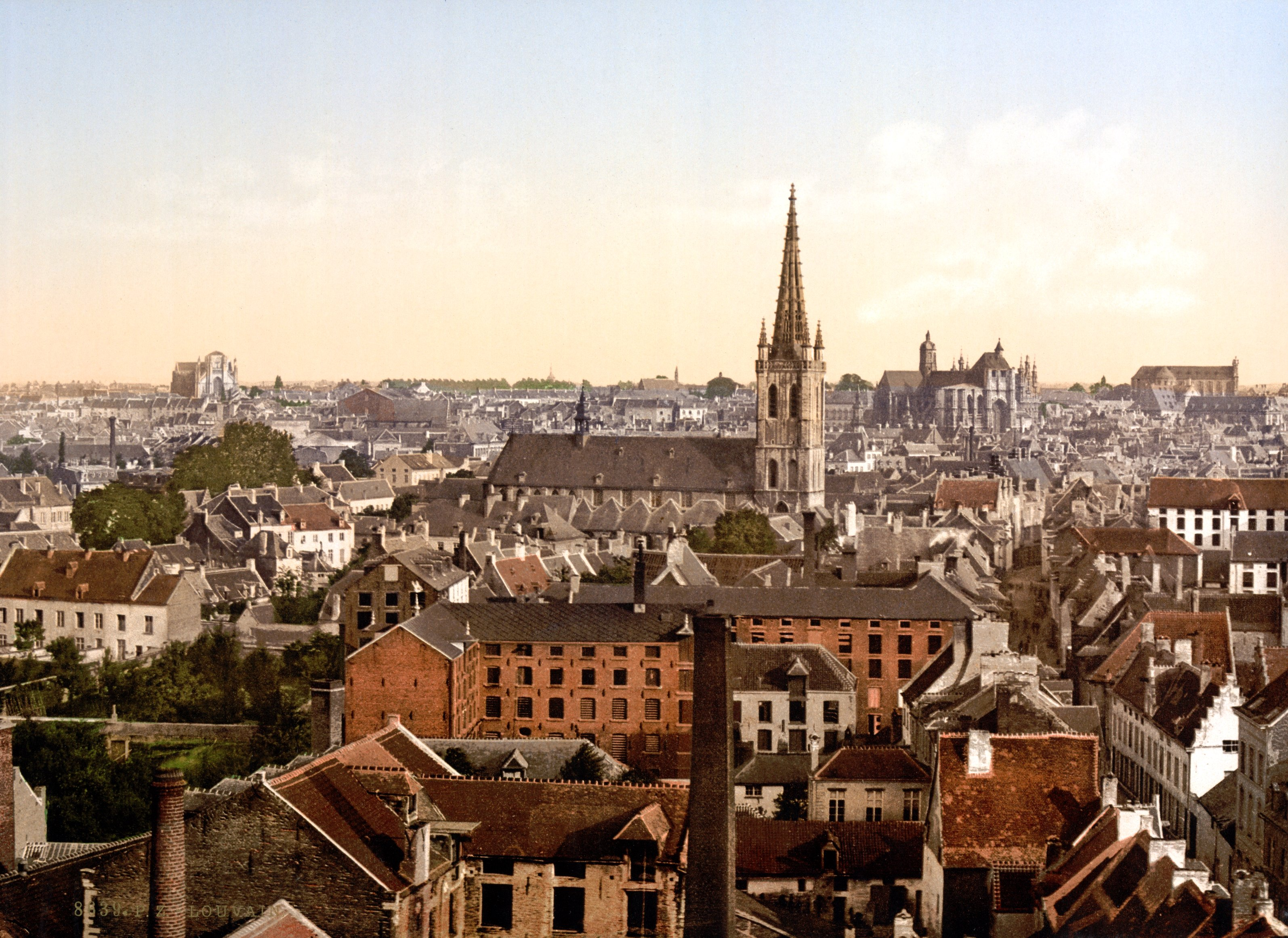
Leuven

== See also ==
- City status in Belgium
- Metropolitan areas in Belgium
- Municipalities of Belgium
- List of cities in Flanders
- List of cities in Wallonia
- List of cities in Europe
- Lists of cities
