= De Karmeliet =

Coordinates: 51°12′35″N 3°13′59″E

Restaurant information
- Established: 1983
- Closed: 2016
- Head chef: Geert Vanhecke
- Rating: Closed
- Location: Bruges, Belgium
- Website: dekarmeliet.be

De Karmeliet is a restaurant in Bruges, Belgium. The leading chef is Geert Vanhecke.

It is rated with 3 stars by the Michelin Red Guide, one of three restaurants in the country of Belgium to receive such an honour as of 2016, the year it was announced it would be closed. It is now closed.

De Karmeliet appeared on the Restaurant magazine Top 50 Restaurants in the World list in 2003, 2004, 2006 and 2010.

== See also ==
- List of Michelin three starred restaurants
