= Dirk De fauw =

Belgian politician

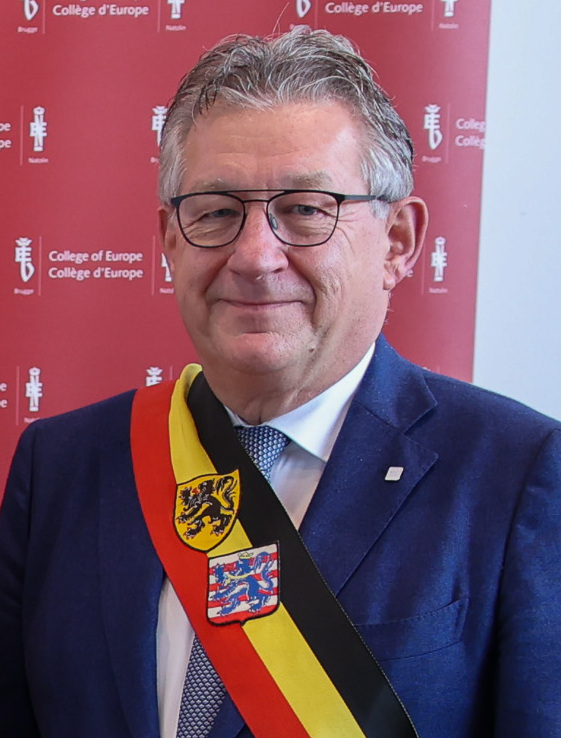
- Dirk De fauw in 2024

Mayor of Bruges
- Incumbent
- Assumed office 1 January 2019
- Preceded by: Renaat Landuyt

Personal details
- Born: 7 December 1957 (age 68) Varsenare, Belgium
- Party: CD&V
- Occupation: Lawyer

Dirk De fauw (Dutch pronunciation: [ˈdɪr(ə)ɡ də ˈfʌu]; born 7 December 1957) is a Belgian politician of the CD&V party. He is the son of Hilaire De fauw, a politician of the CVP who was municipal councilor of Sint-Andries, provincial councilor in West Flanders and deputy of the same province. Dirk De fauw studied law and is a lawyer.

He is the current mayor of Bruges.

== Career ==
He is a Municipal councilor of Bruges since 1983, and a Provincial councilor of West Flanders since 1986. In 1991, he became party leader for the CD&V in the West Flemish provincial council. After the provincial elections of 21 October 1994, he was appointed vice-chairman of the provincial council. He has been an Alderman of Public Works in the city of Bruges from 1995 to 2000. From 2001 to 2012, he was member of the permanent deputation of the province of West Flanders. In 2013, he became an alderman for welfare, diversity and policy of the north–south, and was also chairman of the OCMW in Bruges, until the end of 2018.

In early 2011, he was appointed CD&V party leader for the October 2012, municipal elections. This made him a candidate successor to the then mayor and fellow party member Patrick Moenaert. However, the SP.A party received slightly more votes than CD&V in the elections, and De fauw, according to the agreement made, did not become mayor. Under Landuyt he was alderman and OCMW chairman; he did not continue his mandate as deputy because of the incompatibility of the offices.

In the municipal elections of 14 October 2018, the CD&V emerged as the main party. De fauw reached a coalition agreement with the lists of the SP.A and Open Vld, resulting in a majority that nominated him as future mayor. He has been mayor of the city of Bruges since 1 January 2019.

De fauw was stabbed on the morning of 20 June 2020, being cut in the neck. The suspected perpetrator was immediately arrested and the public prosecutor of Bruges started an investigation for attempted murder. The perpetrator was put in a psychiatric institution as insane.

Political offices
Preceded by Renaat Landuyt	Mayor of Bruges; 2019–today	Succeeded by Incumbent
