= List of mayors of Bruges =

This is a list of mayors of Bruges.

Name	Date of birth	Date of death	Office entered	Office left	Party
Jean-Baptiste Coppieters 't Wallant	8 December 1770	8 July 1840	1830	1841	
Jean-Marie de Pelichy van Huerne	12 May 1774	18 November 1859	1841	1855	Catholic Party
Jules Boyaval	7 February 1814	13 September 1879	1855	1876	Liberal Party
Amedée Visart de Bocarmé	4 November 1835	29 May 1924	1876	1924	Catholic Party
Victor Van Hoestenberghe	10 December 1868	12 July 1960	1924	1956	Christian People's Party
Pierre Vandamme	10 July 1885	18 March 1983	1956	1971	Christian People's Party
Michel Van Maele	2 October 1921	26 February 2003	1972	1977	Christian People's Party
Frank Van Acker	10 January 1929	22 April 1992	1977	1992	Socialist Party
Fernand Bourdon	1 October 1933	3 August 2021	1992	1994	Socialist Party
Patrick Moenaert	27 March 1949	15 May 2024	1995	2012	Christian People's Party
Renaat Landuyt	28 January 1959		2013	2019	Socialist Party–Differently
Dirk De fauw	7 December 1957		2019	Incumbent	CD&V

== See also ==
- Timeline of Bruges
