= Metropolitan areas in Belgium =

National statistics differ between five Metropolitan areas in Belgium. These five metropolitan areas (Dutch: Agglomeratie, French: Agglomération) are also covered by Eurostat statistics as separate Larger Urban Zones (LUZ).

== Metropolitan areas ==
Rank	metropolitan area	region	core city population	metro population	LUZ population	LUZ area	LUZ pop. density
1	Brussels-Capital Region	Brussels	194,291 (2019)	1,789,447 (2006)	1,800,663 (2004)	1,614 km^{2}	1116 inhabitants/km^{2}
2	Antwerp metropolitan area	Flemish Region	525,935 (2019)	1,200,000 (2006)	1,200,000 (2004)	941 km^{2}	972 inhabitants/km^{2}
3	Liège metropolitan area	Wallonia	197,327 (2019)	633,934 (2006)	626,357 (2004)	1,055 km^{2}	594 inhabitants/km^{2}
4	Ghent metropolitan area	Flemish Region	262,219 (2019)	416,493 (2006)	399,741 (2004)	537 km^{2}	744 inhabitants/km^{2}
5	Charleroi metropolitan area	Wallonia	202,267 (2019)	403,868 (2006)	386,060 (2004)	615 km^{2}	628 inhabitants/km^{2}

== See also ==
- List of cities and towns in Belgium
- List of metropolitan areas in European Union
