= List of mayors of Ghent =

This is a list of mayors of Ghent, Belgium:

== 1800s ==
| Name | Date of birth | Date of death | Office Entered | Office Left | Party |
|---|---|---|---|---|---|
| Joseph Van Crombrugghe | 22 September 1770 | 10 March 1842 | 1825 | 1836 | Liberal |
| Jean-Baptiste Minne-Barth | 2 September 1796 | 17 February 1851 | 1837 | 1840 | Liberal |
| Joseph Van Crombrugghe (2) | 22 September 1770 | 10 March 1842 | 1840 | 1842 | Liberal |
| Constant de Kerchove de Denterghem | 31 December 1790 | 12 July 1865 | 1842 | 1854 | Liberal |
| Josse Joseph de Lehaye | 28 May 1800 | 22 September 1888 | 1854 | 1857 | Liberal |
| Joseph Sébastien della Faille d'Assenede | 1756 | 1830 | 1804 | 1808 | |
| Philippe Louis Vilain XIIII | 1778 | 1856 | 1808 | 1808 | |
| Pierre Joseph Pycke de Ten Aerde | 1771 | 1820 | 1808 | 1811 | |
| Josse vander Haeghen | | | 1811 | | |
| Charles de Kerchove de Denterghem | 1819 | 1882 | 1857 | 1882 | Liberal |
| Hippolyte Lippens | 16 October 1847 | 31 December 1906 | 1882 | 1895 | Liberal |
| Emile Braun | 2 December 1849 | 30 August 1927 | 1895 | 1921 | Liberal |

== 1900s ==
| Name | Date of birth | Date of death | Office Entered | Office Left | Party |
|---|---|---|---|---|---|
| Edward Anseele sr acting mayor | 26 July 1856 | 18 February 1938 | 1918 | 1918 | Belgian Labour Party |
| Alfred Vanderstegen | 26 January 1869 | 7 January 1959 | 1921 | 1946 | Liberal |
| Hendrik Elias effective mayor (Not mentioned on official list.) | 12 June 1902 | 2 February 1973 | 1941 | 1944 | VNV |
| Edward Anseele, Jr. acting mayor | 21 March 1902 | 28 June 1981 | 1944 | 1946 | PSB-BSP |
| Emile Claeys | 12 April 1894 | 24 February 1984 | 1946 | 1952 | PSC-CVP |
| Laurent Merchiers | 9 June 1904 | 5 February 1986 | 1952 | 1958 | Liberal |
| Emile Claeys (2) | 12 April 1894 | 24 February 1984 | 1959 | 1970 | CVP |
| Geeraard Van den Daele | 21 July 1908 | 1 October 1984 | 1971 | 1976 | CVP |
| Neile van Davise | 3 August 1919 | | 1976 | 1976 | CVP |
| Placide De Paepe | 2 November 1913 | 12 January 1989 | 1976 | 1982 | CVP |
| Jacques Monsaert | 9 September 1934 | 28 July 2002 | 1983 | 1988 | CVP |
| Gilbert Temmerman | 25 February 1928 | 19 January 2012 | 1989 | 1994 | SP |
| Frank Beke | 5 August 1946 | | 1995 | 2006 | SP |

== 2000s ==
| Name | Date of birth | Date of death | Office Entered | Office Left | Party |
|---|---|---|---|---|---|
| Daniël Termont | 19 May 1953 | | 2007 | 2018 | SP.A |
| Mathias De Clercq | 26 December 1981 | | 2018 | | Open VLD |

== See also ==
- Timeline of Ghent
