= Ghent-Eeklo (Chamber of Representatives constituency) =

Belgian political subdivision

Ghent-Eeklo was a constituency used to elect members of the Belgian Chamber of Representatives between 1900 and 2003.

== Representatives ==
Name	Party	From	To
Achille Heyndrickx	CVP	1946	1949
Adhémar d'Alcantara	CVP	1958	1961
Adhémar d'Alcantara	CVP	1965	1985
Adhémar Deneir	CVP	1971	1985
Adolf Dhavé	Catholic	1929	1946
Aimé Foncke	CVP	1963	1965
Albert Kluyskens	Catholic	1936	1946
Albert Mariën	Liberal	1932	1946
Albert Mechelynck	Liberal	1904	1924
Alfons Coppieters	CVP	1977	1985
Alfons Siffer	Catholic	1912	1932
Amédée De Keuleneir	BSP	1946	1971
André Denys	PVV	1981	1995
Anne Van Haesendonck	CVP	1997	1999
Arthur Buysse	Liberal	1909	1921
Arthur Buysse	Liberal	1924	1926
Arthur De Sweemer	BSP	1946	1965
Arthur Verhaegen	Catholic	1900	1917
August Balthazar	PS	1929	1944
August De Schryver	Catholic	1928	1965
Auguste Huyshauwer	Catholic	1908	1926
Bart Vandendriessche	CVP	1991	1995
Boudewijn Maes	Frontpartij	1919	1921
Camiel Struyvelt	Catholic	1939	1958
Carlos Lisabeth	PS	1989	1995
Daan Schalck	PS	1999	2003
Dany Vandenbossche	PS	1995	1999
Désiré Cnudde	PS	1919	1939
Edward Anseele	PS	1900	1936
Edward Anseele jr.	PS	1936	1974
Emile Braun	Liberal	1900	1925
Emile Flamant	PVV	1971	1994
Félix Cambier	PS	1900	1909
Fernand van Ackere	Catholic	1921	1936
Francis Van den Eynde	VB	1991	1995
Frans Baert	VU	1971	1987
Frédéric Vergauwen	Catholic	1914	1919
Geeraard Van den Daele	CVP	1946	1965
Geert Versnick	PVV	1994	2010
Gérard Cooreman	Catholic	1898	1914
Gilbert Temmerman	BSP	1971	1989
Gustaaf Gevaert	PS	1921	1929
Guy Schrans	PVV	1977	1978
Guy Verhofstadt	PVV	1985	1995
Hector Cuelenaere	Catholic	1921	1928
Hendrik Elias	Frontpartij	1932	1946
Henri Liebaert	Liberal	1939	1958
Ignace Van Belle	PVV	1978	1985
Ignace Van Belle	PVV	1995	1999
Jean Kickx	PVV	1974	1977
Jean Pede	PVV	1965	1971
Jean-Baptiste Lampens	PS	1908	1922
Jef Tavernier	Agalev	1995	2002
Jo Van Overberghe	CVP	1998	1999
Johan De Roo	CVP	1985	1991
Johan Van Hecke	CVP	1985	1997
Johannes Wannyn	VU	1965	1977
Joke Schauvliege	CVP	1999	2003
Jozef Chalmet	PS	1925	1962
Jozef De Lille	Frontpartij	1932	1946
Jules Devigne	Liberal	1900	1908
Jules Maenhaut van Lemberge	Catholic	1900	1940
Justin Van Cleemputte	Catholic	1900	1919
Karel Van Hoorebeke	VU	1995	2003
Laurent Merchiers	Liberal	1955	1958
Leo Wouters	VU	1961	1971
Leopold Niemegeers	PVV	1968	1977
Liliane De Cock	Agalev	2002	2003
Lionel Pussemier	Catholic	1918	1936
Livien Danschutter	BSP	1962	1981
Louis Duysburgh	REX	1936	1939
Luc Van den Bossche	PS	1981	1995
Maurice Dewulf	CVP	1954	1974
Maurice Van Herreweghe	CVP	1964	1977
Monique De Weweire	CVP	1977	1981
Norbert Van Doorne	Liberal	1928	1932
Norbert Van Doorne	Liberal	1949	1955
Paul de Smet de Naeyer	Catholic	1900	1925
Paul Eeckman	CVP	1946	1965
Paul Supré	Catholic	1991	1995
Paul Van Grembergen	VU	1946	1971
Pierre De Weirdt	PS	1936	1939
Pieter De Crem	CVP	1991	2003
Placide De Paepe	CVP	1946	1974
Rodolphe Desaegher	Liberal	1985	1995
Roland Deswaene	PVV	1995	1999
Rudolf Vercammen	PS	1981	1995
Théo Lefèvre	CVP	1946	1971
Tony Van Parys	CVP	1985	2003
Vera Dua	Agalev	1991	1995
Victor Begerem	Catholic	1919	1921
Victor Carpentier	Liberal	1965	1974
Wilfried Martens	CVP	1974	1991
Wilfried Van Durme	Agalev	1985	1991
Willy De Clercq	Liberal	1958	1985
