= Kerchove =

Surname list

Kerchove is the surname of the following people

- Charles de Kerchove de Denterghem (1819-1882), Belgian engineer and politician
- Constant de Kerchove de Denterghem (1790-1865), Belgian liberal politician
- Derrick de Kerchove (born in 1944), Canadian writer and professor
- Gilles de Kerchove (born in 1956), Belgian senior European Union official
- Marthe de Kerchove de Denterghem (1877-1956), Belgian feminist
- Oswald de Kerchove de Denterghem (1844-1906), Belgian liberal politician
