= Timeline of Ghent =

The following is a timeline of the history of the municipality of Ghent, Belgium.

== Prior to 19th century ==
- 941 - Origins of the crypt of what became St Bavo's Cathedral.
- 1274/1300 - Origins of the choir of what became St Bavo's Cathedral.
- 1336 - Tapestry-weavers' guild established.
- 1380
  - Belfry of Ghent built.
  - Public clock installed (approximate date).
- 1432 - Artist Van Eyck paints altarpiece for St. John's Church.
- 1448 - "De Fonteine" chamber of rhetoric constituted.
- 1480 - Saint Michael's Church built.
- 1483 - Printing press in operation.
- 1531 - St Bavo's Cathedral built.
- 1559 - Roman Catholic Diocese of Ghent established.
- 1576 - Pacification of Ghent signed - an alliance of the provinces of the Habsburg Netherlands.
- 1584 - Spaniards in power.
- 1667 - The oldest Belgian newspaper, the Gazet van Gent was founded.
- 1714 - Formed part of the Austrian Netherlands.
- 1771 - Royal Academy of Fine Arts (Ghent) active.
- 1794 - Became the capital of the French department of the Scheldt.

== 19th century ==
- 1814 - Treaty of Ghent signed between the US and the UK.
- 1817 - Ghent University established by William I of the Netherlands.
- 1827 - Ghent–Terneuzen Canal built.
- 1833 - Archaeological Museum (Ghent) founded.
- 1835 - Royal Conservatory of Ghent founded.
- 1841 - Bank of Flanders established.
- 1845 - Population: 105,711.
- 1861 - Gent-Dampoort railway station opens.
- 1863 - Statue of Jacob van Artevelde erected in Friday Market Square.
- 1866/1867 - A serious outbreak of cholera.
- 1874 - Horse-drawn tram begins operating.
- 1875 - Station Gent-Oost opens.
- 1879 - De Gentenaar newspaper begins publication.
- 1880
  - Coöperatieve Maatschappij Vooruit (cooperative) founded.
  - Population: 131,431.
- 1881 - Bank of Ghent established.
- 1883 - Royal Sport Nautique de Gand rowing club formed.
- 1891 - Het Volk newspaper begins publication.
- 1895 - Emile Braun becomes mayor.
- 1897 - Cluysen - Ter Donck Regatta begins.
- 1900
  - Ghent system of unemployment benefits introduced.
  - K.A.A. Gent football club formed.

== 20th century ==
- 1902 - Ghent University Botanic Garden established.
- 1904
  - Electric tram begins operating.
  - Population: 162,482.
- 1912 - Gent-Sint-Pieters railway station and Patria Cinema open.
- 1913 - Exposition universelle et internationale (1913) held in city.
- 1914 - Vooruit built.
- 1919 - Population: 165,655.
- 1920 - Jules Ottenstadion (stadium) built.
- 1930 - Population: 170,358.
- 1942 - Ghent University Library Book Tower built.
- 1947 - Emile Claeys becomes mayor.
- 1959 - Ghent University Hospital opens.
- 1965 - Section of Mendonk becomes part of Ghent.
- 1970
  - Studio Skoop (cinema) opens.
  - Population: 148,860.
- 1973 - Gentbrugge railway station built.
- 1975 - Station Gent-Zeehaven opens.
- 1976 - Mariakerke becomes part of Ghent.
- 1977 - Gentbrugge becomes part of city.
- 1980
  - Amsab-Instituut voor Sociale Geschiedenis founded.
  - Population: 241,695.
- 1981 - Decascoop (cinema) built.
- 1987 - Flanders Expo arena built.
- 1995 - Hogeschool Gent (college) established.

== 21st century ==
- 2006 - Project Gent-Sint-Pieters begins.
- 2007 - Daniël Termont becomes mayor.
- 2010 - Ghent City Museum opens.
- 2012 - Arteveldetoren hi-rise built.
- 2013
  - Ghelamco Arena opens.
  - Population: 248,242.
- 2014 - Virginie Lovelinggebouw built.
- 2020 - Ghent University Museum opens.

== See also ==
- Ghent history
- History of Ghent
- List of mayors of Ghent
- Timelines of other municipalities in Belgium: Antwerp, Bruges, Brussels, Leuven, Liège
- History of urban centers in the Low Countries

== Bibliography ==
in English

- Thomas Nugent (1749), "Ghent", The Grand Tour, vol. 1: Netherlands, London: S. Birt, hdl:2027/mdp.39015030762598
- "Ghent". Gazetteer of the Netherlands. London: G.G. and J. Robinson. 1794.
- Abraham Rees (1819), "Ghent, a city of France", The Cyclopaedia, London: Longman, Hurst, Rees, Orme & Brown, hdl:2027/uc2.ark:/13960/t9571pn88
- "Ghent", Handbook for Travellers in Holland and Belgium (20th ed.), London: John Murray, 1881, hdl:2027/hvd.hn2ha2 – via HathiTrust
- The visitors universal handybook and guide to Antwerp, Brussels, Waterloo, Ghent, Bruges, Liège, etc. etc (5th ed.). Antwerp: John De Wit & Joris. 1884.
- W. Pembroke Fetridge (1885), "Ghent", Harper's Hand-Book for Travellers in Europe and the East, New York: Harper & Brothers
- "Ghent". Chambers's Encyclopaedia. Vol. 5. London. 1901. hdl:2027/uc2.ark:/13960/t1fj2r624.
- "Ghent", Belgium and Holland (15th ed.), Leipzig: Karl Baedeker, 1910, OCLC 397759 (+ 1881 ed.)
- "Ghent" . Encyclopædia Britannica. Vol. 11 (11th ed.). 1910. pp. 919–920.
- Benjamin Vincent (1910), "Ghent", Haydn's Dictionary of Dates (25th ed.), London: Ward, Lock & Co., hdl:2027/uc2.ark:/13960/t9m32q949
- Trudy Ring, ed. (1995). "Ghent". Northern Europe. International Dictionary of Historic Places. Fitzroy Dearborn. p. 299+. ISBN 978-1-136-63944-9.

in other languages

- Nieuwen Almanach ... der Stad Gend (in Dutch), Gend: Philippe Gimblet, 1770 1770-
- Victor Van der Haeghen (1896), Inventaire des archives de la ville de Gand [Inventory of the Ghent City Archives] (in French), Gand: C. Annoot-Braeckman, OCLC 64460660
- Henri Zondervan, ed. (1917), "Gent", Winkler Prins' Geillustreerde Encyclopaedie (in Dutch) (4th ed.), Amsterdam: Uitgevers-Maatschappy "Elsevier", hdl:2027/mdp.39015068347981
