= Daniel Kinet =

Belgian aviator (1884–1910)

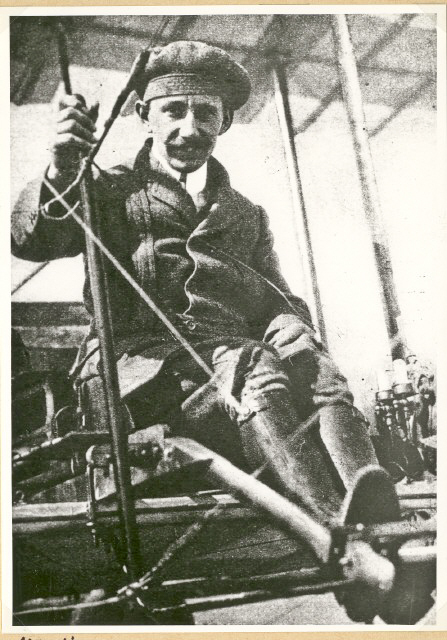
- Daniel Kinet
- Born: February 2, 1884; Jumet, Belgium
- Died: July 15, 1910 (aged 26); Ghent, Belgium
- Occupations: Automobile and motorcycle racer, balloonist, aviation pioneer
- Known for: First aviation fatality on Belgian soil
- Awards: Prize of the Aero-Club of Belgium (1910)

Daniel Marie Toussaint Kinet (2 February 1884 – 15 July 1910) was a Belgian automobile and motorcycle racer, balloonist, and aviation pioneer.

Daniel Kinet is sometimes confused with aviator Nicolas Kinet, who died on 3 August 1910 after crashing with his plane. They were not family, while some sources stated they were brothers or cousins.

== Passion for Flying ==
At the beginning of the 20th century, when flying with a self-propelled aircraft was still in its infancy, ballooning was the most popular form of aviation. Kinet was already an experienced balloonist at the age of 19. In 1902, when the Aéro-Club des Flandres was founded in Ghent, he finished third in a balloon competition. At that time, Ghent, driven by this club, became the favorite location in Belgium for every pioneer-adventurer pilot who wanted to demonstrate their flying skills.

In 1910, Kinet was a student at Henri Farman's school in France, where he earned his pilot's license on February 1 (as the second Belgian after Pierre de Caters) and became a "flying instructor" on March 17. At the flight school in Mourmelon-le-Grand, he was also the chief pilot. On April 8, he set a world record for "flying with a passenger" by staying in the air for 2 hours and 20 minutes.

== Popular Aviator ==
The Aero-Club des Flandres invited Daniel Kinet to demonstrate his flying skills during the Ghent Festival in July 1910. This would take place at the location where Henri Farman had made the first flight in Belgium in 1908. This area was a large sandy plain in the Muide district of Ghent, without any infrastructure or safety facilities.

The plan was for Kinet to perform daily flights during the festival, weather permitting, which the public could watch. Kinet arrived in Ghent on June 24. His aircraft was a biplane with a Farman undercarriage and a seven-cylinder engine. It had a wing surface of 40m².

Whenever the weather allowed, Kinet made flights that even reached up to 40 km, taking him over Evergem, the Muide, Oostakker, and Sint-Amandsberg. On July 4, during a flight, he won the Prize of the Aero-Club of Belgium – a sum of 500 BEF (equivalent to about 1850 euros today) – for the first officially recorded flight in Belgium at a height of at least 30 meters. On July 8, he flew with a passenger, a certain Falzolgher. The following day, he took another passenger on board. The flights each lasted 10 to 15 minutes and reached a height of 175 meters.

== Tragic Fate ==
The Ghent Festival began on July 10, 1910. Just before 5:30 AM, Kinet instructed his biplane to be taken out of the hangar and prepared for a flight. By 6:00 AM, Kinet made a first flight of about 20 minutes over Drongen, Mariakerke, the Brugse Poort, and the Muide at a height of 80 to 90 meters. After a short rest, he carefully checked all parts of his aircraft before embarking on a second flight during which he flew in circles above the square before heading towards Oostakker. He circled the towers of the Basilica of Oostakker-Lourdes and then landed back on the square, greeted by loud applause from the early spectators. He then checked the engine and other parts of the aircraft again.

Around 9:30 AM, he took off for his third flight towards the Brugse Vaart, in preparation for a flight to Oostende along the Ghent-Brugge-Oostende canal. He hoped to land on the beach for King Albert I's viewing stand at the Royal Villa.

As the spectators watched, the aircraft first swerved to the right and then to the left before crashing from a height of 50 meters into a potato field. According to reports, it is believed that during a maneuver to stabilize the aircraft, a tension cable from a wing or the tail rudder broke. This cable likely got caught in the propeller, causing it to seize up. Upon impact, a tree along the road was completely shattered. Only the engine and the wheels of the undercarriage were left intact. The pilot's seat was torn from its place. The accounts of how and where the pilot was found differ among witnesses.

Among the first to reach the victim were Dr. De Raeve and Alderman Alfons Siffer, acting mayor of the city. One witness went by car to fetch Dr. Claus from Oostakker. Kinet was transferred to the lazaret at the training ground, where he received first aid. He was then transported by ambulance to the clinic of Drs. Laroy and Willems on Kasteellaan in Ghent. The remains of the aircraft were transported to the hangar at the Farman Square.

After various rumors circulated regarding the nature and severity of his injuries, the "medical institution" issued the following statement in the newspapers on July 12:

"Ghent, July 12, 1910. To put an end to the conflicting rumors published by the newspapers, the doctors send the following message: Mr. Kinet, upon his admission to the clinic of Drs. Willems and Laroy, had sustained minor injuries to the head and a fracture of one hand, along with a severe internal bleeding in the abdomen. A thorough examination revealed a tear in the right kidney and probably other organs. However, the condition of the injured man did not allow for immediate surgery."

"The following day, Monday, after some improvement due to the treatment, surgery was performed to open the abdomen. The tear in the kidney was confirmed, as well as a tear in the abdominal lining. The affected areas were sewn up. The patient tolerated the treatment well."

"Today, Tuesday, after a consultation at 10 AM, the doctors found sufficient grounds for hope. (signed) Dr. Willems, Dr. Laroy, Dr. De Raeve, Dr. Claus"

== Death ==
On July 15, five days after the accident, Kinet succumbed to heart problems caused by the surgical procedures. He was 26 years old. His body was transferred on July 20 to the cemetery in Vorst (Kerkhoflaan, Alsemberg). Daniel Kinet was the first aviation fatality on Belgian soil and the twelfth worldwide.

== Memorial Stone ==
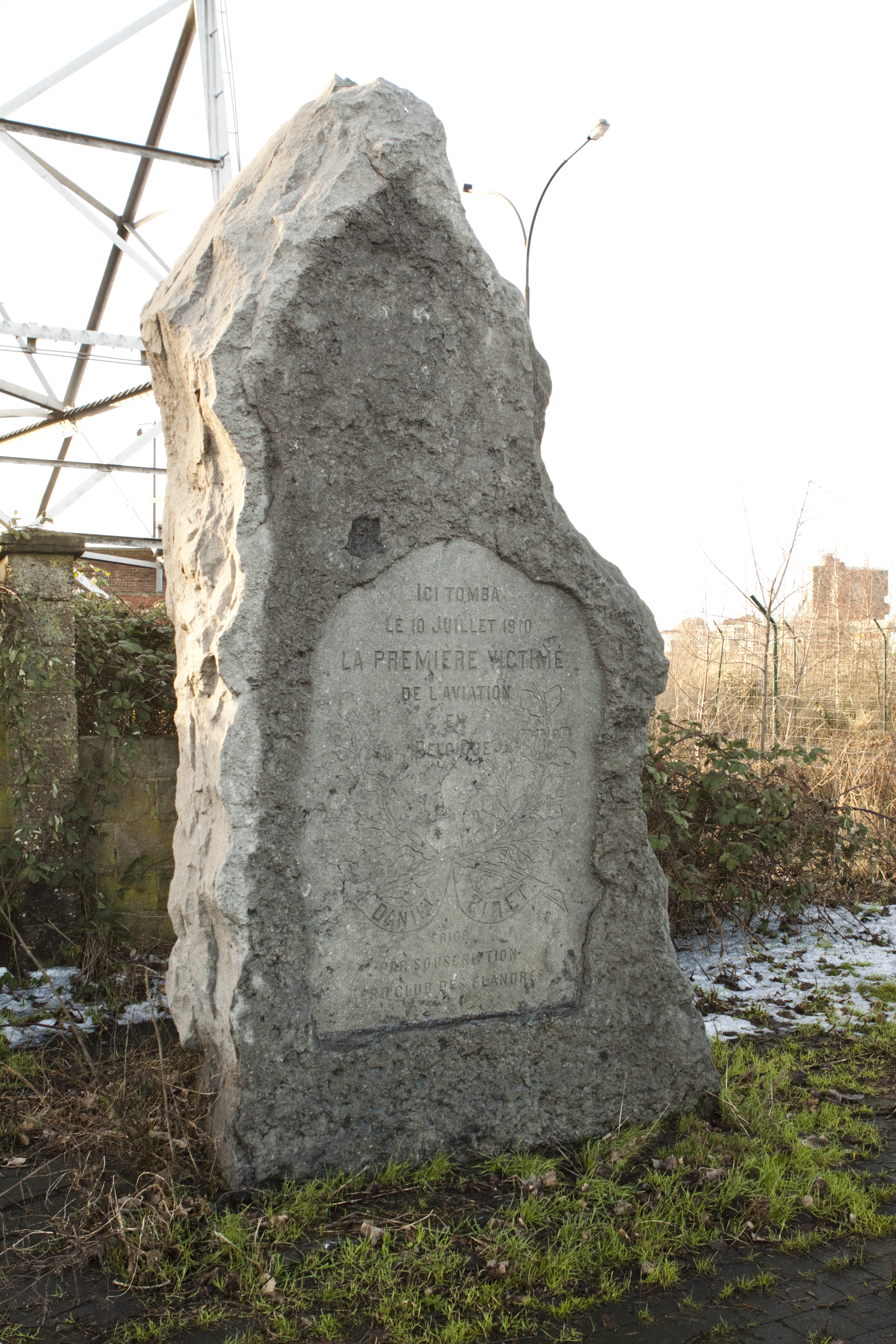
Memorial Stone

At the site of the accident (now the Singel in Ghent), a memorial stone was erected on July 10, 1912, commissioned by the Aero Club. It was designed by architect Léon David and carved from a granite rock by the Ghent Stone and Marble Company H. Dubois. The text reads:

Ici tomba le 10 juillet 1910 la première victime de
l’aviation en Belgique
Daniel Kinet
Erigé par souscription
Aéro-Club des Flandres

The monument was unveiled on August 4, 1912. After speeches by the presidents of the Aéro-Club de Belgique and La Société des Aviateurs, Auguste de Breyne, president of the Aéro-Club des Flandres, handed over the monument to the city of Ghent, represented by Mayor Emile Braun. The memorial stone still stands at its original location on the Singel, which was formerly known as Aeroplaanlaan and later Vliegtuiglaan. The location is now situated in the heart of the Ghent port area. A street near the memorial stone has also been named after Daniel Kinet.

== Legacy ==
- A march dedicated to Daniel Kinet was composed by Geo de Roo from Ledeberg.
- In response to significant events, the people of Ghent frequently produced folk songs, many of which were in French. One such song goes:

C'est Kiki, c'est Kinet qui vol
Avec sa machine à pétrole
Si Kiki n'avait pas volé
Kiki ne serait pas tombé.
