= History of urban centres in the Low Countries =

The development of urban centres in the Low Countries shows the process by which the Low Countries, a region in Western Europe, evolved from a highly rural outpost of the Roman Empire into the largest urbanised area north of the Alps by the 15th century CE. As such, this article covers the development of Dutch and Flemish cities beginning at the end of the migration period till the end of the Dutch Golden Age.

== Earliest settlements ==
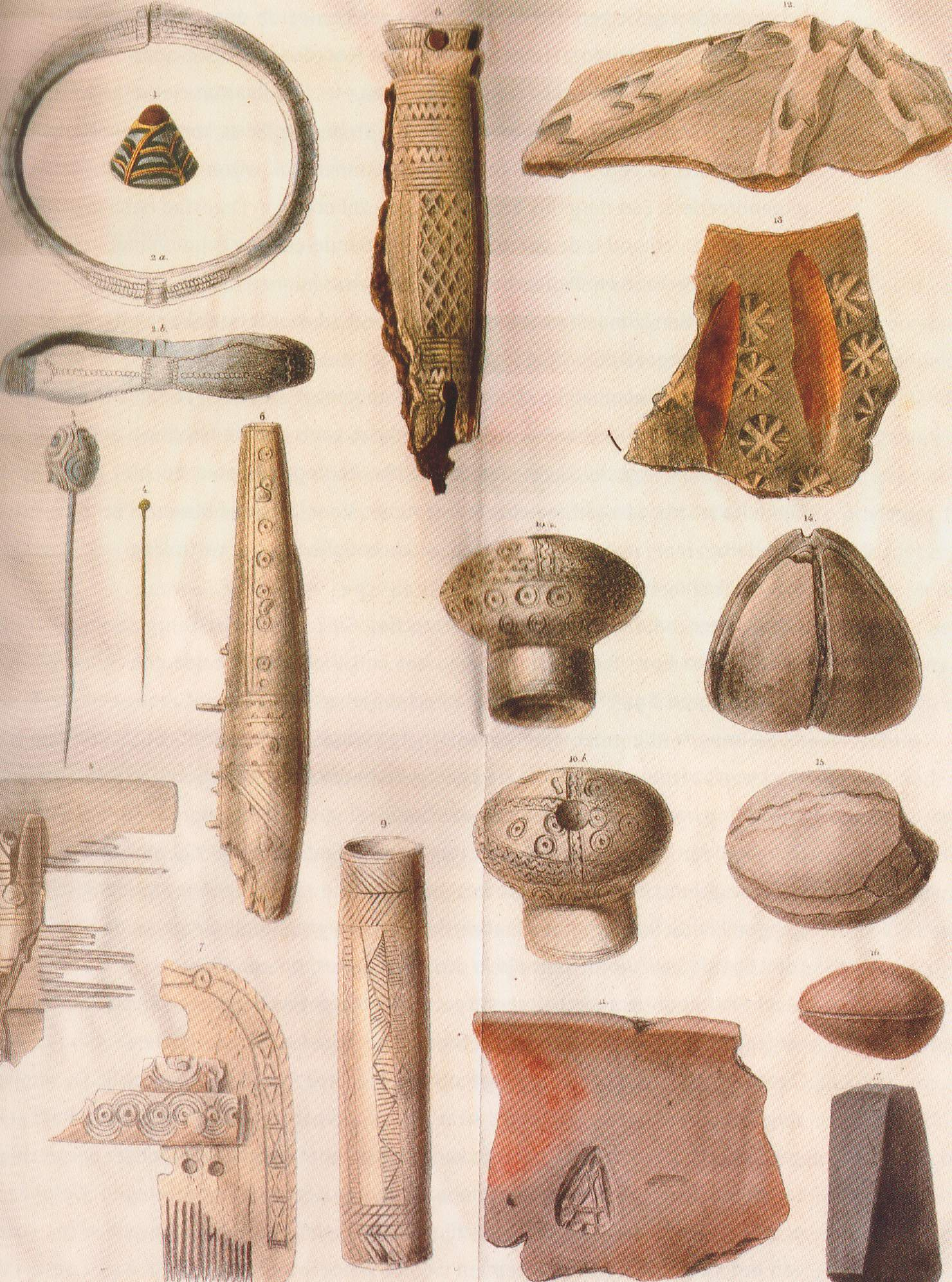
Objects found excavating the remains of Dorestad.

The northern border of the Roman Empire, known as limes ad Germaniam inferiorem, was set at the Rhine in 47 AD. The border was protected with fortresses and the Low Countries became the outer provinces of the empire, situated near the Roman-Germanic border. Probably because of the (founded) fear of Germanic incursions, Roman settlements (such as Roman villas and colonies) were extremely sparse, and Roman presence was mainly limited to three Castra (Noviomagus, near modern Nijmegen; Flevum, near Velsen; and one near Oudenburg, the Latin name for which is unknown, as well as a set of Castellum (one of which, Castellum Trajectum, would be the foundation of Utrecht). These together formed the only population centres which surpassed the native villages of the time in terms of architecture and, in some cases, population. The only possible exception was the city of Atuatuca Tungrorum, which later became one of the earliest centres of Christianity in the Low Countries.

The first large settlements arose around (the ruins of) these Castra and Castellum. Very little is known about these settlements, apart from archeological remains, as there was little literacy at the time. Based on archeological evidence, together with sparsely preserved written text it is thought that Dorestad (built near the former Roman fortifications) was the most populous and important settlement of the region; with an estimated 3,000 inhabitants, it was much larger than the remaining villages, which often had no more than 100–150 inhabitants. Dorestad seems to have been the principal trading centre of the Low Countries from around 600 CE until it started to decline in the early 9th century due to repeated Viking raids, Frisian-Frankish wars, the silting up of its waterways, and the emergence of new centres favoured by the Franks, such as Liège, Cambrai, Soissons, Herstal, Tournai and, most northerly, the neighbouring site of Nijmegen.

In 696 the Frankish king Pippin II permitted the Anglo-Saxon missionary Willibrord, whom Pope Sergius I had appointed archbishop of the Frisians, to settle in Utrecht. Willibrord built a church dedicated to St. Martin in Utrecht and from there he converted some Frisians to Christianity, laying the basis for the city to become a major ecclesiastical centre in the Low Countries.

== Sub-regional centres ==
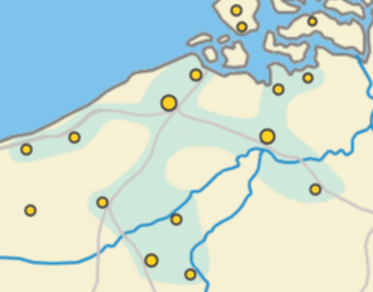
The Flemish cloth cities; c. 1350.

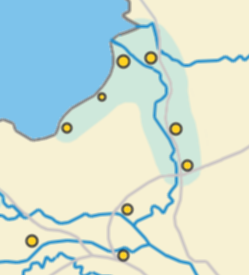
The Dutch Hanseatic cities in the East; c. 1380.

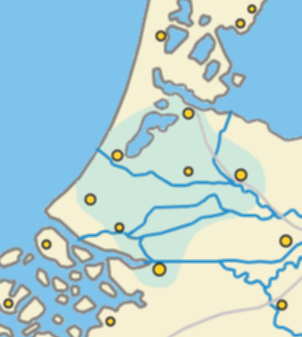
The main Hollandic urban centres; c. 1400.

From around the 10th century, mainly due to population growth and improved infrastructure, a greater number of larger settlements began to appear. Around the 11th century, some of these towns began to form networks of urban centres. In the Low Countries these appeared in 3 regions; at first in the County of Flanders in the South, then followed by the County of Holland in the North and Northern Guelders/Oversticht in the East. Towns located in the centre of the Low Countries were able to profit from the urban networks of both Flanders and Holland, without developing regional urban networks of their own. In the northern Low Countries, however, such as Frisia and Groningen, cities remained relatively isolated. Groningen is still nicknamed stad ("city") within its province, reflecting its position as the only city in the region as well as its isolation.

=== Southern development ===
The principal urban centre in the County of Flanders was focused on the cities of Bruges, Ghent and Ypres. The textile industry flourished in this area, processing wool from England, and provided the region with enormous wealth, as well as attracting various other trades. The area was notorious for its civil uprisings. When the king of France added the county to his crown lands in 1297, this sparked a popular revolt culminating in the defeat of the French chivalric army by lowborn urban militias at the Battle of the Golden Spurs.

By 1500 these cities had lost their leading position within the Low Countries to Antwerp, although they continued to play a less important role.

=== Eastern development ===
In the East of the Low Countries, a number of towns aligned themselves with the Hanseatic cities that controlled the trade in and around the Baltic Sea. This resulted in a sudden economic boom for these cities, principally Zutphen, Kampen, Deventer, Elburg, Doesburg, Zwolle and their immediate surroundings. The boom was relatively short-lived, as merchants from Holland, Flanders and England were ultimately successful at breaking into the Baltic trade themselves, ending the Hanseatic monopoly which had earned its members their wealth. Because of the comparatively short time of economic prosperity, these cities are notably smaller than for example the Flemish cities, and after Holland rose to economic supremacy around 1600, they found themselves in the hinterland of the Dutch economy.

=== Western development ===
In the 13th century the cities of Holland were less advanced than either their eastern or Flemish counterparts; for most of the 14th and 15th centuries the cities of Holland performed the role of intermediary between Flanders and trading partners oversees. Eventually they formed the bulk of the transport fleet sailing to Bruges and Ghent, which earned them considerable wealth and led to further expansion. It was not until the Fall of Antwerp that the cities of Holland (and Amsterdam in particular) would truly expand.

== Supra-regional centres ==
From around 1500 onwards two trade hubs started to emerge which for the first time truly dominated the entirety of the Low Countries. The first was Antwerp, the second was Amsterdam.

=== Antwerp ===
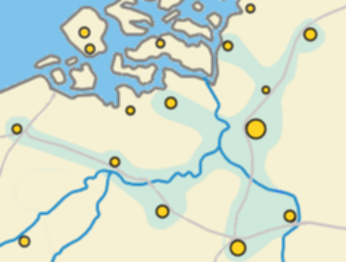
Antwerp: the economic centre of the Low Countries; c. 1540.

After the silting of the river Zwin and the consequent decline of Bruges, the city of Antwerp, with its connection to the less silting-prone Scheldt, becomes of importance. At the end of the 15th century the foreign trading houses were transferred from Bruges to Antwerp. Fernand Braudel states that Antwerp became "the centre of the entire international economy – something Bruges had never been even at its height." Antwerp's "Golden Age" was tightly linked to the "Age of Exploration". By 1560 Antwerp had grown to become the second largest European city north of the Alps. The city experienced three booms during its golden age, the first based on the pepper trade, a second launched by American silver coming from Seville (ending with the bankruptcy of Spain in 1557), and a third boom, after the stabilising Treaty of Cateau-Cambrésis (1559), which was based on the textile trade.

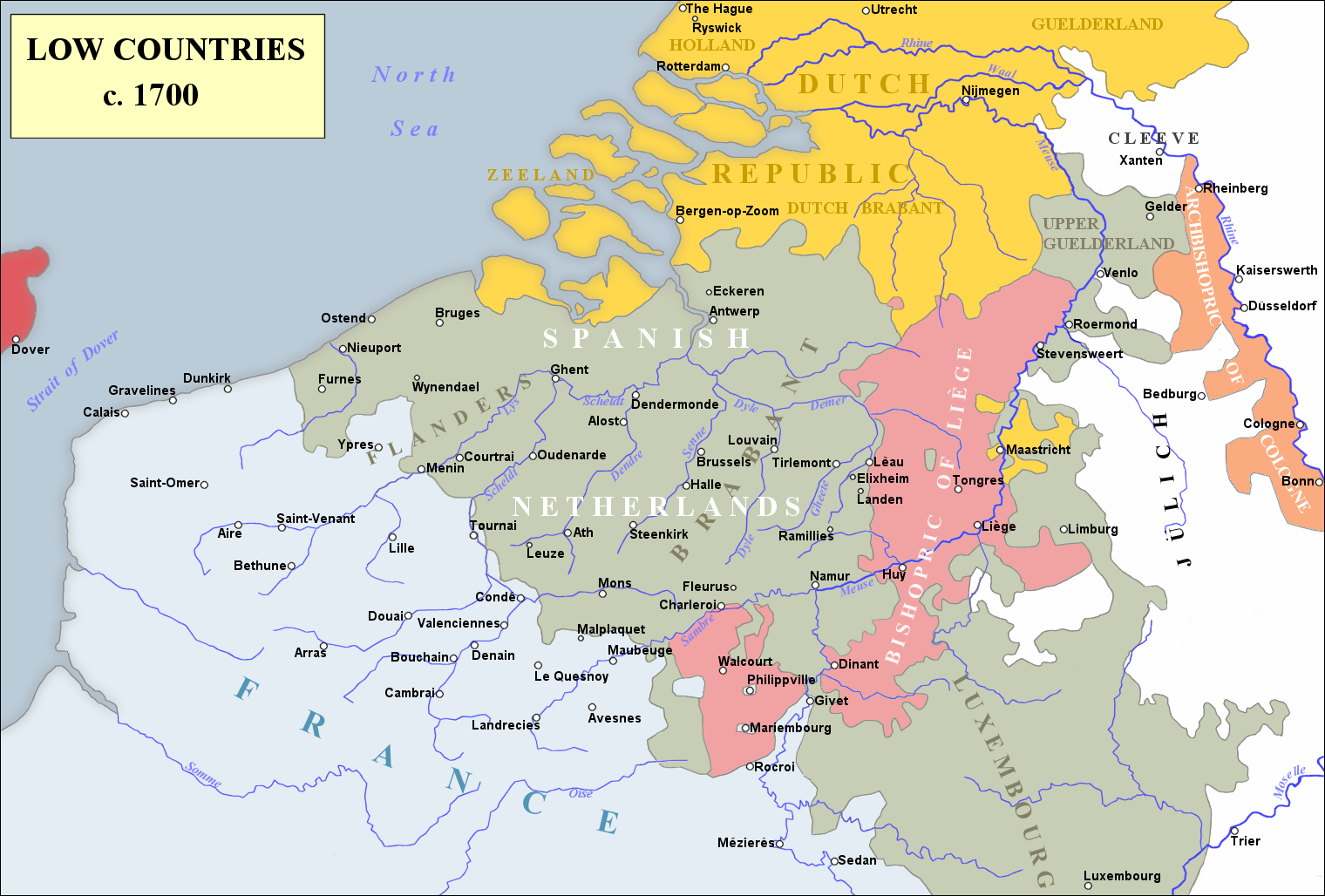
Map of the interlocking river systems and commercial cities in the Southern Netherlands all leading to the entrepot of Antwerp.

In the early stages of the Dutch revolt, Antwerp was considered to be the capital of the revolt; and the Dutch rebel army furiously but unsuccessfully sought to raise the siege of the city by the royal Army of Flanders. Nearly half of the city's population migrated after the siege, many to the cities of Holland, giving them a huge (monetary and demographic) boost, a significant factor in the Dutch Golden Age.

=== Amsterdam ===
Following the loss of the Southern Netherlands to the Spanish, and the mass influx of refugees from the Southern Low Countries, Amsterdam becomes the principal economical centre of the Dutch Republic; Europe's most important point for the shipment of goods, as well as the leading financial centre of the world. Amsterdam, positioned along the IJ bay makes an excellent port for the Dutch merchant fleet; which during the 17th century is the world's largest, and is the principal seat of the Dutch East India Company (Vereenigde Oost-Indische Compagnie or VOC).

The centralisation of France and England, the Dutch Republic's main economic competitors, as well as their access to larger amounts of raw materials and far larger manpower reserve, marked the slow decline of the Dutch Golden Age and Amsterdam with it.

== Post Golden Age ==
The end of the Golden Age saw Amsterdam diminish to the same level of economic importance as Antwerp. The latter had barely been able to establish itself as the main centre of trade in the Southern Netherlands, continually under pressure from Western Europe's new powerhouses: the much larger cities of Paris and London. It wasn't until after the Second World War that either city would again experience substantial growth. The post-war Netherlands saw the formation of the Randstad, whereas in Flanders the Flemish diamond emerged. Today both regions, powered by the ports of Rotterdam and Antwerp are agglomerating, as they are fuelling the hinterland: Germany's newly formed industries in the Ruhr.

== See also ==
- History of the Netherlands
- Cities in the Netherlands:
  - History of Amsterdam and Timeline of Amsterdam
  - Timelines of other municipalities in the Netherlands: Breda, Delft, Eindhoven, Groningen, Haarlem, The Hague, 's-Hertogenbosch, Leiden, Maastricht, Nijmegen, Rotterdam, Utrecht
- History of Belgium
- Cities in Belgium:
  - History of Bruges and Timeline of Bruges
  - History of Ghent and Timeline of Ghent
  - History of Antwerp and Timeline of Antwerp
  - Timelines of other municipalities in Belgium: Brussels, Leuven, Liège
