= Temmerman =

Temmerman is a surname. Notable people with the surname include:

- Els De Temmerman (born 1962), Belgian journalist
- Gilbert Temmerman (1928–2012), Belgian politician
- Marleen Temmerman (born 1953), Belgian politician

== See also ==
- Timmerman
