= Alfred Vanderstegen =

- Born: Alfred Théodore Marie Vanderstegen; 26 January 1869; Ghent, Belgium
- Died: 7 January 1959 (aged 89); Ghent, Belgium
- Occupations: politician, engineer, entrepreneur

Alfred Théodore Marie Vanderstegen (26 January 1869 – 7 January 1959) was a Belgian engineer, entrepreneur and liberal politician. He graduated as an engineer from the University of Ghent. He was the son of Henricus Vanderstegen and Rosa de Cavel. Current descendants are the Vanderstegen family in Ghent.

During his political career he became municipality Council member in Ghent (1907–1947), burgomaster of Ghent (1921–1946) and senator (1936–1947) for the liberal party.

== Sources ==
- Alfred Vanderstegen (Liberal archive)

Political offices
Preceded by Émile Braun	Mayor of Ghent; 1921–1946	Succeeded by Emile Claeys official

Political offices
Preceded by Émile Braun	Mayor of Ghent; 1921–1941	Succeeded by Hendrik Elias effective
