= Daniël Termont =

Belgian politician

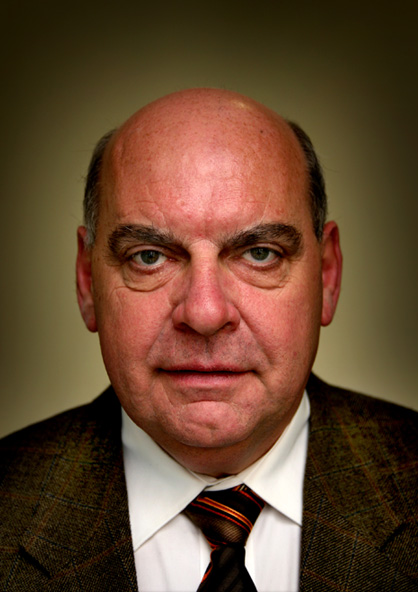

Mayor of Ghent
- In office 2007–2018
- Preceded by: Frank Beke

Personal details
- Born: 19 May 1953 (age 72) Ghent, Belgium
- Occupation: politician

Daniël Termont (born 19 May 1953) is a Belgian politician, member of the Socialist Party and former mayor of Ghent, Belgium. He was the son of shopkeepers who lived in Mariakerke. His mother's family was strongly socialistically engaged. In 1971, Daniel obtained a degree in accounting at the Stedelijk Instituut voor Handel en Secretariaat. He did his military service as from April 1972 until April 1973 and worked later on for ten years as a federal charge of LTA (Mutuality of Young Workers), the youth organization of the Socialist Unions at that time. Until 1980 he was also an information officer at the East Flemish Division (Bond Moyson) in the area Ghent-Eeklo. He has been elected to the city council since 1976. Later on, from 1983 until 1988, he was also director of De Ceder holiday centre in Deinze. He was the first director of the centre after a renovation which followed after many years of decline of the institution. Subsequently, from 1988 to 1995, he was secretary-treasurer of Bond Moyson, the year he took his first full-time political office as a councilor in Ghent. From 1995 until 2006, he was alderman of the harbour (Port of Ghent). Between 2001 and 2006 he was also alderman of festivities.

After the municipal elections of 2006 he became mayor of Ghent. He was succeeded on 1 January 2019 by Mathias De Clercq of Open VLD.

== Political career ==
Although his parents were no socialist militants, Termont came in the political environment quite easily. Termont was at the age of fourteen an active member in the socialist movement, first as a participant and later as a member of the Socialist Trade Unions (see above). He was successively founder and president of the MJA and Jongsocialisten Mariakerke. 1973, he became chairman of the department in Mariakerke SP, the Socialist Party of that time. On his initiative came in 1979, a private room, community center De Vuist, a non-profit organization whose president is still Termont. 1976, Termont participated for the first time in local elections in Ghent and was immediately elected as Councillor, a mandate he has held continuously until today. During the administration period 1989–1995, he was leader of SP. In the municipal elections of 1995, Termont was again elected and continued his professional activities to be a full-time politician. In that year his first term as alderman of the port, economic development and utilities of the city of Ghent began. During the municipal elections of 2000 he was re-elected with over 5000 preferential votes. He retained the political responsibilities of the port of Ghent and Economy, and was celebrated. Within his party SP.a, Termont began in 2001 to his third term as a member of the National party office. During the municipal elections of 2006, he was the frontman of the list of the cartel SP.A-Spirit and led his party to victory. 2007, he followed then-mayor Frank Beke as the leader of Ghent-city.

== Other mandates ==
Besides being mayor of Ghent, Daniël Termont holds several mandates in the energy sector. He is Vice President of FARYS (formerly Integrated TMVW Water Company), an intermunicipal water company, and vice president of the private gas company Fluxys which is the principal shareholder of the Belgian municipal holding company of gas company Publigas. He became president of the latter company in 2002, and also president of the Vlaamse Energieholding (as from 2004). Furthermore, Termont is vice-president and board member of the port of Ghent and directing member of Finiwo, the Intercommunal Finance for Investment in the provinces of West and East Flanders. He is also board member of the organization Buffalo NV, which is a subsidiary of the football club AA Gent, of which he is a big supporter.

In 2014 Daniël Termont became the vice-chairman of Eurocities.

== Decorations ==
In late 2014, mayor Daniel Termont was on the shortlist with 24 other nominees worldwide for the award of World Major. He came out second, after the mayor of Calgary (Cd). He was awarded the following decorations during his career:

- Officer of the Order of the Crown (Officier in de Kroonorde)
- Commander of the Order of Bernardo O'Higgins (Chile)
- Civil Medal First Class
- Freeman of the city of Asunción (Paraguay)

== Sources ==
- De Ceder, leisure and holiday centre of which Termont was the director.
- Interview with Daniel Termont Diversito's website, a blog about diversity management.
- Dial 2006, a website on the Ghent municipal elections of 2006.
- Personal website of Daniel Termont.
