= List of mayors of Leuven =

Mayor of Leuven
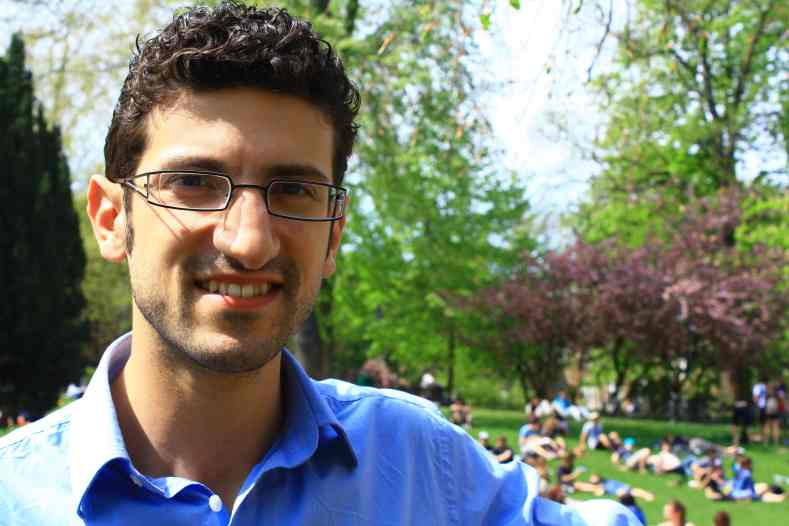
- Incumbent; Mohamed Ridouani since January 2019

This is a list of the mayors of Leuven.

== French First Republic (1794 — 1804) ==
Dyle department was created on 1 October 1795, when the Austrian Netherlands was officially annexed by the French Republic, with Leuven located on its territory.

Name	Date of birth — date of death	Term
Michel Thielens	17 November 1756 — 23 March 1822	1794 — 1797
Félix Tonnelier	26 August 1768 — 14 December 1801	1797 — 1798
Michel Claes	31 December 1759 — 6 February 1818	1798 — 1800
Joseph de Bériot	17 July 1764 — 20 October 1819	1800 — 1804

== First French Empire (1804 — 1814) ==
During First French Empire, Leuven continued to be a part of Dyle department.

Name	Date of birth — date of death	Term
Joseph de Bériot	17 July 1764 — 20 October 1819	1804 — 1808
Gérard d'Onyn de Chastre	13 April 1757 — 27 January 1837	1808 — 1811
Jan Baptist Plasschaert	21 May 1769 — 19 May 1821	1811 — 1814

== United Kingdom of the Netherlands (1815 — 1830) ==
Dyle department was disestablished in 1815 and replaced with South Brabant (Zuid-Brabant) province. The South Brabant province was then renamed simply "The Province of Brabant" in 1830 and became the central province of Belgium.

Name	Date of birth — date of death	Term
Antoine-Joseph d'Elderen	7 August 1761 — 28 December 1827	1814 — 1817
Gérard d'Onyn de Chastre	13 April 1757 — 27 January 1837	1817 — 1830

== Kingdom of Belgium (1830 — present day) ==
In 1995 Province of Brabant was split into three parts, one of which was Flemish Brabant, where Leuven is now located.

Photo	Name	Party	Date of birth — date of death	Term
	Jean De Néeff	Unionism	25 February 1773 — 6 April 1833	1830 — 1833
	Guillaume Van Bockel	Unionism	24 April 1789 — 10 March 1863	1833 — 1842
	Ferdinand d'Udekem	Liberal Party	25 September 1798 — 28 March 1853	1842 — 1952
	Charles de Luesemans	Liberal Party	20 April 1808 — 26 March 1882	1852 — 1863
	Henri Peemans	Liberal Party	21 February 1810 — 22 January 1880	1864 — 1869
	Théodore Smolders	Catholic Party	26 July 1809 — 7 August 1899	1869 — 1872
	Leopold Vander Kelen	Liberal Party	6 June 1813 — 3 April 1895	1872 — 1895
	Frederik Lints	Liberal Party	24 May 1833 — 26 September 1900	1896 — 1900
	Vital Decoster	Liberal Party	22 Oktober 1850 — 16 December 1904	1901 — 1904
	Leo Colins	Liberal Party	4 January 1851 — 29 January 1938	1905 — 1914
	Alfred Nerincx (acting during WWI)	Catholic Party	30 March 1872 — 11 October 1943	1914 — 1918
	Leo Colins	Liberal Party	4 January 1851 — 29 January 1938	1918 — 1921
	Ferdinand Smolders	Catholic Party	18 April 1858 — 29 June 1927	1921 — 1927
	Remi Van der Vaeren	Catholic Party	26 February 1882 — 13 December 1956	1927 — 1932
	Raoul Claes	Liberal Party	2 Oktober 1864 — 2 July 1941	1933 — 1938
	Remi Van der Vaeren	Catholic Party	26 February 1882 — 13 December 1956	1939 — 1941
	Richard Bruynoghe (acting during WWII)	Catholic Party	4 November 1881 — 26 March 1957	1941 — 1944
	Remi Van der Vaeren	Catholic Party	26 February 1882 — 13 December 1956	1944 — 1947
	Alfons Smets	Christian People's Party	25 July 1908 — 11 February 1979	1947 — 1952
	François Tielemans	Socialist Party	8 December 1906 — 21 December 1962	1952 — 1958
	Alfons Smets	Christian People's Party	25 July 1908 — 11 February 1979	1958 — 1976
	Alfred Vansina	Christian People's Party	9 July 1926 – 3 April 2018	1977 — 1994
	Louis Tobback	SP.A	3 May 1938	1 January 1995 — 31 December 2018
	Mohamed Ridouani	Vooruit	24 June 1979	January 2019 — incumbent

== Bibliography ==
- Gilbert Huybens, Leuvense burgemeesters geportretteerd, series « Memorabilia Lovaniensia » n° 3, Leuven : Peeters, 2016, ISBN 978-90-429-3476-4

== See also ==
- Timeline of Leuven
- House of Spoelberch
