= Nicolas Kinet =

Belgian aviator (1877-1910)

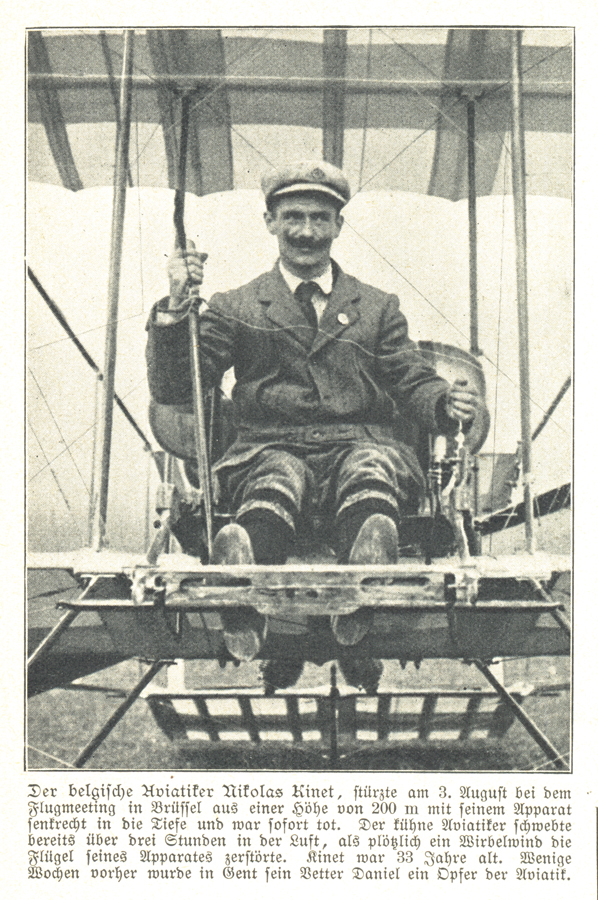
- Kinet in 1910
- Born: 24 April 1877; Liège, Belgium
- Died: 3 August 1910 (aged 33); Brussels, Belgium

Nicolas Kinet (24 April 1877 - 3 August 1910) was a Belgian motorcycle racer and aviation pioneer. He was a world record aviation holder. He died after he fell from a height of 200 metres to the ground, with the aviation engine on top of him.

Nicolas Kinet is sometimes confused with aviator Daniel Kinet, who died on 13 July 1910 after crashing with his plane. They were not family, while some sources stated they were brothers or cousins.

== Biography ==
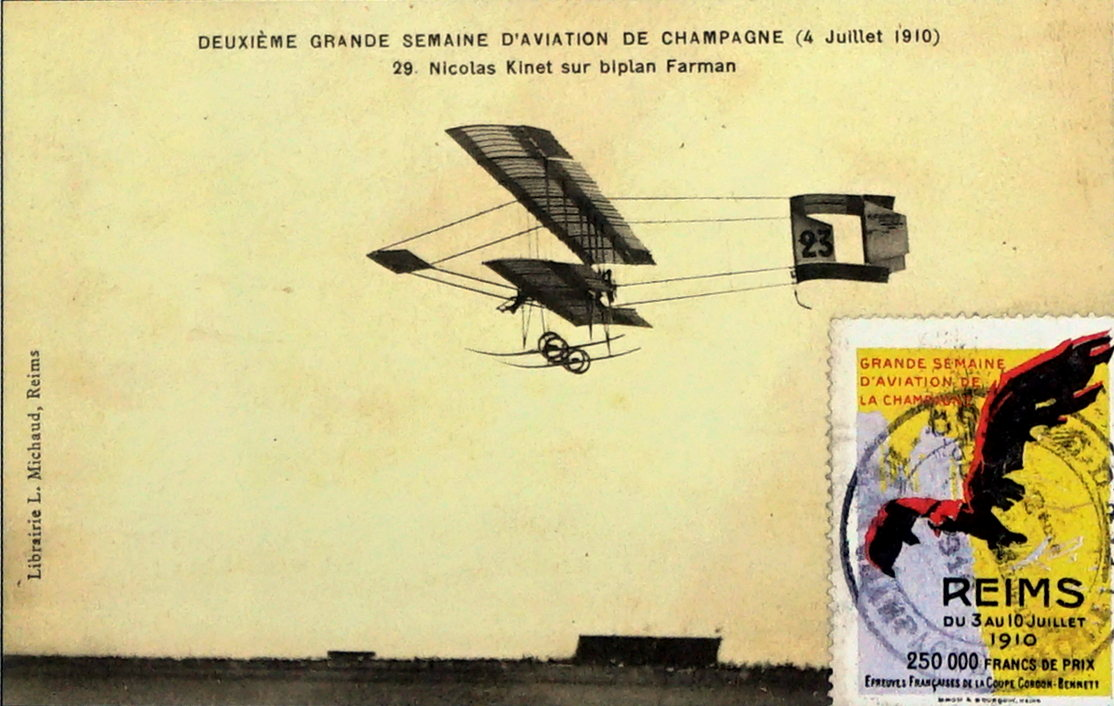
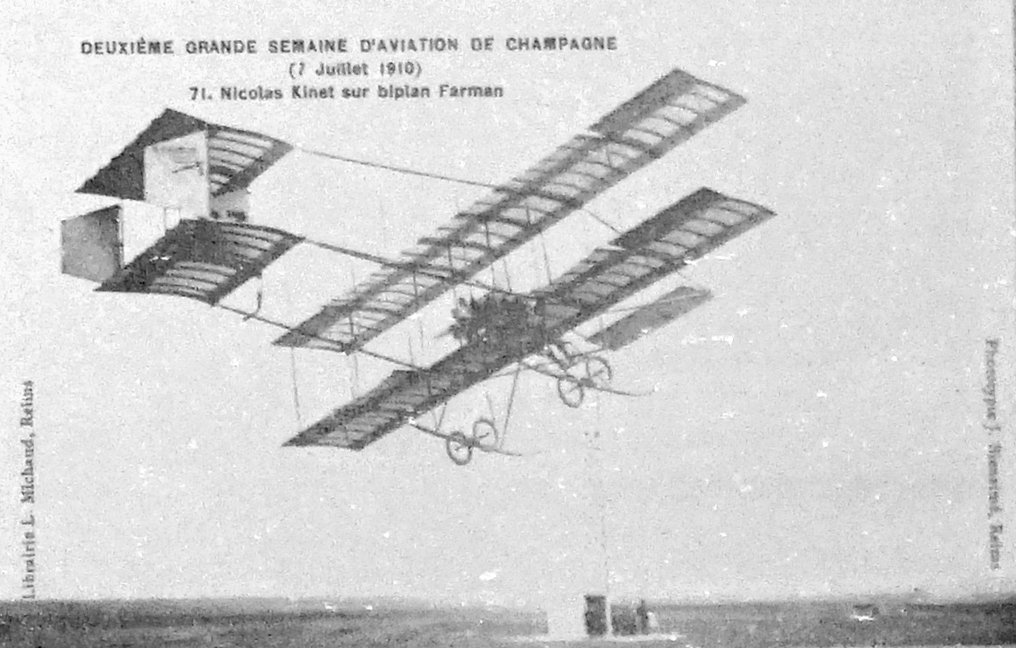
Kinet depicted on postcards: flying on 4 July 1910 (top) and on 7 July 1910 (bottom)

=== Career and death ===
Kinet was born in Liège on 24 April 1877. He started his sport career on the motorcycle, competing against Jan Olieslagers.

Kinet learned to fly in France, at the flight school of Henri Farman, where he had Charles Van den Born as an instructor. Kinet obtained the French pilot's license number 83 in March 1910 in the same week as Jules de Laminne, Joseph Christiaens and Count Malynski. He obtained the Belgian pilot's license number 10 on 31 May 1910. Shortly after getting his license, he set a world record after flying a passenger for 2 hours, 51 minutes and 9.2 seconds. He competed in flying races in Budapest, Hungary between 5 and 17 June 1910; in Reims, France between 3 and 10 July at the second edition of the "Grande Semaine de l’Aviation" and between 14 and 19 July he participated in a flight demonstration in Ans, Belgium, and between 23 July and 4 August as part of the Brussels International Exposition the "Grande Quizaine d’Aviation" was organized by the Belgian aviation club. On the first day of the flying competitions he won the landing price, after landing in the correct place in the correct way. Because of this he was the first of the pilots introduced to the King. After 11 days of competitions he was leading the general classification with a total flight time of 12 hours 26 minutes and 11 seconds; ahead of Jan Olieslagers who had 7 hours 50 minutes and 18 seconds. On 3 August 1910 while flying in his Farman III at a height of 200 metres, a tension wire broke from his rear wing. The wire ended up in the engine, which stopped abruptly. While his wife was watching, Kinet died after crashing to the ground with the engine causing further injury.

=== A cautious flyer ===
Kinet was considered to be a cautious flyer. Because of this, he was even mocked.

The Monday before he crashed, he had already experienced a life-threatening situation after one of the wires of his biplane broke during the flight. After landing he said: "See what my life depends on. Had my brother not doubled the wire at the back of my biplane, I would have fallen dead". Because he was aware of the risks, he had a life insurance policy of 30,000 Belgian francs. That amount, together with a total price money of 32,400 Belgian francs went to his wife.

== Remembrance ==
Karel Vandenborn, one of the best friends and teacher of Kinet, wanted to buy the ground where Kinet creashed for a special memorial. Also the aviation club wanted to do this. Nowadays in Ans the memorial stone for Kinet can be found which can be read in French (in weathered letters):

A la mémoire de l'aviateur liègeois Nicolas Kinet
Ici en juillet 1910 il gagne la popularité
Liège 24 avril 1877 – Tombé 3 août 1910 à Bruxelles Stockel

Another stone is at his burial place, at the Robermont Cemetery.
