= Oswald de Kerchove de Denterghem =

Belgian politician and lawyer

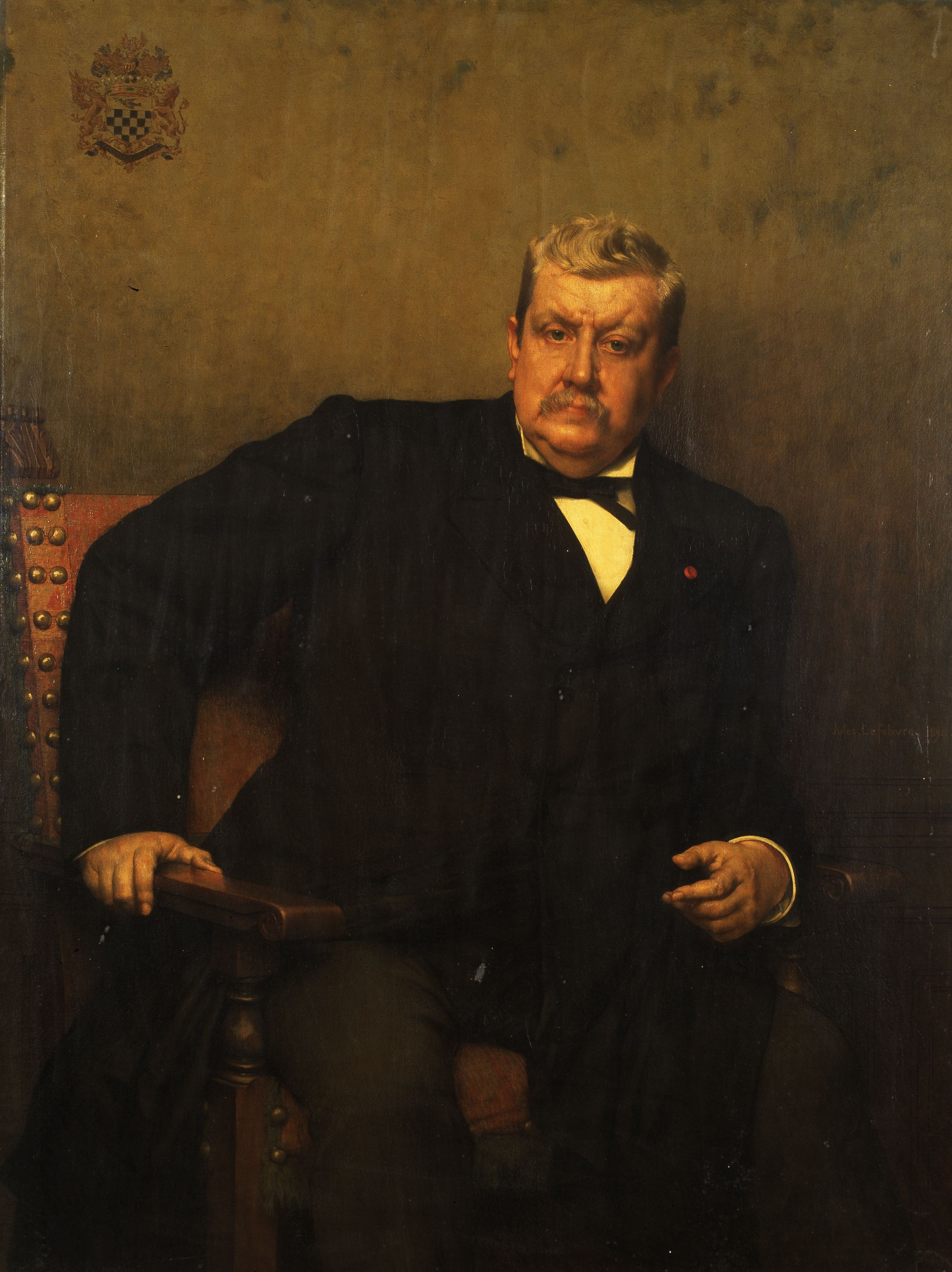
- Portrait by Jules Joseph Lefebvre, 1898
- Born: Oswald Charles Eugène Marie Ghislain de Kerchove de Denterghem; 1 April 1844; Ghent, Belgium
- Died: 20 March 1906 (aged 61); Ghent, Belgium
- Occupations: politician, lawyer

Oswald Charles Eugène Marie Ghislain de Kerchove de Denterghem (1 April 1844 – 20 March 1906) was a Belgian liberal politician. Oswald de Kerchove was a son of the Ghentian mayor Charles de Kerchove de Denterghem.
De Kerchove was a lawyer and became a liberal senator. He was governor in Hainaut from 1878 to 1884. He was an internationally recognized authority in the study of palms and orchids.

== Bibliography ==
- Oswald de Kerchove de Denterghem, Les palmiers histoire iconographinque, Paris, published by J. Rothschild, 1878.
- Oswald de Kerchove de Denterghem, Le Livre des Orchidées, 1894.
