= Laurent Merchiers =

Belgian liberal politician, lawyer and professor

- Born: 9 June 1904; Zottegem, Belgium
- Died: 5 February 1986 (aged 81); Ghent, Belgium
- Occupations: politician, lawyer, professor

Laurent Merchiers (9 June 1904 – 5 February 1986) was a Belgian liberal politician, lawyer, and a professor at the University of Ghent.

During the occupation of Belgium, working as an editor for the clandestine newspapers Vrij Nederland and Het Belfort, and was also a member of the Ghent Independence Front affiliated with the KPB. He was mayor of Ghent in a liberal-socialist coalition from 1953 to 1958. Laurent Merchiers was a member of parliament and senator (1955–1971), and minister of justice (1958–1960). He resigned as a minister after the Congo crisis.

== Sources ==
- Laurent Merchiers (Liberal archive)
