= Alfons Siffer =

Belgian politician

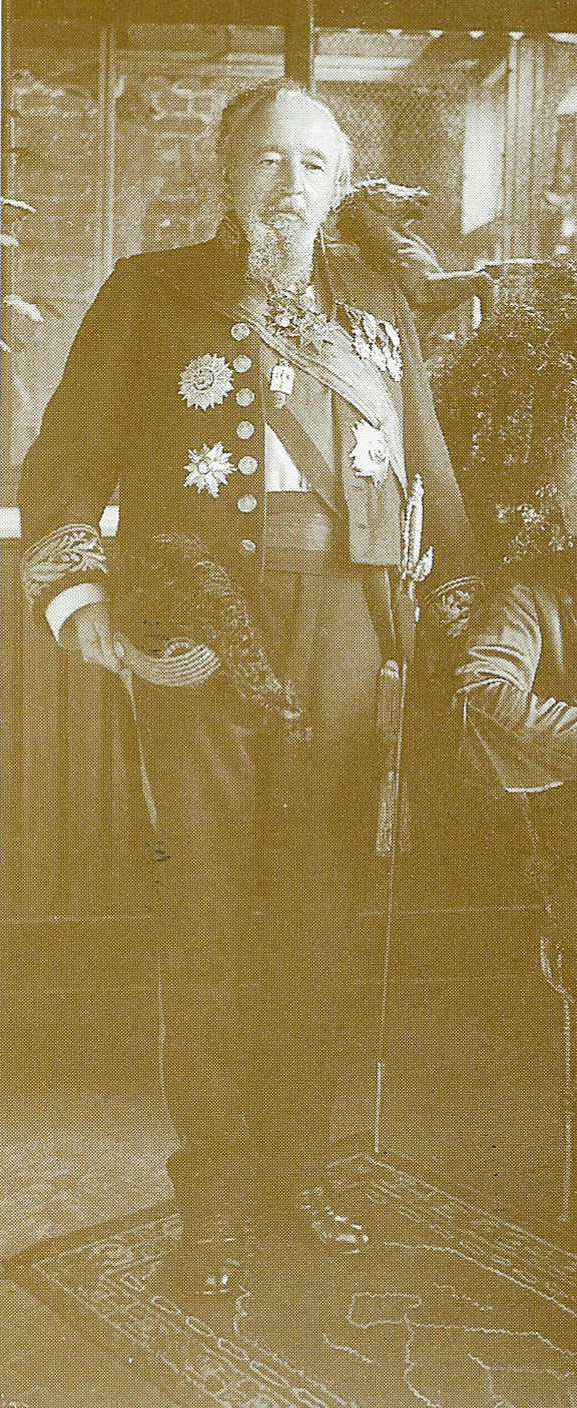
Alfons Siffer (1850-1941)

Alfons Frederik Siffer (21 March 1850 – 3 March 1941) was a Belgian politician and publisher of Catholic works, including the cultural reviews Het Belfort and Le Magasin littéraire et scientifique.

== Life ==
Siffer was born in Zomergem on 21 March 1850 and studied at the diocesan secondary schools in Eeklo, Oudenaarde and Sint-Niklaas. He briefly attended the Catholic University of Leuven, and qualified as a notary in Ghent. In 1875 he was a co-founder of the Davidsfonds in Ghent, serving as chair 1910–1930. He was an active fundraiser for Catholic schools and for local libraries throughout his life. On 14 January 1879 he married Marie Virginie Fierlefeyn. They had three children.

With capital from his wife's half-sister, Sophie Léliart, he set up in business as a book dealer and publisher, supplying textbooks for Catholic schools, annuals and bulletins for clubs and societies, luxury albums, specialist journals and newspapers. He became the main publisher to the Royal Academy of Dutch language and literature. He invested a considerable part of his profits in mining ventures in Ukraine, which were lost after the Russian Revolution.

He was elected to Ghent city council 1895–1912 and 1921–1939, serving as alderman of public works 1909–1912. As acting mayor he gave an opening address to the University of Ghent at the beginning of the 1909 academic year; this was the first to be given in Dutch. In 1911 a banquet was organised in Ghent to congratulate him on being honoured with the dual distinction of Commander in the Order of St. Gregory the Great and Commander in the Order of Leopold. In 1912 he was elected to the Belgian parliament for the constituency Ghent-Eeklo, and spoke in support of the use of Dutch in public life and in the army. Under the German occupation of Belgium during World War I he publicly distanced himself from the "activists" calling for an independent Flanders. He was re-elected to parliament until 1932, becoming "Dean of the Chamber" in 1930. He died in Ghent on 3 March 1941.

== Publications ==
As author

- Verslag over de werkzaamheden van het Gentsche Davidsfonds (Ghent, 1878)
- Lied van den Katholieken Schoolpenning, set to music by Edgar Tinel (Ghent, 1880)
- Frans de Potter en Hendrik Claeys: biographische en letterkundige studie, ter gelegenheid hunner benoeming als leden der Koninklijke Vlaamsche Academie (Ghent, 1886)
- Pater Servatius Dirks (Ghent, 1887)
- Multatuli (Ghent, 1890)

== Honours ==
- 1911: Commander in the Order of St. Gregory the Great
- 1911: Commander in the Order of Leopold
- 1932 : Knight grand Cross in the Order of Leopold II.
