= Constant de Kerchove de Denterghem =

Belgian politician

- Born: Constant de Kerchove de Denterghem; 31 December 1790; Ghent, Austrian Netherlands
- Died: 12 July 1865 (aged 74); Wondelgem, Belgium
- Occupation: politician

Count Constant de Kerchove de Denterghem (31 December 1790 – 12 July 1865) was a Belgian liberal politician. He was a son of Jean de Kerchove and Sabine della Faille d'Assenede, both descendants of Flemish nobility. He was a nephew of Jozef-Sebastiaan della Faille d'Assenede, who was burgomaster of Ghent under French rule.

As a young man Constant de Kerchove joined the French army under Napoleon in 1810 and until 1814. He established himself in Ghent as a person of independent means and in 1816 he married Pauline de Loose.

== Political career ==
He started his political career under Dutch rule in 1822, when he became deputy delegate in the provincial council and as from 1829 as an effective member. From 1824 up to 1830 he was also burgomaster of Wondelgem, where he had bought a country house some years before. In 1825, King Willem I raised him to nobility. After the independence of Belgium in 1830, he initially sided with the Orangist party which preferred re-unification with the Netherlands. On the occasion of the municipality Council elections of 1836 in Ghent, he was on the Orangist list of the Société of the Amis the l'Ordre et du Repos Public, the Orangist list of among others Charles d'Hane Steenhuyse, Hippolyte Metdepenningen, Jean-Baptiste Minne-Barth and Joseph Van Crombrugghe. A year later he was appointed as alderman and became a member of the Bureel van Weldadigheid, of which he became president in 1841. When the burgomaster Van Crombrugghe died, de Kerchove was appointed by the king as the new burgomaster of Ghent, which he would stay until 1852. Over the years he became one of the figureheads of the liberal-Catholics, together with among others Joseph Guislain and Jules de Saint-Genois. They formed a bridge between the opposing factions of clericals and anticlericals. Although during his rule, may crises hit the city, a number of public projects were completed which improved life in Ghent.

A number public works ensured the cleansing of the city and gave a first impetus to the elaboration of an urbanisation plan with long-term objectives, such as the municipal slaughterhouse and the Guislain Institute (psychiatry) and especially the establishment of an urban education network, which laid the foundation of the present public education system of the city.

In 1854, the liberals lost the municipal elections against a list of moderate liberals and liberal-Catholics and Judocus Delehaye became the new burgomaster. Constant de Kerckhove disappeared from the Ghent political stage. He served his term as a liberal senator (elected 1851) until 1855 and retreated to his outside stay in Wondelgem, where he died on 12 July 1865.

== See also ==
- Liberal Party

== Sources ==
- Constant de Kerchove de Denterghem (Liberal Archive)
