= Hendrik Elias =

Belgian politician (1902–1973)

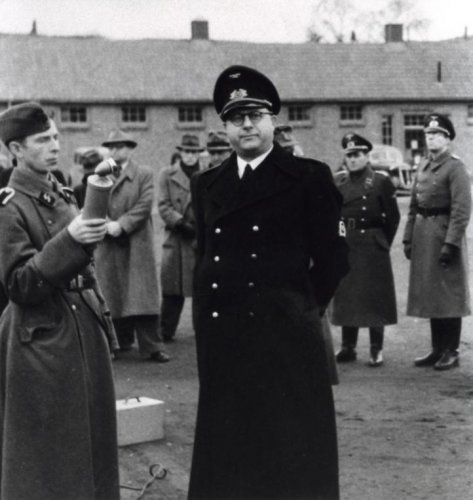
- Elias (1942)
- Born: Hendrik Jozef Elias; 12 June 1902; Machelen, Belgium
- Died: 2 February 1973 (aged 70); Uccle, Belgium
- Occupation: politician

Hendrik Jozef Elias (12 June 1902 – 2 February 1973) was a Belgian politician and Flemish nationalist, notable as the leader of the Vlaams Nationaal Verbond between 1942 and 1944.

== Biography ==
Elias was a noted academic, holding doctorates in both Law and Philosophy from studies at the Catholic University of Leuven, the University of Paris and the University of Bonn before serving in a number of leading roles in both academia and the law.

He began his political career in 1930 as the secretary of the Vlaams Nationale Verbond (Flemish National Union). He was a member of Belgian Chamber of People's Representatives from 1932 until 1944. He joined the Flemish National Union (VNV) on its formation in 1933 and soon gained a reputation as a leading moderate in the party, despite expressing a strong personal admiration for Adolf Hitler. He was appointed Mayor of Ghent after the German invasion, although he continued to oppose plans to incorporate Flanders into Nazi Germany, arguing instead for a commonwealth.

He became leader of VNV in 1942, following the death of Staf Declercq, despite opposition of Gottlob Berger, who was suspicious of his views on keeping the Flemish distinct from the Germans. Elias sought to stop recruitment to the Waffen-SS and disband the Hitler Youth. In an effort to accomplish this he encouraged recruitment into the Luftwaffe rather than the SS and achieved some success in diverting Flemings away from Heinrich Himmler's men. Elias came into competition for support from the Germans with Jef van de Wiele, whose DeVlag movement was allowed to co-exist in occupied Flanders alongside the VNV. Van de Wiele endorsed full integration of Flanders into Germany, a view not supported by the VNV. By April 1943 Elias had become disillusioned with the Nazis as they increasingly backed DeVlag and he came to argue that Nazism and Flemish Catholicism were incompatible. Despite these private attitudes Elias did not go public with his reservations. In public, he claimed a German victory was needed, supported recruiting for the Eastern Front, defended forced labor service in Germany and requisitions. Towards the end of World War II he came to co-operate more with the Nazis, fearing a communist takeover. Just before the liberation he authorized using the VNV militia in actions against the resistance.

He fled to Germany in September 1944 but took no part in the exiled Belgian collaboration movement under van der Wiele. He was arrested by the French and extradited to Belgium. He was sentenced to death and this sentence was confirmed in appeal. The Belgian government commuted it to life imprisonment. He was released on 24 December 1959 for health reasons. In 1971 he published Vijfentwintig Jaar Vlaamse Beweging, part history of the Flemish nationalist movement, part autobiography .

Political offices
Preceded by Alfred Vanderstegen	effective mayor of Ghent; 1941–1944	Succeeded by Alfred Vanderstegen incumbent mayor Edward Anseele Jr. acting mayor
