= Timeline of Leuven =

The following is a timeline of the history of the municipality of Leuven, Belgium.

== Pre-20th century ==
- 883 – Battle of Leuven (883).
- 891 – Battle of Leuven (891).
- 950 - Birth of Lambert I, Count of Louvain the first Count of Leuven.
- 1090 – Hospital established (approximate date).
- 1100 – St. Peter's Church built (approximate date).
- 1165 – Saint Michael's Church, Leuven built.
- 1183 – Leuven becomes part of the Duchy of Brabant of the Holy Roman Empire.
- 1222 – Saint Quentin's Church built (approx. date).
- 1225 – Arnold Nobel becomes mayor.
- 1230 – Saint Jacob's Church, Leuven built.
- 1317 – Lakenhal (Leuven) (cloth hall) built.
- 1356 - Louvain was the scene of the Joyeuse Entrée of Wenceslas.
- 1379 – Defenestration of Leuven (political unrest).
- 1425 – Old University of Leuven founded by John IV, Duke of Brabant.
- 1463 – Leuven Town Hall built.
- 1474 – Printing press in operation.
- 1497 – St. Peter's Church rebuilt.
- 1502 – Erasmus moves to Leuven.
- 1547 - Leuven Vulgate edited by Hentenius published in Louvain.
- 1571 – City Archive relocated to City Hall.
- 1635 – June–July: Siege of Leuven.
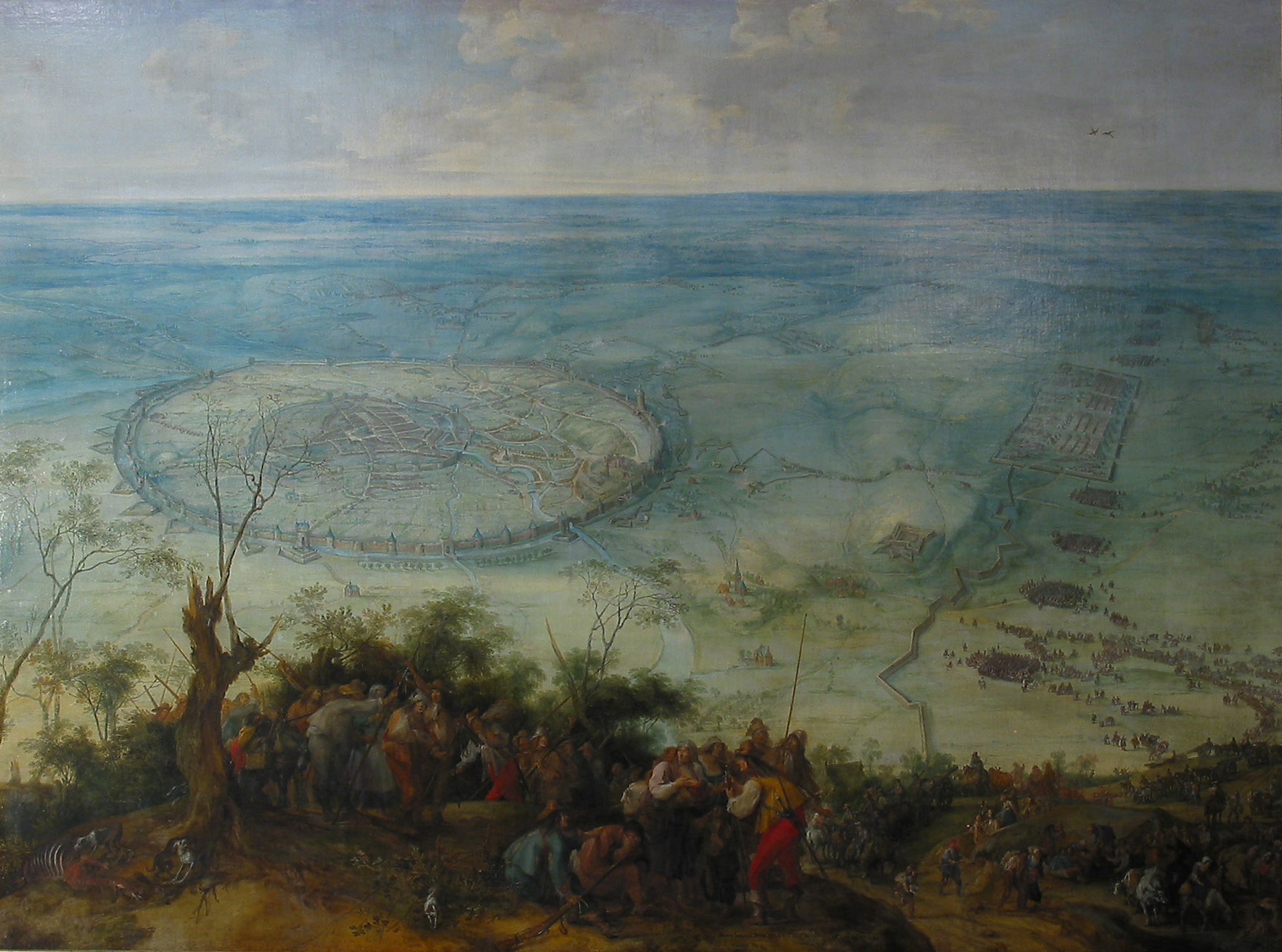
  Siege of Leuven in 1635
- 1717 – Artois brewery in business.
- 1727 – Public celebration on 10 November of the third centenary of the university's founding.
- 1738 – Hortus Botanicus Lovaniensis (botanical garden) established.
- 1786 – Seminary established.
- 1795 – City becomes part of the Dyle (department) of the French First Republic.
- 1804 – City becomes part of the First French Empire.
- 1815 – City becomes part of the United Kingdom of the Netherlands.
- 1830 – City becomes part of the Kingdom of Belgium.
- 1831 – 12 August: Battle of Leuven (1831).
- 1834 – Catholic University of Leuven established.
- 1837 - Leuven railway station opened.
- 1843 – Heilige Drievuldigheidscollege (school) established.
- 1867 – Leuven City Theatre built on Statiestraat.
- 1883 – Population: 36,813.
- 1899 – Keizersberg Abbey founded.

== 20th century ==
- 1903 – K. Stade Leuven football club formed.
- 1904 - Population: 42,194.
- 1914
  - Burning of Louvain Library of the Catholic University of Leuven destroyed.
  - Population: 42,490.
- 1919 – Population: 40,069.
- 1921
  - Post war reconstruction well underway, about 700 out of 1,200 houses had been rebuilt.
  - New purpose-built library was begun, helped by John Rylands Library in Manchester.
- 1928
  - UZ Leuven (hospital) active.
  - Library of the Catholic University of Leuven rebuilt.
- 1940 – Library of the Catholic University of Leuven destroyed again.
- 1947 – Alfons Smets becomes mayor.
- 1967 – November: French–Flemish Affaire de Louvain begins.
- 1968
  - Katholieke Universiteit Leuven established.
  - Lemmensinstituut (music conservatory) active.
  - Studio 1 cinema in business.
- 1977
  - Heverlee, Kessel-Lo, and Wilsele become part of city.
  - Alfred Vansina becomes mayor.
- 1982 – Marktrock music fest begins.
- 1988 – Vlaams Filmmuseum en -archief (Flemish film museum) established.
- 1995
  - Louis Tobback becomes mayor.
  - City becomes part of the Flemish Brabant province.
  - Katholieke Hogeschool Leuven (school) established.
- 1998 – Grand Béguinage designated an UNESCO World Heritage Site.

== 21st century ==
- 2002
  - Oud-Heverlee Leuven football club formed.
- 2008 – Anheuser-Busch InBev headquartered in city.
- 2011 – Cyclocross Leuven begins.
- 2013 – Population: 97,656.
- 2021 - 2021 UCI Road World Championships road race events finish in Leuven.

== See also ==
- Leuven history
- History of Leuven
- List of mayors of Leuven
- List of historical monuments in Leuven
- Other names of Leuven
- List of colleges of Leuven University
- Timelines of other municipalities in Belgium: Antwerp, Bruges, Brussels, Ghent, Liège

== Bibliography ==
Published in the 18th-19th c.

- Thomas Nugent (1749), "Lovain", The Grand Tour, vol. 1: Netherlands, London: S. Birt, hdl:2027/mdp.39015030762598
- "Louvain". Gazetteer of the Netherlands. Attributed to Clement Cruttwell. London: G.G.J. and J. Robinson. 1794.
- Abraham Rees (1819), "Louvain, a city of France", The Cyclopaedia, London: Longman, Hurst, Rees, Orme & Brown, hdl:2027/uc2.ark:/13960/t5n87hg3d
- "Louvain". Galignani's Traveller's Guide through Holland and Belgium (4th ed.). Paris: A. and W. Galignani. 1822. hdl:2027/njp.32101073846667.
- William Henry Overall, ed. (1870). "Louvain". Dictionary of Chronology. London: William Tegg. hdl:2027/uc2.ark:/13960/t9m32q949 – via HathiTrust.
- "Louvain", Handbook for Travellers in Holland and Belgium (20th ed.), London: John Murray, 1881, hdl:2027/hvd.hn2ha2
- W. Pembroke Fetridge (1885), "Louvain", Harper's Hand-Book for Travellers in Europe and the east, New York: Harper & Brothers

Published in the 20th c.

- "Louvain". Chambers's Encyclopaedia. Vol. 6. London. 1901. hdl:2027/uc2.ark:/13960/t7zk5ms79.
- "Louvain", Belgium and Holland (15th ed.), Leipzig: Karl Baedeker, 1910, OCLC 397759 (+ 1881 ed.)
- "Louvain" . Encyclopædia Britannica. Vol. 17 (11th ed.). 1910. p. 67.
- "Louvain". Belgium. Grieben's Guide Books. Vol. 141. London: Williams & Norgate. 1910. hdl:2027/uiuc.3096224_001.
- "Louvain", Traveller's Handbook for Belgium and the Ardennes, London: T. Cook & Son, 1921
- "Louvain" . Encyclopædia Britannica. Vol. 31 (12th ed.). 1922.
- Trudy Ring, ed. (1995). "Louvain". Northern Europe. International Dictionary of Historic Places. Fitzroy Dearborn. ISBN 978-1-136-63944-9.
