= Frank Beke =

Belgian politician

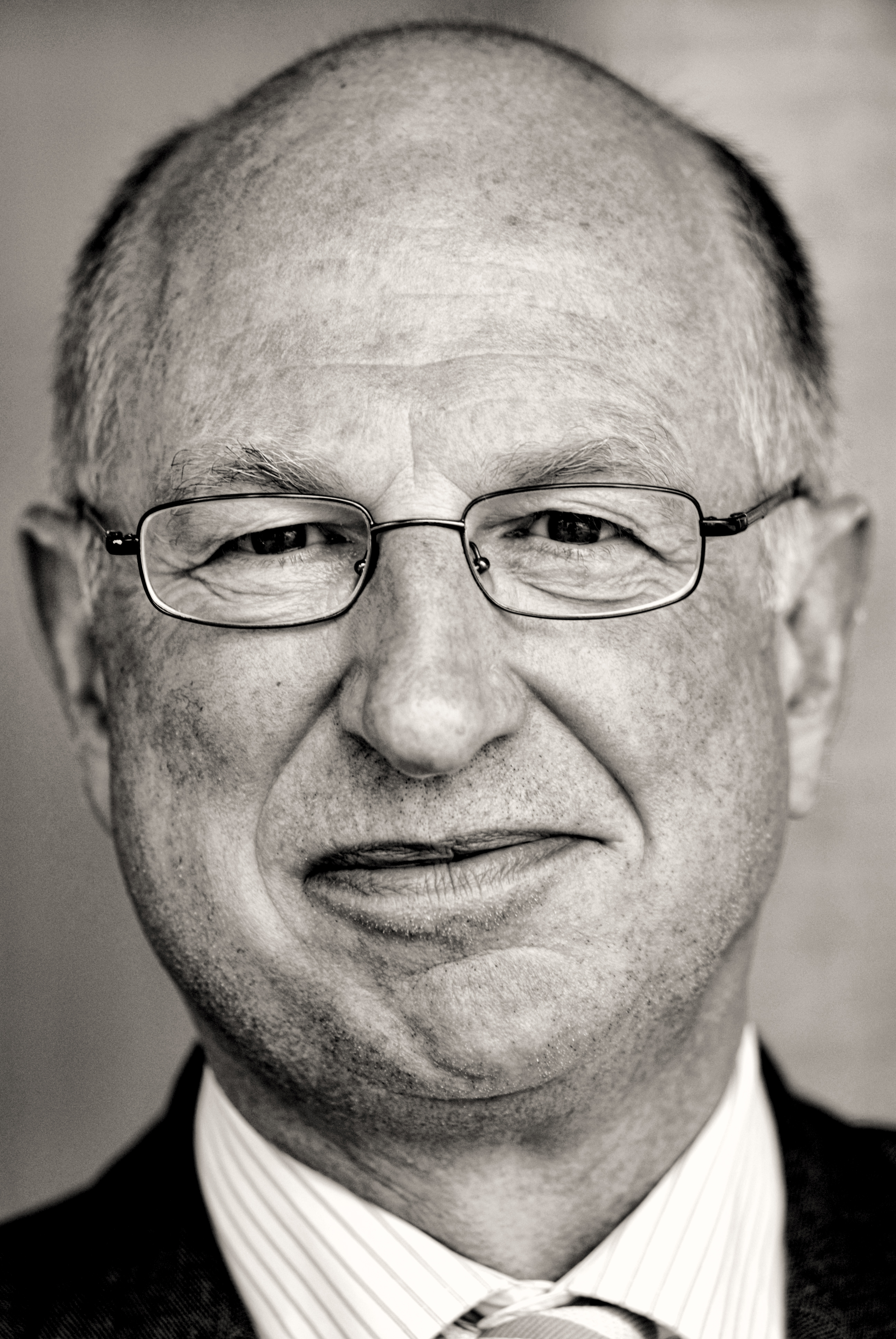
Beke in 2006

Frank Beke (born 5 August 1946 in Ghent, Belgium) is a Flemish politician of the Socialistische Partij Anders. He served as Mayor of Ghent from 1995 to 2006, and as city councilor in the same city from 1983 to 2006.
