= Jean-Baptiste Minne-Barth =

Belgian Orangist politician and lawyer

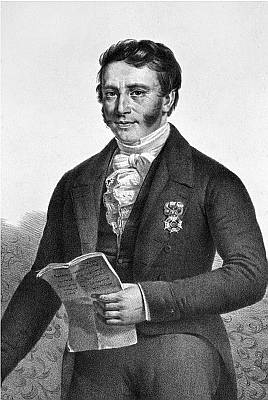
- Born: Jean-Baptiste Minne-Barth; 2 September 1796; Ghent, Austrian Netherlands
- Died: 17 February 1851 (aged 54); Ghent, Belgium
- Occupation: politician

Jean-Baptiste Minne-Barth (2 September 1796 – 17 February 1851) was a lawyer and Belgian Orangist politician.

He was a municipality Council member (1830–1841) and burgomaster of Ghent (1837–1840). Jean-Baptiste Minne-Barth became President of the University of Ghent in 1846.

== Sources ==
- Jean-Baptiste Minne-Barth (Liberal archive)
