= Charles de Kerchove de Denterghem =

Belgian engineer and liberal politician

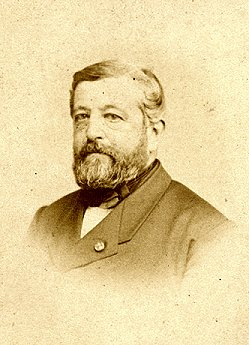
- Born: Charles de Kerchove de Denterghem; 1819; United Kingdom of the Netherlands
- Died: February 1882 (aged 62–63); Belgium
- Occupations: politician, engineer

Count Charles de Kerchove de Denterghem (1819–1882) was a Belgian engineer and liberal politician. He was a son of the Ghent burgomaster Constant de Kerchove de Denterghem. His son Oswald would become Provincial Governor of Hainaut.

Charles de Kerchove de Denterghem was burgomaster of Ghent (1857–1881), provincial Council member for East Flanders and senator for the liberal party. Under his rule the municipal public education in Ghent would be significantly expanded. A street in Ghent is named after him, the Charles de Kerchove Lane. He was succeeded as burgomaster of Ghent, by his son-in-law Hippolyte Lippens. In 1875, he became President of the Maatschappij voor Hofbouw- en Kruidtuinkunde and a strong supporter of the Gentse Floraliën, which would become an international fair on botany.

== Sources ==
- Charles de Kerchove de Denterghem (Liberal Archive)
