= Gilbert Temmerman =

Belgian politician

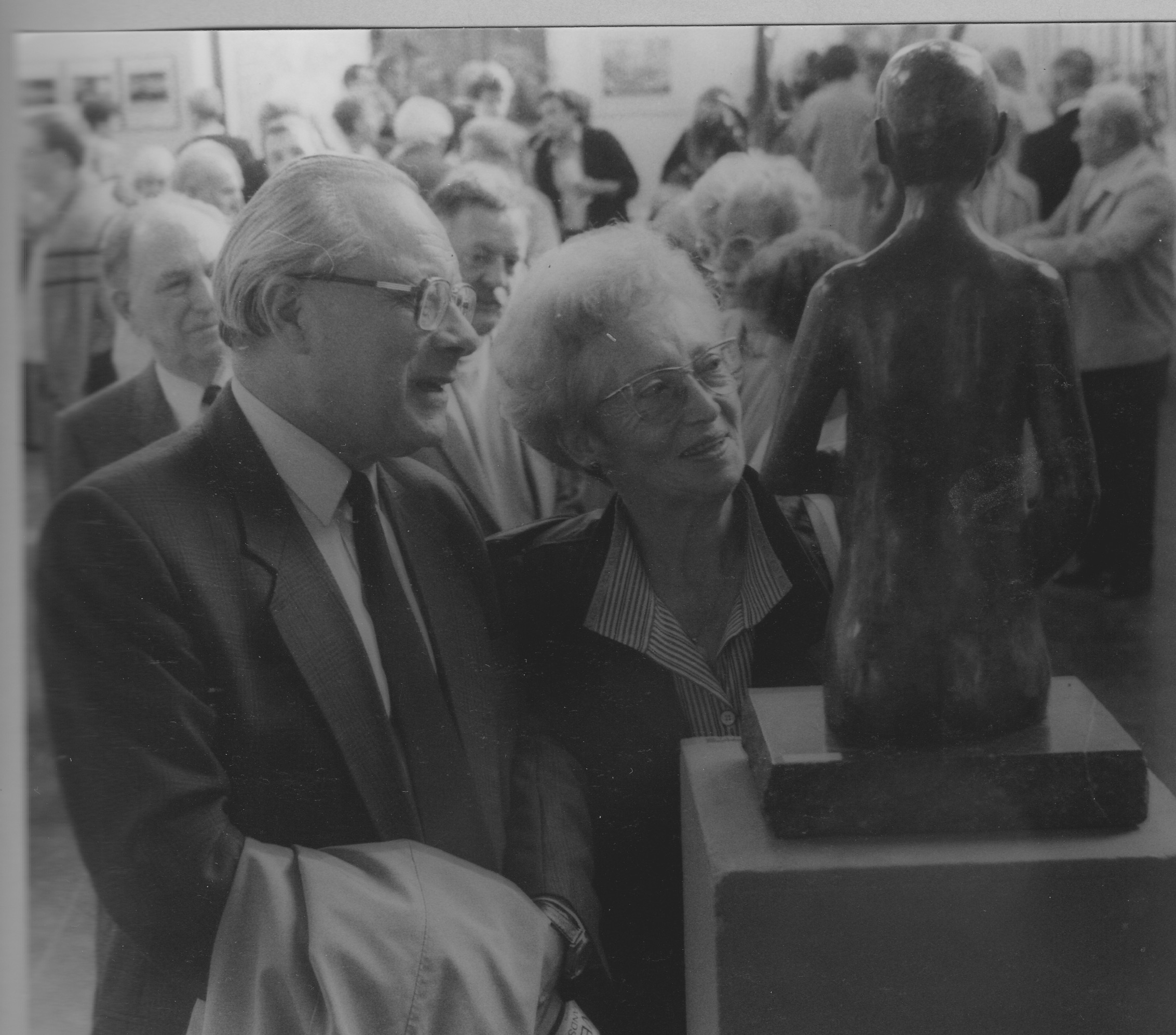
Gilbert Temmerman and his wife

Gilbert Temmerman (February 25, 1928 – January 19, 2012) was a Belgian politician. He served as a member of the Belgian Federal Parliament from 1971 to 1989. In 1989, Temmerman became the first Socialist Mayor of the city of Ghent, in the country's Flemish region. He held the office of mayor from 1989 to 1994. Additionally, was appointed a Minister of State in 1992.

Gilbert Temmerman died on January 19, 2012, at the age of 83.
