= Joseph Van Crombrugghe =

Dutch politician

Joseph van Crombrugghe
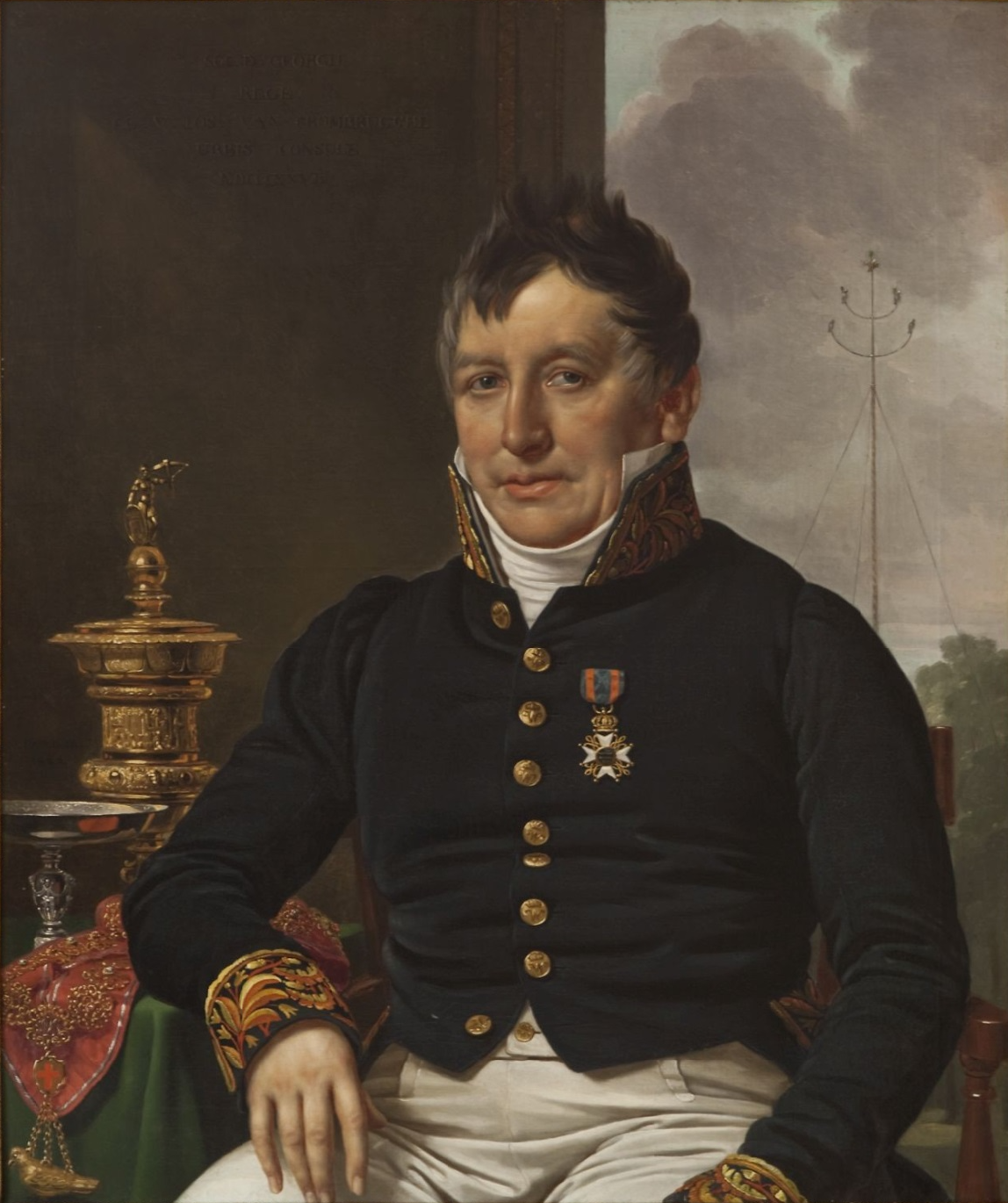
- Joseph Van Crombrugghe
- Born: 22 September 1770; Ghent, Austrian Netherlands
- Died: 10 March 1842 (aged 71); Ghent, Belgium
- Occupations: Politician; lawyer

Joseph Jan van Crombrugghe (22 September 1770 – 10 March 1842) was a lawyer and a politician in the United Kingdom of the Netherlands and later in Belgium.

He was member of the provincial council (Dutch: Provinciale Staten) of East Flanders (1816–1817), member of the House of Commons of the Staten-Generaal (1817–1824), burgomaster of Sint-Martens-Leerne (1820–1825), burgomaster of Ghent (1825–1836, 1840–1842) and a member of the Provincial Council of East Flanders (1836–1842) for the liberal party.

== Sources ==
- Joseph Van Crombrugghe (Liberal archive)
- Mr. J.J. van Crombrugghe at the Dutch parliament website
