= Émile Braun =

Belgian engineer and politician

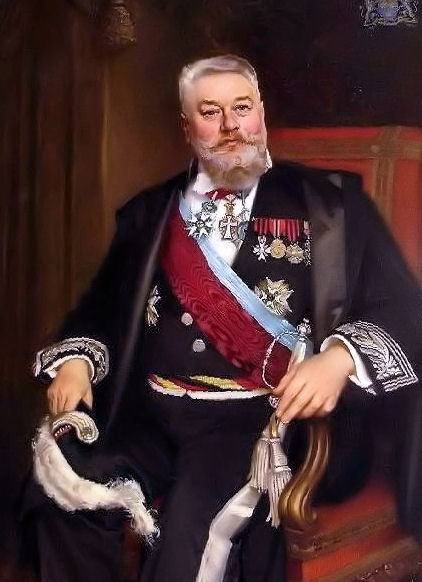
- Baron Braun
- Born: 2 December 1849; Nivelles, Walloon Brabant, Belgium
- Died: 30 August 1927 (aged 77); Vichy, Belgium
- Occupations: industrialist, politician

Émile, Baron Braun (2 December 1849 – 30 August 1927) was an engineer, Belgian liberal politician and manager of companies in the textile industry.

He was provincial Council member for East Flanders (1891–1898), mayor of Ghent (1895–1921) and a member of parliament (1900–1925) for the liberal party. While he was mayor, the World Fair of Ghent took place in 1913–1914. Emile Braun was raised to nobility in 1922. The people from Ghent gave him the nickname Miele Zoetekoeke i.e. Emile sweet-cake.

== Honours ==
- 1919 : Grand officer in the Order of the Crown.
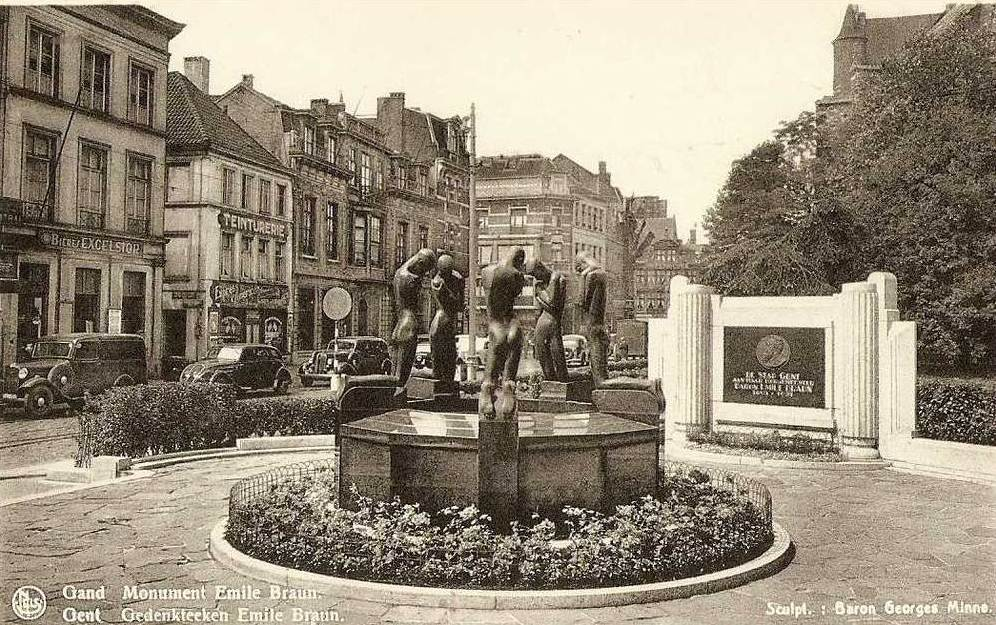
The original Emile Braun Monument

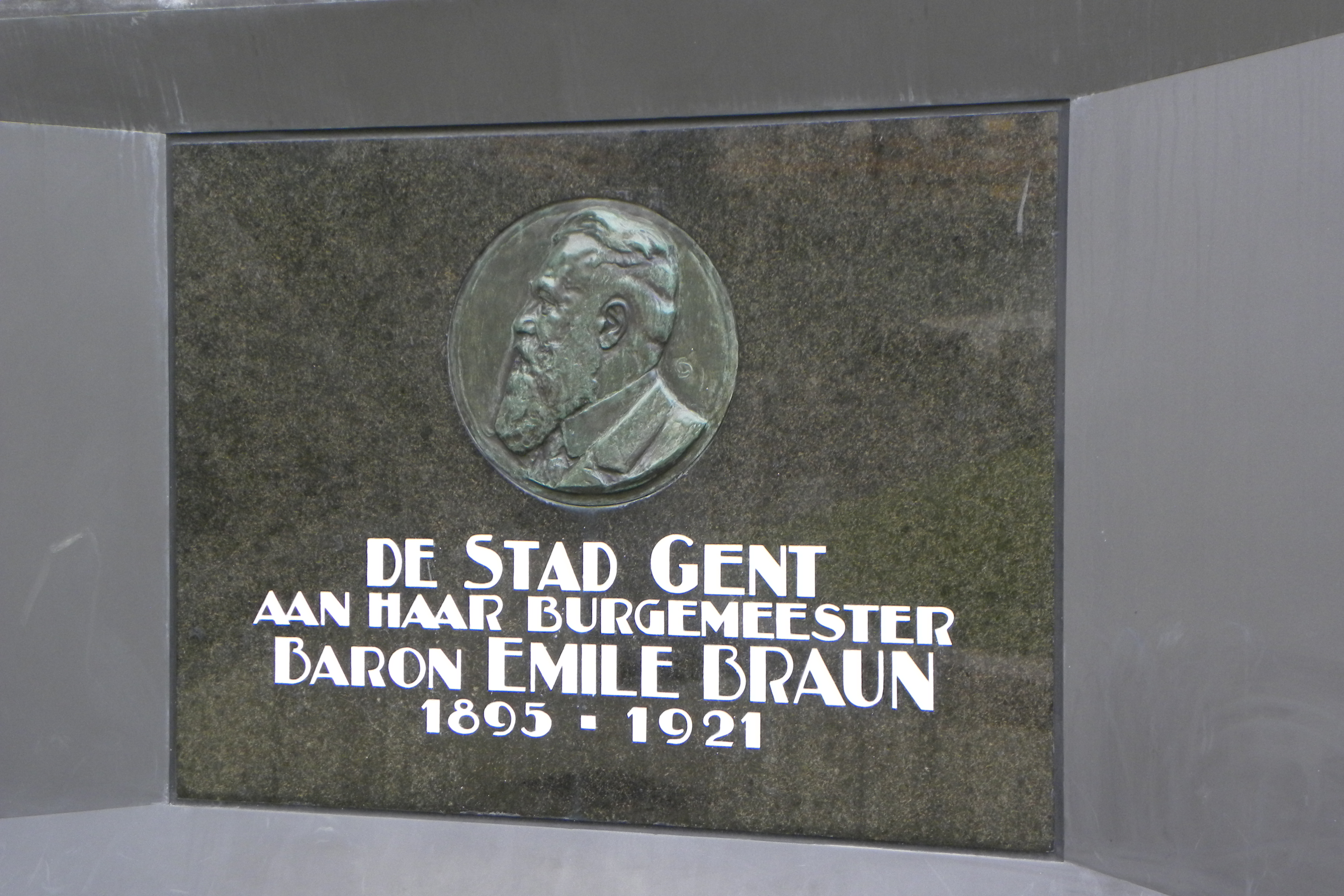
Emile Braun plaque in Ghent (at Emile Braun square).

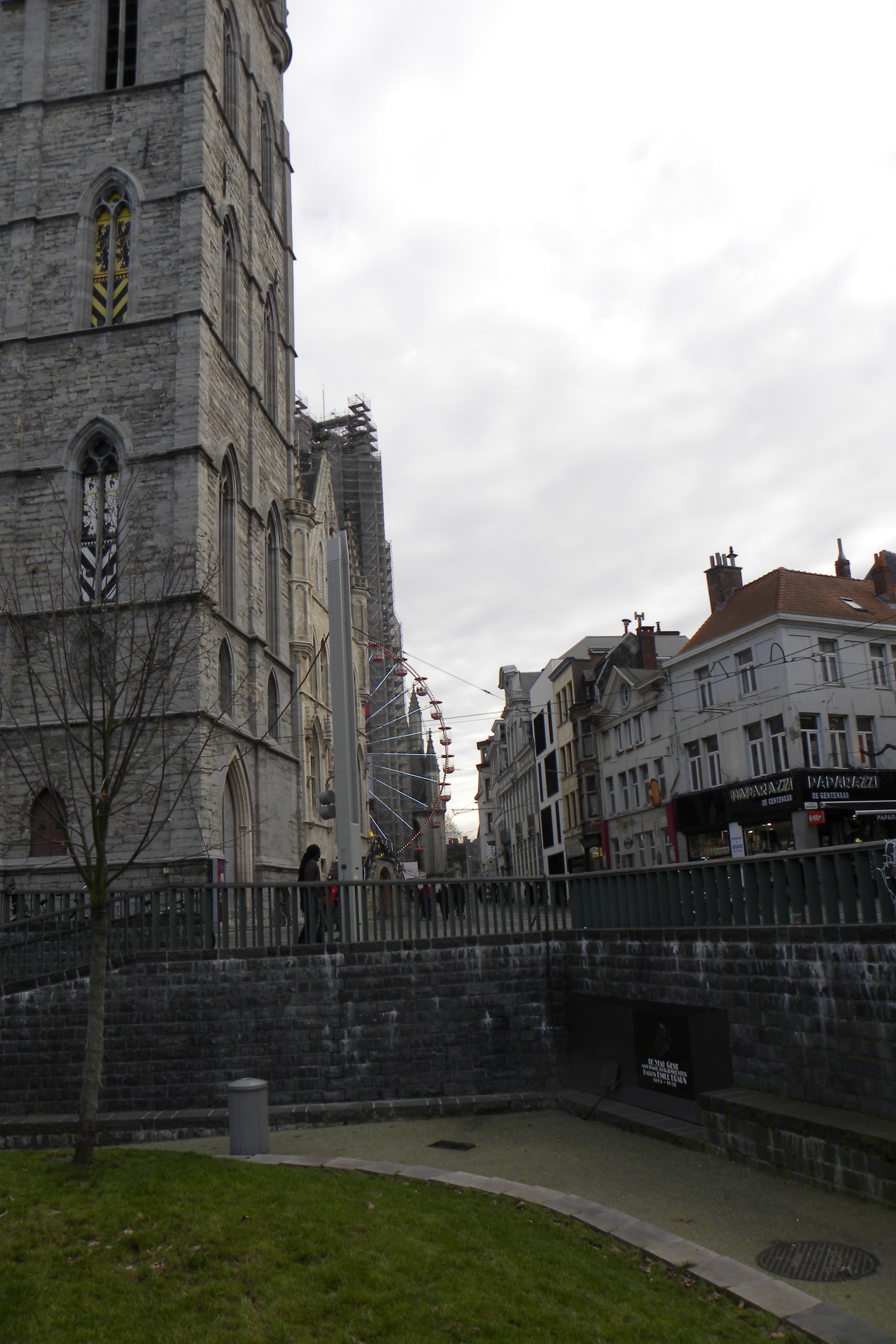
Location of the Emile Braun memorial plaque in central Ghent in 2013.

== Sources ==
- Emile Braun (Liberal Archive)
