= 2001 in Belgian television =

| List of years in Belgian television |
- … 1991; 1992; 1993; 1994; 1995; 1996; 1997; 1998; 1999; 2000; 2001; 2002; 2003; 2004; 2005; 2006; 2007; 2008; 2009; 2010; 2011 …
- Art; Archaeology; Architecture; Literature; Music; Philosophy; Science; +...

This is a list of Belgian television related events from 2001.

== Events ==
- 14 April – Singer Sam Gooris wins the first season of Big Brother VIPs.
- 16 December – Ellen Dufour wins the second season of Big Brother.

== Television shows ==
=== 1990s ===
- Samson en Gert (1990–present)
- Familie (1991–present)
- Wittekerke (1993–2008)
- Thuis (1995–present)
- Wie wordt multimiljonair? (1999–2002)
- Wizzy & Woppy (1999–2007)

=== 2000s ===
- Big & Betsy (2000–2003)
- Big Brother (2000–2007)

== Networks and services ==
=== Conversions and rebrandings ===
| Old network name | New network name | Type | Conversion Date | Notes | Source |
|---|---|---|---|---|---|
| YoungTV | AB3 | Cable and satellite | 6 October | | |

== Deaths ==
- 19 August – Former television journalist Henri-Francois Van Aal dies in Alicante, Spain.

== See also ==
- 2001 in Belgium
