= 1996 in Belgian television =

List of years in Belgian television
- … 1986; 1987; 1988; 1989; 1990; 1991; 1992; 1993; 1994; 1995; 1996; 1997; 1998; 1999; 2000; 2001; 2002; 2003; 2004; 2005; 2006 …
- Art; Archaeology; Architecture; Literature; Music; Philosophy; Science; +...

This is a list of Belgian television related events from 1996.

== Events ==
- January – The management of BRTN is fired following a 1995 report by McKinsey & Company critical of the bureaucracy and politicisation of the broadcaster. They were replaced with a smaller, more independent staff.
- 9 March - Lisa del Bo is selected to represent Belgium at the 1996 Eurovision Song Contest with her song "Liefde is een kaartspel". She is selected to be the fortieth Belgian Eurovision entry during Eurosong held at the Knokke Casino in Knokke.
- 1 November – Belgian TV host Jan Theys dies at age 62.

== Television shows ==
=== 1990s ===
- Jambers
- Samson en Gert (1990–present)
- Familie (1991–present)
- Wittekerke (1993-2008)
- Thuis (1995–present)
