= 1994 in Belgian television =

List of years in Belgian television
- … 1984; 1985; 1986; 1987; 1988; 1989; 1990; 1991; 1992; 1993; 1994; 1995; 1996; 1997; 1998; 1999; 2000; 2001; 2002; 2003; 2004 …
- Art; Archaeology; Architecture; Literature; Music; Philosophy; Science; +...

This is a list of Belgian television related events from 1994.

== Events ==
- Unknown - Bianca Boets wins the sixth season of VTM Soundmixshow, performing as Andrea McArdle.

== Television shows ==
=== 1980s ===
- VTM Soundmixshow (1989-1995, 1997-2000)

=== 1990s ===
- Jambers
- Samson en Gert (1990–present)
- Familie (1991–present)
- Wittekerke (1993-2008)

== Ending this year ==
- R.I.P. (1992–1994)

== Networks and services ==
=== Conversions and rebrandings ===
Old network name	New network name	Type	Conversion Date	Notes	Source
Arte/21 & Sports 21	RTBF 21	Cable and satellite	Unknown		
