= 2007 in Belgian television =

This is a list of Belgian television related events from 2007.

== Events ==
- 9 March – Basketball player Pieter Loridon and his partner Daisy Croes win the second season of Sterren op de Dansvloer
- 10 May – Sister singing trio Triple E win the first season of Supertalent in Vlaanderen
- 25 May – Dean Delannoit wins the third season of Idool
- 4 June – Diana Ferrante wins the sixth and final season of Big Brother

== Television shows ==
=== 1990s ===
- Samson en Gert (1990–present)
- Familie (1991–present)
- Wittekerke (1993–2008)
- Thuis (1995–present)

=== 2000s ===
- Idool (2003–2011)
- X Factor (2005–2008)
- Mega Mindy (2006–present)
- Sterren op de Dansvloer (2006–2013)

== Ending this year ==
- Big Brother (2000–2007)
- Wizzy & Woppy (1999–2007)

== Networks and services ==
=== Launches ===
Network	Type	Launch date	Notes	Source
La Trois	Cable and satellite	30 November		

=== Conversions and rebrandings ===
Old network name	New network name	Type	Conversion Date	Notes	Source
La Quarte	Videoclick	Cable and satellite	3 April		

== See also ==
- 2007 in Belgium
