= 2011 in Belgian television =

This is a list of Belgian television related events from 2011.

== Events ==
- 12 February - Witloof Bay are selected to represent Belgium at the 2011 Eurovision Song Contest with their song "With Love Baby". They are selected to be the fifty-third Belgian Eurovision entry during Eurosong held at the Palais des Congrès in Liège.
- 20 May - Kevin Kayirangwa wins the fourth and final season of Idool

== Debuts ==
- 25 November - The Voice van Vlaanderen (2011–present)
- 5 December - ROX (2011–present)

== Television shows ==
=== 1990s ===
- Samson en Gert (1990–present)
- Familie (1991–present)
- Thuis (1995–present)

=== 2000s ===
- Mega Mindy (2006–present)
- Sterren op de Dansvloer (2006–2013)

== Ending this year ==
- Idool (2003–2011)

== Networks and services ==
=== Launches ===
Network	Type	Launch date	Notes	Source
Nickelodeon	Cable and satellite	4 October		

== See also ==
- 2011 in Belgium
