= Delannoit =

Delannoit may refer to:

- Cyrille Delannoit (1926-1998) (also written Cyriel Delannoit), Belgian boxer
- Dean Delannoit (born 1989), Belgian singer, winner of Idool 2007, member of Belgian Flemish boyband 3M8S
