= 2006 in Belgian television =

This is a list of Belgian television related events from 2006.

== Events ==
- 19 February - Kate Ryan is selected to represent Belgium at the 2006 Eurovision Song Contest with her song "Je t'adore". She is selected to be the forty-eighth Belgian Eurovision entry during Eurosong held at the VRT Studios in Schelle.
- 3 March - The 2001 Miss Belgium Dina Tersago and her partner Wim Gevaert win the first season of Sterren op de Dansvloer.
- 29 May - Kirsten Janssens wins the fifth season of Big Brother.
- 28 December - Star Academy 4th-place finisher Pim Symoens wins the second season of Big Brother VIPs.

== Debuts ==
- 13 January - Sterren op de Dansvloer (2006–2013)
- 26 November - Mega Mindy (2006–present)

== Television shows ==
=== 1990s ===
- Samson en Gert (1990–present)
- Familie (1991–present)
- Wittekerke (1993-2008)
- Thuis (1995–present)
- Wizzy & Woppy (1999-2007)

=== 2000s ===
- Big Brother (2000-2007)
- Idool (2003-2011)
- X Factor (2005-2008)

== Networks and services ==
=== Launches ===
Network	Type	Launch date	Notes	Source
Al Jazeera English	Cable and satellite	15 November		

=== Conversions and rebrandings ===
Old network name	New network name	Type	Conversion Date	Notes	Source
AB5	La Quarte	Cable and satellite	Unknown		

== See also ==
- 2006 in Belgium
