= 2003 in Belgian television =

This is a list of Belgian television related events from 2003.

== Events ==
- 3 January - The Belgian version of Pop Idol debuts on VTM.
- 9 May - Peter Evrard wins the first season of Idool.
- 16 May - Release date of Peter Evrard's debut single, "For You".
- 20 September - Heidi Zutterman, who finished 5th in the third season of Big Brother wins Big Brother All-Stars.
- 14 December - Kristof van Camp wins the fourth season of Big Brother.

== Debuts ==
- 3 January - Idool (2003-2011)

== Television shows ==
=== 1990s ===
- Samson en Gert (1990–present)
- Familie (1991–present)
- Wittekerke (1993-2008)
- Thuis (1995–present)
- Wizzy & Woppy (1999-2007)

=== 2000s ===
- Big Brother (2000-2007)

== Ending this year ==
- Big & Betsy (2000-2003)

== Networks and services ==
=== Launches ===
Network	Type	Launch date	Notes	Source
Disney Channel France	Cable television	31 March		
Nickelodeon	Cable and satellite	1 April		
ESPN Classic	Cable television	December		

=== Conversions and rebrandings ===
Old network name	New network name	Type	Conversion Date	Notes	Source
Kaanal2	KAANALTWEE	Cable and satellite	Unknown		

== See also ==
- 2003 in Belgium
