= 2005 in Belgian television =

This is a list of Belgian television related events from 2005.

== Events ==
- 20 March - Nuno Resende is selected to represent Belgium at the 2005 Eurovision Song Contest with his song "Le Grand Soir". He is selected to be the forty-seventh Belgian Eurovision entry during Eurosong held at the RTBF Studios in Brussels.
- 19 June - Katerine Avgoustakis wins the first season of the Flemish version of Star Academy.
- Unknown - Launch of the Belgian version of The X Factor.
- 11 December - Udo Mechels wins the first season of X Factor.

== Debuts ==
- Unknown - X Factor (2005-2008)

== Television shows ==
=== 1990s ===
- Samson en Gert (1990–present)
- Familie (1991–present)
- Wittekerke (1993-2008)
- Thuis (1995–present)
- Wizzy & Woppy (1999-2007)

=== 2000s ===
- Big Brother (2000-2007)
- Idool (2003-2011)

== Networks and services ==
=== Launches ===
Network	Type	Launch date	Notes	Source
TMF Pure; TMF NL; TMF Party	Cable and satellite	1 May		
TV Oranje	Cable and satellite	5 October		

== See also ==
- 2005 in Belgium
