= Ray Verhaeghe =

Belgian actor (born 1926)

- Born: Raymond Verhaeghe; March 19, 1926 (age 100); Torhout, Belgium
- Occupation: Actor
- Years active: 1957–present
- Known for: Familie (1992–present)
- Spouse: Diana Sanders (m. 1955; died 2005)
- Children: 4

Ray Verhaeghe (born 19 March 1926) is a Belgian actor, known for the role as grandpa Albert Thielens, in the Belgium longest soap-opera Familie since 1991 until today.

== Life and education ==
Verhaeghe was born on 19 March 1926 in Torhout, Belgium, as Raymond Vergaeghe. He completed his primary education in Torhout, followed by full classical humanities studies in Latin and Greek. He then pursued training in Word Recitation and Acting at the Municipal Music Conservatory in Bruges, continuing his education at the Royal Conservatory of Ghent. Verhaeghe later joined the Studio of the National Theatre in Antwerp, where he graduated in 1956, despite a 21-month interruption in his studies due to military service.

== Career ==
As an actor, Ray remains active in the performing arts and has appeared in numerous stage productions and television series. From 1956 to 1991, he held a permanent position as an actor at the Royal Dutch Theatre in Antwerp. Following his tenure there, he continued his career, focusing primarily on television. He is best known to the general public for his role as grandpa Albert Thielens in the long-running soap opera Familie, which was considered the longest soap opera in Belgium with almost 7549 episodes in until now in 2025. He and actress Annie Geeraerts are the oldest soap couple in the world, both at the age of 99 year.

== Personal life ==
In 1955, Verhaeghe married Diana Sanders from Sint-Michiels, near Bruges. The couple had four children. Diana worked as a secondary school home economics teacher in Waregem before leaving her position after seven years to dedicate herself fully to raising their family. She died following heart surgery in 2005.

He turned 100 on March 19, 2026.

== Filmography ==
Movies and TV Show
Year	Title	Role
1992–present	Familie	Albert Thielens
1993	Bompa	Bankdirector
1993	Postbus X	
1990	Commissaris Roos	Coenen
1980	De Collega's	Onderzoeksrechter
1979	Die Nacht mit Chandler	Traveler
1977	Rubens, schilder en diplomaat	Bishop
1976	Pallieter	
1974	The Conscript	Notaris
1968	I Love You, I Love You	
1966–1967	Axel Nort	Ned
1966	Johan en de Alverman	Lodder
1967	Midas	
1962	Het Rijk van koning Sim	Pelegrin
1957	Muiterij op de Caine	Matroos
