= Jet Naessens =

Belgian actress and director (1915–2010)

- Born: 4 September 1915; Brecon, Powys, Wales
- Died: 25 June 2010 (aged 94); Antwerp, Flanders, Belgium
- Education: Koninklijk Conservatorium Antwerpen
- Occupations: actress and director
- Years active: 1937–1978
- Employer(s): Royal Dutch Theatre, Koninklijk Conservatorium Antwerpen
- Notable work: The Legend of Doom House (1971); Driekoningenavond (1972)

Jet Violet Naessens (4 September 1915 – 25 June 2010) was a Belgian actress and director known for her work on stage and in Flemish cinema. She is most known for the film Driekoningenavond (1972).

== Biography ==
Naessens was born in Brecon, Powys, Wales in 1915, where her Belgian parents had fled to during World War I.

Naessens studied Theatre Arts at the Koninklijk Conservatorium Antwerpen (Royal Conservatoire Antwerp). After graduating, she began her acting career on stage at the Royal Dutch Theatre.

Naessensreturned to the Royal Conservatoire later in her career, teaching acting between 1959 and 1975. Her students included Belgian stars Sien Eggers, Herbert Flack, Marilou Mermans, and Simonne Peeters.

Naessens is most known for her work in the film Driekoningenavond (1972) and also starred as Eleonora in The Legend of Doom House (1971). She directed a Dutch language adaption of William Shakespeare's A Midsummer Night's Dream with Luc Phillips in 1970, having played Titania earlier in her career. She retired in 1978.

A booklet about Naeseens life was published in 2005 by her former student and colleague Toon Brouwers. It was titled Jet Naessens: De Charme op het Toneel (Jet Naessens: The Charm on Stage).

Naessens married Belgian actor Jos Gevers. She died in Antwerp, Flanders, Belgium, in 2010, aged 94.
