= 2004 in Belgian television =

This is a list of Belgian television related events from 2004.

== Events ==
- 15 February - Xandee is selected to represent Belgium at the 2004 Eurovision Song Contest with her song "1 Life". She is selected to be the forty-sixth Belgian Eurovision entry during Eurosong held at the VRT Studios in Schelle.
- 12 December - Joeri Fransen wins the second season of Idool. His debut single, "Ya 'Bout to Find Out" reaches number one in the Ultratop 50 two weeks later.

== Television shows ==
=== 1990s ===
- Samson en Gert (1990–present)
- Familie (1991–present)
- Wittekerke (1993-2008)
- Thuis (1995–present)
- Wizzy & Woppy (1999-2007)

=== 2000s ===
- Big Brother (2000-2007)
- Idool (2003-2011)

== Networks and services ==
=== Launches ===
Network	Type	Launch date	Notes	Source
RTL Plug	Cable television	13 February		
MTV	Cable television	16 February		
Be 1	Cable and satellite	29 October		

== Deaths ==
Date	Name	Age	Cinematic Credibility
11 February	Ugo Prinsen	65	Belgian actor

== See also ==
- 2004 in Belgium
