= Rock Werchter 2007 =

Rock Werchter 2007 was a festival that ran from Thursday, 28 June 2007 until Sunday, 1 July 2007 at the Rock Werchter site in the Belgian village of Werchter.

== Complete line-up ==
Thursday (28 June)

Mika was scheduled to perform at the Pyramid Marquee on this day. However, he was replaced by Milow, a local singer.

Main Stage	Pyramid Marquee
17:00–17:40 · Billy Talent (CAN); 18:05–18:55 · Zornik (BEL); 19:25–20:25 · My Chemical Romance (US); 21:00–22:00 · Marilyn Manson (US); 22:35–23:50 · Björk (ISL); 00:30–02:00 · Muse (UK)	17:00–17:45 · Milow (BEL); 18:10–19:00 · Air Traffic (UK); 19:35–20:45 · Air (FRA); 21:20–22:10 · Rufus Wainwright (CAN/US); 22:45–00:15 · Beastie Boys (US); 00:25–01:40 · Dr. Lektroluv (BEL)

Friday (29 June)

Main Stage	Pyramid Marquee
12:30–13:15 · The Van Jets (BEL); 13:40–14:25 · Enter Shikari (UK); 14:55–15:55 · Kings of Leon (US); 16:25–17:25 · Kaiser Chiefs (UK); 18:00–19:00 · Bloc Party (UK); 19:35–20:35 · Queens of the Stone Age (US); 21:10–22:20 · Arctic Monkeys (UK); 23:00–00:30 · Pearl Jam (US)	13:00–13:50 · Jason Mraz (US); 14:10–15:00 · Oi Va Voi (UK); 15:20–16:20 · Joan as Police Woman (US); 16:45–17:45 · Sioen (BEL); 18:15–19:15 · Lily Allen (UK); 19:50–20:50 · Admiral Freebee (BEL); 21:25–22:25 · Satellite Party (US); 23:00–00:15 · Gabriel Ríos (PUR/BEL)

Saturday (30 June)

Main Stage	Pyramid Marquee
12:30–13:15 · Heideroosjes (NED); 13:45–14:35 · Razorlight (UK); 15:05–16:05 · Amy Winehouse (UK); 16:40–17:40 · Snow Patrol (UK); 18:15–19:15 · The White Stripes (US); 19:55–21:10 · Peter Gabriel (UK); 21:50–22:50 · Keane (UK); 23:30–01:00 · The Chemical Brothers (UK)	12:30–13:15 · The Bravery (US); 13:45–14:30 · The Hold Steady (US); 15:00–15:50 · Blonde Redhead (US); 16:20–17:20 · Klaxons (UK); 17:55–18:55 · Goose (BEL); 19:30–20:45 · Arno (BEL); 21:20–22:35 · The Good, the Bad & the Queen (UK); 23:10–00:25 · LCD Soundsystem (US)

Sunday (1 July)

Main Stage	Pyramid Marquee
13:00–13:50 · !!! (US); 14:20–15:10 · Mastodon (US); 15:45–16:45 · The Kooks (UK); 17:20–18:20 · Interpol (US); 18:55–19:55 · Incubus (US); 21:00–23:20 · Metallica (US); 00:00–01:15 · Faithless (UK)	12:50–13:35 · Stijn (BEL); 14:05–14:55 · Cold War Kids (US); 15:25–16:15 · Maxïmo Park (UK); 16:45–17:45 · John Legend (US); 18:20–19:20 · Frank Black (US); 19:55–20:55 · Damien Rice (IRL); 21:30–22:45 · The Australian Pink Floyd Show (AUS); 23:30–00:40 · Tori Amos (US)
