= Rock Werchter 2010 =

Rock Werchter 2010 ran from 1 July until 4 July 2010 at the Rock Werchter site in the Belgian village of Werchter.

== Line-up ==
=== Day 1: Thursday 1 July ===
| Main Stage | Pyramid Marquee |
|---|---|
| Faithless (UK); Muse (UK); Stereophonics (UK); Phoenix (FRA); Skunk Anansie (UK); De Jeugd van Tegenwoordig (NED) | Crookers (ITA); The Bloody Beetroots Death Crew 77 (ITA); La Roux (UK); The XX (UK); Midlake (USA); Kyteman's HipHop Orchestra (NED) |

=== Day 2: Friday 2 July ===
| Main Stage | Pyramid Marquee |
|---|---|
| Green Day (USA); Editors (UK); Thirty Seconds to Mars (USA); Paramore (USA); Rise Against (USA); Coheed and Cambria (USA); Customs (BEL) | LCD Soundsystem (USA); The Specials (UK); Jack Johnson (USA); Corinne Bailey Rae (UK); The Gaslight Anthem (USA); The Morning Benders (USA); Balthazar (BEL) |

=== Day 3: Saturday 3 July ===
| Main Stage | Pyramid Marquee |
|---|---|
| Rammstein (GER); P!nk (USA); The Ting Tings (UK); Gossip (USA); Channel Zero (BEL); Das Pop (BEL); Taylor Hawkins & The Coattail Riders (USA) | Booka Shade (GER); Empire of the Sun (AUS); Florence and the Machine (UK); Porcupine Tree (UK); Yeasayer (USA); The Temper Trap (AUS); Delphic (UK) |

=== Day 4: Sunday 4 July ===
| Main Stage | Pyramid Marquee |
|---|---|
| Pearl Jam (USA); Arcade Fire (CAN); Them Crooked Vultures (USA); Vampire Weekend (USA); Alice in Chains (USA); The Black Keys (USA); The Van Jets (BEL) | Vitalic (FRA); The Black Box Revelation (BEL); Absynthe Minded (BEL); Dirty Projectors (USA); Gomez (UK); Shameboy (BEL); Sweet Coffee (BEL) |
