= 3M8S =

Belgian boyband (2012–2014)

- Origin: Belgium
- Genres: Pop
- Years active: 2012–2014
- Past members: Dean Delannoit; Kevin Kayirangwa; Dennis De Neyer

3M8S (pronounced three mates) was a Flemish Belgian boyband in the early 2010s made up of Dean Delannoit, Kevin Kayirangwa and Dennis De Neyer, all former contestants on Belgian Idool.

The band was formed in May 2012 when the three members decided to join forces in a band with each one also continuing their solo careers whenever possible. The band usually sings English language. The name was chosen on the basis of a competition by the youth magazine JOEPIE.

The band has been relatively successful and took part in the preliminary rounds for preliminary rounds of "Eurosong 2014" to try to represent Belgium in 2014 Eurovision Song Contest, and was eliminated in the early rounds of the selection. Later the boy band announced that it would stop so that members would focus on their solo career.

== Members ==
3M8S members are:

- Dean Delannoit, born in Geraardsbergen on 27 January 1989 is the winner of Idool 2007 in season 3 of the Belgian contest. "So Many Ways", his winning single in 2007 reached to number 2 on Ultratop, the official Belgian Singles Chart. The same titled album topped the Albums Chart. Other charting hits include "We Don't Belong", "You" and a number of hits in Ultratip bubbling under charts.
- Kevin Kayirangwa, born 11 February 1991 is the winner of Idool 2011 in season 3 of the Belgian contest. His winning song "She's Got Moves" in addition to a number of minor hits. His album Thank You reached #2 in the Belgian Albums Chart.
- Dennis De Neyer, who finished 5th-6th overall in Idool 2011, season 4 of the contest. "She's Not Coming Back" remains his sole minor hit.

== Discography ==
=== Albums ===
Year	Album	Peak positions	Notes
Year	Album	BEL (Vl)	Notes
2012	Growing Up in Public	121	Tracklist: 1. "(Before) Summer's Gone" (2:59); 2. "Iris" (4:19); 3. "Back in September (Back to Skool)" (2:56); 4. "Lovestoned" (2:50); 5. "Real Love" (3:07); 6. "Without You" (3:17); 7. "She Moved On" (3:03); 8. "Drops of Jupiter" (4:26); 9. "Just You and I" (3:14); 10. "Mad World" (3:03); 11. "(Before) Summer's Gone" [Acoustic] (3:01); 12. "Iris" [Acoustic] (3:54); 13. "Back in September (Back to Skool)" [Acoustic] (2:54); 14. "Lovestoned" (Acoustic) (2:48); 15. (Booklet)

=== Singles ===
Year	Single	Peak positions	Album
Year	Single	BEL (Vl)	Album
2012	"(Before) Summer's Gone"	19	Growing Up in Public
2012	"Back in September (Back to Skool)"	20	Growing Up in Public
2012	"LoveStoned"	21	Growing Up in Public
2013	"Don't You Worry Child"	30	Non-album release
2013	"My Island"	22	TBA
2013	"High Hopes"	10	TBA
