= Rock Werchter =

Music festival in Werchter, Belgium

Coordinates: 50°58′5″N 4°41′3″E

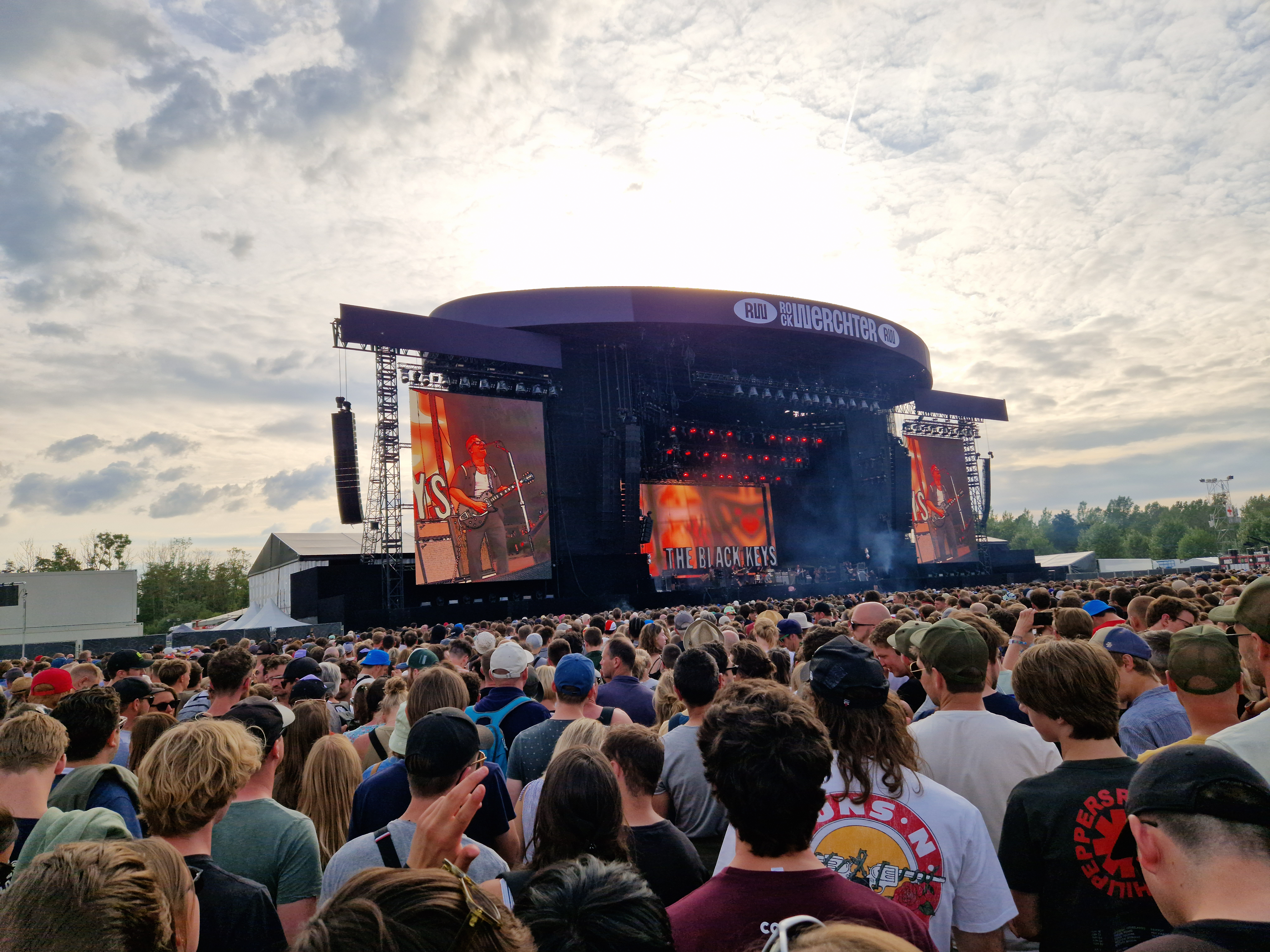
- The Rock Werchter main stage in 2023
- Genre: Alternative rock, rock, indie rock, pop, hip hop, heavy metal, electronic music, dance music
- Dates: First weekend in July
- Locations: Werchter Festivalpark, Werchter, Belgium
- Years active: 1974 – present
- Founders: Herman Schueremans
- Attendance: 352.000
- Capacity: 88.000
- Website: Festival Website

Rock Werchter is an annual music festival held in the village of Werchter, near Leuven, Belgium, since 1976 and is a large sized rock music festival. The 2003, 2005, 2006, 2007, 2012 and 2014 festivals received the Arthur award for best festival in the world at the International Live Music Conference (ILMC). It can host 88,000 guests daily, of which 67,500 combine all four days, to add up to a total maximum of 149,500 different attendees.

The festival started in 1974 as a one-day event with performances from Banzai and Kandahar, but over the years it has evolved to become one of Belgium's largest music festivals. Originally it was a double-festival, called "Torhout-Werchter", with two festival areas at different sites in Belgium: one in Werchter and one in Torhout. In 1999, the festival dropped the Torhout site and since then has taken place only in Werchter. Since 2003 Werchter has been a 4-day festival, as it was sold by owner Herman Schueremans to American organizers Live Nation. Schueremans however remains the main organizer of the event. The festival is organized every first weekend of the summer vacation in Belgium (last weekend of June or the first of July).

In recent years, there has been controversy about rising ticket prices. Because of this, Schueremans was heckled during an appearance on HUMO's Pop Poll, a Belgian alternative award show. At €200 for four days (€18 extra to include camping or €25 for xl-camping) in 2012, it was still considered by some a relatively inexpensive music festival.

The camping sites officially open at 8am on the first day of the festival, but because of guests arriving early and camping on the street, the organizers have traditionally been forced to open the camping sites early - sometimes more than 24 hours in advance. The campsites are located along the three main entrance roads into Werchter (from Haacht, Aarschot and Leuven), most of them within one kilometer of the festival site, but some are located as far as 3 kilometers away. In 2011, for the first time, XL camping tickets were available, allowing festival goers to arrive and camp from 4pm on the Wednesday before the festival.

Until the 1990s, the festival attracted mostly Flemish festival goers, but in recent years it has become more and more international with an especially large influx of Dutch, French, Walloon and British visitors, with notable Australian, South African and other contingents. Belgians alternatively go to the Pukkelpop and Dour festivals.

All graphics of Rock Werchter, including the posters, were designed by Tom Hautekiet, who died in April 2020.

== History ==
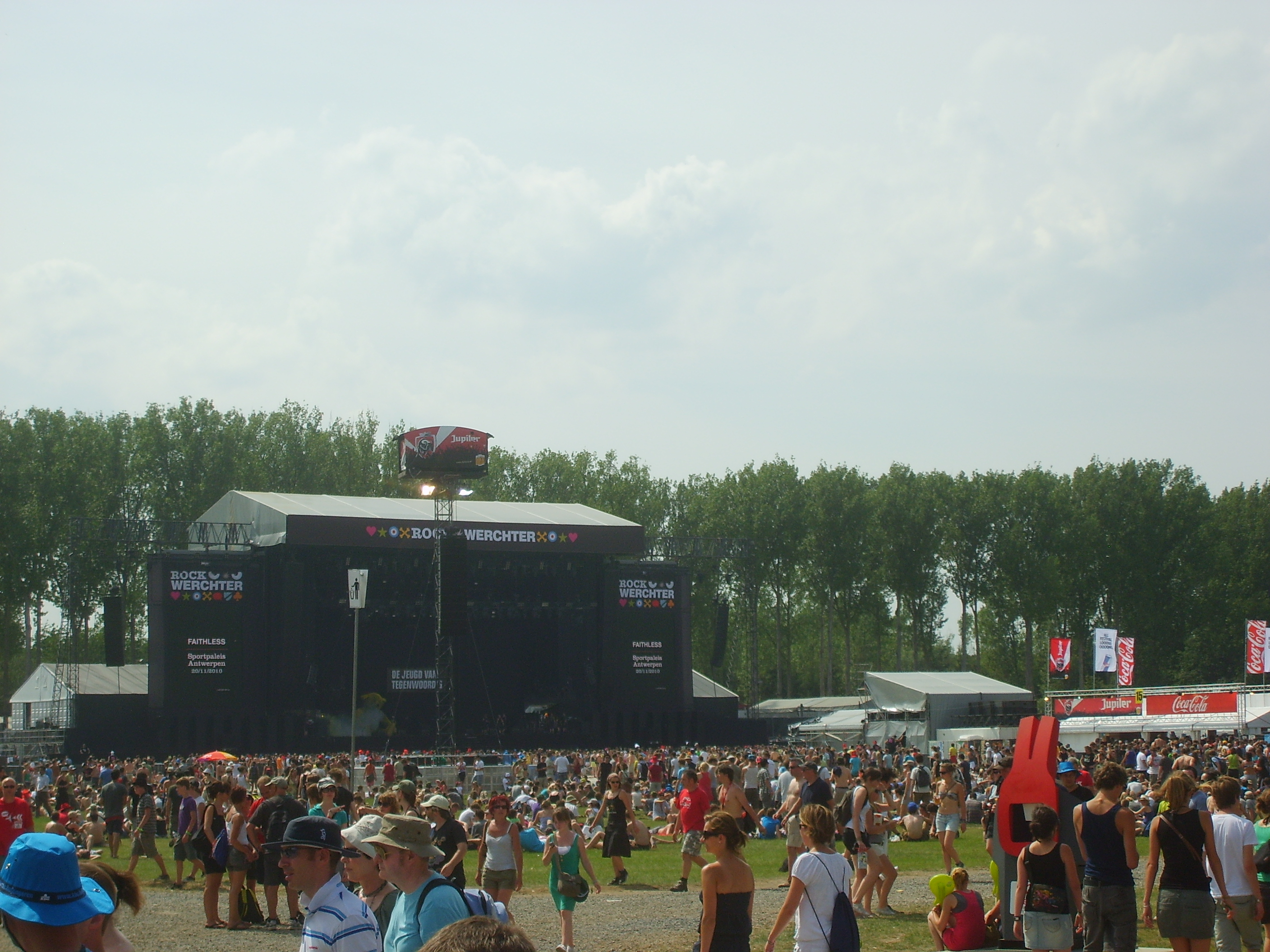
Rock Werchter 2010

The festival started off as a single-day, two-city event, then named "Torhout-Werchter" festival; becoming a two-day, two-city festival in 1996; a 3-day, single-city festival named "Rock Werchter" in 1999; and a 4-day festival since 2003.

Before 1995, when the festival was still a double-festival, it had one stage with 8 or 9 bands performing twice, once in Torhout and once in Werchter. Since 1995 the Main stage was accompanied by a second stage. This stage was an open-air stage until 1999 when it was made a tent named 'Pyramid Marquee', with a capacity of 6,000 people. The performers in Pyramid Marquee are usually lesser-known or aimed at a specific audience. Sometimes groups that do well in Pyramid Marquee are expected to have a hard time taking the step to the Main stage, especially when they are seen as an act needing intimate, smaller venues. Sigur Rós is the most famous example of this, when they were programmed on Main Stage in 2008 after their 2006 performance in Pyramid Marquee, but they managed the transition and were hailed as one of the best performances of the festival.

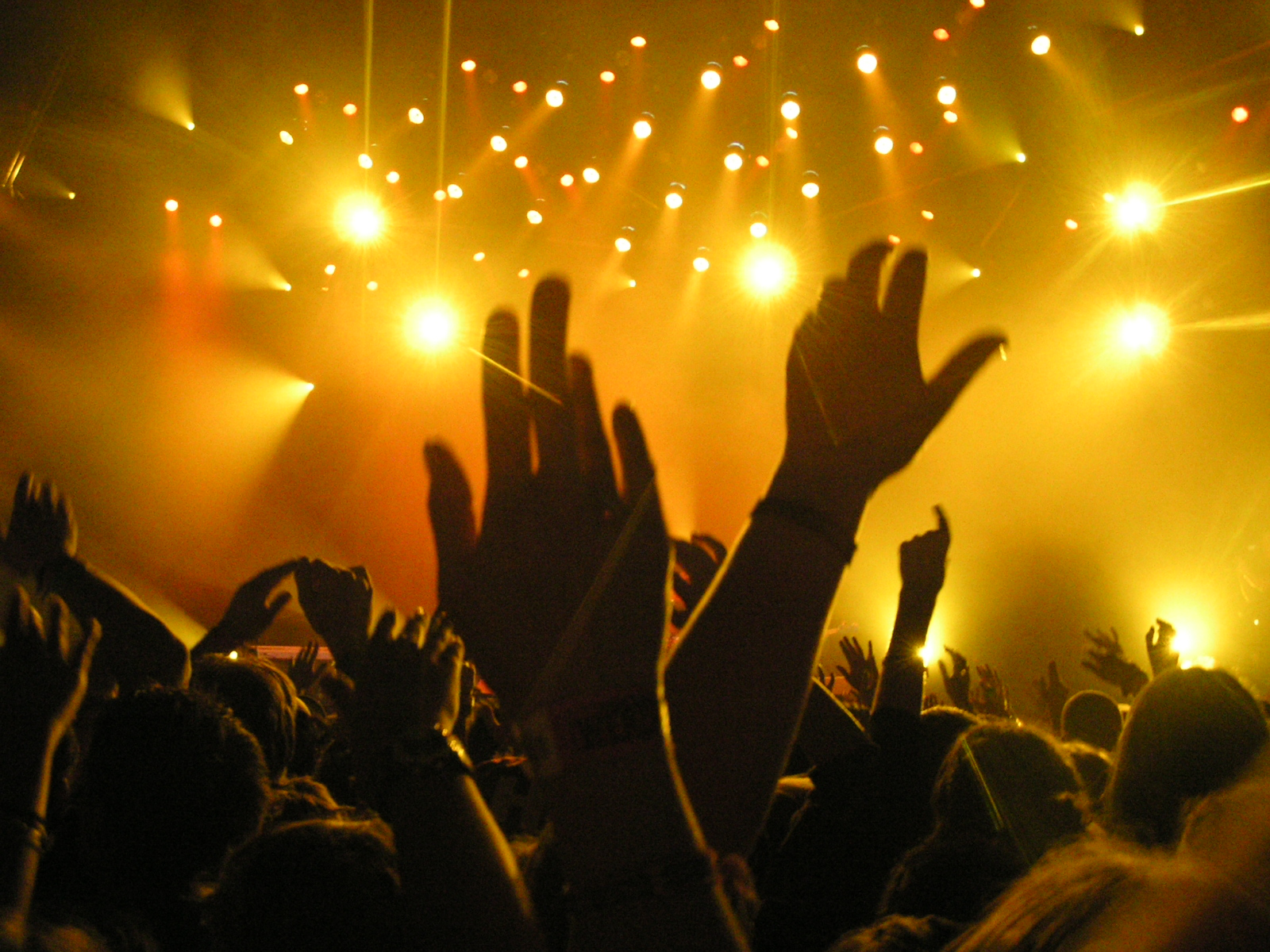
Inside Pyramid Marquee

In 2012, a new third stage was added, called "The Barn" which is translated to "De Schuur" in Dutch, a reference to the nickname of organiser Herman Schueremans. The new tent – with a capacity of 10,000 – is meant for the more intimate concerts on Rock Werchter, like Beirut in 2012.

In 2013, Pyramid Marquee was replaced by a new bigger tent, named "KluB C".

The bands presented at Rock Werchter are traditionally a balanced mix of well known artists, popular crowd-pleasing acts and local Belgian acts. Belgian band Deus in 2008 was the first local band to close the Main Stage on the last day for several years. The days usually start around noon and end around 1am. At the end of the last day there is a big fireworks show.

== Satellite festivals ==
=== TW Classic ===
Since 2002, the organizers created TW Classic as a tribute to the early days of Rock Werchter. TW Classic ('TW', as in Torhout-Werchter, is the traditional abbreviation of the festival) is a one day/one stage festival held one week after the main event. It usually programs veteran acts like Bruce Springsteen, Phil Collins, The Police, Depeche Mode or Simple Minds, supplemented with younger mainstream Belgian acts. In 2014, The Rolling Stones headlined TW Classic as one of their few festival concerts of 2014. In 2015, Robbie Williams headlined with his Let Me Entertain You Tour, and in 2016 Bruce Springsteen returned to the stage.

=== Werchter Boutique ===
This new festival was created in 2008 and organised one week after the main festival. It mainly aims at complete families with acts for children, teenagers as well as adults. The main acts in 2008 were Tokio Hotel, Santana and Doe Maar. In 2009 was centered on a concert of Madonna during her Sticky & Sweet Tour. In all, 68,000 tickets were sold for the concert, making it a one-day sell-out event. In 2010 Prince made one of his only 3 stops in Europe as the headliner. In 2012, it was headlined by metal band Metallica, supported by various heavy metal and rock bands like Gojira, Mastodon and Soundgarden. Muse performed there during their 2013 Unsustainable Tour, with Belgian bands Balthazar and SX as support. In 2016, Rihanna was planned to headline the event, but a shortage of police forces on the planned day because of the Belgian national holiday led to the 2016 event being cancelled, with Rihanna rescheduled to appear a month later at Pukkelpop.

=== Main Square Festival ===
Since 2008, the organizers created a small version of Rock Werchter on the central square of Arras, in northern France. It is held on the same dates as Rock Werchter, with a similar line-up - which is an advantage for organisers as they can offer artists two shows instead of one. Arras was chosen as a location because of its large historic central square and because of the lack of big rock festivals in France.

== Separate concerts ==
From 1980, there were concerts organized on the Werchter festival ground outside the concept of Rock (Torhout)/Werchter, TW Classic or Werchter Boutique. See Werchter festival ground.

== Festival by year ==
| Year | Dates | Guests per day (avg) | Main artists | Notes |
|---|---|---|---|---|
| 1977 | | 5,000 | Philip Catherine, Jan Akkerman, Kayak, Dr. Feelgood | |
| 1978 | | 6,000 | Talking Heads, Dr. Feelgood, Nick Lowe, Dave Edmunds & Rockpile | |
| 1979 | | 12,000 | Raymond van het Groenewoud, Talking Heads, Dire Straits, Rory Gallagher | |
| 1980 | | 18,000 | Kevin Ayers, Fischer-Z, The Specials, The Kinks | |
| 1981 | | 23,500 | Elvis Costello & the Attractions, The Cure, Robert Palmer, Dire Straits | The Cure, after being told to cut their set short by Robert Palmer's managers, play a 9-minute long rendition of "A Forest". |
| 1982 | | 37,500 | Allez Allez, U2, Steve Miller Band, Talking Heads, Jackson Browne | |
| 1983 | | 36,000 | Eurythmics, Simple Minds, U2, Peter Gabriel, Van Morrison | |
| 1984 | | 55,000 | Chris Rea, John Hiatt, Joe Jackson, Simple Minds, Lou Reed | Schueremans and De Meyer created StageCo Staging Company. All audio and video equipments were dismantled at Torhout and transported to Werchter to be built up for the Werchter leg of the festival. This had to be done in 10 hours. |
| 1985 | | 63,000 | Ramones, Lloyd Cole and the Commotions, R.E.M., Depeche Mode, U2, Joe Cocker | |
| 1986 | | 60,000 | Simply Red, Talk Talk, UB40, Elvis Costello & the Attractions, Simple Minds | Ticket price was Bfr 850, which is €21 nowadays. |
| 1987 | | 60,000 | Iggy Pop, Echo & the Bunnymen, The Pretenders, Eurythmics, Peter Gabriel | |
| 1988 | | 60,000 | Ziggy Marley & the Melody Makers, Los Lobos, John Hiatt, INXS, Bryan Adams, Sting | Bryan Adams records his live album Live! Live! Live! while it "rained in torrents." |
| 1989 | | 50,000 | Texas, Pixies, Tanita Tikaram, Nick Cave and the Bad Seeds, The Robert Cray Band, Elvis Costello, R.E.M., Joe Jackson, Lou Reed | Elvis Costello is performing solo, yet he manages to overwhelm the crowd |
| 1990 | | 60,000 | Mano Negra, De La Soul, The Jeff Healey Band, Lenny Kravitz, Ry Cooder / David Lindley, Wendy and Lisa, Sinéad O'Connor, Midnight Oil, Bob Dylan, The Cure | |
| 1991 | | 50,500 | The Scene, Dave Stewart, Deee-Lite, Happy Mondays, Bonnie Raitt, Pixies, Iggy Pop, Sting, Paul Simon | In Torhout the crowd spontaneously started throwing empty bottles in the air during Sting's song 'Message in a Bottle', soon filling the skies with bottlework. The same happened in Werchter the next day, ending with bottles hitting people's heads and resulting in injuries. This incident marked the beginning of the prohibition of visitors bringing their own drinks to the festival, a decision criticized and alleged to be for mere commercial purposes. |
| 1992 | | 60,000 | The Tragically Hip, Extreme, The Smashing Pumpkins, Crowded House, Lou Reed, Red Hot Chili Peppers, Bryan Adams, Luka Bloom | Kiedis shouted at the crowd: "If you love us, throw more mud!" A few seconds later the stage was transformed in a place best described as a mud fight arena. |
| 1993 | | 60,000 | Sonic Youth, The Levellers, The Black Crowes, Faith No More, Neil Young w/ Booker T. & the M.G.'s, Lenny Kravitz, Metallica, Guns N' Roses | |
| 1994 | | 50,500 | Tool, Clawfinger, Therapy?, Sepultura, Rage Against the Machine, Aerosmith, Peter Gabriel | A camping festival was held the night before the festival itself. dEUS and Tool performed on this stage. |
| 1995 | | 65,000 | Jeff Buckley, PJ Harvey, The Offspring, The Cure, The Cranberries, R.E.M. | Second stage added. |
| 1996 | | 50,000 | David Bowie, The Chemical Brothers, Afghan Wigs, Rage Against the Machine, Radiohead, Red Hot Chili Peppers, Björk, Pulp, Massive Attack, Foo Fighters, Neil Young & Crazy Horse | First time as a two-day festival. First time ever Radiohead played Paranoid Android. |
| 1997 | | 50,000 | David Bowie, Daft Punk, Supergrass, Live, Radiohead, Jamiroquai, The Smashing Pumpkins, Beck, Deus | |
| 1998 | | 20,000 | Sonic Youth, Eagle Eye Cherry, Garbage, Therapy?, Nick Cave and the Bad Seeds, Beastie Boys, Björk | |
| 1999 | 2–4 July | 51,500 | Pavement, Blur, Marilyn Manson, Bryan Adams, Metallica, Placebo, Robbie Williams, Faithless, Lenny Kravitz, R.E.M. | First time in Werchter only. First time as a three-day festival (shows started at 5pm on Friday). |
| 2000 | 30 June – 2 July | 55,000 | Nine Inch Nails, Oasis, Bush, A Perfect Circle, Counting Crows, The Cure, Eels, Paul Weller, Live, Hooverphonic, Manu Chao, Kelis, Suzanne Vega | |
| 2001 | 29 June – 1 July | 60,000 | Fun Lovin' Criminals, Sting, Beck, Placebo, PJ Harvey, Muse, Sigur Rós, Grandaddy, Faithless, Incubus | |
| 2002 | 28 – 30 June | 63,000 | Sonic Youth, The White Stripes, Red Hot Chili Peppers, Rammstein, Queens of the Stone Age, Faithless, Coldplay | |
| 2003 | 26 – 29 June | 70,000 | Radiohead, Björk, Massive Attack, Moby, Metallica, Queens of the Stone Age, R.E.M., Coldplay | First time as a four-day-festival Arthur award for Best festival in the world |
| 2004 | 1 – 4 July | 70,000 | The Cure, Metallica, KoЯn, Lenny Kravitz, Pixies, Muse, 2 Many DJs, Placebo, Moloko | Arthur award for Best festival in the world. Headliner David Bowie cancelled because of a shoulder nerve injury. 2 Many DJs were flown back from the UEFA Euro 2004 Final in Lisbon to replace him. |
| 2005 | 30 June – 3 July | 80,000 | New Order, The Chemical Brothers, Garbage, Green Day, Kraftwerk, Queens of the Stone Age, Snoop Dogg, Faithless, Rammstein, Foo Fighters, R.E.M. | |
| 2006 | 29 June – 2 July | 80,000 | Red Hot Chili Peppers, The Black Eyed Peas, The Who, Muse, Franz Ferdinand, Placebo, Deus, Depeche Mode | Arthur award for Best festival in the world |
| 2007 | 28 June – 1 July | 80,000 | Muse, Kaiser Chiefs, The White Stripes, Arctic Monkeys, Pearl Jam, The Chemical Brothers, Metallica, Queens of the Stone Age, Faithless | Arthur award for Best festival in the world. Pearl Jam finally played at the festival after cancellations in 1992 (Eddie Vedder's stress collapse) and 2000 (drama at Roskilde). |
| 2008 | 3 – 6 July | 80,000 | The Chemical Brothers, R.E.M., Moby, Neil Young, Radiohead, Sigur Rós, Deus, Beck, Kaiser Chiefs | The ILMC (who gives the Arthur Awards) changed their restrictions, a festival which has won 2 years in a row can not enter the next year. This change has been done in favour of the other festivals. |
| 2009 | 2 – 5 July | 80,000 | Coldplay, The Killers, Lady Gaga, Placebo, Metallica, Kings of Leon, Oasis, Bloc Party, Franz Ferdinand, Nine Inch Nails, Limp Bizkit | European Festival Award for Best line-up, artist's favourite festival and best promoter |
| 2010 | 1 – 4 July | 80,000 | Arcade Fire, Pearl Jam, Muse, Pink, Rammstein, Faithless, Green Day, Thirty Seconds to Mars, Them Crooked Vultures, Editors | |
| 2011 | 30 June – 3 July | 82,750 | Coldplay, Linkin Park, Kings of Leon, Iron Maiden, The Chemical Brothers, Arctic Monkeys, Queens of the Stone Age, Robyn, Black Eyed Peas | European Festival Award for Best line-up |
| 2012 | 28 June – 1 July | 85,000 | Red Hot Chili Peppers, The Cure, Garbage, Skrillex, Justice, Pearl Jam, Deadmau5, Mumford & Sons, Editors, Rise Against, Chase & Status, Snow Patrol | Third stage added, Arthur award for Best festival in the world |
| 2013 | 4 – 7 July | 85,000 | Depeche Mode, Blur, Rammstein, Green Day, Thirty Seconds to Mars, Kings of Leon, The National, Editors, Netsky, Nick Cave and the Bad Seeds, Volbeat | |
| 2014 | 3 – 6 July | 88,000 | Pearl Jam, Metallica, Arctic Monkeys, Kings of Leon, Pixies, The Black Keys, Placebo, Damon Albarn, Skrillex, Ellie Goulding | One of only two festival appearances by Pearl Jam in their exclusive 12-date 2014 European tour. |
| 2015 | 25–28 June | 88,000 | The Chemical Brothers, Faith No More, Mumford & Sons, Pharrell Williams, Lenny Kravitz, The Prodigy, Muse, Kasabian | |
| 2016 | 30 June – 3 July | TBD | Rammstein, Florence and the Machine, Paul McCartney, Ellie Goulding, Editors, Iggy Pop, Macklemore & Ryan Lewis | |
| 2017 | | | Foo Fighters, Radiohead, Linkin Park, System Of A Down, Kings of Leon, Arcade Fire, Alt-J, Blink 182, Imagine Dragons | |
| 2018 | 5-8 July | | Arctic Monkeys, Queens of the Stone Age, Pearl Jam, Gorillaz, The Killers, Nick Cave & The Bad Seeds, Jack White, Nine Inch Nails | First year with 4 stages |
| 2019 | | | Fleetwood Mac, Kylie Minogue, Tool, The Cure, Muse, Mumford & Sons, Florence and the Machine, Bring Me The Horizon, Pink | |
| 2022 | 30 June- 3 July | | Pearl Jam, The Kid LAROI, Metallica, Twenty One Pilots, Imagine Dragons, The Killers, Red Hot Chili Peppers, Polo G | |
| 2023 | 29 June- 2 July | | Red Hot Chili Peppers, Queens of the Stone Age, Arctic Monkeys, Muse, Lil Nas X, AURORA, Iggy Pop, Mumford and Sons, Liam Gallagher, Kasabian, The Black Keys, The Lumineers, The 1975, Stormzy, Fred Again | Stromae was the scheduled to perform as headliner but had to cancel due to mental health related issues. His performance was replaced by Mumford and Sons. |
| 2024 | 4-7 July | | Lenny Kravitz, Greta Van Fleet, Parkway Drive, Maneskin, Sum 41, Dua Lipa, Khruangbin, Foo Fighters, Royal Blood | |
| 2025 | 3-6 July | | Linkin Park, Deftones, Green Day, Simple Minds, Weezer, Sam Fender, Yungblud, Olivia Rodrigo, Noah Kahan | |
| 2026 | 2-5 July | | Mumford & Sons, The War On Drugs, The XX, Lewis Capaldi, Gorillaz, Twenty One Pilots, The Cure, Moby, A Perfect Circle | |

== See also ==
- List of historic rock festivals
