= 2002 in Belgian television =

This is a list of Belgian television related events from 2002.

== Events ==
- 17 February - Sergio & The Ladies are selected to represent Belgium at the 2002 Eurovision Song Contest with their song "Sister". They are selected to be the forty-fourth Belgian Eurovision entry during Eurosong held at the VRT Studios in Schelle.
- 15 December - Kelly Vandevenne wins season 3 of Big Brother.

== Television shows ==
=== 1990s ===
- Samson en Gert (1990–present)
- Familie (1991–present)
- Wittekerke (1993-2008)
- Thuis (1995–present)
- Wizzy & Woppy (1999-2007)

=== 2000s ===
- Big & Betsy (2000-2003)
- Big Brother (2000-2007)

== Ending this year ==
- Wie wordt multimiljonair? (1999-2002)

== Networks and services ==
=== Launches ===
Network	Type	Launch date	Notes	Source
AB4	Cable and satellite	28 October		
E!	Cable television	2 December		

== See also ==
- 2002 in Belgium
