= Annie Geeraerts =

Belgian actress (born 1926)

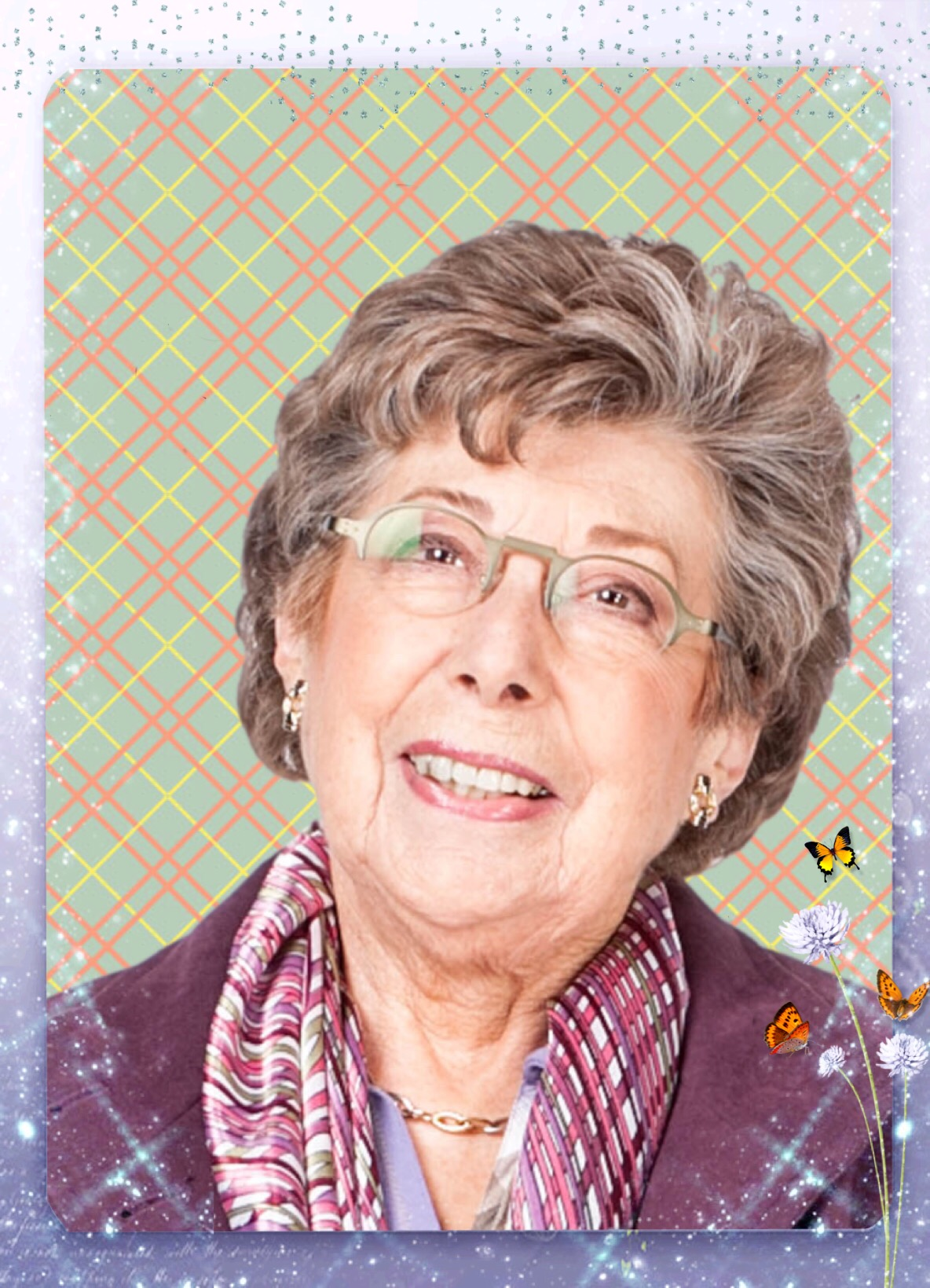
- Geeraerts in 2016
- Born: August 2, 1926 (age 100); Borgerhout, Flanders, Belgium
- Occupation: Actress
- Years active: 1960–present
- Known for: Familie (1991–present)
- Spouse: Paul (m. 2023; died 2025)
- Children: 1

Annie Geeraerts (born 2 August 1926) is a Belgian actress, known for her role as grandma Anna Dierckx in the Belgian longest running soap-opera Familie since 1991.

== Life and career ==
Geeraerts was born on 2 August 1926 in Borgerhout. She started her career in stage playing minor roles of different dramas and comedies in Flemish language. Between 1960 and 1990, Annie appeared in TV movies without any fame or name known for her performances. Then she appeared mostly in television series and soap operas like Bompa, Alfa Papa Tango, Misstoestanden, De Kotmadam and Commissaris Roos. In 1991 she gained fame in Belgium with the role of grandmother Anna Dierckx in the soap opera Familie, which was considered the longest soap opera in Belgium with almost 7549 episodes in until now in 2025. She and actor Ray Verhaeghe are the oldest soap couple in the world, both at the age of 100.

Annie was married to a man who was ten years older than her. They had a daughter named Annemie who works as a kindergarten teacher. Geeraerts said that Annemie's birth was difficult and she nearly died during the childbirth, so she and her husband decided not to have any more children after this incident. After the death of her husband Annie found love again with Paul, he died in 2025 at the age of 93. In 2024 Annie had an accident when she fell while working in her garden, leading to hospitalization. After this incident she decided to move to a serviced apartment in the Nieuw Zuid area, to be closer to her daughter.

She turned 100 on 2 August 2026.

== Filmography ==
Films and TV Shows
Year	Title	Role
1991–2025	Familie	Anna Dierckx
2023	De Kotmadam	Anna
2000	Misstoestanden	Moemoe Kiekeboe
1992	Kommissaris Roos	Bobonne
1992	Kiekeboe: Het witte bloed	Jozefien
1991	RIP	Aunt Rosette
1989–1990	Bompa	Helene Bompa
1990	Alfa Papa Tango	Flatbewoonster
1989	Vijgen na Kerstmis	Gaby
1967	Sneeuwwitje	Pieteko
1966	Op de kermis	Lieverdje
1960	Signal 1302	
