= 2000 in Belgian television =

This is a list of Belgian television related events from 2000.

== Events ==
- 18 February – Nathalie Sorce is selected to represent Belgium at the 2000 Eurovision Song Contest with her song "Envie de vivre". She is selected to be the forty-third Belgian Eurovision entry during Eurosong held at the RTBF Studios in Brussels.
- 15 May – A television documentary reveals evidence of Belgian involvement in the assassination of Patrice Lumumba, the first prime minister of the Democratic Republic of the Congo.
- 3 September – The Belgian version of Big Brother debuts on Kanaal Twee.
- 10 October – Ingrid Vervaeck wins the jackpot of BEF 20,000,000 in Wie wordt multimiljonair?.
- 17 December – The first season of Big Brother is won by Steven Spillebeen.
- Unknown – Kürt Rogiers takes over from Bart Kaëll as host of VTM Soundmixshow.
- Unknown – Sonny Oroir wins the eleventh season of VTM Soundmixshow, performing as Celine Dion.

== Debuts ==
- 2 April – Hopla (2000―2008)
- 3 September – Big Brother (2000–2007)
- 5 November – Big & Betsy (2000–2003)

== Television shows ==
=== 1990s ===
- Samson en Gert (1990–present)
- Familie (1991–present)
- Wittekerke (1993–2008)
- Thuis (1995–present)
- Wie wordt multimiljonair? (1999–2002)
- Wizzy & Woppy (1999–2007)

== Ending this year ==
- VTM Soundmixshow (1989–1995, 1997–2000)

== Networks and services ==
=== Launches ===
Network	Type	Launch date	Notes	Source
Vitaya	Cable and satellite	25 August		
