= Kevin Kayirangwa =

Belgian singer (born 1991)

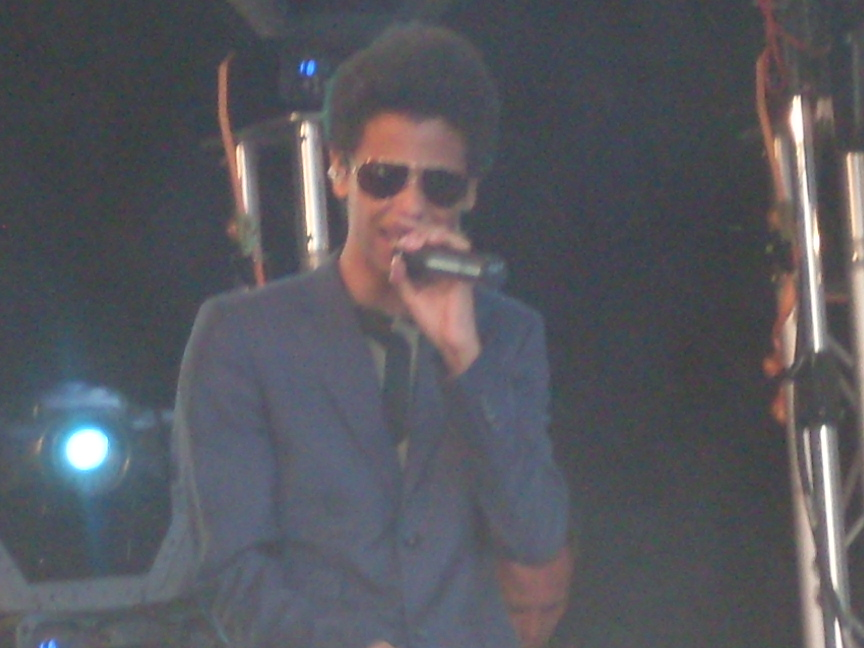
- Kayirangwa performing in 2011

Background information
- Born: 11 February 1991 (age 35)
- Origin: Arlon, Belgium
- Genres: Pop, R&B, Soul, Funk
- Instruments: Guitar, Vocals
- Years active: 2011–2013
- Label: Sony BMG

Kevin Kayirangwa (born 11 February 1991) also known as Kevin or Kevin K, is the winner of Idool 2011, in season 4 of the Belgian version of Pop Idol. His first album, Thank You, on Sony BMG released in 2011, reached No. 2 in the Ultratop Belgian Flemish Singles Charts.

In May 2012, he joined Dennis De Neyer, a co-contestant of Kevin in the same series and Dean Delannoit, an Idool 2007 season 3 winner to form the Belgian Flemish boyband 3M8S.

Kayirangwa is of Rwandan descent.

== Discography ==
=== Albums ===
Year	Album	Peak positions	Notes
Year	Album	BEL (Vl)	Notes
2011	Thank You	2	Tracklist: 1. "She's Got Moves" (3:19); 2. "Crashing" (3:23); 3. "Now or Never" (3:14); 4. "Don't Let Me Go" (3:30); 5. "I Won't Leave" (3:56); 6. "Forget You" (3:42); 7. "No Words Needed" (3:29); 8. "Done Deal" (3:24); 9. "Master Blaster" (3:11); 10. "Gimme Little Sign" (3:10)

=== Singles ===
Year	Single	Peak positions	Album
Year	Single	BEL (Vl)	Album
2011	"She's Got Moves"	2	Thank You
2011	"Forget You"	30	Thank You
2011	"Crashing"	11 (Ultratip*)	Thank You
2011	"Done Deal"	16 (Ultratip*)	Thank You

*Did not appear in the official Belgian Ultratop 50 charts, but rather in the bubbling under Ultratip charts.

Featured in

Year	Single	Peak positions	Album
Year	Single	BEL (Vl)	Album
2013	""Only 1" (Ian Prada & Gregoir Cruz feat. 2Stars & Kevin K.)	78 (Ultratip*)	

Other singles

- 2011: "More to Me" (as part of the Idool 2011 Finalists collective) (peaked at No. 1 in Belgian Ultratop)

Preceded by Dean Delannoit	Idool; Winner; Season 4 (2011)	Succeeded by
