= Idool 2011 =

- Season 2011
- Hosted by: Koen Wauters, Kris Wauters
- Judges: Jean Blaute; Sylvia Van Driesche; Wouter Van Belle; Koen Buyse
- Winner: Kevin Kayirangwa
- Runner-up: Kato Callebaut

Release
- Original network: VTM
- Original release: February 2 – May 20, 2011

Season chronology
- ← Previous; Idool 2007

Idool 2011 is the fourth season of Idool. A talent show based on the British talent show Pop Idol. It premiered on February 2, 2011. after an absence for four years.

The brothers Koen Wauters and Kris Wauters returned as a host for the fourth time while of the former judges only Jean Blaunt remained at the panel.

Prior to the kick-off of the broadcast an internet viewer had a chance to receive an online wildcard as the most voted online applicant. Saartje D'haveloose won and automatically qualified for the first live show of the 15 semifinalts.

The cast of the show released a single called "More To Me" which went straight to no. 1 at the Flemish Ultratop 50 Single Charts.

== Finalists ==
(ages stated at time of contest)

Contestant	Age	Hometown	Voted Off	Liveshow Theme
Kevin Kayirangwa	20	Antwerp	22 April 2011; Winner	Rock; Grand Finale
Kato Callebaut	19	Leuven	20 May 2007	Rock; Grand Finale
Kristof De Cleyn	28	Brecht	13 May 2007	Choices
Maureen Vanherberghen	23	Hoegaarden	6 May 2007	Foute Muziek
Dennis De Neyer	19	Sint-Genesius-Rode	29 April 2007	Dance & In Da Mix
Manuel Palomo	23	Bruges	29 April 2007	Dance & In Da Mix
Devon Vancuyl	21	Ostend	15 April 2007	Idool in Love
Lora Van Hooff	20	Lanaken	8 April 2011	In Symphony
Jonas Cole	27	Sint-Niklaas	1 April 2011	Made in Belgium
Alyssa Luypaert	18	Brussels	25 March 2011	Back to the 90s

== Live Shows ==
=== Top 15 – Contestants Choice ===
Group Performance: "More To Me"

Order	Contestant	Song (Original Artist)	Result
1	Astrid Wittevrongel	"Firework" (Katy Perry)	Eliminated
2	Devon Vancuyl	"I'm Yours" (Jason Mraz)	Safe
3	Lora Van Hooff	"Take A Bow" (Rihanna)	Bottom 10
4	Gregory Van Walle	"DJ Got Us Fallin' in Love" (Usher feat. Pitbull)	Eliminated
5	Maureen Vanherberghen	"Rolling in the Deep" (Adele)	Safe
6	Kristof De Cleyn	"Iris" (Goo Goo Dolls)	Bottom 10
7	Nour Lahdo	"I'm Like a Bird" (Nelly Furtado)	Eliminated
8	Dennis De Neyer	"You Give Me Something" (James Morrison)	Safe
9	Alyssa Luypaert	"Put Your Records On" (Corinne Bailey Rae)	Bottom 10
10	Falko De Bolster	"Can't Get You Out of My Head" (Kylie Minogue)	Eliminated
11	Saartje D'haveloose	"Kiss Me" (Sixpence None the Richer)	Eliminated
12	Jonas Cole	"Human Nature" (Michael Jackson)	Safe
13	Manuel Palomo	"Everything" (Michael Bublé)	Bottom 10
14	Kevin Kayirangwa	"Just the Way You Are" (Bruno Mars)	Bottom 10
15	Kato Callebaut	"Dancing On My Own" (Robyn)	Safe

=== Top 10 – Back to the 90s ===
Guest Judge: David Hasselhof
Group Performance: "Everybody's Free (To Feel Good)" (feat. Rozalla)

Order	Contestant	Song (Original Artist)	Result
1	Kristof De Cleyn	"Alive" (Pearl Jam)	Safe
2	Maureen Vanherberghen	"I'm Every Woman" (Whitney Houston)	Safe
3	Kato Callebaut	"Torn" (Natalie Imbruglia)	Safe
4	Manuel Palomo	"Smooth" (Carlos Santana feat. Rob Thomas)	Safe
5	Alyssa Luypaert	"Waiting for Tonight" (Jennifer Lopez)	Eliminated
6	Lora Van Hooff	"Show Me Love" (Robin S.)	Bottom 2
7	Kevin Kayirangwa	"Cosmic Girl" (Jamiroquai)	Safe
8	Devon Vancuyl	"Lemon Tree" (Fool's Garden)	Safe
9	Dennis De Neyer	"Breakfast at Tiffany's" (Deep Blue Something)	Bottom 3
10	Jonas Cole	"Stars" (Simply Red)	Safe

=== Top 9 - Made in Belgium ===
Guest Judge: Alex Callier
Group Performance: "Anger Never Dies" (feat. Hooverphonic)

Order	Contestant	Song (Original Artist)	Result
1	Kevin Kayirangwa	"Dance All Night" (Brahim)	Safe
2	Dennis De Neyer	"You and Me (In My Pocket)" (Milow)	Safe
3	Lora Van Hooff	"Risin'" (Natalia)	Bottom 3
4	Jonas Cole	"Through Before We Started" (Soulsister)	Eliminated
5	Kristof De Cleyn	"Scars" (Stan Van Samang)	Bottom 2
6	Maureen Vanherberghen	"Mad About You" (Hooverphonic)	Safe
7	Manuel Palomo	"Wrong" (Novastar)	Safe
8	Devon Vancuyl	"Never Get Enough" (Das Pop)	Safe
9	Kato Callebaut	"Crazy Vibes" (Selah Sue)	Safe

=== Top 8 - In Symphony ===
Guest Judge: Marco Borsato
Group Performance: "Rood"

Order	Contestant	Song (Original Artist)	Result
1	Devon Vancuyl	"Have a Nice Day" (Stereophonics)	Bottom 2
2	Kristof De Cleyn	"Beautiful Day" (U2)	Safe
3	Kato Callebaut	"Someone Like You" (Adele)	Safe
4	Manuel Palomo	"Englishman in New York" (Sting)	Safe
5	Lora Van Hooff	"Crazy" (Gnarls Barkley)	Eliminated
6	Dennis De Neyer	"Viva la Vida" (Coldplay)	Safe
7	Kevin Kayirangwa	"Apologize" (OneRepublic)	Bottom 3
8	Maureen Vanherberghen	"Release Me" (Agnes Carlsson)	Safe

=== Top 7 - Idool in Love ===
Guest Judge: Alexis Jordan
Guest Performance: "Happiness"

Order	Contestant	Song (Original Artist)	Result
1	Manuel Palomo	"Everlasting Love" (Love Affair)	Bottom 3
2	Maureen Vanherberghen	"Jungle Drum" (Emilíana Torrini)	Safe
3	Devon Vancuyl	"Hey There Delilah" (Plain White T's)	Eliminated
4	Dennis De Neyer	"Half of My Heart" (John Mayer)	Bottom 2
5	Kevin Kayirangwa	"Forget You" (Cee Lo Green)	Safe
6	Kristof De Cleyn	"Wicked Game" (Chris Isaak)	Safe
7	Kato Callebaut	"Price Tag" (Jessie J)	Safe

=== Top 6.1 - Rock ===
Guest Judge: Ray Cokes
Guest Performance: "The Candyshop" (The Baseballs)
Group Performance: "We Will Rock You"

Order	Contestant	Song (Original Artist)	Result
1	Manuel Palomo	"Animal" (Neon Trees)	Bottom 3
2	Kato Callebaut	"You Oughta Know" (Alanis Morissette)	Safe
3	Dennis De Neyer	"Behind Blue Eyes" (The Who)	Safe
4	Kristof De Cleyn	"Jolene" (The White Stripes)	Safe
5	Kevin Kayirangwa	"Beat It" (Fall Out Boy feat. John Mayer)	Saved
6	Maureen Vanherberghen	"Heavy Cross" (The Gossip)	Bottom 2

=== Top 6.2 - Dance & In Da Mix ===
Guest Judge: Regi Penxten
Group Performance: "Love Generation" (feat. Bob Sinclar)

Order	Contestant	Song (Original Artist)	Result
1	Kato Callebaut	"Hello" (Martin Solveig)	Safe
1	Kato Callebaut	"Walk On Water" (Milk Inc.)	Safe
2	Kristof De Cleyn	"Rain Down on Me" (DJ Tiesto)	Safe
2	Kristof De Cleyn	"Paparazzi" (Lady Gaga)	Safe
3	Maureen Vanherberghen	"No Stress" (Laurent Wolf)	Bottom 3
3	Maureen Vanherberghen	"Poker Face" (Lady Gaga)	Bottom 3
4	Manuel Palomo	"Cooler than Me" (Mike Posner)	Eliminated
4	Manuel Palomo	"More to Me" (Idool 2011 finalists)	Eliminated
5	Kevin Kayirangwa	"More" (Usher)	Safe
5	Kevin Kayirangwa	"Black and Gold" (Sam Sparro)	Safe
6	Dennis De Neyer	"Human" (The Killers)	Eliminated
6	Dennis De Neyer	"We All Are Dancing" (Yoav)	Eliminated

=== Top 4 - Foute Muziek ===
Guest Judge: Sven Ornelis & Kurt Rogiers
Group Performance:

Order	Contestant	Song (Original Artist)	Result
1	Kato Callebaut	"Dancing Queen" (ABBA)	Bottom 2
1	Kato Callebaut	"Het is een nacht" (Guus Meeuwis)	Bottom 2
2	Kevin Kayirangwa	"The Edge of Heaven" (Wham!)	Safe
2	Kevin Kayirangwa	"Suzanne" (VOF de Kunst)	Safe
3	Kristof De Cleyn	"I Was Made for Lovin' You" (Kiss)	Safe
3	Kristof De Cleyn	"Een beetje verliefd" (André Hazes)	Safe
4	Maureen Vanherberghen	"9 to 5" (Dolly Parton)	Eliminated
4	Maureen Vanherberghen	"Ik ben verliefd op jou" (Paul Severs)	Eliminated

=== Top 3 - Choices ===
Guest Judge: Dan Karaty
Group Performance:

Order	Contestant	Song (Original Artist)	Result
1	Kristof De Cleyn	"Little Lion Man" (Mumford & Sons)	Eliminated
1	Kristof De Cleyn	"Wheels" (Foo Fighters)	Eliminated
1	Kristof De Cleyn	"Always on the Run" (Lenny Kravitz)	Eliminated
2	Kevin Kayirangwa	"Yeah 3x" (Chris Brown)	Safe
2	Kevin Kayirangwa	"Señorita" (Justin Timberlake)	Safe
2	Kevin Kayirangwa	"He's Misstra Know-It-All" (Stevie Wonder)	Safe
3	Kato Callebaut	"The Writer" (Ellie Goulding)	Safe
3	Kato Callebaut	"I Wrote the Book" (Beth Ditto)	Safe
3	Kato Callebaut	"Samson" (Regina Spektor)	Safe

=== Top 2 - Finale ===
Guest Judge: Natalia
Group Performance:

Order	Contestant	Song (Original Artist)	Result
1	Kevin Kayirangwa	"Master Blaster (Jammin')" (Stevie Wonder)	Winner
1	Kevin Kayirangwa	"Forget You" (CeeLo Green)	Winner
1	Kevin Kayirangwa	"Drop a Little" (duet with Natalia)	Winner
1	Kevin Kayirangwa	"She's Got Moves" (Kevin Kayirangwa)	Winner
2	Kato Callebaut	"Pack Up" (Eliza Doolittle)	Runner-up
2	Kato Callebaut	"Dancing on My Own" (Robyn)	Runner-up
2	Kato Callebaut	"I Want You Back" (duet with Natalia)	Runner-up
2	Kato Callebaut	"The Joker" (Kato Callebaut)	Runner-up

== Elimination Chart ==
Legend
Female	Male	Top 15	Top 10	Winner

Safe	Safe First	Safe Last	Eliminated	Judges' Save

Stage:		Top 15	Finals								
Week:		3/18	3/25	4/1	4/8	4/15	4/22	TBA	TBA	TBA	TBA
Place	Contestant	Result									
1	Kevin Kayirangwa	Judges			Bottom 3		Saved				Winner
2	Kato Callebaut	Viewers							Bottom 2		Runner-Up
3	Kristof De Cleyn	Judges		Bottom 2						Elim	
4	Maureen Vanherberghen	Viewers					Bottom 2	Bottom 3	Elim		
5-6	Dennis De Neyer	Viewers	Bottom 3			Bottom 2		Elim			
5-6	Manuel Palomo	Judges				Bottom 3	Bottom 3	Elim			
7	Devon Vancuyl	Viewers			Bottom 2	Elim					
8	Lora Van Hooff	Judges	Bottom 2	Bottom 3	Elim						
9	Jonas Cole	Viewers		Elim							
10	Alyssa Luypaert	Judges	Elim								
Semi	Astrid Wittevrongel	Elim									
Semi	Falko De Bolster	Elim									
Semi	Gregory Van Walle	Elim									
Semi	Nour Lahdo	Elim									
Semi	Saartje D'haveloose	Elim									
