= 1999 in Belgian television =

This is a list of Belgian television related events from 1999.

== Events ==
- 13 March - Vanessa Chinitor is selected to represent Belgium at the 1999 Eurovision Song Contest with her song "Like the Wind". She is selected to be the forty-second Belgian Eurovision entry during Eurosong held at the VRT Studios in Schelle.
- Unknown - Willy Goossens wins the tenth season of VTM Soundmixshow, performing as Gilbert Bécaud.

== Debuts ==
- 30 August - Wizzy & Woppy (1999-2007)

== Television shows ==
=== 1980s ===
- VTM Soundmixshow (1989-1995, 1997-2000)

=== 1990s ===
- Samson en Gert (1990–present)
- Familie (1991–present)
- Wittekerke (1993-2008)
- Thuis (1995–present)
