= Herman Schueremans =

Flemish politician and concert promotor

- Born: 5 January 1954 (age 72); Leuven, Belgium
- Occupation: politician

Herman Schueremans (born 5 January 1954) is a Flemish politician and concertpromotor. Schueremans was involved from the start with Rock Werchter and Torhout-Werchter. Now he still organises Rock Werchter for Live Nation, that bought the two festivals. From 2004 to 2012, he was also a member of the Flemish parliament for the Flemish Liberals and Democrats.
