= 1992 in Belgian television =

This is a list of Belgian television related events from 1992.

== Events ==
- 8 March - Morgane is selected to represent Belgium at the 1992 Eurovision Song Contest with her song "Nous, on veut des violons". She is selected to be the thirty-seventh Belgian Eurovision entry during Eurosong held at the RTBF Studios in Brussels.
- Unknown - Jan van den Bossche, performing as Gerard Joling, wins the fourth season of VTM Soundmixshow.

== Television shows ==
=== 1980s ===
- VTM Soundmixshow (1989-1995, 1997-2000)

=== 1990s ===
- Jambers
- Samson en Gert (1990–2019)
- Familie (1991–present)
