= Dean Delannoit =

Belgian singer (born 1989)

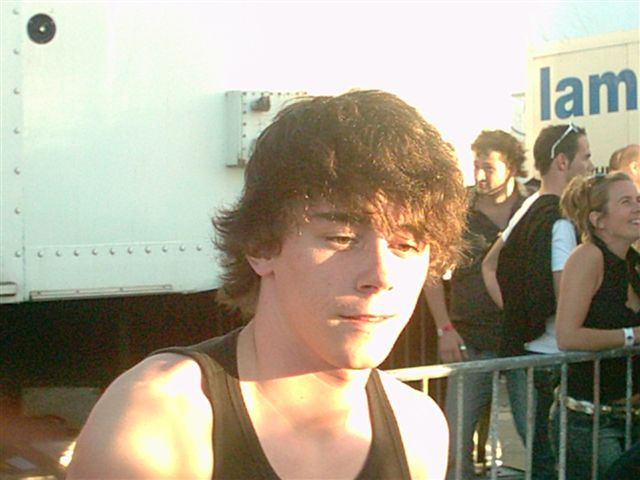
- Delannoit in 2008

Background information
- Born: 27 January 1989 (age 37)
- Origin: Geraardsbergen, Belgium
- Genres: Rock, pop
- Occupation: Musician
- Instruments: Guitar, Vocals
- Years active: 2007–2012
- Label: Sony BMG (2007–2012)
- Website: Official Website

Dean Delannoit (born 27 January 1989), most known by the mononym Dean, is a Belgian singer who was the winner of Idool 2007, the third season of the Belgian version of Pop Idol. His first album, So Many Ways, released in 2007, spent 11 weeks in the #1 spot in the Belgian charts.

In May 2012, he joined Kevin Kayirangwa (winner of Idool 2011) and Dennis De Neyer (a contestant in the same series) to form the Belgian Flemish boyband 3M8S.

== Songs performed on Idool 2007 ==
- Workshop 1: "Let's Work Together" (Canned Heat)
- Workshop 2: "Snow (Hey Oh)" (Red Hot Chili Peppers)
- My Idol: "She Moves in Her Own Way" (The Kooks)
- Rolling Stones and The Beatles: "Start Me Up" (The Rolling Stones)
- Dutch Songs: "Iedereen Is Van De Wereld" (The Lau)
- My Birth Year: "Keep on Rocking in the Free World" (Neil Young)
- French Songs: "Une Belle Histoire" (Michel Fugain)
- Big Band: "Ain't That a Kick in the Head" (Dean Martin)
- Unplugged: "You Don't Know" (Milow); "Nothing Else Matters" (Metallica)
- Rock Songs: "Ruby" (Kaiser Chiefs); "Boulevard of Broken Dreams" (Green Day); "Great Balls of Fire" (Jerry Lee Lewis)
- Finale: "Keep on Rocking in the Free World" (Neil Young); "Ain't No Sunshine" (Bill Withers); "She's the One" (Robbie Williams); "Start Me Up" (The Rolling Stones); "So Many Ways"

== After Idool ==
=== Singing career ===
Dean was signed to a label where he had relative success with a number of singles and the album So Many Ways, an album of covers of well-known hits in addition to the title track "So many Ways", his winning song in Idool. The album topped the Ultratop Belgian Flemish Singles Chart, after the title track had reached #2 on the Ultratop Belgian Flemish Singles Chart.

=== Television career ===
In 2010, he was co-host of the Belgian version of the Belenlux edition of My Camp Rock titled My Rock Camp Benelux alongside host Sita Vermeulen. The show aired on the local Disney Channel. The winners of the show were Cheyenne & Mayleen.

In 2011, he took part in another reality television show, Disney's Friends for Change Games as part of 9-member Red Team, called the World Wildlife Fund with their captain and leader Mitchel Musso (Captain). His red team won. Delannoit was the only member from Europe in Team Red. All the eight other teammates were Americans: Mitchel Musso (Captain), Jake T. Austin, Kelsey Chow, Davis Cleveland, Zendaya, Roshon Fegan, Carlon Jeffery and Doc Shaw.

== In band 3M8S ==
Starting May 2012, he is a member of the boyband 3M8S (pronounced Three mates). The band includes besides Dean (Idool 2007 season 3 winner), Idool 2011 (season 4) winner Kevin Kayirangwa and 2011 contestant Dennis De Neyer, who had finished 5th-6th on the 2011 show.

== Personal life ==
He is smaller cousin to the Belgian boxer Cyrille Delannoit (1926-1998)

== Discography ==
=== Albums ===
Year	Album	Peak positions	Notes
Year	Album	BEL (Fl)	Notes
2007	So Many Ways	1	Track list: 1. "So Many Ways"; 2. "She's Not There"; 3. "Kiss"; 4. "Sandy"; 5. "Ain't No Sunshine When She's Gone"; 6. "Hello"; 7. "Heartbreak Hotel"; 8. "Crazy Little Thing Called Love"; 9. "Great Balls of Fire"; 10. "Rock Your World"; 11. "School of Rock"; 12. "Footloose"; 13. "Ain't That a Kick in the Head"

=== Singles ===
Year	Single	Peak positions		Album
Year	Single	BEL (Fl) Ultratop	BEL (Fl) Ultratip*	Album
2007	"So Many Ways"	2	–	So Many Ways
2007	"Blue Hotel"	–	16	
2008	"We Don't Belong"	17	–	
2008	"You"	41	–	
2010	"Wouldn't Change a Thing" (Sita & Dean)	–	26	
2011	"All I Can See"	–	24	
2011	"Just a Few More Days"	–	39	
2011	"Easier Said Than Done"	–	16	
2011	"Break Your Fall"	–	24	
2015	"Lama"	–	59	
2015	"Zonder betekenis"	–	67	
2016	"Ik heb je wel door"	–	22	
2016	"Déjà vu"	47	–	
2017	"MILF"	–	36	
2017	"Sta"	–	4	
2017	"Klatergoud"	–	14	
2018	"Koorts"	–	18	
2018	"Kristal"	–	12	
2019	"Ik wil het"	–	7	

*Did not appear in the official Belgian Ultratop 50 charts, but rather in the bubbling under Ultratip charts.

==== Other singles ====
- 2012: "De allermooiste tijd van het jaar" (as part of A Stars)

Preceded by Joeri Fransen	Idool; Winner; Season 3 (2007)	Succeeded by Kevin Kayirangwa
