= 1993 in Belgian television =

This is a list of Belgian television related events from 1993.

== Events ==
- 8 March - Barbara Dex is selected to represent Belgium at the 1993 Eurovision Song Contest with her song "Iemand als jij". She is selected to be the thirty-eighth Belgian Eurovision entry during Eurosong held at the Knokke Casino in Knokke.
- Unknown - Wim Dekoker, performing as John Denver wins the fifth season of VTM Soundmixshow.

== Debuts ==
=== Domestic ===
- 31 August - Wittekerke (1993-2008)

=== New International Programming ===
- (United Kingdom) Noddy's Toyland Adventures

== Television shows ==
=== 1980s ===
- VTM Soundmixshow (1989-1995, 1997–2000)

=== 1990s ===
- Samson en Gert (1990–present)
- Familie (1991–present)
- Jambers

== Networks and services ==
=== Conversions and rebrandings ===
Old network name	New network name	Type	Conversion Date	Notes	Source
Tele 21	Arte/21 & Sports 21	Cable and satellite	Unknown		
