= 1998 in Belgian television =

This is a list of Belgian television related events from 1998.

== Events ==
- 13 March - Mélanie Cohl is selected to represent Belgium at the 1998 Eurovision Song Contest with her song "Dis oui". She is selected to be the forty-first Belgian Eurovision entry during Eurosong held at the RTBF Studios in Brussels.
- Esther Sels, performing as Janet Jackson wins the ninth season of VTM Soundmixshow.
- Belgium finished sixth at Eurovision 1998 held in Birmingham, United Kingdom.
- July – VNU agrees to sell its 44% stake in VTM, a Belgian commercial television channel, to Flemish Media Holding in Belgium.

== Television shows ==
=== 1980s ===
- VTM Soundmixshow (1989-1995, 1997-2000)

=== 1990s ===
- Jambers
- Samson en Gert (1990–present)
- Familie (1991–present)
- Wittekerke (1993-2008)
- Thuis (1995–present)
