= 1995 in Belgian television =

This is a list of Belgian television related events from 1995, which saw the introduction of a second wave of new commercial stations.

== Events ==
- 12 March - Frédéric Etherlinck is selected to represent Belgium at the 1995 Eurovision Song Contest with his song "La voix est libre". He is selected to be the thirty-ninth Belgian Eurovision entry during Eurosong held at the RTBF Studios in Brussels.
- 22 September - The seventh season of VTM Soundmixshow is won by George Darmoise, performing as Tom Jones.

== Debuts ==
- 23 December - Thuis (1995–present)

== Television shows ==
=== 1990s ===
- Jambers
- Samson en Gert (1990–present)
- Familie (1991–present)
- Wittekerke (1993–2008)

== Ending this year ==
- VTM Soundmixshow (1989-1995, 1997–2000)

== Networks and services ==
=== Launches ===
Network	Type	Launch date	Notes	Source
Ka2	Cable and satellite	31 January		
RTL Club	Cable and satellite	15 February		
