= 1997 in Belgian television =

This is a list of Belgian television related events from 1997.

== Events ==
- Unknown - Sarah De Koster wins the eighth season of VTM Soundmixshow, performing as Alanis Morissette.

== Debuts ==
- Unknown - VTM Soundmixshow (1989-1995, 1997-2000)

== Television shows ==
=== 1990s ===
- Jambers
- Samson en Gert (1990–present)
- Familie (1991–present)
- Wittekerke (1993-2008)
- Thuis (1995–present)

== Networks and services ==
=== Conversions and rebrandings ===
Old network name	New network name	Type	Conversion Date	Notes	Source
BRTN TV2	Ketnet	Cable and satellite	December 1		
BRTN TV2	VRT Canvas	Cable and satellite	December 1		
Ka2	Kaanal2	Cable and satellite	Unknown		
RTBF1	RTBF La Une	Cable and satellite	Unknown		
RTBF 21	RTBF La Deux	Cable and satellite	Unknown		
