= Royal Dutch Theatre (Ghent) =

Building in Ghent, Belgium

Coordinates: 51.0537°N 3.7259°E

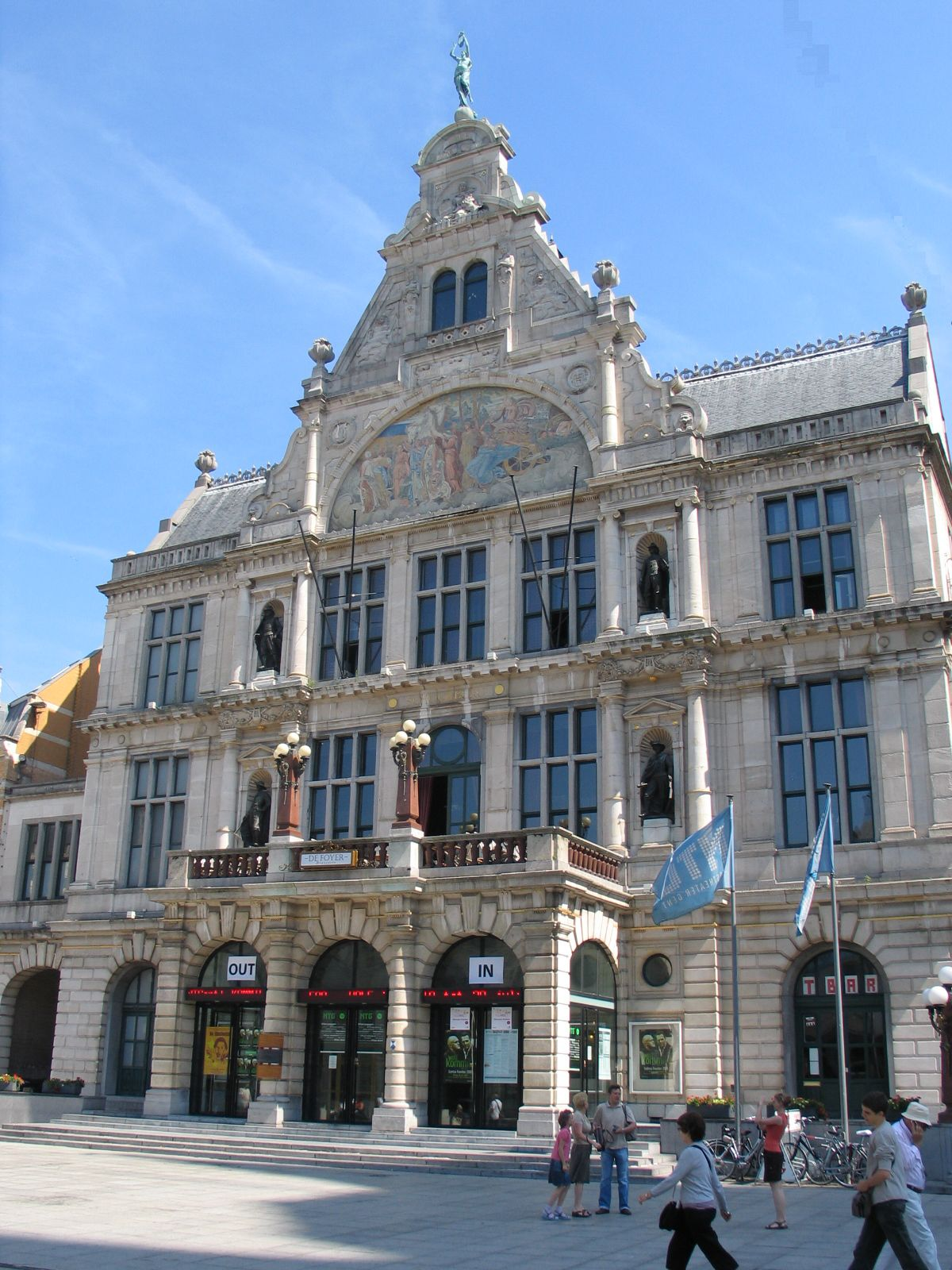
The Royal Dutch Theatre

The Royal Dutch Theatre Dutch: Koninklijke Nederlandse Schouwburg, or KNS, is a theater building in the Belgian city of Ghent.

The theater is located on the northern side of Sint-Baafsplein, which was created in 1897 by demolishing older buildings that obstructed the view of the Saint Bavo Cathedral.

== History ==
The theater was constructed between 1897 and 1899 on the site of the former Regnessestraat. It was designed in an eclectic style with predominantly Renaissance features by architect Edmond De Vigne.

It became the new home for the professional theater company Nederlandsch Tooneel van Gent (1871-1945), which had previously performed at the Minardschouwburg. In 1945, this company merged into the Nationaal Toneel, after which the theater served as a secondary stage for the Antwerp KNS. In 1965, a new theater company, NTGent, was founded.

The building is dated on the facade ANNO 1897, but was inaugurated on October 1, 1899. The facade consists of three building levels with five bays. The central part of the three bays is strongly accentuated and is flanked on the second and third levels by four statues of men in 17th-century attire, created by Louis Mast. These statues represent the four rhetorical chambers of Ghent: De Fonteine, Sint-Barbara, Sint-Agnete, and Maria ter Ere.

The central part is crowned by a monumental gable. In a rounded tympanum, a mosaic is embedded, measuring nine meters wide and four meters high, made up of 70,000 ceramic tiles in 500 different shades. It depicts a mythological scene based on a design by Constant Montald, showing Apollo in his sun chariot, accompanied by the nine Muses, each recognizable by their respective attributes. At the top stands a bronze statue of a woman with a lyre. Designed by the Ghent sculptor Aloys Buyens, it represents the Genius of Music.

Since 1986, the building has been protected as a monument.
