= Idool (TV series) =

- Created by: Simon Fuller
- Presented by: Koen Wauters; Kris Wauters
- Judges: Jean Blaute; Jan Leyers; Nina De Man; Herman Schueremans and others
- Country of origin: Belgium
- No. of seasons: 4

Production
- Production companies: FremantleMedia; 19 Television

Original release
- Release: January 3, 2003 – May 20, 2011

Idool is the Belgian version of the Idol series. The series was launched in late 2002 by Belgian television network vtm. The contestants are first narrowed down to 100 contestants, and then down to 30-50 through several auditions and tests by a panel of judges. From this point on, the viewers decide who are in and who are out, and the judges limit themselves to commenting. TV viewers being what they are, the votes are based not solely on the singer's vocal performance, but also on their looks, clothes, entertainment value, and other factors.

In difference to the versions from other countries of the franchise, several contestants achieved on-going success in the local music industry, most notably Natalia Druyts, runner-up from season one, who managed to sell over 400,000 albums, and over 1 million concert tickets between 2003 and 2010 in Flanders; and Hadise Açıkgöz, who did not even make the top 10 in Season 1 but nevertheless became a career musician who represented Turkey in the Eurovision Song Contest 2009 placing 4th. In 2012 vtm replaced Idool with another singing talent competition, The Voice van Vlaanderen, while still retaining the rights to Idool's format.

== Season Synopsis ==
=== Season 1 ===
Auditions were held in Antwerp, Ghent & Brussels where the top 100 was invited to the next round. The season was launched in late 2002 and was aired until May when Peter Evrard narrowly beat Natalia Druyts with just 50.7% of the votes. Evrard would eventually represent his country on World Idol later that year where managed to place as 2nd runner-up but was clearly outdone by his female competition on a larger scale. The show saw most of its finalists landing record deals, most notably Wim Soutaer and Brahim Attaeb, who placed 3rd and 4th respectively. Other cast members included Hadise Açıkgöz, who started a successful singing career the year later and became the host of the second season of X Factor, Udo Mechels who won the first season of X Factor and Johan Waem, who achieved European-wide success under his stage name Danzel. All of the three managed to enter the top 50 but were not chosen by the viewers to advance to the final 10.

=== Season 2 ===
The second season started exactly one year after the final of the first season, but the high expectations based on the former success of the format could not have been fulfilled. Winner Joeri Fransen only recorded one album and was later dropped by his record company. Second runner-up Sandrine Van Handenhoven almost presented her country in the Eurovision Song Contest 2007 and became the host of the local Big Brother version. Annelies Cappaert, who placed 10th, and her sister Sarah Cappaert, who made the top 30, later participated on X-Factor as The Cappaert Sisters where they placed second behind Idool 2003-semifinalist Udo Mechels.

=== Season 3 ===
After an absence for three years, in which the first Flemish season of X Factor was aired on VTM, the show returned with the Wauters as a host. Jean Blaute remained as the only judge from the last two seasons. On May 23, 2007 Dean Delannoit won over Esther Sels, making him the third male contestant to win the show. His album managed to top the Flemish charts and his debut-single placed 2nd. However like Fransen, he failed to achieve any significant success after his debut. In 2012 he teamed up with later winner Kevin and finalist Dennis to form 3m8s.

=== Season 4 ===
Season 4 started airing on February 2, 2011. The Wauters brothers were hosting their 4th season and Jean Blaute remained as the sole original judge seated next to three firsttimers on the panel. Prior to the kick-off the internet users had to choose their favourite among the online-applicants who automatically qualified for the top 15. As an innovation, the judges-save rule was introduced in which the judging panel were able to save an eliminated contestant. The save-could only be used once in the season. The season was won by Kevin Kayirangwa. Following his victory he scored three hits. Because he was dropped by his record company, he formed 3M8S with former winner of Idool 2007 Dean Delannoit and Dennis De Neyer, a co-contestant in season 4 of Idool.

== Judges, presenters and winners ==
Judges

- Jean Blaute (2003–11)
- Jan Leyers (2003–04)
- Nina De Man (2003–04)
- Bart Brusseleers (2003–04)
- Vera Mann (2007)
- Herman Schueremans (2007)
- Patrick Carbonez (2007)
- Sylvia Van Driesche (2011)
- Wouter Van Belle (2011)
- Koen Buyse (2011)

Presenters

- Kris Wauters (2004–11)
- Koen Wauters (2004–11)
- Sean (co-host) (2011)

Winners

- Peter Evrard (2003, Season 1)
- Joeri Fransen (2004, Season 2)
- Dean Delannoit (2007, Season 3)
- Kevin Kayirangwa (2011, Season 4)
