= Big & Betsy =

Belgian children's television series

- Genre: Children's TV series
- Starring: Peter Thyssen; Maike Boerdam
- Country of origin: Belgium
- Original language: Dutch

Production
- Producer: Studio 100
- Running time: 25 minutes

Big & Betsy is a Belgian children's television series produced by Studio 100. The show is centred on the female farmer Betsy, her talking pig Big and their friends.

In 1999, the duo Big and Betsy announced children's television shows for Kanaal 2. This proved very successful and they were given their own television series in November 2000. Approximately 75 episodes have been made.

== Characters ==
Name	Portrayed by	Description
Betsy	Maike Boerdam	Betsy is the owner of a farm. She is a bit naughty and likes to play pranks on her friends.
Big	Peter Thyssen	Big is a flatulent pig (portrayed by a puppet) who is able to speak and delivers his catchphrases "Fopje flauw mopje" and "Sorry de snorry Betsy" throughout the show. He is not very polite and is prone to breaking wind several times per episode. He likes to eat, especially pie, and suffers from obesity.
Theresa Pruim	Myriam Bronzwaar	Mrs. Pruim is the neighbour of Big and Betsy. She is arrogant, snobbish and overly fond of etiquette and courtesy. Big and Betsy are not exactly best friends with Mrs. Pruim, who is their favourite target for practical jokes.
Pieter-Paul Pruim	Jan Van Hecke	Pieter-Paul is Mrs. Pruim's down-trodden adult son. He is secretly in love with Betsy, but his mother does not like it when her son spends time with Big and Betsy.
Janus	Chris Cauwenberghs	Janus is the neighbour of Big and Betsy and he is a farmer as well. Farmer Janus is naive and easily deceived by Big and Betsy's schemes.
Agent Suikerbuik	Fred Van Kuyk	Agent Suikerbuik is the town's police officer, who is a true gourmand. He secretly enjoys Mrs. Pruim's discomfiture when Big and Betsy play their jokes and occasionally joins in with the fun.
