= Idool 2007 =

- Season 2007
- Hosted by: Koen Wauters; Kris Wauters
- Judges: Jean Blaute; Bernard Carbonez; Vera Mann; Herman Schueremans
- Winner: Dean Delannoit
- Runner-up: Esther Sels

Release
- Original network: VTM
- Original release: 20 February – 25 May 2007

Season chronology
- ← Previous; Idool 2004 Next → Idool 2011

Idool 2007 was the third season of the Belgian adaptation of the Idol series. It premiered on VTM on 20 February 2007. Dean Delannoit won the competition on 25 May 2007.

== Finals ==
=== Finalists ===
(ages stated at time of contest)

Contestant	Age	Hometown	Voted Off	Liveshow Theme
Dean Delannoit	18	Geraardsbergen	Winner	Grand Finale
Esther Sels	25	Laakdal	25 May 2007	Grand Finale
Andrei Lugovski	24	Ostend	18 May 2007	Rock Hits
Elke Severijns	20	Weelde	11 May 2007	Unplugged
Wim Vandereyken	26	Houthalen	4 May 2007	Big Band
Kim Buttafuoco	22	Kuringen	27 April 2007	French Songs
Tom De Bie	27	Deinze	20 April 2007	My Birth Year
Kira Peters	17	Genk	13 April 2007	Dutch Songs
Adil Aarab	17	Berchem	6 April 2007	The Beatles & The Rolling Stones
Brenda Vercammen	20	Herselt	30 March 2007	My Idol

=== Finals Elimination Chart ===
Legend
Did Not Perform	Female	Male	Top 20	Top 10	Winner

Safe	Safe First	Safe Last	Eliminated

Stage:		Semi				Finals								
Week:		03/16	03/17	03/23	03/24	03/30	04/06	04/13	04/20	04/27	05/04	05/11	05/18	05/25
Place	Contestant	Result												
1	Dean Delannoit													Winner
2	Esther Sels					Btm 3			Btm 3					Runner-Up
3	Andrei Lugowskij										Btm 2	Btm 2	Elim	
4	Elke Severijns						Btm 2		Btm 2	Btm 2		Elim		
5	Wim Vandereyken						Btm 3	Btm 2		Btm 3	Elim			
6	Kim Buttafuoco							Btm 3		Elim				
7	Tom De Bie					Btm 2			Elim					
8	Kira Peters							Elim						
9	Adil Aarab						Elim							
10	Brenda Vercammen					Elim								
11-16	Alexander Chiafele				Elim									
11-16	Dimitri Jambé				Elim									
11-16	Eley Van Hemelrijck				Elim									
11-16	Adèle Monheim			Elim										
11-16	Catharina Lucas			Elim										
11-16	Clara De Decker			Elim										
17-20	Kim Vanrooy		Elim											
17-20	Yannick Willems		Elim											
17-20	Lydia Guiso	Elim												
17-20	Veva Van Overveld	Elim												

=== Live Show Details ===
==== Heat 1 - Top 10 Girls (16 March 2007) ====
Order	Artist	Song (original artists)	Result
1	Adèle Monheim	"Thank You" (Dido)	Safe
2	Lydia Guiso	"How Come You Don't Call Me" (Alicia Keys)	Eliminated
3	Elke Severijns	"Dear Mr. President" (Pink)	Safe
4	Kim Buttafuoco	"Foolish Games" (Jewel)	Safe
5	Clara De Decker	"Sir Duke" (Stevie Wonder)	Safe
6	Veva Van Overveld	"You Hurt Me" (Hooverphonic)	Eliminated
7	Esther Sels	"Hurt" (Christina Aguilera)	Safe
8	Catharina Lucas	"I'm Not So Tough" (Ilse DeLange)	Safe
9	Brenda Vercammen	"Right to Be Wrong" (Joss Stone)	Safe
10	Kira Peters	"I'll Be There" (The Jackson 5)	Safe

==== Heat 2 - Top 10 Boys (17 March 2007) ====
Order	Artist	Song (original artists)	Result
1	Yannick Willems	"All at Sea" (Jamie Cullum)	Eliminated
2	Kim Vanrooy	"The Best Is Yet to Come" (Novastar)	Eliminated
3	Dean Delannoit	"Let's Work Together" (Canned Heat)	Safe
4	Alexander Chiafele	"Hero" (Enrique Iglesias)	Safe
5	Wim Vandereyken	"Hallelujah" (Leonard Cohen)	Safe
6	Tom De Bie	"You Give Me Something" (James Morrison)	Safe
7	Adil Aarab	"Part-Time Lover" (Stevie Wonder)	Safe
8	Eley Van Hemelrijck	"You Are So Beautiful" (Joe Cocker)	Safe
9	Andrei Lugowskij	"You're Still You" (Josh Groban)	Safe
10	Dimitri Jambé	"Too Much Love Will Kill You" (Queen)	Safe

==== Heat 3 - Top 8 Girls (23 March 2007) ====
Order	Artist	Song (original artists)	Result
1	Kira Peters	"Don't Know Why" (Norah Jones)	Safe
2	Clara De Decker	"Another Day" (Buckshot LeFonque)	Eliminated
3	Catharina Lucas	"Like the Way I Do" (Melissa Etheridge)	Eliminated
4	Esther Sels	"Vision of Love" (Mariah Carey)	Safe
5	Elke Severijns	"Jerusalem" (Anouk)	Safe
6	Adèle Monheim	"Fever" (Peggy Lee)	Eliminated
7	Kim Buttafuoco	"River Deep – Mountain High" (Tina Turner)	Safe
8	Brenda Vercammen	"Ironic" (Alanis Morissette)	Safe

==== Heat 4 - Top 8 Boys (24 March 2007) ====
Order	Artist	Song (original artists)	Result
1	Alexander Chiafele	"Stand By Me" (Ben E. King)	Eliminated
2	Eley Van Hemelrijck	"Superstition" (Stevie Wonder)	Eliminated
3	Adil Aarab	"Another Day in Paradise" (Phil Collins)	Safe
4	Dimitri Jambé	"Bend and Break" (Keane)	Eliminated
5	Andrei Lugowskij	"Nella Fantasia" (Il Divo)	Safe
6	Tom De Bie	"Leef" (Sarah Bettens)	Safe
7	Wim Vandereyken	"Winter in July" (Udo Mechels)	Safe
8	Dean Delannoit	"Snow (Hey Oh)" (Red Hot Chili Pipers)	Safe

==== Live Show 1 (30 March 2007) ====
Theme: My Idol

Order	Artist	Song (original artists)	Result
1	Brenda Vercammen	"Walk Away" (Kelly Clarkson)	Eliminated
2	Tom De Bie	"Mr. Jones" (Counting Crows)	Bottom two
3	Kira Peters	"A Woman's Worth" (Alicia Keys)	Safe
4	Andrei Lugowskij	"Gira con Me" (Josh Groban)	Safe
5	Elke Severijns	"U + Ur Hand" (Pink)	Safe
6	Adil Aarab	"Beautiful Soul" (Jesse McCartney)	Safe
7	Kim Buttafuoco	"Strani amori" (Laura Pausini)	Safe
8	Dean Delannoit	"She Moves in Her Own Way" (The Kooks)	Safe
9	Esther Sels	"Emotion" (Samantha Sang)	Bottom three
10	Wim Vandereyken	"A Whiter Shade of Pale" (Procol Harum)	Safe

==== Live Show 2 (6 April 2007) ====
Theme: The Beatles & The Rolling Stones

Order	Artist	Song (original artists)	Result
1	Adil Aarab	"Here Comes the Sun" (The Beatles)	Eliminated
2	Elke Severijns	"(I Can't Get No) Satisfaction" (The Rolling Stones)	Bottom two
3	Wim Vandereyken	"Got to Get You into My Life" (The Beatles)	Bottom three
4	Dean Delannoit	"Start Me Up" (The Rolling Stones)	Safe
5	Esther Sels	"Don't Let Me Down" (The Beatles)	Safe
6	Tom De Bie	"You've Got to Hide Your Love Away" (The Beatles)	Safe
7	Kim Buttafuoco	"Wild Horses" (The Rolling Stones)	Safe
8	Kira Peters	"Can't Buy Me Love" (The Beatles)	Safe
9	Andrei Lugowskij	"The Long and Winding Road" (The Beatles)	Safe

==== Live Show 3 (13 April 2007) ====
Theme: Dutch Songs

Order	Artist	Song (original artists)	Result
1	Dean Delannoit	"Iedereen is van de wereld" (The Scene)	Safe
2	Kim Buttafuoco	"Wereld zonder jou" (Marco Borsato & Trijntje Oosterhuis)	Bottom three
3	Andrei Lugowskij	"Dromen zijn bedrog" (Marco Borsato)	Safe
4	Kira Peters	"Ik wil jou" (Gene Thomas)	Eliminated
5	Wim Vandereyken	"Is dit nu later" (Stef Bos)	Bottom two
6	Elke Severijns	"Hou me vast" (Volumia!)	Safe
7	Tom De Bie	"Oud en versleten" (Yevgueni)	Safe
8	Esther Sels	"Jij mag altijd op me rekenen" (Isabelle A)	Safe

==== Live Show 4 (20 April 2007) ====
Theme: My Birth Year

Order	Artist	Song (original artists)	Result
1	Elke Severijns	"You Keep Me Hangin' On" (Kim Wilde)	Bottom two
2	Esther Sels	"And I Am Telling You I'm Not Going" (Jennifer Holliday)	Bottom three
3	Kim Buttafuoco	"Let's Hear It for the Boy" (Deniece Williams)	Safe
4	Andrei Lugowskij	"Every Breath You Take" (The Police)	Safe
5	Dean Delannoit	"Rockin' in the Free World" (Neil Young)	Safe
6	Tom De Bie	"Is She Really Going Out with Him?" (Joe Jackson)	Eliminated
7	Wim Vandereyken	"Everybody's Got to Learn Sometime" (The Korgis)	Safe

==== Live Show 5 (27 April 2007) ====
Theme: French Songs

Order	Artist	Song (original artists)	Result
1	Elke Severijns	"Mademoiselle chante le blues" (Patricia Kaas)	Bottom two
2	Esther Sels	"Sensualité" (Axelle Red)	Safe
3	Kim Buttafuoco	"Il jouait du piano debout" (France Gall)	Eliminated
4	Andrei Lugowskij	"Hymne à l'amour" (Johnny Hallyday)	Safe
5	Dean Delannoit	"Une belle histoire" (Michel Fugain)	Safe
6	Wim Vandereyken	"Le temps des cathédrales" (Bruno Pelletier)	Bottom three

==== Live Show 6 (4 May 2007) ====
Theme: Big Band

Order	Artist	Song (original artists)	Result
1	Elke Severijns	"It's Oh So Quiet" (Björk)	Safe
2	Esther Sels	"Hanky Panky" (Madonna)	Safe
3	Andrei Lugowskij	"Fly Me to the Moon" (Frank Sinatra)	Bottom two
4	Wim Vandereyken	"Come Fly with Me" (Frank Sinatra)	Eliminated
5	Dean Delannoit	"Ain't That a Kick in the Head?" (Dean Martin)	Safe

==== Live Show 7 (11 May 2007) ====
Theme: Unplugged

Order	Artist	First song (original artists)	Second song	Result
1	Esther Sels	"Fallin'" (Alicia Keys)	"Lil Star" (Kelis)	Safe
2	Elke Severijns	"Lost" (Anouk)	"Just a Girl" (No Doubt)	Eliminated
3	Andrei Lugowskij	"Grace Kelly" (Mika)	"Miserere" (Andrea Bocelli)	Bottom two
4	Dean Delannoit	"You Don't Know" (Milow)	"Nothing Else Matters" (Metallica)	Safe

==== Live Show 8: Semi-final (18 May 2007) ====
Theme: Rock Hits

Order	Artist	First song (original artists)	Second song	Third song	Result
1	Esther Sels	"Walk Away" (Kelly Clarkson)	"You Oughta Know" (Alanis Morissette)	"Don't Speak" (No Doubt)	Safe
2	Andrei Lugowskij	"Life on Mars" (David Bowie)	"One" (U2)	"The Show Must Go On" (Queen)	Eliminated
3	Dean Delannoit	"Ruby" (Kaiser Chiefs)	"Boulevard of Broken Dreams" (Green Day)	"Great Balls of Fire" (Jerry Lee Lewis)	Safe

==== Live final (25 May 2007) ====
Theme: Rock Hits

Order	Artist	First song	Second song	Third song	Fourth song	Fifth song	Result
1	Esther Sels	"You Oughta Know"	"The Trouble with Love Is"	"I Say a Little Prayer"	"Fallin'"	"That Will Make My Day"	Runner-up
2	Dean Delannoit	"Rockin' in the Free World"	"Ain't No Sunshine"	"She's the One"	"Start Me Up"	"So Many Ways"	Winner
