= Wizzy & Woppy =

- DVD cover of the show
- Genre: Youth
- Starring: Barbara De Jonge; Carl Ridders; Dirk Bosschaert; Hans Van Cauwenberghe
- Country of origin: Belgium
- Original language: Flemish

Production
- Producer: Studio 100
- Running time: 5 mins.

Wizzy & Woppy is a Flemish children's television show produced by Studio 100, centered on four animal friends who live together in a pet store.

The show premiered on August 30, 1999, and the final episode was broadcast in 2007. The show was broadcast in Flanders and the Netherlands.

== Characters ==
- Wizzy (portrayed by Barbara De Jonge) is a mouse. She's a bit naughty, but she can be sweet. She shares a cage with Woppy.
- Woppy (portrayed by Carl Ridders) is a mouse. He's naughty and likes to prank his friends. He shares a cage with Wizzy.
- Dongo (portrayed by Dirk Bosschaert) is a tortoise. He is lazy and sleeps most of the time. He is also dumb and naive.
- Kasha (portrayed by Hans Van Cauwenberghe) is a parrot. He is smart and likes to read the newspaper to pass time.
Plopsaland De Panne

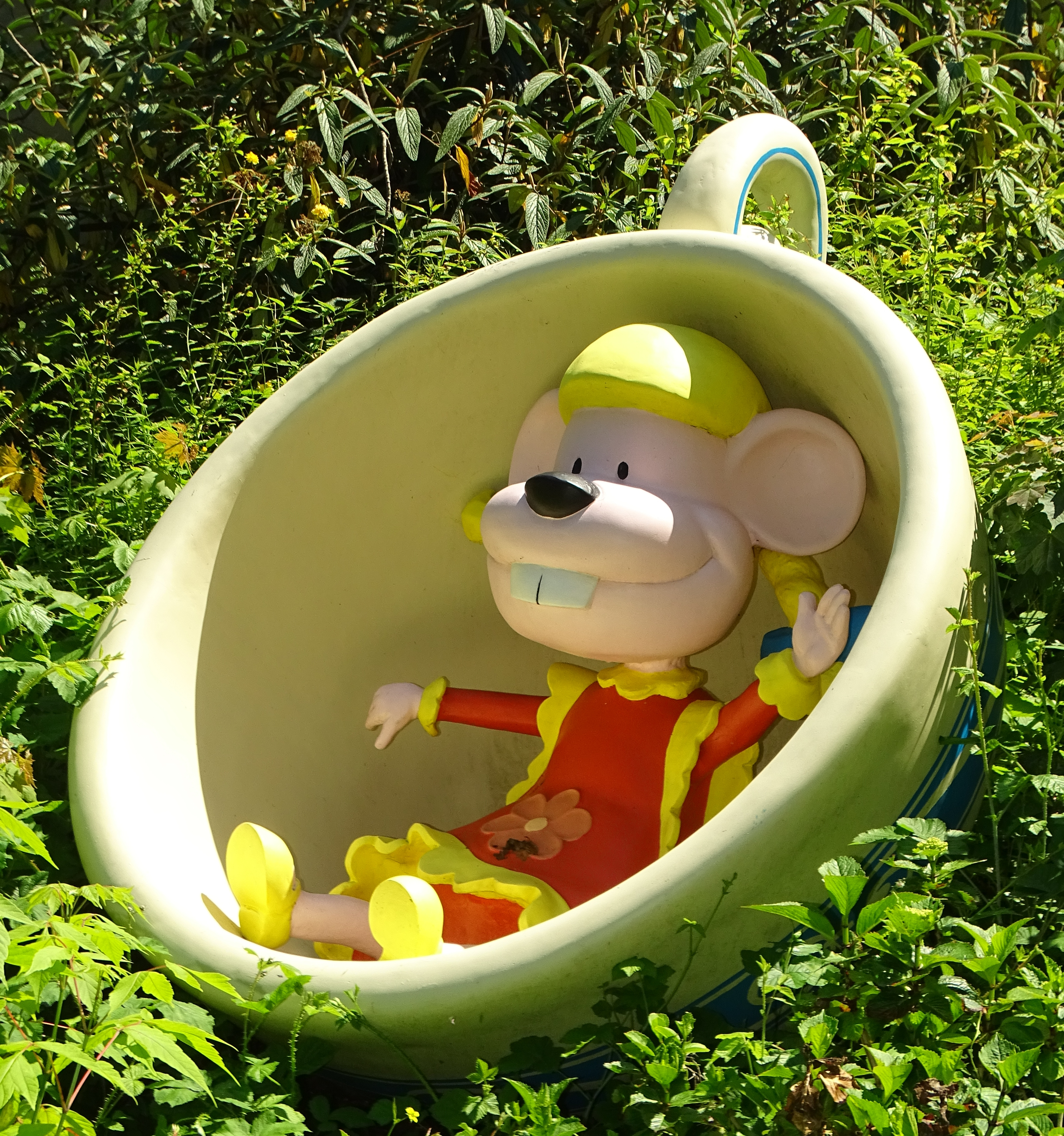
Wizzy

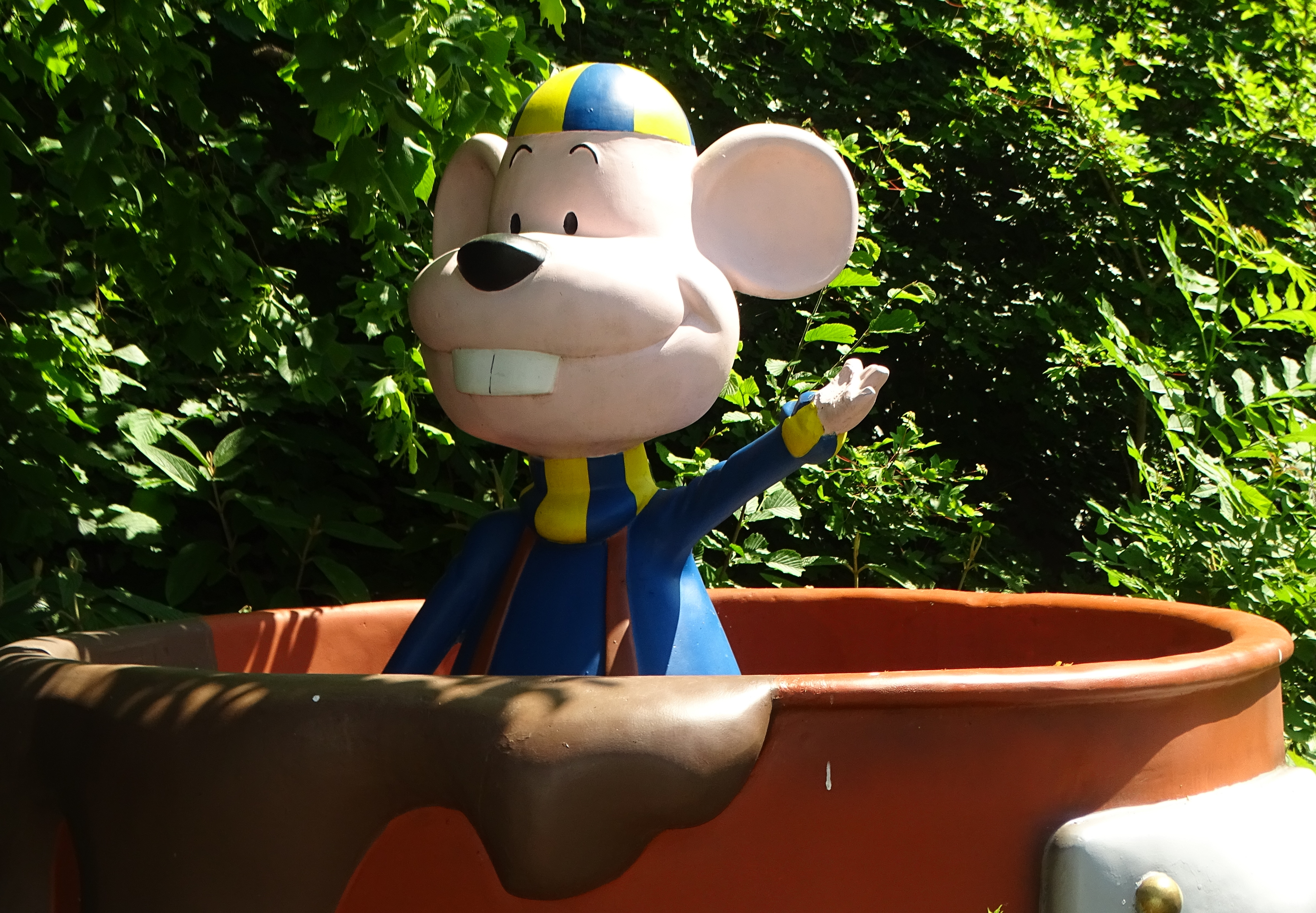
Woppy

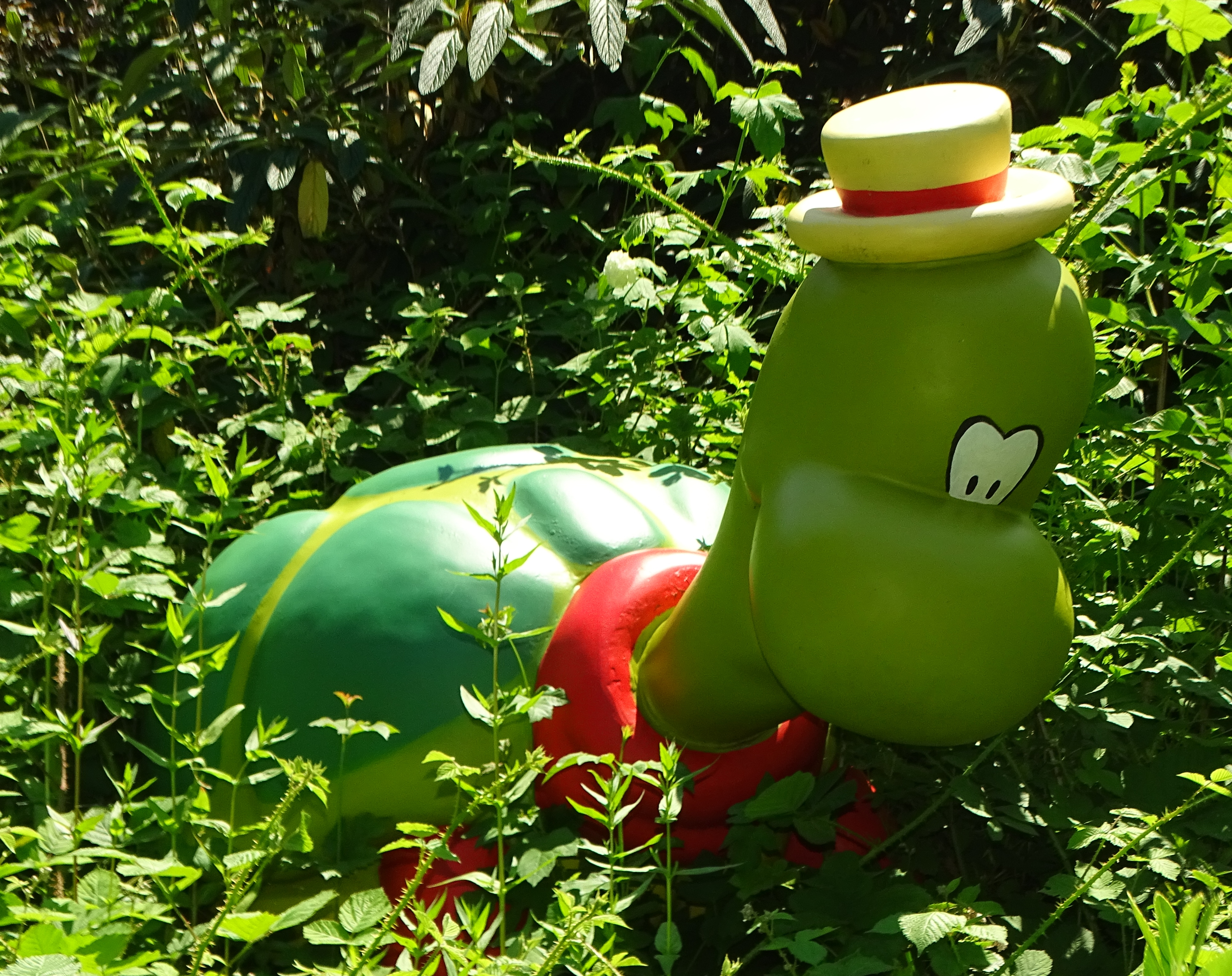
Dongo

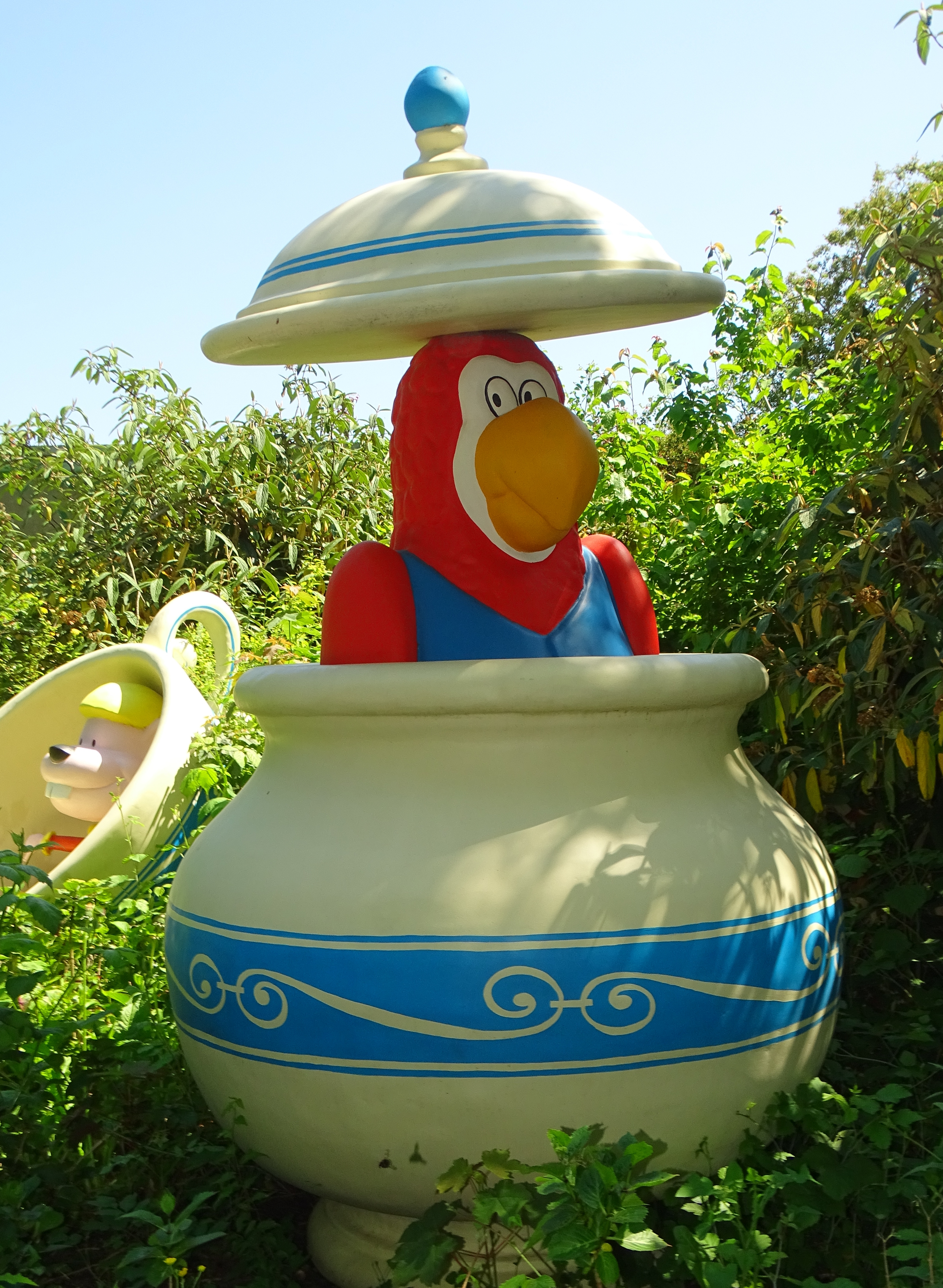
Kasha
