= Familie =

- Genre: Soap opera
- Created by: Herman Verbaet
- Starring: See Current main cast
- Opening theme: Jacky Lafon (1991–1997); Koen Wauters (2001–2009); Charlotte Therssen (2009–2011); Maureen Vanherberghen (2011–2014); Mikaël Ophoff (2014–2017); Eva De Geyter (2014-2017); Stan Van Samang (2017–2019); Niels Destadsbader (2019–2022); Camille D'hont (2022-present)
- Country of origin: Belgium
- No. of seasons: 36
- No. of episodes: 8135+

Production
- Camera setup: Multiple-camera setup
- Running time: 25–35 minutes (with occasional 50-90 minute episodes)
- Production companies: Studio's Amusement (1991-2006); Studio-A / Tv Bastards (2006-2018); Zodiak Belgium (2018-2021); Banijay Belgium (2021-)

Original release
- Network: VTM
- Release: 30 December 1991 – present

Familie (Dutch for Family) is a long-running Flemish television soap opera broadcast on VTM. It is set in Mechelen. Created by Herman Verbaet, Familie was first broadcast on 30 December 1991. It has been broadcast consistently for 5-6 evenings per week, with only 2-3 month hiatuses during summer. It is currently being produced by Banijay Belgium.

== Premise ==
Pierre Van den Bossche and Anna Dierckx have raised three children. Their oldest son Guido is a bright student, eager to become a business mogul. His younger brother Jan and sister Rita are less gifted and often feel pushed back, but are nevertheless proud of their sibling. Once the children are starting their own family lives, shocking news arrives: Anna is pregnant again and Pierre has been diagnosed with a terminal disease. Pierre dies weeks before the birth of his daughter Marleen. Anna is devastated, but decides to stay strong.

=== Start of the series ===
Anna still mourns her deceased husband Pierre, but as she is turning 65 years old she is also happy to see her children are all doing well. Marleen is now a young adult studying at a fashion academy. Guido has successfully founded the VDB Systems electronics company, is married to the eccentric Marie-Rose De Putter and has two children: Peter and Veronique. Jan also works for the company and married to Monique Stevens, he also has two children: Bart and Mieke. Rita has been struggling due to the death of her first son Paul, the illness of her second son Pierrot and the ongoing rivalry with her sister-in-law Marie-Rose, but manages to find happiness in her singing career and her husband Dirk Cockelaere.

=== Development of the main characters ===
Marleen marries school teacher Ben Van der Venne. When she turns out to be infertile, the couple enters a long adoption procedure. On the day little Lovely finally arrives, fate strikes as Marleen gets fatally hit by a car while crossing the street. Ben has a hard time raising Lovely as a single father, but gets close help of Anna and her new live companion Albert. Eventually, Ben signs on for a development project in Africa and takes Lovely with him, after which contact fades. Years later, grown up Lovely comes to spend a couple of years in Belgium and tells her family that Ben has died.

After losing another child, Rita starts suffering a severe alcohol addiction. Dirk leaves her while she is pregnant of their third child, causing Rita to have a mental breakdown and trying to murder Guido and Marie-Rose. Rita ends up in prison, where she gives birth to another son, which she calls Pierrot again. After being released, she marries fellow alcoholic Rob Gerrits, yet both help each other to get their lives back on track. The family embraces her again and keeps a close eye on her, but cannot prevent her from a handful returns to drinking, such as the one following her divorce from Rob. She eventually revives her music career by signing on as a singer and animator on sea cruises. Pierrot grows up to be a very socially committed young man. After a failed career as a street worker, he moves to South America as a development aid.

Guido is a successful and well-respected businessman who founded the family business; VDB Electroonics. Unfortunately his personal life takes quite a few hits, such as his divorce from the adulterous Marie-Rose and the alleged death of their son Peter. Guido survives multiple murder attempts by his professional enemy Didier De Kunst, yet one of those makes him end up in a wheelchair for many years to follow. Luck seems to get back to his side when Peter turns out to be alive, but shortly after this joyful event, Guido dies following a stabbing incident. Peter rises as his father's successor, while Veronique establishes a fashion company. Years after, the two companies merge into a holding in which both siblings maintain management positions. Workaholic Veronique is having a troubled relationship with her son Cedric, who blames her for having neglected him his whole life. Peter's daughter Louise leaves for a sabbatical in Australia before deciding how to start adulthood. Both Peter and Veronique have been married several times. In 2021, Peter becomes father for the second time when his son Victor got born. Unfortunately Victor's mother, Iris Massant, died in a car crash right before Victor was born. In March 2022 both Peter and Marie-Rose die in a house fire and Victor is now being raised by family friends Mathias Moelaert and Vanessa Mariën.

Jan gets married two more times, with Nele Van Winckel and Linda Desmedt, which leads to three more children: Maarten, Leen and Guido Jr, the latter named after Jan's deceased brother. His professional life highlights when he gets appointed mayor, yet after his return to VDB he keeps getting downgraded until he decides to quit and take over the local café. Bart becomes an engineer and has a long run at VDB, while marrying Brenda Vermeir and getting two children: Hannah, who grows up to be a fashion designer for VDB, and Jelle, who wants to become a professional soccer player. After Brenda dies in a car accident, Bart starts a relationship with Peter's ex-wife Trudy Tack de Rixart de Waremme. The couple moves to Dubai, where Bart is pursuing a new career. Mieke spends her first years of adulthood doing development aid in Africa and South America. Back in Belgium, she marries Marc De Waele and gets a son Lennert, but father and son eventually die in a car crash. During her next marriage with Wim Veugelen, she has a miscarriage and becomes infertile. When she starts working as a nurse in the local hospital, she has an affair with one of the doctors, leading to her divorce. Eventually she enters a surprising but successful marriage with the younger Niko Schuurmans. After an accident, she suffers a change in personality, leading her to quit welfare and start a business career at VDB. Maarten becomes a chef and gets his own restaurant, managed by VDB. After the death of his girlfriend Roos, he joins a development program in Asia. Leen becomes a doctor and works in the local hospital for a while, after which she decides to become a general practitioner. A medical suspension after having committed a flight crime, leads her to join a development program in Africa. She takes her son Arthur and boyfriend Faroud Kir with her. Leen is killed in 2024 by family archenemy Bert Van den Bossche. Guido Jr becomes a car mechanic and owns a garage together with one of his former classmates. He and his girlfriend Emma Verdonck get a daughter Mila. Later on, it is revealed that she was switched with another child right after birth, and that a girl named Milou is their real daughter. Guido and Emma meet the girl's father and they agree to co-parent. In 2018 Emma cheats on Guido with the father and they break up.

Back in 2002, Anna discovered that her late husband cheated on her with a German woman during World War II and had fathered a child; Georges Van den Bossche. When Jan goes to Germany to learn more about Georges, he finds out that he died not too long ago and that he also has a child; the shy and introverted Bert Van den Bossche. Jan takes Bert back to Belgium, so he can spend time with his family. In the beginning Anna has trouble accepting Bert as part of the family but eventually welcomes him as well. A few years later, Bert moves to China but comes back to Belgium in 2006. By then, he had turned into a tough and confident business man and later he also starts working for the family business. Though he's very competent, it becomes clear that he doesn't always have the best intentions. He also starts plotting against Peter with the enemy of the family; Xavier Latour. In 2011, Bert gets fired by Peter and by then had already lost much respect with the rest of the family. Bert wants revenge and sets the business on fire during a party, with the intention of killing Peter and the other major shareholders. While everyone survived the fire itself, Bert was caught by Rob and was forced to murder him. Later, Peter discovers that Bert was the arsonist and the one that killed Rob and Bert gets arrested. Anna visits him in prison and tells him he's not longer considered part of the family. This seemingly breaks Bert and tries to commit suicide in his cell, but he doesn't succeed in doing so. In 2013, Bert is still in jail and is out for revenge on the family and Peter in particular. He kills an inmate, steals his identity and manages to escape, but gets arrested again just as he arrives at Peter's apartment. In 2015, Bert escapes jail yet again but this time with the help of Peter's ex June and Bert's henchman Stan Lauwers. Bert wants to flee to Asia, undergo plastic surgery there and then come back as someone else in order to start his big revenge plan. Stan manages to get him on board of a containership to Asia, where he can stay in a container with enough provisions to last the entire trip. Unknowingly to Bert however, Stan double crosses him by making a deal with the captain to dump the container in the ocean. The rest of the family is unaware of this and assumes that Bert has fled to Asia, never to return to Belgium again. In 2021 it was revealed in the Familie spin-off book 'Alter Ego' that Bert turned out to have survived his ordeal on the containership and that he had gone to South-Africa instead to undergo plastic surgery and take on a completely new identity. After having undergone plastic surgery, Bert returns to the family's environment in 2024 under his new identity "Joris Nuyens". By starting to work again for what used to be the family business, Bert slowly comes back into contact with most of his family members that are still living in Belgium, though they are completely unaware that "Joris" is actually Bert. Bert starts his revenge plan and wants to take out all the Van den Bossches one by one. It's also revealed that it was he who was responsible for the deaths of Peter and Marie-Rose two years prior. He hires a sniper to kill Bart Van den Bossche who lives in Dubai, but his plan fails as Bart only sustains a graze wound. Bert reconsiders his plan. He starts a relationship with Mieke, who's still unaware of his intentions and true identity, and suggests to organize a big family reunion. In reality, the reunion is part of his revenge plan. He wants to bring the whole family together in one place so he can kill them all at once by detonating two bombs. A few days prior to the reunion, his plan was almost foiled by Leen, who had discovered his true identity. Bert manages to kill her before she can warn the family and hides her body. In the meantime, Bert has developed a fatherly bond with Peter's daughter Louise and desperately tries to keep her from going to the reunion. He seemingly succeeds but just as he is about to detonate the bombs, Louise arrives anyway and he is forced to cancel the detonation. Instead, he proposes to Mieke and seemingly plans to try his plan again at their wedding in January 2025.

== Current main cast ==
Actor	Character	Duration
Annie Geeraerts	Anna Dierckx	1991–present
Jef De Smedt	Jan Van den Bossche	1991–present
Ray Verhaeghe	Albert Thielens	1992–present
Caroline Maes	Mieke Van den Bossche	2002–present
Margot Hallemans	Hannah Van den Bossche	2006–2009, 2013–present
Peter Bulckaen	Mathias Moelaert	2008–present
Jo Hens	Niko Schuurmans	2009–present
Sandrine André	Veronique Van den Bossche	2012–present
Roel Vanderstukken	Benny Coppens	2012–present
Jasmijn Van Hoof	Stefanie Coppens	2012–2016, 2017–2021, 2024–present
Werner De Smedt	Rudi Verbiest	2013–present
Kürt Rogiers	Lars De Wulf	2016–present
Jaak Van Assche	Alfons Coppens	2016–present
Janine Bisschops	Brigitte De Wulf	2017–present
Yanni Bourgignon	Cédric Moelaert	2017–present
Karen Damen	Vanessa Mariën	2020–present
Charlotte Sieben	Louise Van den Bossche	2021–2025
Maarten Cop	Jelle Van den Bossche	2021–present
Jelle Palmaerts	Emiel Bauwens	2021–present
Belinda Voorspoels	Samira Jibrell	2021–present
Jools Jatta Janssens	Jamila El Moussaoui	2022–present
Amine Boujouh	Brahim El Moussaoui	2022–present
Senne Meynendonckx	Ilja El Moussaoui	2022–present
Cyra Gwynth	† Yoko Daniëls	2022–2025

== Current supporting cast ==
Actor	Character	Duration
Maxime De Winne	Quinten Godderis	2015–2023, 2025–present
Bill Barberis	Linus Vanaken	2024–present
Jan Sobrie	Joris Nuyens	2024–2025
Hugo Sigal	Marcel Lodewijks	2024–present
Bjarne Devolder	Rube Verdonck	2025–present
Sarah Mouhamou	Mona	2025–present
Bert Huysentruyt	Lex Dumont	2025–present

== Former main cast ==
Character	Actor	Duration
Zjef De Mulder	Jan Van den Bosch	2013–2025
Bert Van den Bossche	Steven De Lelie	2006–2011, 2013, 2015, 2024, 2025
Faroud Kir	Begir Memeti	2014–2018, 2024–2025
Guido Van den Bossche	Vincent Banic	2016–2022, 2024, 2025
Maarten Van den Bossche	Michael Vroemans	2006–2013, 2014–2015, 2016, 2018, 2024, 2025
Bart Van den Bossche	Chris Van Tongelen	2001–2015, 2016–2017, 2018, 2019, 2020, 2021, 2022, 2023, 2024, 2025
Rita Van den Bossche	Jacky Lafon	1991–1996, 1997–2015, 2024, 2025
Raven Rodeyns	Aaron Blommaert	2020–2024
† Peter Van den Bossche	Gunther Levi	1999–2022, 2024 (Note: In 2024 Peter only appeared in the web series 'Het ware gelaat van Joris')
† Leen Van den Bossche	Cathérine Kools	2013–2018, 2024
Patrick Pauwels	Ludo Hellinx	2012–2022, 2023
Jenny Versteven	Hilde Van Haesendonck	2014–2022, 2023
Kato Vermeersch	Alix Konadu	2021–2022
† Marie-Rose De Putter	Martine Jonckheere	1991–1998, 2005–2015, 2018–2019, 2021–2022
† Iris Massant	Marianne Devriese	2019–2021
† Jonas Versteven	David Cantens	2018, 2019–2021
Simon Feyaerts	Braam Verreth	2015–2017, 2021
Robyn Versteven	Jits Van Belle	2017–2020, 2020–2021
Amelie De Wulf	Erika Van Tielen	2016–2017, 2017–2020, 2020–2021
Viv Neyskens	Ini Massez	2016–2018, 2021
Liesbeth Pauwels	Hilde De Baerdemaeker	2012–2016, 2017, 2020
Arno Coppens	Arthur Le Boudec	2012–2015, 2015–2016, 2017, 2019, 2020
Emma Verdonck	Bab Buelens	2014–2019
† Marie Devlieger	Lien Van de Kelder	2017–2019
Jelle Van den Bossche	Felix Jamaels	2018–2019
Wout Raaffels	Vincent-Laurent Seys	2016–2018, 2019
† Evy Hermans	Marianne Devriese	2013–2019
Ayo Buhari	Adam Mensah	2018
† Guido Van den Bossche (Senior)	Karel Deruwe	1991–1999, 2018
Louise Van den Bossche	Sarah-Lynn Clerckx	2006–2018
Trudy Tack de Rixart de Waremme	Silvia Claes	1998–2018
Stan Lauwers	Kristof Verhassel	2015–2018
† Wim Veugelen	David Michiels	2006–2009, 2016–2017
Cédric Van de Caveye	Bas Van Weert	2013–2017
Linda Desmet	Hilde Van Wesepoel	2001–2017
Jelle Van den Bossche	Jens Gruyaert	2006–2017
† June Van Damme	Katrien De Becker	2009–2016, 2017
Agnes Moelaert	Monika Dumon	2013–2014, 2014–2016
Guido Van den Bossche	Jelle Florizoone	2015–2016
Guido Van den Bossche	Jordi Rottier	2010–2015
† Thomas Van den Bossche-Feyaerts	Pieter Verelst	2014–2015
Pierrot Van den Bossche	Guillaume Devos	2006–2012, 2013, 2014
Axel De Meester	Bram Van Outryve	2011–2012, 2014
Lovely Van der Venne	Vandana De Boeck	2003–2006, 2013
Evy Hermans	Sofie Truyen	2006–2013
Victor Praet	Robert De La Haye	2009–2013
† Paul Jacobs	Johan De Paepe	2007–2012
Veronique Van den Bossche	Anne Somers	1991–1994, 2001–2012
Hannah Van den Bossche	Ellen Van den Eynde	2009–2012
† Caroline De Meester	Kadèr Gürbüz	2011–2012
† Rob Gerrits	Erik Goris	1998–2011
Mario Van de Caveye	Patrick Vandersande	2003–2011
† Brenda Vermeir	Vicky Versavel	1997–2001, 2002–2011
Leen Van den Bossche	Ruth Bastiaensen	2006–2011
Morgane Maes	Tine Laureyns	2009–2010
Els D'hollander	Kristine Perpête	1997–2009, 2010
Malika Van Gils	Sophie Van Everdingen	2009–2010
† Xavier Latour	Eric Kerremans	2003–2009
† Christel Feremans	Ingrid Van Rensbergen	2001–2009
Suzy Mariën	Nele Snoeck	2005–2009
Kobe Dierckx	Stoffel Bollu	2003–2009
Guy Maeterlinck	Luk De Koninck	1999–2007
Eline Vaerenbergh	Lulu Aertgeerts	2005–2007
† Andreas Mitsides	Kristoff Clerckx	2003–2007
René D'hollander	Dirk Meynendonckx	1997–2007
Heidi Janssens	Helga Van der Heyden	2003–2006
Leen Van den Bossche	Saskia Raë	1996–2006
Maarten Van den Bossche	Gianni Verschueren	1997–2006
Pierrot Van den Bossche	Kristof Van de Vondel	1995–2006
† Walter Dierckx	Guido Horckmans	1991–2006
† Marc De Waele	Jeron Amin Dewulf	2003–2006
Koen Lamoen	Geert Hunaerts	2000–2006
† Annemarie Govaert	Brigitte De Man	2003–2005
Tinne Huysmans	Veva De Blauwe	2000–2004
Bert Van den Bossche	Mout Uyttersprot	2002–2004
† Sarah De Kunst	Els Meeus	2000–2003
† Thomas Maeterlinck	Bert Vannieuwenhuyse	1999–2003
Eric Bervoets	Stephane Croughs	2002–2003
Nele Van Winckel	Hermine Selleslagh	1994–2003
† Jo Bervoets	Jan Schepens	2001–2002
† Monique Stevens	Riet Van Gool	1991–2002
† Cathérine Misotten	An Nelissen	2000–2002
† Vincent Misotten	Hugo Van den Berghe	1999–2001
Veroniue Van den Bossche	Ann-Christine Hendrickx	1996–2001
† Didier De Kunst	Ronny Waterschoot	1993–1999, 2001
† Bertje Baetens	Marc Lauwrys	2000–2001
Henk Terjonck	Dieter Troubleyn	1994–2001
† Femke Maeterlinck	Stéphanie Meire	1999–2001
Bart Van den Bossche	Wim Van de Velde	1997–2000
Mieke Van den Bossche	Lieselotte Mariën	1991–1994, 1995–2000
Noortje Moortgat	Veerle De Jonghe	1997–1999
† Babette Van Tichelen	Bieke Ilegems	1992–1999
† Rikkert Moortgat	Remco Van Damme	1997–1999
† Lieve Vleugels	Lieve Desloovere	1997–1999
Lenka Wuytack	Petra Winckelmans	1995–1998
† Hugo Beckers	Hans Royaards	1994–1998
Manou Van Steen	Tania Kloek	1993–1997
Michel	Yves Michiels	1995–1997
Bart Van den Bossche	Christophe Du Jardin	1991–1997
† François Van den Bossche	Bob Stijnen	1992–1996
† Claire De Ruyter	Nora Tilley	1994–1996
Sarah De Kunst	Debbie Schneider	1994–1996
Peter Van den Bossche	Erik Goossens	1991–1995
Alex Le Croix	Donald Madder	1994–1995
Liliane Faes	Liliane Raeymaekers	1993–1994
† Simonne Vercauteren	Nini Van der Auwera	1992–1994
† Ben Van der Venne	Ben Rottiers	1992–1994
† Marleen Van den Bossche	Hilde De Roeck	1991–1993
† Pierrot Cockelaere	Steve Mees	1991–1992

== Episodes ==
Season	Airdates	Episode numbers	Amount of episodes
1	30 December 1991 – 29 May 1992	1 – 110	110
2	31 August 1992 – 8 May 1993	111 – 290	180
3	30 August 1993 – 28 May 1994	291 – 507	217
4	5 September 1994 – 27 May 1995	508 – 735	228
5	28 August 1995 – 1 June 1996	736 – 975	240
6	2 September 1996 – 30 May 1997	976 – 1208	233
7	1 September 1997 – 30 May 1998	1209 – 1442	234
8	31 August 1998 – 29 May 1999	1443 – 1676	234
9	30 August 1999 – 6 June 2000	1677 – 1918	242
10	28 August 2000 – 29 June 2001	1919 – 2181	263
11	3 September 2001 – 28 June 2002	2182 – 2421	240
12	2 September 2002 – 27 June 2003	2422 – 2636	215
13	1 September 2003 – 27 June 2004	2637 – 2852	216
14	30 August 2004 – 26 June 2005	2853 – 3112	260
15	29 August 2005 – 30 June 2006	3113 – 3375	263
16	4 September 2006 – 29 June 2007	3376 – 3632	257
17	3 September 2007 – 27 June 2008	3633 – 3889	257
18	1 September 2008 – 26 June 2009	3890 – 4146	257
19	31 August 2009 – 25 June 2010	4147 – 4403	257
20	30 August 2010 – 24 June 2011	4404 – 4660	257
21	22 August 2011 – 29 June 2012	4661 – 4885	225
22	27 August 2012 – 28 June 2013	4886 – 5105	220
23	26 August 2013 – 27 June 2014	5106 – 5325	220
24	25 August 2014 – 26 June 2015	5326 – 5545	220
25	24 August 2015 – 29 June 2016	5546 – 5768	223
26	29 August 2016 – 30 June 2017	5769 – 5988	220
27	28 August 2017 – 29 June 2018	5989 – 6208	220
28	27 August 2018 – 28 June 2019	6209 – 6428	220
29	26 August 2019 – 24 April 2020	6429 – 6603	175
30	24 August 2020 – 25 June 2021	6604 – 6823	220
31	23 August 2021 – 24 June 2022	6824 – 7043	220
32	29 August 2022 – 23 June 2023	7044 – 7258	215
33	28 August 2023 – 28 June 2024	7259 – 7477	219
34	26 August 2024 – 27 June 2025	7478 – 7695	218
35	25 August 2025 – 26 June 2026	7696 – 7915	220
36	24 August 2026 – 25 June 2027	7916 – 8135	220

== Guinness book of records 2026 ==
In 2026 the soap grabbed three worldwide records:

- Ray Verhaeghe is the oldest actor in a soapserie.
- Annie Geeraerts is the oldest actress in a soapserie.
- The characters Albert Thielens and Anna Dierckx (played respectively by Verhaeghe and Geeraerts) are the oldest couple in a soap.
