= 1999 in Belgium =

- Decades: 1970s; 1980s; 1990s; 2000s; 2010s
- See also: Other events of 1999; List of years in Belgium

Events from the year 1999 in Belgium

== Incumbents ==
- Monarch: Albert II
- Prime Minister: Jean-Luc Dehaene (to 12 July); Guy Verhofstadt (from 12 July)

== Events ==
- 1 January – The Euro Currency officially entered circulation in the European Union (EU) Eurozone member area countries, then formally make its debut on European and the world financial markets.
- May – Dioxin affair comes to light
- 13 June – 1999 Belgian federal election
- 12 July – Verhofstadt I Government sworn in
- 2 August – Yaguine Koita and Fodé Tounkara discovered dead at Brussels Airport
- 4 December – Wedding of Prince Philippe and Mathilde d'Udekem d'Acoz

== Publications ==
- Amélie Nothomb, Stupeur et tremblements (winner of the 1999 Grand Prix du roman de l'Académie française)
- Philippe Roberts-Jones, Brussels: Fin de Siècle (Cologne: Taschen)
- Robert Stallaerts, Historical Dictionary of Belgium (Lanham, Md.: Scarecrow Press)
- Marianne Thys and René Michelems, Belgian Cinema = Le Cinéma Belge = De Belgische Film (Brussels, Royal Belgian Film Archive)
- Raymond van Uytven, Studies over Brabantse kloostergeschiedenis (Brussels: Algemeen Rijksarchief, 1999)

== Births ==
- 2 August – Emma Bale, singer
- 27 August – Mile Svilar, footballer

== Deaths ==
- 22 January – Paul Cammermans (born 1921), film maker
- 20 February – Frans Grootjans (born 1922), politician
- 16 August – Paul Serruys (born 1912), missionary
- 10 September – Michèle Fabien (born 1945), writer
- 29 November – Andrée Grandjean (born 1910), resister
- 17 December – Henri Storck (born 1907), film maker
