= 2004 in Belgium =

- Decades: 1980s; 1990s; 2000s; 2010s; 2020s
- See also: Other events of 2004; List of years in Belgium

This article details events occurring in the year 2004 in Belgium. Major events include a gas explosion in Ghislenghien, which killed 24 people, and the restructuring of the Vlaams Blok political party.

== Incumbents ==
- Monarch: Albert II
- Prime Minister: Guy Verhofstadt

== Events ==
- 1 March – Marc Dutroux brought to trial.
- 22 March – Marc Dutroux sentenced to life imprisonment.
- 24 April – Sporting Anderlecht wins the Belgian First Division
- 30 July – Gas explosion in Ghislenghien, Hainaut, causes 24 deaths.
- 21 August – Justine Henin wins the Olympic final against French tennis player Amélie Mauresmo, earning the gold medal
- 29 August – Kimi Räikkönen wins the 2004 Belgian Grand Prix at the Circuit de Spa-Francorchamps.
- 25 October – Patrick Hoogmartens succeeds Paul Schruers as Bishop of Hasselt
- 14 November – Flemish political party Vlaams Blok dissolves and rebrands as Vlaams Belang.
- 26 December – 12 Belgians are among the victims of the 2004 Indian Ocean tsunami.

== Publications ==
- Xavier Mabille, Histoire politique de la Belgique: Facteurs et acteurs de changement (Brussels, C.R.I.S.P.).

== Art and architecture ==
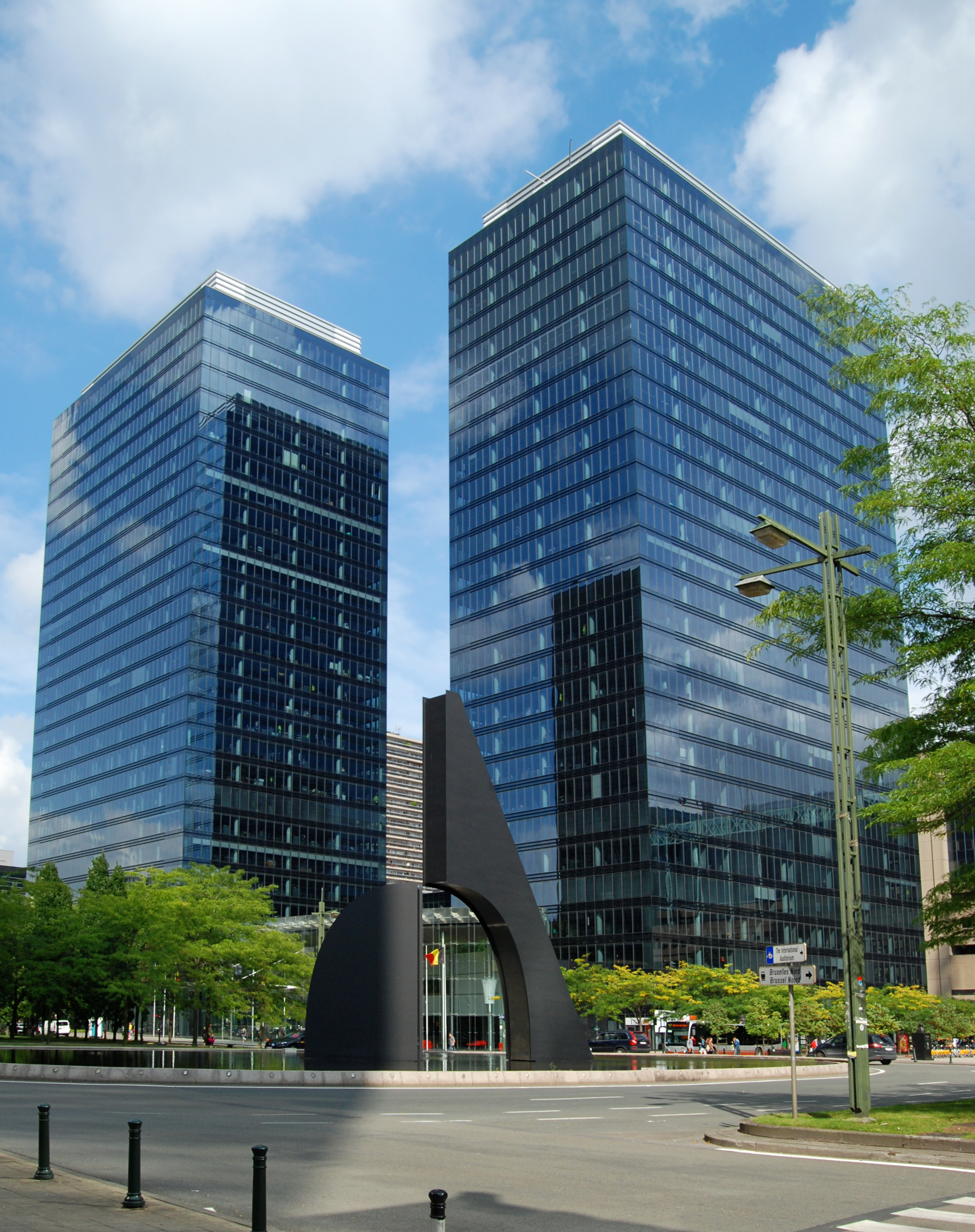
North Galaxy Towers, Schaerbeek

Buildings

- Ethias Arena opens in Hasselt
- North Galaxy Towers in Brussels completed (begun 2002)

== Births ==
- 6 January – Roméo Lavia, footballer
- 6 February – Princess Louise of Belgium
- 2 March – Evy Poppe, snowboarder
- 13 October – Ben Mertens, snooker player

== Deaths ==
January

- 1 January – Jean-Pierre Hallet, anthropologist and human rights activist.
- 7 January – Leonce-Albert Van Peteghem, bishop
- 28 January – André Van Lysebeth, yoga instructor

February

- 2 February – Arthur Gilson, politician
- 7 February – Leopold Maertens
- 9 February – Mechtilde van Mechelen, actress
- 11 February – Ugo Prinsen, actor
- 13 February – Jan De Laender, psychologist and journalist
- 21 February – John Taylor, politician

March

- 13 March – Roger Nols, mayor
- 14 March – Petrus Weemaels, composer
- 17 March – Jan Van Der Auwera, soccer player

April

- 2 April – Guillaume Marie van Zuylen, bishop
- 4 April – Briek Schotte, cyclist
- 5 April – Fernand Goyvaerts, soccer player

May

- 3 May – Marc Mortier, entrepreneur
- 5 May – Marc Scheers, TV producer
- 16 May – Omer Grawet, journalist and news reporter
- 18 May – Rik Hamblok, abstract painter
- 26 May – Frans Buyens, film and TV-director

June

- 7 June – Karel Biddeloo comic book creator
- 15 June
  - Maurits Sabbe, priest and theologian
  - Denise Zimmerman, actress
- 20 June – Stive Vermaut, cyclist

July

- 3 July – Freddy de Vree, poet
- 8 July – Emile Brichard, cyclist
- 27 July – Léon Hurez, politician

August

- 2 August – François Craenhals, comic book writer
- 10 August – Remi Piryns
- 31 August — Jean-Marie Ghuysen, chemist

September

- 5 September – Cecil de Strycker, economist and banker
- 9 September – Hein Beniest, film director
- 16 September – Cyrillus-Camillus Barbary, First World War veteran
- 26 September – Tim Pauwels, cyclist
- 30 September – Fernand Terby conductor

== See also ==
- 2004 in Belgian television
