= 2001 in Belgium =

- Decades: 1980s; 1990s; 2000s; 2010s; 2020s
- See also: Other events of 2001; List of years in Belgium

Events from the year 2001 in Belgium

== Incumbents ==
- Monarch: Albert II
- Prime Minister: Guy Verhofstadt

== Events ==
- March 27 - A train collision in Pécrot, Walloon Brabant causes 8 fatalities.
- April 28 - Popular amusement park Walibi Waver reopens as Six Flags Belgium.
- June 3 - Aloys Jousten consecrated as bishop of Liège
- July 16 - Belgian Jacques Rogge elected President of the International Olympic Committee.
- September 11 - One Belgian dies in the September 11 attacks on the World Trade Center in New York City: Patrice Braut, killed on the 94th floor.
- November 6 - National airline company Sabena is declared bankrupt by the commercial court.

== Publications ==
- Philippe Bragard and Vincent Bruch, Namur: une citadelle européenne (Namur, Les Amis de la Citadelle de Namur)
- Raymond van Uytven, Production and Consumption in the Low Countries, 13th-16th Centuries (Aldershot, Ashgate Publishing)

== Art and architecture ==
- 21 January to 22 April – Exhibition Pride and Joy: Children's Portraits in The Netherlands 1500-1700 held at Royal Museum of Fine Arts Antwerp.

== Births ==
- 27 February – Largie Ramazani, Belgian footballer
- 10 March – Charles De Ketelaere, Belgian footballer
- 25 October – Princess Elisabeth, eldest child of Philippe of Belgium (then Duke of Brabant)

== Deaths ==
January

- January 1 - Remi Capoen (84), cyclist
- January 7 - Robert Hurbain (72), businessman
- January 8 - Paul Vanden Boeynants (81), politician
- January 11 - Maurits Goossens (86), actor
- January 19 - Pierre Soubry (69), businessman
- January 26 - Eric Rijckaert (57), doctor
- January 27 - Marie José of Belgium (94), Belgian princess and last Queen of Italy
- January 31 - Renaat Braem (90), architect

February

- February 22 - Piet Bergers (93), actor

March

- March 5 - Evrard de Limburg Stirum (73), mayor
- March 5 - Frans De Mulder (63), cyclist
- March 16 - Brasser (64), cartoonist

April

- April 5 – Simone Dubois (90), translator

May

- May 3 - Ward Schroeven (88), athlete
- May 14 - Eugeen Uten (81), carillonneur and composer

June

- June 3 - Jean-Pierre De Decker (56), film director
- June 15 - Hurey (63), cartoonist
- June 29 - Donald Madder (32), actor
- June 30 - Pol Appeltants (79), soccer-player

July

- July 8 - Kees Brug (78), singer and comedian
- July 12 - Jacques Vercruysse (71), athlete
- July 16 - Morris (77), cartoonist

August

- August 3 - Leo De Kesel (97), cleric
- August 18 - Roland Cardon (72), composer and conductor
- August 19 - Henri-François Van Aal (68), journalist and politician
- August 21 - Alfred Scokaert (80), mayor
- August 24 - Bernard Heuvelmans (84), zoologist
- August 29 - Jacques Santkin (52), politician

September

- September 7 - Georges Mundeleer (80), politician
- September 8 - Paul Ooghe (102), last surviving Belgian soldier from World War 1
- September 26 - Albert Tiberghien (86), tax consultant

October

- October 1 - Alfons Borgers (82), mathematician
- October 15 - Lieve Baeten (46), children book writer

November

- November 15 - Robert Vanes (78), businessman and professor
- November 24 - Eddy Meeùs (75), entrepreneur, founder Walibi

December

- December 1 - Taf Wallet (99), painter and engraver
- December 15 - Paul Devlies (79), politician
- December 22 - Pierre Cosemyns (71), boxer
- December 22 - Angèle Durand (76), singer and actress
- December 26 - Staf Permentier (81), comedian
- December 29 - Louis Waltniel (76), politician
- December 30 - Chaim Kreiswirth (83), Polish-Belgian rabbi

== See also ==
- 2001 in Belgian television
