= 1787 in Belgium =

- Decades
- See also: Other events of 1787; List of years in Belgium

Events in the year 1787 in the Austrian Netherlands and Prince-bishopric of Liège (predecessor states of modern Belgium).

== Incumbents ==
=== Habsburg Netherlands ===
Monarch – Joseph II

Governors General – Maria Christina of Austria-Lorraine with Albert Casimir of Saxony

Minister Plenipotentiary – Ludovico di Belgiojoso; Sir Joseph Murray (acting, 19 July to 27 October); Ferdinand von Trauttmansdorff

=== Prince-Bishopric of Liège ===
Prince-Bishop – César-Constantin-François de Hoensbroeck

== Events ==
- 1 January – Joseph II, Holy Roman Emperor, decrees the abolition of existing law courts and the institution of new law courts for the Duchy of Brabant, to take effect from 1 May 1787, and a General Council of Government.
- 29 January – States of Brabant, meeting in Brussels, admonish the Emperor that the Joyous Entry cannot be unilaterally altered.
- 20 April – Council of Brabant declares its own abolition unconstitutional.
- 23 April – Henri Van der Noot presents his "Mémoire sur les droits du peuple brabançon" to the States of Brabant.
- 26 April – States of Brabant refuse to vote taxes until their grievances are addressed.
- 28 May – Governors General Maria Christina and Albert suspend implementation of Joseph II's reforms.
- 4 June – Guilds of Brussels assemble to enroll militiamen.
- 19 July – Ludovico di Belgiojoso recalled as minister plenipotentiary; replaced as acting minister by Sir Joseph Murray
- July and August – First public disturbances that will become the Brabant Revolution.
- 20 September – Fighting between Austrian troops and citizen militiamen in Brussels.
- 21 September – Joseph II's interim minister plenipotentiary, Sir Joseph Murray, suspends the abolition of the Council of Brabant.
- 27 October – Ferdinand von Trauttmansdorff arrives as minister plenipotentiary.
- 17 December – Joseph II issues three new reform edicts.

== Publications ==
- François-Xavier de Feller, Catéchisme philosophique ou Recueil d'observations propres a défendre la religion chrétienne contre ses ennemis (revised edition; Liège)
- Charles Lambert d'Outrepont, Considérations sur la constitution des duchés de Brabant et de Limbourg.

== Art and architecture ==
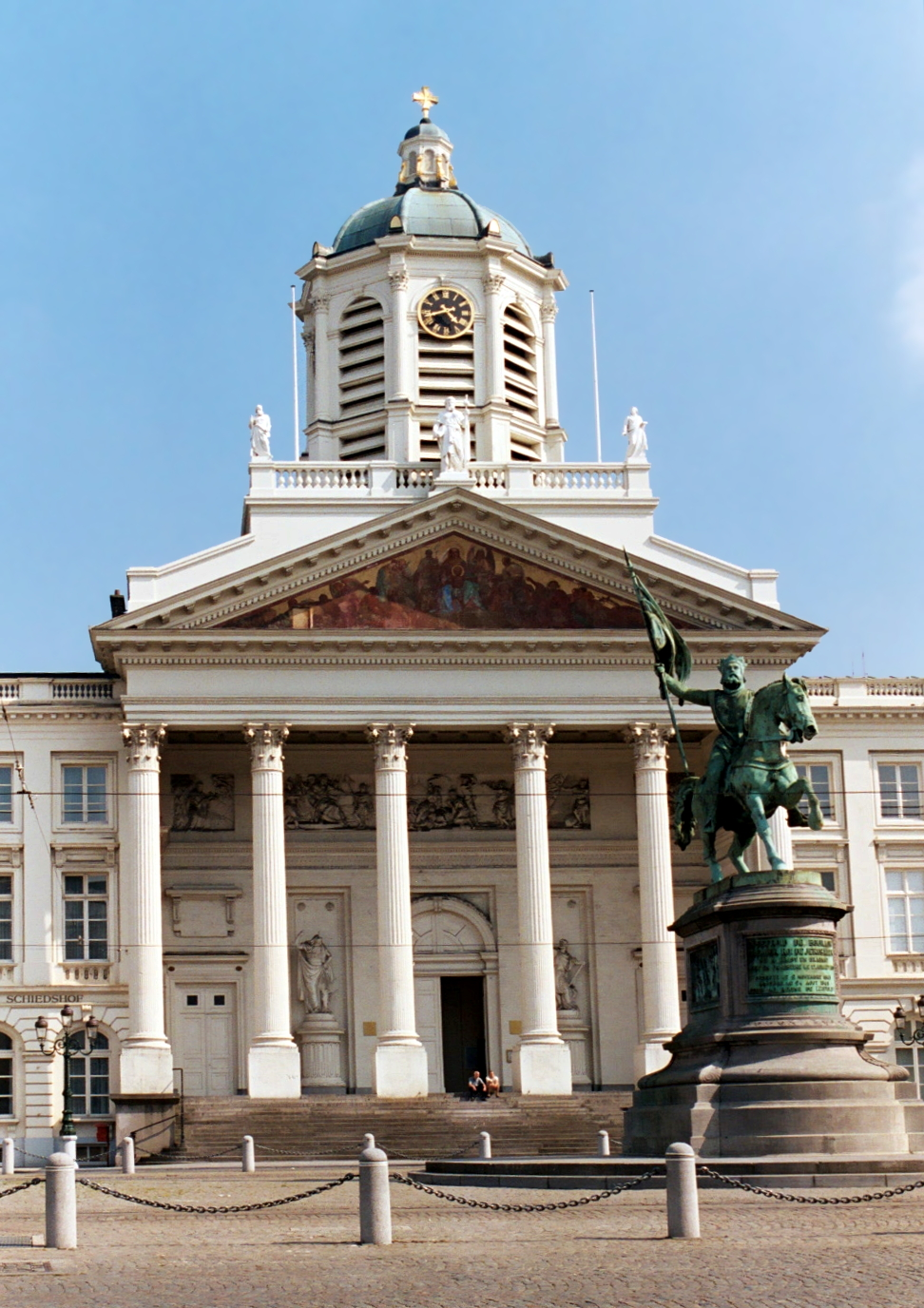
Church of St. James on Coudenberg, Brussels

Buildings

- Church of St. James on Coudenberg in Brussels

== Births ==
- 28 April – Jean-Joseph Raikem, politician (died 1875)
- 30 April – Charles d'Hane de Steenhuyze, politician (died 1858)
- 16 November – François-Joseph Navez, painter (died 1869)
- 3 December
  - Eduard de Lannoy, composer (died 1853)
  - Philippe Veranneman de Watervliet, mayor of Bruges (died 1844)

== Deaths ==
- 20 May – Jean Des Roches (born 1740), scholar
