= 1994 in Belgium =

- Decades: 1970s; 1980s; 1990s; 2000s; 2010s
- See also: Other events of 1994; List of years in Belgium

Events from the year 1994 in Belgium

== Incumbents ==
- Monarch: Albert II
- Prime Minister: Jean-Luc Dehaene

== Events ==
- 10 to 11 January – NATO summit in Brussels
- 7 April – Murder of 10 Belgian peacekeepers at the beginning of the Rwandan genocide
- 9 October – Provincial and municipal elections
- 31 December – Switel Hotel fire in Antwerp

== Publications ==
- Michel Biron, La modernité belge: littérature et société (Brussels: Éditions Labor; Montréal: Presses de l'Université de Montréal)
- H. Kinable, Drugsgebruikers en AIDS (Report on AIDS prevention among injecting drug users in Flanders)

== Art and architecture ==
Buildings

- Sint-Pieters-Leeuw Tower ciompleted, tallest free-standing building in Belgium

Cinema

- Taxandria, directed by Raoul Servais

== Births ==
- 12 February - Kemal Bilmez, politician
- 25 July – Jordan Lukaku, footballer
- 19 August – Nafissatou Thiam, athlete
- 4 December – Leandro Trossard, footballer

== Deaths ==
- 1 April – Léon Degrelle (born 1906), Nazi collaborator
- 20 July – Paul Delvaux (born 1897), painter
- 26 November – Omer Vanaudenhove (born 1913), politician
- 15 December – Joseph Donceel (born 1906), Jesuit
