= 1993 in Belgium =

- Decades: 1970s; 1980s; 1990s; 2000s; 2010s
- See also: Other events of 1993; List of years in Belgium

Events from the year 1993 in Belgium

== Incumbents ==
- Monarch: Baudouin (until 31 July); Albert II (from 9 August)
- Prime Minister: Jean-Luc Dehaene

== Events ==
January

- 20 January – Kidnapping of Ulrika Bidegård

February

- 6 February – Revision of the Constitution of Belgium signed into law

May

- 15 May – Barbara Dex represents Belgium at the Eurovision Song Contest 1993

June

- 6 June – Standard Liège wins the Belgian Cup at the Constant Vanden Stock Stadium

July

- 31 July – Death of King Baudouin

August

- 9 August – Albert II sworn in as King, following the death of his brother Baudouin, on 31 July

== Publications ==
- M. Leroy, De la Belgique unitaire à l'Etat fédéral (Brussels, Bruylant).

== Births ==
- 29 March – Thorgan Hazard, footballer
- 13 April – Daan Myngheer, cyclist (died 2016)
- 9 May – Rachel Sobry, politician
- 13 May – Romelu Lukaku, footballer
- 1 June – Noémie Happart, model
- 4 September – Yannick Carrasco, footballer
- 2 October – Michy Batshuayi, footballer

== Deaths ==
- 12 January – Pierre Nihant (born 1925), cyclist
- 3 February

Éliane de Meuse (born 1899), painter
Karel Goeyvaerts (born 1923), composer

- 23 February – Robert Triffin (born 1911), economist
- 21 March – Albert Ramon (born 1920), cyclist
- 10 July – Alfred Hamerlinck (born 1905), cyclist
- 31 July – Baudouin of Belgium (born 1930), monarch
- 21 September – Fernand Ledoux (born 1897), actor
- 22 November – Alois De Hertog (born 1927), cyclist
- 29 November – Arnold Boghaert (born 1920), bishop
- 3 December – Henricus Cockuyt (born 1903), Olympic sprinter
- 20 December – Hubert Deltour, (born 1911), cyclist
