= 1996 in Belgium =

- Decades: 1970s; 1980s; 1990s; 2000s; 2010s
- See also: Other events of 1996; List of years in Belgium

Events from the year 1996 in Belgium

== Incumbents ==
- Monarch: Albert II
- Prime Minister: Jean-Luc Dehaene

== Events ==
- 27 February – A multiple-vehicle collision occurred on the E17 near Nazareth, with 10 deaths the worst traffic accident in Belgium
- 13 August – Child-murderer Marc Dutroux arrested
- 20 October – White March: approximately 300,000 people demonstrate to protest police and judicial inefficiency and demand improved child protection in the wake of the Dutroux affair.

== Publications ==
- David A. Boileau, Cardinal Mercier: A Memoir (Peeters)
- A. G. Papadopoulos, Urban Regimes and Strategies: Building Europe's Central Executive District in Brussels (University of Chicago Press)

== Births ==
- July 14 - Anas Hamzaoui, footballer
- November 13 - Kyara Linskens, basketball player

== Deaths ==
- 6 May – Leo Joseph Suenens (born 1904), cardinal
- 19 May – Charles Verlinden (born 1907), historian
- 29 September – Albert Ayguesparse (born 1900), writer
