= 2006 in Belgium =

- Decades: 1980s; 1990s; 2000s; 2010s; 2020s
- See also: Other events of 2006; List of years in Belgium

This article lists some of the events that took place in Belgium in 2006.

== Incumbents ==
- Monarch: Albert II
- Prime Minister: Guy Verhofstadt

== Events ==
- 22 to 26 March – 2006 World University Cycling Championship takes place in Antwerp/Herentals: The Netherlands wins the overall medal table. Ellen van Dijk is the best cyclist with 1 gold and 1 silver medal.
- 12 April – Murder of Joe Van Holsbeeck
- 9 September – 50th Gordon Bennett Cup held in Waasmunster.
- 8 October – Provincial and municipal elections

== Deaths ==
- 27 March – Madeleine Scrève (born 1912), fencer
- 3 April – Michel Delire (born 1933), footballer
- 12 April – Joe Van Holsbeeck, teenage murder victim
- 14 June – Jean Roba (born 1930), comics author
- 29 June – Philibert Mees (born 1929), composer and pianist
- 4 July – Norbert Kerckhove (born 1932), cyclist
- 6 July – Piet Van Brabant (born 1932), journalist
- 5 August – Hugo Schiltz (born 1927), politician
- 16 August – Julien Schepens (born 1935), cyclist
- 4 September – Rémy Belvaux (born 1966), film maker
- 6 October – Louis Van Schill (born 1921), cyclist
- 25 November – Jules Deneumoulin (born 1910), canoeist
- 8 December – Albert De Coninck (born 1915), communist
- 30 December – Renaat Bosschaert (born 1938), artist

== See also ==
- 2006 in Belgian television
