= 1995 in Belgium =

- Decades: 1970s; 1980s; 1990s; 2000s; 2010s
- See also: Other events of 1995; List of years in Belgium

Events from the year 1995 in Belgium

== Incumbents ==
- Monarch: Albert II
- Prime Minister: Jean-Luc Dehaene

== Events ==
- 21 May – 1995 Belgian federal election
- June – Pope John Paul II visits Belgium.

== Publications ==
- Filip Reyntjens, Rwanda: trois jours qui ont fait basculer l'histoire (Brussels, Institut Africain)
- Raoul Van Caenegem, An Historical Introduction to Western Constitutional Law (Cambridge University Press)

== Births ==
- 5 February – Adnan Januzaj, footballer
- 8 March – Luca Brecel, snooker player
- 18 April – Divock Origi, footballer
- 17 November – Elise Mertens, tennis player

== Deaths ==
- 10 August — Leo Apostel (born 1925), philosopher
