= 2005 in Belgium =

- Decades: 1980s; 1990s; 2000s; 2010s; 2020s
- See also: Other events of 2005; List of years in Belgium

This article details events from the year 2005 in Belgium. Major events include the holding of the Junior Eurovision Song Contest in Belgium, and the appointment of Belgium's first female rabbi.

== Incumbents ==
- Monarch: Albert II
- Prime Minister: Guy Verhofstadt

== Events ==
- 15 May – Club Brugge win the Belgian Pro League.
- 1 June – Marcel Smets becomes the 2nd Vlaams Bouwmeester succeeding Bob van Reeth.
- 6 July – The Flemish parliament approves a municipality decree, redefining the role and powers of local governments.
- 11 September – Belgium gets its first female rabbi: Floriane Chinsky accepts her appointment in the new synagogue of Forest.
- 28 September – Kenyan Samson Kosgei wins the Brussels Marathon in a time of 2:12.01.
- 11 October – The Verhofstadt II Government proposes the Generatiepact to parliament.
- 26 November – The third Junior Eurovision Song Contest is held in Hasselt
- Undated
  - Financial Intelligence & Processing firm is established.

== Publications ==
- Sabine Dardenne, I Choose to Live (London, Virago Press)

== Births ==
- 4 October – Prince Emmanuel of Belgium
- 13 December
  - Prince Aymeric of Belgium
  - Prince Nicolas of Belgium

== Deaths ==
- 24 March – René Derolez (born 1921), philologist
- 24 May – Arthur Haulot, (born 1913), journalist
- 1 August – Yvette Cauquil-Prince (born 1928), weaver
- 15 August – Adriaan Pattin (born 1914), historian of medieval philosophy

== See also ==
- 2005 in Belgian television
