= 1997 in Belgium =

- Decades: 1970s; 1980s; 1990s; 2000s; 2010s
- See also: Other events of 1997; List of years in Belgium

Events from the year 1997 in Belgium

== Incumbents ==
- Monarch: Albert II
- Prime Minister: Jean-Luc Dehaene

== Events ==
- 27 February – Closure of Vilvoorde Renault Factory announced, with a loss of 3,100 jobs, inspiring the following year's Procédure Renault, a new consultation procedure for mass redundancies.

== Publications ==
- Els De Bens, De pers in België. Het verhaal van de Belgische dagbladpers: Gisteren, vandaag en morgen
- Bianca Booms and Jean-Paul Wydoodt, Alcohol, illegale drugs en medicatie: Recente ontwikkelingen in Vlaanderen, 1996.

== Births ==
- 1 July – Eléonor Sana, skier
- 15 October – Romanie Schotte, Miss Belgium 2017
- 30 September – Max Verstappen, racing driver and the 2021 Formula One World Champion

== Deaths ==
- 5 January – André Franquin (born 1924), comics artist
- 19 January – Robert-Joseph Mathen (born 1916), bishop
- 15 June – Edmond Leburton (born 1915), prime minister
