= 2007 in Belgium =

- Decades: 1980s; 1990s; 2000s; 2010s; 2020s
- See also: Other events of 2007; List of years in Belgium

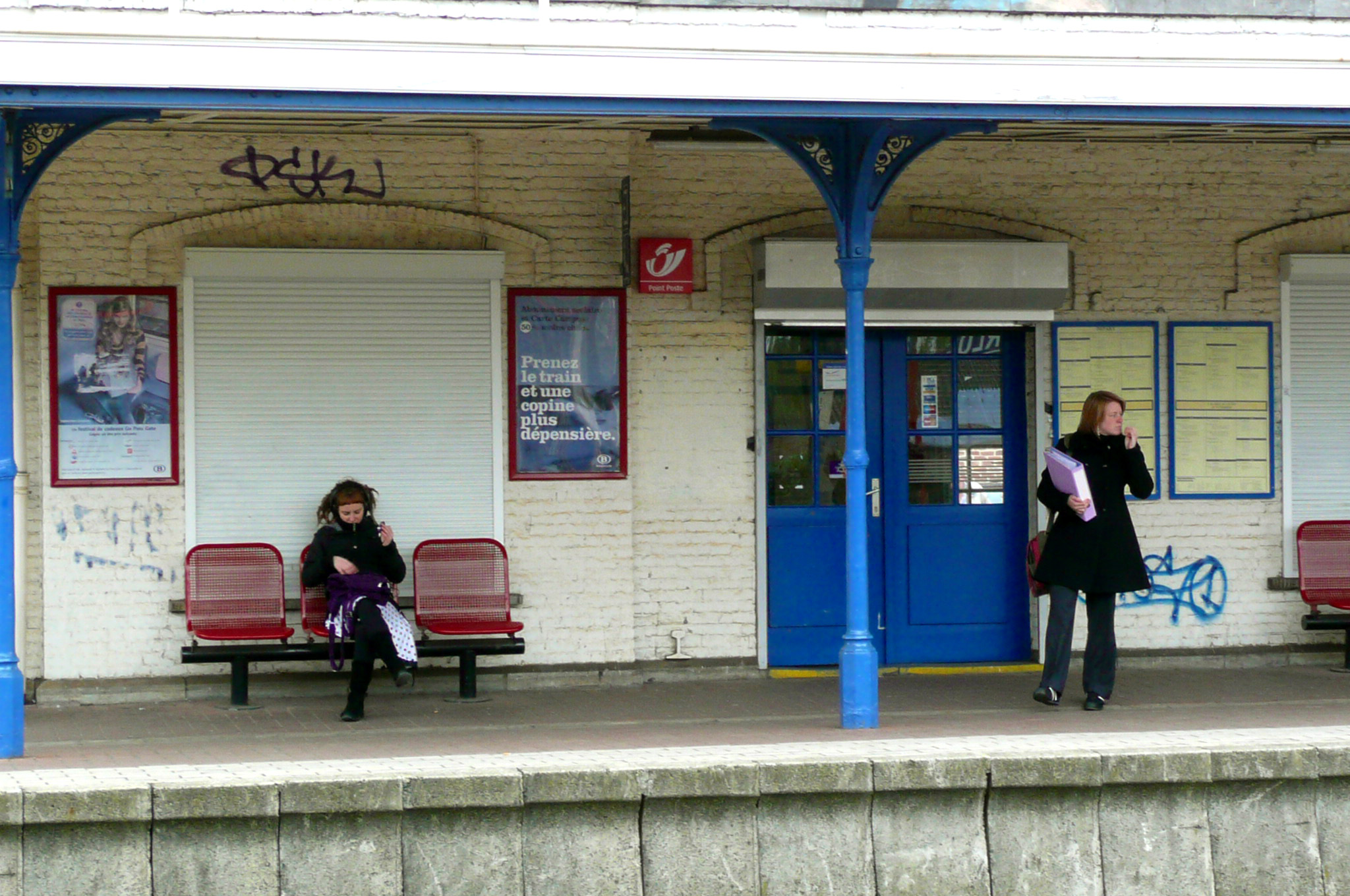

Events from the year 2007 in Belgium

== Incumbents ==
- Monarch: Albert II
- Prime Minister: Guy Verhofstadt

== Events ==
=== May ===
- May 1: Police arrest 30 alleged animal rights extremists in raids in the United Kingdom, Belgium and the Netherlands.
- May 6: A former World No. 1 ranked tennis player from Belgium, Kim Clijsters, announces her retirement effective immediately.
- May 12: Anderlecht win the First Division by becoming 5 points clear of nearest competitor Genk.

=== June ===
- June 10: Belgium holds a general election. The Liberal Prime Minister Guy Verhofstadt is expected to lose power to the Christian Democrats of Yves Leterme.

=== July ===
- July 5: A Belgian court sentences former Rwandan army major Bernard Ntuyahaga to twenty years in jail for the murder of 10 Belgian Army peacekeepers and an undetermined number of civilians in the Rwandan genocide.

=== August ===
- August 13: Two Belgian tourists who went missing last week in Iran appear to have been kidnapped by a bandit who is demanding that his brother be freed from prison.
- August 14: Two Belgians kidnapped in Iran have been released.

=== September ===
- September 4: Australian company Zinifex and Belgian company Umicore merge their zinc smelting operations to form Nyrstar, the largest zinc smelting company.
- September 8: Justine Henin of Belgium wins the U.S. Open women's tennis singles championship defeating Svetlana Kuznetsova of Russia 6-1 6–3 in the final.
- September 11: Belgian police arrest two leaders of the Vlaams Belang party, Frank Vanhecke and Filip Dewinter, as well as dozens of party supporters during a banned march in Brussels against the "Islamisation of Europe".
- September 15: 51st Gordon Bennett Cup to be held in Brussels cancelled due to bad weather.

=== October ===
- October 14: Jonathan Kiptoo from Kenya wins the Marathon of Brussels, in a time of 2:12.16

=== November ===
- November 6: 2007 Belgian government formation: Belgium sets a new national record for the longest period without a new government – 149 days have passed since the general election – as parties are still trying to bridge their opposing views on state reforms.
- November 7: In Belgium, government formation discussions have gone on for a record 150 days as Flemish and Walloon politicians clash over Brussels-Halle-Vilvoorde.
- November 11: A majority of French citizens would support a union with the French-speaking Belgian region of Wallonia if Belgium were to cease to exist, according to a survey.

=== December ===
- December 1: 2007 Belgian government formation: Formateur Yves Leterme resigns.
- December 19: Belgian Prime Minister Guy Verhofstadt forms a temporary coalition government comprising five Socialist and Christian Democrat parties from both main language communities.
- December 21: Belgian authorities arrest 14 people the government calls Islamic extremists, who they say were plotting to free an al-Qaeda member from prison.

== Publications ==
- Raymond van Uytven, Geschiedenis van de dorst: Twintig eeuwen drinken in de Lage Landen (Leuven, Davidsfonds).

== Deaths ==
- March 5: Yvan Delporte, 78, editor-in-chief of Spirou magazine (1956–1968).
- April 27: Karel Dillen, 81, politician, founder of the Flemish Interest party.
- May 22: Jef Planckaert, 73, cyclist.
- June 14: Jacques Simonet, 43, politician and mayor of Anderlecht, heart attack.
- June 26: Liz Claiborne, 78, fashion designer, cancer.
- September 14: Benny Vansteelant, 30, world champion duathlete, bike accident.
- October 13: Andrée de Jongh, 90, Resistance member, organized the Comet Line POW escape network.
- December 23: Frank Swaelen, 77, politician, former President of the Senate and Minister of State.

== See also ==
- 2007 in Belgian television
