= FIP =

FIP or fip may refer to:

== Government and politics ==
- Federal Identity Program, of the government of Canada
- Forestry Incentive Program, of the United States Department of Agriculture
- FTC Fair Information Practice, guidelines promulgated by the United States Federal Trade Commission

== Sport ==
- Federation of International Polo, worldwide governing body for polo
- Federazione Italiana Pallacanestro (Italian Basketball Federation), Italian sports body
- Fielding Independent Pitching, an advanced baseball statistic
- Full Impact Pro, an American professional wrestling promotion
- Federación Internacional de Pádel (International Padel Federation), the international governing body for padel

== Other uses ==
- FIP (radio station), a French radio station
- Factory Instrumentation Protocol, a standardized field bus protocol
- Fédération Internationale de Philatélie, the international philatelic organisation
- Federation of Indian Photography
- Feed-in premium, a policy mechanism to support renewable energy
- Female iron pipe, a plumbing pipe connection to an MIP (male iron pipe); see national pipe thread, American standards on pipe fittings
- Feline infectious peritonitis, a treatable disease in cats
- Financial Intelligence & Processing, a consulting firm
- Finite intersection property, in topology
- Fire Island Pines, New York, United States
- First Independent Pictures, an American motion picture distributor
- Fipa language, a Bantu language of Tanzania
- International Pharmaceutical Federation (French: Fédération Internationale Pharmaceutique)
- Fire Indicator Panel, on a Fire alarm control panel

== See also ==
- FIPI (disambiguation)
