= 1992 in Belgium =

- Decades: 1970s; 1980s; 1990s; 2000s; 2010s
- See also: Other events of 1992; List of years in Belgium

Events from the year 1992 in Belgium.

== Incumbents ==
- Monarch: Baudouin
- Prime Minister: Wilfried Martens (to 7 March); Jean-Luc Dehaene (from 7 March)

== Events ==
- 7 February – Belgium a signatory of the Maastricht Treaty
- 24 March to 2 April – Dirk Frimout is the first Belgian in space
- 6 June – The 70-point plan (Belgium) is presented by Filip Dewinter Vlaams Blok as an "answer to the problem of immigrants." It wanted to prove that a policy of return of immigrants could be realised. The plan was heavily criticised because it was considered to be in breach of the European Convention on Human Rights (ECHR).

== Publications ==
- Leo Joseph Suenens, Memories and Hopes (Dublin: Veritas)
- Marcel van Meerhaeghe (ed.), Belgium and EC Membership Evaluated (London and New York)

== Births ==
- 13 January – Marnick Vermijl, footballer
- 26 February – Matz Sels, professional footballer
- 1 March – Dylan Teuns, cyclist
- 27 March – Arthur De Greef, tennis player
- 28 March – Stoffel Vandoorne, racing driver
- 11 May – Thibaut Courtois, footballer
- 18 May – Jorik Hendrickx, figure skater
- 17 June – Maxime Lestienne, footballer
- 25 June – Koen Casteels, footballer
- 10 July – Jonas Bloquet, actor
- 21 July – Charlotte de Witte, DJ and record producer
- 24 August – Hans Vanaken, footballer
- 20 September – Dylan Borlée, sprinter
- 23 October – Thomas Kaminski, footballer
- 7 November – Laurens De Bock, footballer
- 4 December – Robin Bruyère, politician

== Deaths ==
- 19 November – René Tavernier (born 1914), geologist
- 12 December – Suzanne Lilar (born 1901), writer
- 24 December – Peyo (born Pierre Culliford, 1928), comics artist
