= 1998 in Belgium =

- Decades: 1970s; 1980s; 1990s; 2000s; 2010s
- See also: Other events of 1998; List of years in Belgium

Events from the year 1998 in Belgium

== Incumbents ==
- Monarch: Albert II
- Prime Minister: Jean-Luc Dehaene

== Events ==
- 23 April – Marc Dutroux briefly escapes from custody

== Publications ==
- J. C. H. Blom and E. Lamberts (eds), History of the Low Countries (New York, Berghahn Books)
- Dan Michman (ed.), Belgium and the Holocaust: Jews, Belgians, Germans (Jerusalem, Vad Yashem)
- André Pickels and Jacques Sojcher, Belgique: toujours grande et belle (Brussels, Edition Complexe)
- Marc Swyngedouw and Marco Martiniello (eds), Belgische toestanden: de lotgevallen van een kleine biculturele Europese democratie (Antwerp, Standaard; Amsterdam, Anthos)

== Births ==
- 26 July – Achraf El Yakhloufi, politician
- 3 September – Oskar Seuntjens, politician

== Deaths ==
- 30 March – Max Cosyns (born 1906), explorer
- 5 June — Luc Gillon (born 1920), priest-scientist
- 15 June — Anton van Wilderode (born 1918), priest-poet
- 2 October – Olivier Gendebien (born 1924), racing driver
