= 2003 in Belgium =

- Decades: 1980s; 1990s; 2000s; 2010s; 2020s
- See also: Other events of 2003; List of years in Belgium

Events from the year 2003 in Belgium

== Incumbents ==
- Monarch: Albert II
- Prime Minister: Guy Verhofstadt

== Events ==
February

- 1 February – Lucas Van Looy consecrated as bishop of Ghent
- 15 February – 70,000 people march through the streets of Brussels as part of the global anti-war protest.
- 15–16 February – Antwerp diamond heist (largest diamond robbery and one of the largest robberies in history)

April

- 12 April – Wedding of Prince Laurent and Claire Coombs

May

- 15 May – Art deco cinema De Roma in Borgerhout reopens as a cultural centre and performance venue
- 18 May – Belgian federal election, 2003

June

- 1 June – Same-sex marriage becomes legal in Belgium

July

- 12 July – Verhofstadt II Government sworn in

August
September

- 7 September – Guy Harpigny consecrated as bishop of Tournai

October

- 1 October – Merger between 3 universities leads to the establishment of the University of Antwerp.

== Births ==
- 23 April – Princess Laetitia Maria of Belgium, Archduchess of Austria-Este, fifth child of Prince Lorenz of Belgium, Archduke of Austria-Este and Princess Astrid of Belgium
- 20 August – Prince Gabriel of Belgium, second child of Philippe of Belgium (then Duke of Brabant) and Mathilde of Belgium

== Deaths ==
January

- 8 January – Franz Drappier comic book writer
- 11 January – Bob Maertens soccer player
- 22 January – Georges Mommerency politician
- 29 January – Louis Baret singer and comedian

February

- 4 February
  - Pierre Carteus soccer player
  - André Noyelle cyclist
- 6 February – Mark Braet poet and politician
- 9 February – René Uyttendaele mayor
- 26 February
  - Christian Goethals race-car driver
  - Michel Van Maele mayor

March

- 11 March – Jacques Yerna politician
- 31 March – Theo Mertens trumpet player

April

- 3 April – Karel Boumans comic book writer
- 17 April – Jeff Schell molecular biologist
- 20 April – Henri Lemaître papal diplomat

May

- 15 May
  - Rik Van Steenbergen cyclist
  - Marcel Thielemans singer and trombone player
- 22 May – Albert Mettens soccer player

June

- 1 June – André Lootens mayor
- 26 June – Gerard Gaudaen wood carver

July

- 18 July – Daniël Van Avermaet TV presenter

August

- 1 August – Guy Thys soccer manager
- 5 August – Maurice Mollin cyclist

September

- 4 September – Lola Bobesco violinist
- 8 September – August Vanistendael union leader and politician
- 22 September
  - Maxime Brunfaut architect
  - Armand Pien weather man and TV presenter

October

- 29 October – Albert Cool mayor
- 30 October – Antoon Roosens philosopher

November

- 11 November – Paul Janssen, founder of Janssen Pharmaceutica

December

- 8 December – Charly Talbot politician
- 11 December – Ann Petersen actress

== See also ==
- 2003 in Belgian television
