= 2000 in Belgium =

- Decades: 1980s; 1990s; 2000s; 2010s; 2020s
- See also: Other events of 2000; List of years in Belgium

Events from the year 2000 in Belgium

== Incumbents ==
- Monarch: Albert II
- Prime Minister: Guy Verhofstadt

== Events ==
- 10 June to 2 July – Belgium and the Netherlands jointly host the UEFA Euro 2000 football tournament, which is won by France.
- 17 June – 174 fans from England are arrested in Brussels, following an affray with German fans ahead of an England v Germany match.
- 6 August – 54th Spa 24 Hours held at Spa-Francorchamps
- 9 September – 44th Gordon Bennett Cup held in Saint-Hubert.
- 8 October – Provincial and municipal elections

== Publications ==
- Francis Delpérée, Le droit constitutionnel de la Belgique (Brussels, Bruylant; Paris, L.G.D.J.).

== Births ==
- 25 January – Remco Evenepoel, cyclist
- 26 March – Nina Derwael, gymnast
- 29 December – Eliot Vassamillet, Eurovision singer
- 15 June – Jérémie Makiese, Eurovision singer

== Deaths ==
- 23 May – Eddy Blondeel, 94, commander of the SAS during WWII
- 9 November – Michel Demaret, 60, politician

== See also ==
- 2000 in Belgian television
