= 't Pallieterke =

Flemish weekly satirical magazine (f. 1945)

't Pallieterke is a satirical Flemish weekly magazine. It is part of the Flemish movement and advocates Flemish independence. It is largely conservative in its editing.

== History and profile ==
't Pallieterke was founded in 1945 by Bruno De Winter, an Antwerp journalist. The magazine has its headquarters in Antwerp and is published on a weekly basis.

In 1955 De Winter was succeeded by Jan Nuyts as editor-in-chief, whose tenure lasted till 2000. The current editor-in-chief is Leo Custers. Its cartoonists have included Jef Nys and Brasser. Other contributors are or were Gerolf Annemans, Paul Beliën and Koenraad Elst.

== See also ==
- List of magazines in Belgium
