= 1991 in Belgium =

- Decades: 1970s; 1980s; 1990s; 2000s; 2010s
- See also: Other events of 1991; List of years in Belgium

Events from the year 1991 in Belgium

== Incumbents ==
- Monarch: Baudouin
- Prime Minister: Wilfried Martens

== Events ==
- 7 February – André-Joseph Léonard appointed Bishop of Namur by Pope John Paul II
- 14 April – André-Joseph Léonard consecrated as Bishop of Namur by Cardinal Godfried Danneels
- 18 July - Assassination of Socialist politician André Cools.
- 25 August - The Belgian Grand Prix is held at the Circuit de Spa-Francorchamps and is won by Ayrton Senna.
- 4 September – Belgian model Ingrid Seynhaeve, aged 18, wins Elite Look of the Year contest in New York.
- 29 September - New government formed under incumbent Prime Minister Wilfried Martens
- 24 November - Belgian general election, 1991
- 27 December – Léonce-Albert Van Peteghem retires as bishop of Ghent

== Births ==
- 7 January - Eden Hazard, footballer
- 28 June - Kevin De Bruyne, footballer
- 12 September - Thomas Meunier, footballer
- 12 November - Gijs Van Hoecke, cyclist

== Deaths ==
- 18 July - André Cools (63), Socialist politician and former government minister
- 27 September - Alois Vansteenkiste (63), cyclist
