= Van der Auwera =

van der Auwera is a surname. Notable people with the surname include:

- Ferdinand Van der Auwera (born 1929), pseudonym Fernand Auwera, Belgian writer
- Jan Van Der Auwera (1924–2004), Belgian footballer
- Johan van der Auwera (born 1953), Belgian linguist
- Marcel Van Der Auwera (born 1923), Belgian fencer
