= FIPS =

FIPS or Fips may refer to:

== Computing ==
- FIPS (computer program), First nondestructive Interactive Partition Splitter, a disk partitioner
- Federal Information Processing Standards, United States government standards

== People ==
- Werner Fürbringer (1888–1982), German U-boat commander
- Philipp Rupprecht (1900–1975), pen name of the German cartoonist

== Games ==
- Fips or Fipsen, a north German card game.

== See also ==
- FIP (disambiguation)
