= Mabille =

Mabille is a surname. Notable people with the surname include:

- Alexis Mabille (born 1977), French fashion designer
- Jules François Mabille (1831−1904), French malacologist, biologist and zoologist
- Jules Paul Mabille (1835–1923), French entomologist
- Xavier Mabille (1933–2012), Belgian historian and political scientist
