= 2002 in Belgium =

- Decades: 1980s; 1990s; 2000s; 2010s; 2020s
- See also: Other events of 2002; List of years in Belgium

Events from the year 2002 in Belgium

== Incumbents ==
- Monarch: Albert II
- Prime Minister: Guy Verhofstadt

== Events ==
January

- 1 January – Reform of Belgian local police territories into 28 "zones" comes into effect. The Euro Currency officially became the legal tender for Belgium, along with the other European Union (EU) Eurozone member area countries, replacing the Belgian franc by being introduced physically with the official launch of the currency coins and banknotes. Belgium entered a period on the same day where specifically both the Euro Currency and the Belgian franc were in dual circulation until exactly February 28.

April

- World's first fetoscopic tracheal occlusion for congenital diaphragmatic hernia carried out in UZ Leuven.

June

- 13 June – Peter Carmeliet awarded the Francqui Prize for his work in the biological and medical sciences.

August

- 3-4 August – 2002 Spa 24 Hours won by Larbre Compétition

September

- 1 September – 2002 Belgian Grand Prix at the Circuit de Spa-Francorchamps won by Michael Schumacher.
- 21 September – Antwerp fashion museum opens.

October

- 30 October – Frank De Winne's first spaceflight begins.

December

- 4 December – Xavier Deutsch awarded the Prix Rossel for La Belle Étoile.

== Art and architecture ==
Buildings

- Poelaert Elevators in Brussels inaugurated
- Art Deco Flagey Building, former national broadcasting headquarters, reopens as a cultural centre after renovations.

== Births ==
- 15 January – Jannes Van Hecke, footballer
- 2 May – Killian Sardella, footballer
- 8 August – Marco Kana, footballer
- 21 August – Isaac Asante, footballer

== Deaths ==
January

- 15 January – Jean Dockx, footballer (born 1941)
- 28 January – Gustaaf Deloor, cyclist (born 1913)

February

- 11 February – Frans Van Coetsem, linguist (born 1919)

March

- 23 March – Marcel Kint, cyclist (born 1914)

April

- 20 April – Pierre Rapsat, singer-songwriter (born 1948)

June

- 7 June – Lilian, Princess of Réthy (born 1916)

November

- 19 November – Prince Alexandre de Mérode (born 1934)

December

- 20 December – J. A. van Houtte, historian (born 1913)

== See also ==
- 2002 in Belgian television
