= Bosschaert =

Bosschaert is a surname. Notable people with the surname include:

- Ambrosius Bosschaert (1573–1621), Dutch still life painter
- Jan Bosschaert, Belgian comics artist
- Jan Baptist Bosschaert, Flemish still life painter
- Johannes Bosschaert, Dutch still life painter
- Renaat Bosschaert, Belgian artist
- Thomas Willeboirts Bosschaert, Belgian Baroque painter
