= Vincent de Coorebyter =

Belgian political scientist

Vincent de Coorebyter (born 18 November 1960) is a Belgian philosopher and political scientist. He is director-general of the Belgium-based Centre de recherche et d'information socio-politiques (CRISP or "Centre for Socio-Political Research") since 1999. He is also member of The Royal Academies for Science and the Arts of Belgium. He is a renowned exegete of Jean-Paul Sartre and the co-editor of the journal Études sartriennes.

He left the management of CRISP in September 2013 to become a professor at ULB, the Free University of Brussels. He holds the Chair of Contemporary Social and Political Philosophy (transversal chair, Faculty of Philosophy and Letters and Faculty of Law and Criminology).

== See also ==
- Xavier Mabille
