= 1789 in Belgium =

- Decades
- See also: Other events of 1789; List of years in Belgium

Events in the year 1789 in the Austrian Netherlands and Prince-bishopric of Liège (predecessor states of modern Belgium).

== Incumbents ==
=== Habsburg Netherlands ===
Monarch – Joseph II

Governor General – Maria Christina of Austria-Lorraine with Albert Casimir of Saxony

Minister Plenipotentiary – Ferdinand von Trauttmansdorff

=== Prince-Bishopric of Liège ===
Prince-Bishop – César-Constantin-François de Hoensbroeck

== Events ==
April

- 29 April – Joseph II's government in Brussels issues a decree establishing rural representation in the Third Estate of the States of Brabant and abolishing their right to veto taxes.

May

- 8 May – Council of Brabant refuses to register the decree abolishing the veto of the Third Estate in the States of Brabant.

June

- 6 June – Joseph II instructs his minister in Brussels to decree that ordinary taxes will henceforth no longer be subject to annual approval by the States of Brabant.
- 18 June – In a government coup, Ferdinand von Trauttmansdorff, Joseph II's minister in Brussels, decrees the abolition of the Council of Brabant, the States of Brabant, and the Joyous Entry.

August

- 18 August – Beginning of Liège Revolution: democrats occupy the town hall
- 26 August – César-Constantin-François de Hoensbroeck, prince-bishop of Liège, flees to Trier; Republic of Liège proclaimed.

September

- 16 September – Déclaration des droits de l'homme et du citoyen de Franchimont: Declaration of Rights proclaimed at Franchimont Castle.

October

- 24 October – Army of émigré volunteers invades the Austrian Netherlands; Manifesto of the People of Brabant read out in Hoogstraten.
- 27 October – Battle of Turnhout (1789): government forces defeated by émigrés.

November

- Prussian forces sent to quell Liège revolution occupy the city of Liège.

December

- 12 December – Government of Joseph II, headed by Ferdinand von Trauttmansdorff, evacuates Brussels; General Council of Government abolished.

== Publications and performances ==
- André Grétry
  - 2 March – Raoul Barbe-bleue (opera), Paris, Comédie-Italienne
  - 17 March – Aspasie (opera), Paris, Opéra

== Births ==
May

- 4 May – Alexandre Gendebien, government minister (died 1869)

April

- 10 April – Princess Amélie Louise of Arenberg, noblewoman (died 1823)

October

- 14 October – Constant van Crombrugghe, founder of the Josephites of Belgium (died 1865)
