= 1719 in Belgium =

- Decades
- See also: Other events of 1719; List of years in Belgium

Events in the year 1719 in the Austrian Netherlands and Prince-bishopric of Liège (predecessor states of modern Belgium).

== Incumbents ==
=== Habsburg Netherlands ===
Monarch – Charles VI, Holy Roman Emperor, Duke of Brabant, of Luxembourg, etc.

Governor General – Prince Eugene of Savoy

Acting Governor General — Hercule-Louis Turinetti

=== Prince-Bishopric of Liège ===
Prince-Bishop – Joseph Clemens of Bavaria

== Events ==
- 15 January — Pope Clement IX issues the breve Pietatis vestrae in response to a letter from the bishops of the Austrian Netherlands protesting their adherence to the 1713 bull Unigenitus.
- 5 February — The Saint-Joseph sets sail from Ostend for Canton.
- 3 August — The Saint-Joseph from Ostend arrives in Canton.
- 9 September — Frans Anneessens, dean of the masons' guild, condemned to death for resisting innovations in city government detrimental to the power of the guilds of Brussels.
- 19 September — Frans Anneessens beheaded in Brussels.
- 16 October — Bishop Hendrik Jozef van Susteren reopens Bruges seminary (closed in 1632).
- 22 October — Confraternity of St Joseph re-established in Bruges.
- 16 November — Oratorian College, Mechelen, celebrates a former student, Henricus van Gaemeren, graduating from Leuven University as first in his year.
- 27 November — The Saint-Joseph, from Ostend, sets sail from Canton laden with tea, porcelain, silk, and Chinese roots.

== Art and architecture ==
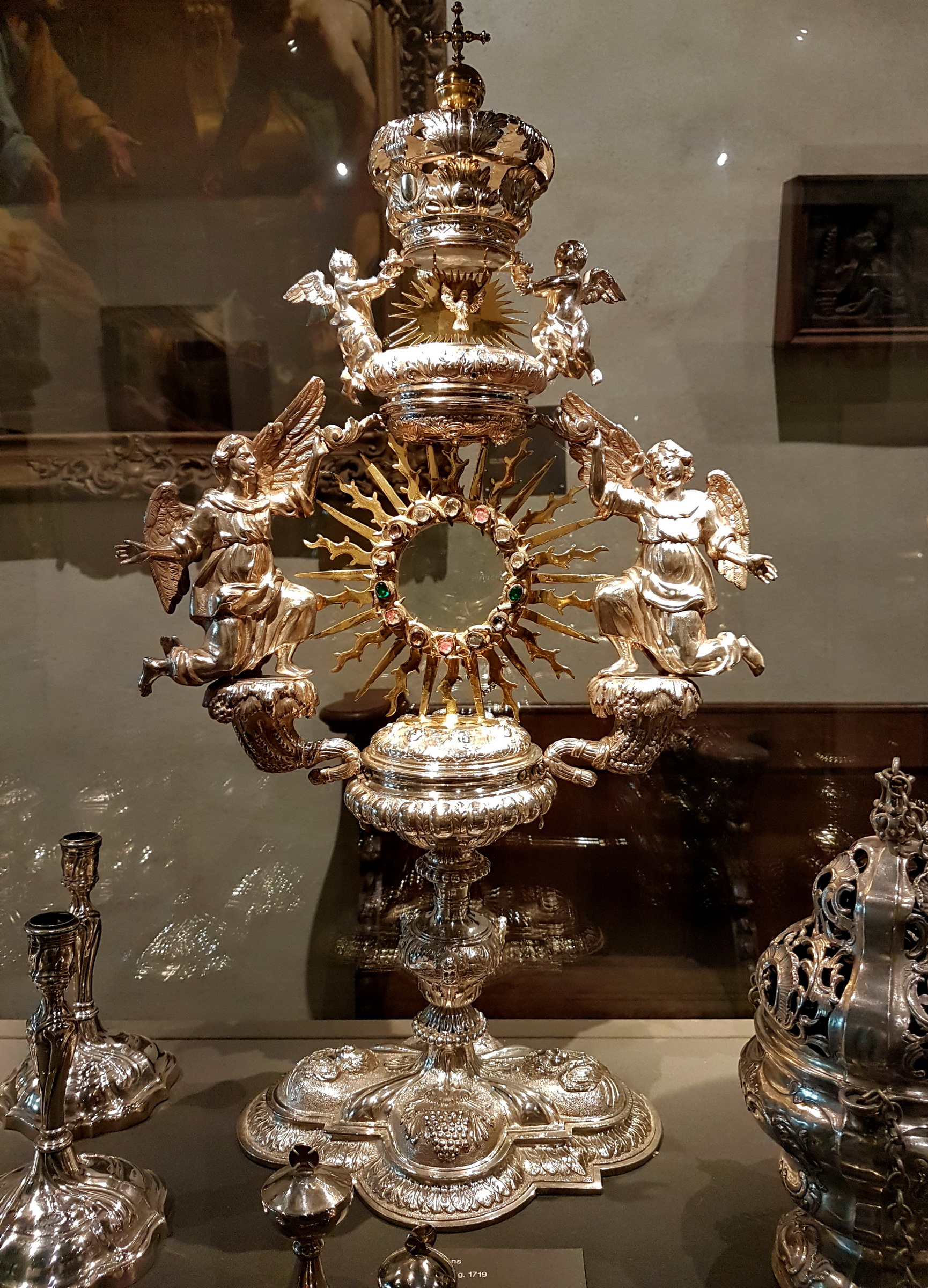
A silver monstrance made in Luxembourg in 1719, now in the treasury of the Basilica of Saint Servatius, Maastricht

Art objects

- Silver monstrance (pictured)

Paintings

- Louis Counet, Allégorie de la Religion, Liège town hall

Buildings

- Kasteel De Mot, Ternat
- Lindemansschool, Roosdaal

== Publications ==
- Bernaert de Jonghe, Belgium Dominicanum sive historia Provinciæ Germaniæ Inferioris sacri ordinis FF. Prædicatorum (Brussels, Francisci Foppens)

== Births ==
- 11 June — François-Charles de Velbrück, prince-bishop of Liège (died 1784)
- 3 December — Jean Charles Joseph de Merode, nobleman (died 1774)

== Deaths ==
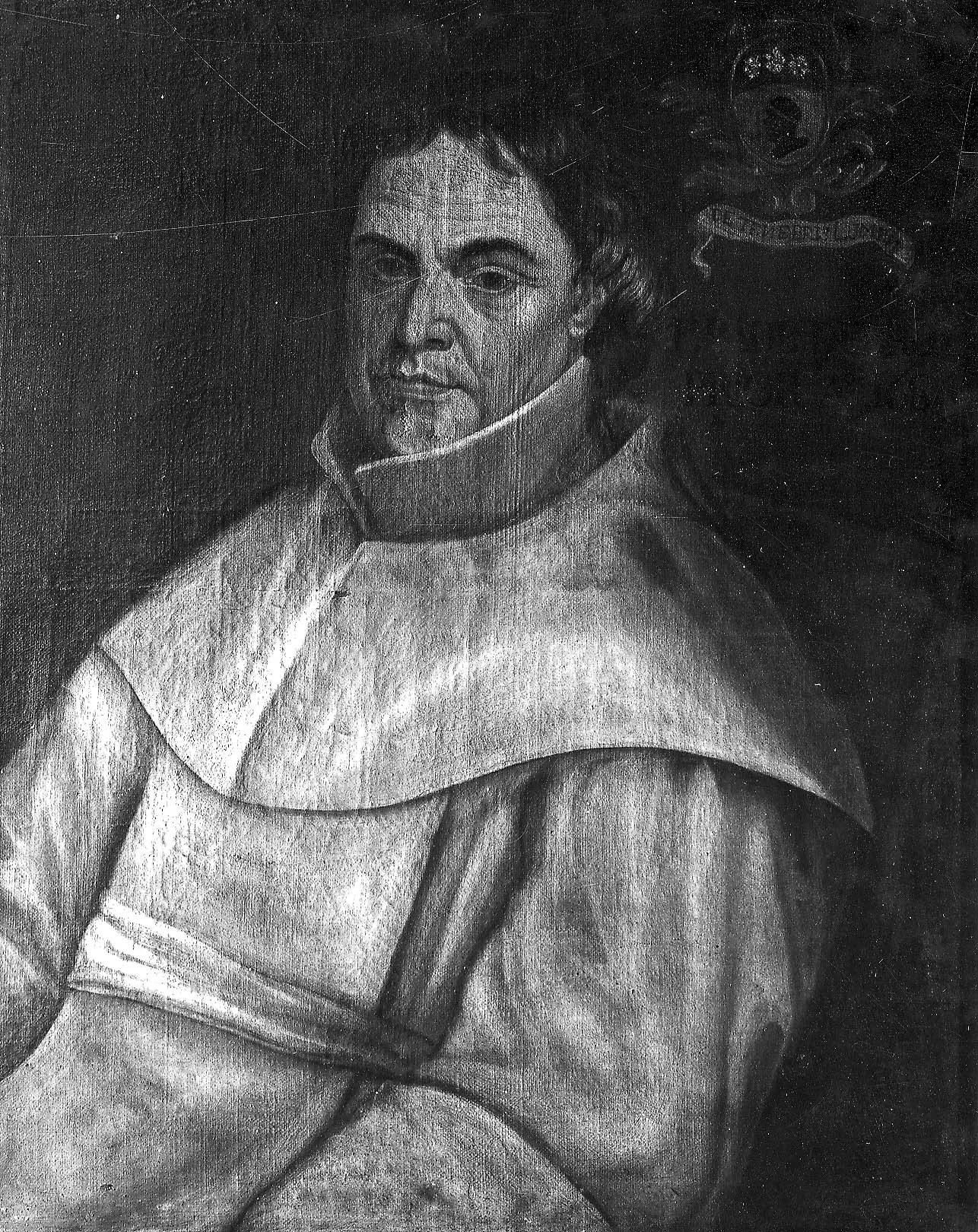
Portrait of Paul de Bruyn by an unknown artist

- Date unknown — Jan Baptist Brueghel (born 1647), painter
- 6 February — Paul de Bruyn (born 1646), abbot of Park.
- 9 March — Peeter van Bredael (born 1629), painter
- 19 September — Frans Anneessens (born 1660), guildmaster
- 27 October — François Baert (born 1651), Bollandist
- 3 December — Adriaen Frans Boudewijns (born 1644), painter
