= 1659 in Belgium =

- Decades: 1630s; 1650s
- See also: Other events of 1659; List of years in Belgium

Belgium (1659)

Events in the year 1659 in the Spanish Netherlands and Prince-bishopric of Liège (predecessor states of modern Belgium).

== Incumbents ==
=== Habsburg Netherlands ===
Monarch – Philip IV, King of Spain and Duke of Brabant, of Luxembourg, etc.

Governor General – John of Austria the Younger (until November); Luis de Benavides Carrillo, Marquis of Caracena (from November)

=== Prince-Bishopric of Liège ===
Prince-Bishop – Maximilian Henry of Bavaria

== Events ==
- 27 October – Magistrates in Antwerp order the removal of chains from the streets after guild protests against the monopoly of the royal postmaster
- 7 November – Treaty of the Pyrenees signed, ending Franco-Spanish War (1635–1659)

== Art and architecture ==
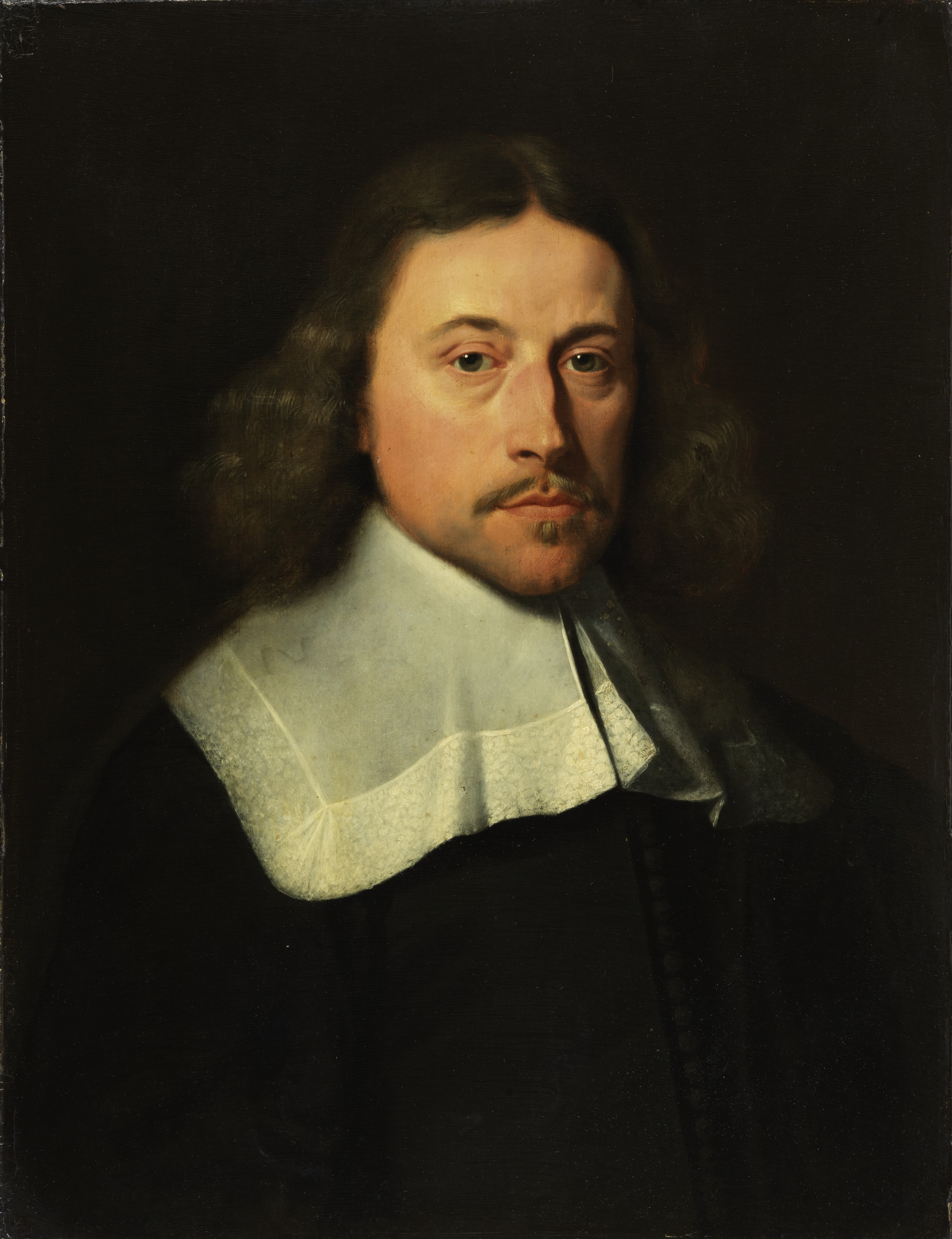
Jacob van Reesbroeck, Portrait of Balthasar II Moretus (c. 1659), Plantin-Moretus Museum

Paintings

- Jacob van Reesbroeck, Portrait of Balthasar II Moretus

== Publications ==
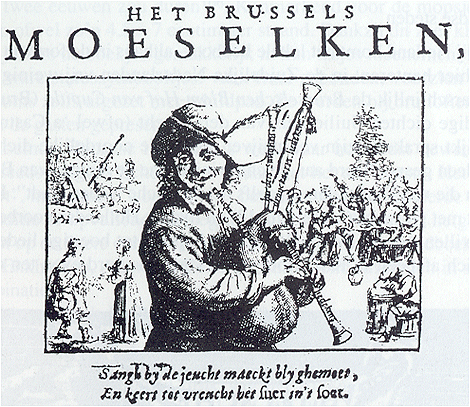
Het Brussels Moeselken (Brussels, Gielis Stryckwant, 1659)

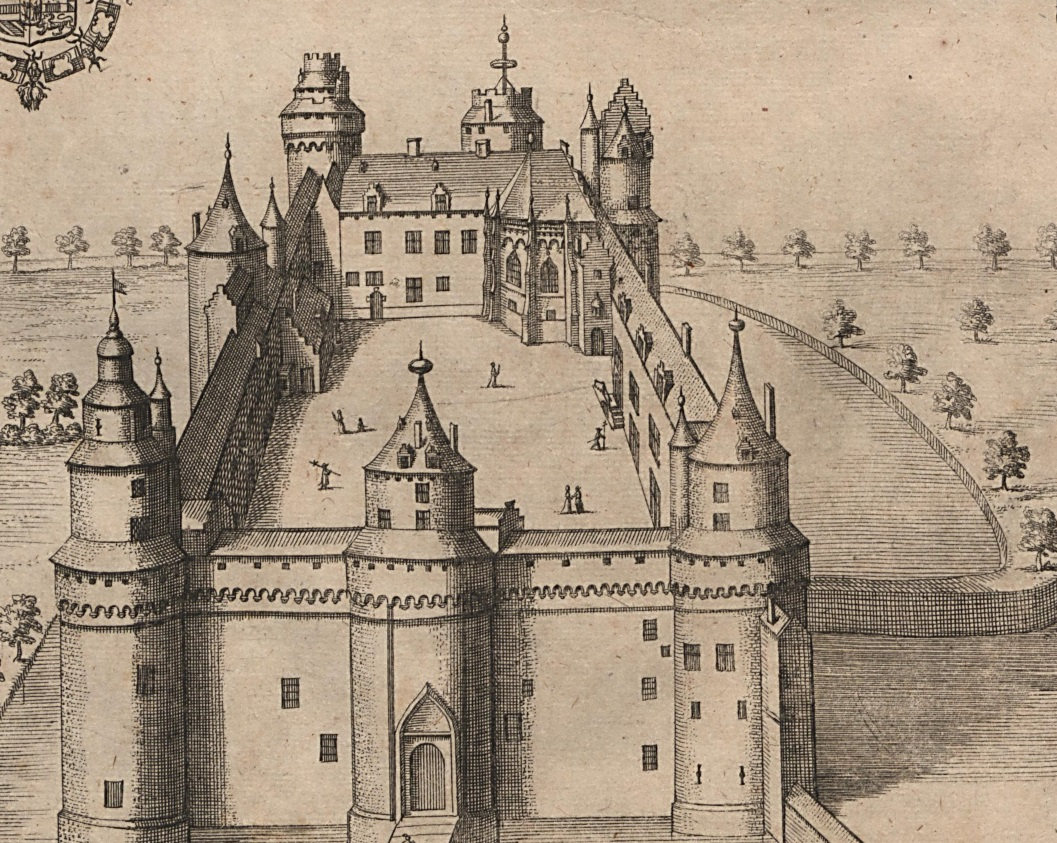
Vilvoorde Castle from Antonius Sanderus, Chorographia sacra Brabantiae, part 1

- Het Brussels Moeselken (Brussels, Gielis Stryckwant)
- Nicolás Antonio, De exilio sive De exilii poena antiqua et nova libri tres (Antwerp, Jacob Meurs)
- P. de Cambry, Abbregé de la vie de dame Jenne de Cambry, premierement religieuse de l'ordre de S. Augustin à Tournay, & depuis soeur Ienne Marie de la Presentation recluse lez Lille (Antwerp, Jacques Mesens) — a biography of Jeanne de Cambry
- Jean-Jacques Chifflet, Antiqua Rerum Brabanticarum et Belgicarum Monumenta (Antwerp, Plantin Press)
- Laurent Chifflet, Essay d'une parfaite grammaire de la langue françoise (Antwerp, Jacob Meurs)
- Antonius Sanderus, Chorographia sacra Brabantiae, part 1
- René-François de Sluse, Mesolabum.
- André Tacquet, Cylindricorum et annularium liber V (Antwerp, Jacob Meurs)
- Arnout Van Geluwe, Claer Bewys Dat Christus hier op der aerden geen duysent-jaerigh Rijcke en sal comen op-rechten, om met de Martelaeren inden vleessche duysent Iaeren te regneren, als Coningen ende Priesters, ghelijck de nieuwe Duysent-jaers-ghesinde Propheten, ofte genaemde wel-meenende Christenen van Amsterdam droomen (Ghent, Maximiliaan Graet)
- Michael van Langren, Briefve description de la ville et havre d'Oostende (Brussels, Philippe Vleugart

Newspapers

- Relations veritables, edited by Pierre Hugonet (Brussels, printed by Guillaume Scheybels to be sold by Guillaume Hacquebaud)

== Births ==
- date unknown –
  - John Baptist Medina, painter (died 1710)
  - Catarina Ykens, painter (died c. 1737)

== Deaths ==
- 30 March – Andries de Coninck (born c. 1615), painter
- 8 August – Filippo Spinola, 2nd Marquis of Los Balbases (born 1594), nobleman
- 24 October – Philippe Brasseur (born 1597), poet and historian
- 12 December – Guillaume de Lamboy, Baron of Cortesheim (born 1590), soldier
- 22 December (burial) – Schelte a Bolswert (born c. 1586), engraver
- date unknown – Frans Wouters (born 1612), painter
