= Forest Land Enhancement Program =

The Forestland Enhancement Program (FLEP) was adopted in the 2002 farm bill (P.L. 107-171, Sec. 8002) as an amendment to the Cooperative Forestry Assistance Act of 1978 (P.L. 95-313; 16 U.S.C. 2101 et seq.). FLEP replaces the Stewardship Incentives Program (SIP) and the Forestry Incentives Program (FIP). FLEP is optional in each state and is a voluntary program for non-industrial private forest (NIPF) landowners. It provides for technical, educational, and cost-share assistance to promote sustainability of the NIPF forests. The law provided FLEP with $100 million from the CCC through FY07. Half of these funds were diverted to wildfire control in 2003, and $40 million of those funds have not been replenished and the spending authority has been cancelled.
