= Stewardship Incentives Program =

The Stewardship Incentives Program (SIP) is a program administered by the United States Forest Service through the Farm Service Agency that provided up to 75% cost sharing for silvicultural activities implementing approved renewable resource plans. The program was terminated in the 2002 farm bill (P.L. 107–171), and replaced with the Forest Land Enhancement Program (FLEP).
