= 1531 in Belgium =

- Decades: 1520s; 1530s; 1550s
- See also: Other events of 1531; List of years in Belgium

Events of 1531 in the Habsburg Netherlands and Prince-bishopric of Liège, predecessor states of modern Belgium.

== Incumbents ==
=== Habsburg Netherlands ===
Monarch - Charles V, Holy Roman Emperor, King of Spain, Duke of Brabant, of Luxembourg, etc.

Regent - Mary of Hungary, from 26 September

=== Prince-Bishopric of Liège ===
Prince-Bishop - Érard de La Marck

== Events ==
July

- 27 July – A dozen leaders of the Rivageois revolt hanged in Liège.

September

- 26 September – Mary of Hungary appointed regent over the Habsburg Netherlands.

October

- 1 October – Charles V reorganises the governing institutions of the Habsburg Netherlands, establishing three "collateral councils" as the highest government bodies: the Brussels Privy Council, Council of State, and Council of Finances.
- 7 October – Edicts issued on coins, notaries, monopolies, vagrancy and poor relief, and on the printing of heretical books.

November

- 19 November – Charles V issues decree reorganizing the Council of Luxembourg.

== Art ==
- Bernard van Orley and William Dermoyen – The Battle of Pavia (tapestry, woven between 1528 and 1531)

== Births ==
October

- 25 October – Matthew Wesenbeck, jurist (d. 1586)

December

- Hendrick van Brederode, rebel commander (d. 1568)
