= Dioxin affair =

1999 political scandal in Belgium

The Dioxin affair (French: Crise de la dioxine, Dutch: Dioxinecrisis) was a political scandal that occurred in Belgium in 1999.

Animal food products, mainly chicken and eggs, were found to be contaminated with polychlorinated biphenyls (PCB), a dioxin-like class of compounds known for their negative health effects. PCB was detected and reported by health inspectors in January, but measurements were taken by the government only from May when the Belgian media revealed the case to the public. Flemish Liberals and Democrats (VLD) opposition leader Guy Verhofstadt claimed that the government was trying to cover-up the scandal, which proved that several secretaries of state had been informed much earlier that the food contained PCBs and dioxins.

The Dioxin affair was the one of a series of highly publicised scandals in Belgium during the 1990s, including the Agusta scandal, the "Hormone Mafia", and the Dutroux affair. It was exposed shortly before the 1999 Belgian federal and regional elections, and contributed to the historic defeat of Prime Minister Jean-Luc Dehaene and his Christian People's Party.

== Political scandal ==
The Dioxin affair started with some complaints from chicken farmers in Belgium in January 1999, who had noticed an increased death among newborn chicks. Laboratory analysis confirmed the presence of dioxin-like toxins well above normal limits in the eggs, tissues and poultry feed of the affected birds. It was later confirmed that the dioxin-like toxicity was a result of the presence in the birds’ feed of PCB, many of which form part of the group of dioxins and dioxin-like compounds which have toxic properties.

Karel Pinxten, the Minister of Agriculture, and Marcel Colla, the Minister of Health, immediately resigned their positions and a commission was installed to investigate the probable sources of contamination, and the errors that had been made by the government. Later investigations revealed that the source of the contamination came from an oil-and-fat-recycling company, Verkest, from Deinze. The fats were reprocessed into animal feed that also contained transformer oil, a coolant fluid that was a known source of PCBs.

Public concern about the quality of animal food in general became a hot issue in the media. This forced the commission to ban certain recycling streams (like frying oil) from entering the food chain in order to prevent future contamination. Later studies indicated that there was never a significant danger to human health because contamination only impacted a small proportion (at most 2%) of the food chain over a limited period. Seven million chickens and fifty thousand pigs were slaughtered and discarded.

Many farms were closed down for months and animal food products were banned from the market. During the investigation, questions were raised as to whether the costs for destroying the food and feedstock were necessary, as it seemed obvious that the contaminated food had already passed through the food market during the period from January to May. To protect the farmers, the Belgian government promised to compensate them for their losses. The crisis also damaged the export of Belgian animal products. Many Belgians went shopping for meat and dairy products in foreign countries. The total costs of the food crisis are estimated at 25 billion francs, or 625 million euros.

== Political implications ==
The dioxin crisis strongly influenced the federal elections of 1999 (as well as the regional elections of 1999). The governing party, Christian People's Party (CVP), suffered a historic loss and forced the end of premier Jean-Luc Dehaene's eight-year reign. This meant a victory for the VLD and Guy Verhofstadt, who had brought the affair to public attention in the first place, resulting in him becoming Prime Minister of Belgium until 2007. Green parties Ecolo and Agalev were also able to profit from the public concern around environment and food quality.

== Health implications ==
In 2001, a public report announced that high dioxin levels were detected in Belgians' blood plasma compared to other European populations. A direct link to the dioxin crisis seemed obvious. Later comparison with blood samples that were taken before the crisis disproved this hypothesis. High levels could also be attributed to the dense populations and industry.

== See also ==
- Dioxin controversy
- Federal Agency for the Safety of the Food Chain
