= FIPI =

FIPI may stand for:

- Five Item Personality Inventory: see Big Five personality traits#Measurements
- Federation of Image Professionals International: see Personal stylist
- Federation of Indian Petroleum Industry
- Forest Investigation and Planning Institute of Vietnam
