= Charles Lambert d'Outrepont =

Charles Lambert d'Outrepont (1746–1809) was a lawyer from the Austrian Netherlands who became a legislator in the French First Republic.

== Life ==
D'Outrepont was born in Herve (now in Belgium) on 16 September 1746, the son of Thomas d'Outrepont and Marie-Françoise Debeur. He matriculated at Leuven University on 22 January 1765, in Lily College, and graduated Licentiate of Law in 1771. He was sworn in as an advocate before the Council of Brabant, the highest law court in the Duchy of Brabant, on 18 December 1771.

In the 1780s he engaged in controversies about the origin and history of tithes in the Low Countries, marriage law, and constitutional law. He was an adherent of the more radical movement led by Jan Frans Vonck in the Brabant Revolution.

After the French invasion of 1792 he was deputised to the National Convention to argue against the annexation of Belgium to France, in which he was unsuccessful. He went on to serve as commissioner of the French Directory to the tribunal of the Département de la Dyle (1795), professor of legislation at the École Centrale de Bruxelles (1797), a deputy on the Council of Five Hundred (1798), and a judge on the Court of Cassation. He died in Paris on 4 March 1809.

== Works ==
- Essai historique sur l'origine des dixmes (1780)
- Défense de l'Essai historique sur l'origine des dixmes, à M. l'abbé Ghesquière (1785)
- Des Empêchemens dirimant le Contrat de Mariage dans les Pays Bas Autrichiens (1787)
- Considérations sur la Constitution des Duchés de Brabant et de Limbourg (1787)
- Qu'allons-nous devenir? Ou avis essentiel d'un belge à ses concitoyens (1790)
