= Switel Hotel fire =

1994 fire in Antwerp, Belgium

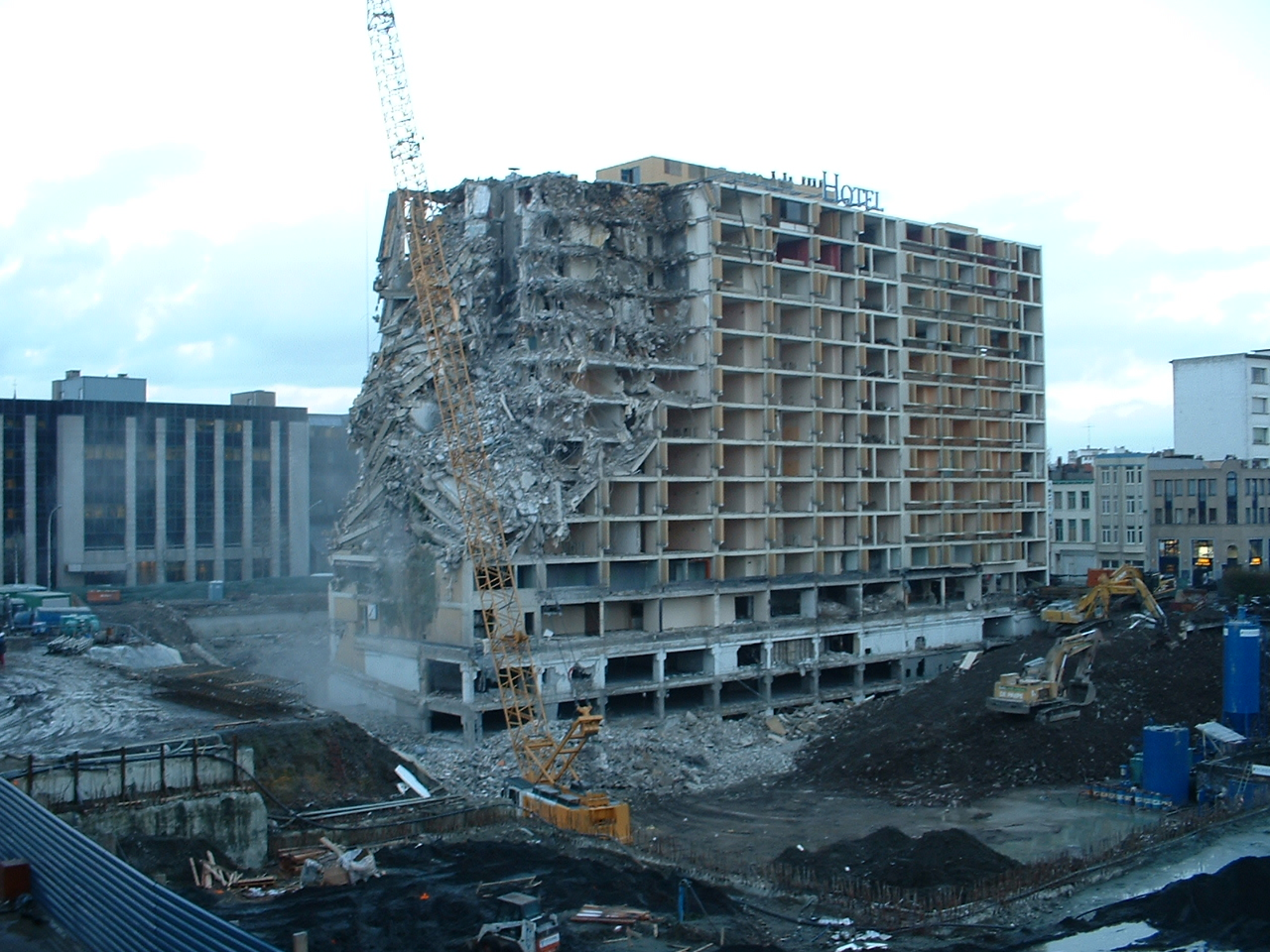
- The Switel Hotel during its demolition in 2004
- Date: 31 December 1994
- Venue: Switel Hotel
- Location: Antwerp, Belgium; 51°12′49.60″N 4°25′25.50″E
- Type: Fire
- Deaths: 15
- Injuries: 164

The Switel Hotel fire took place on 31 December 1994 during a New Year's Eve party in the Switel Hotel at the Kievitplein in Antwerp, Belgium.

== Fire ==
On New Year's Eve in 1994 about 450 guests were attending a party at the hotel. At about 22:50 a fire began in the Tenerife party hall when the party decorations caught fire. The fire destroyed the hall in only 30 seconds creating mass panic and confusion. Fifteen people died and 164 people were severely injured. An eyewitness stated that all of the lights went out, and another reported that; "From the entrance, among the Christmas trees, there suddenly was this great ball of fire that went through the room like a whirlwind."

Dutch singer Lee Towers was one of the guests at the party, he escaped unscathed but his wife Laura got severe burns. Twenty to twenty-five individuals were admitted into hospitals that night. A trumpet player who survived the fire, stated that they ran in the opposite direction of other victims, and managed to escape through the small kitchen in the rear of the ballroom.

== Aftermath ==
Luk Serré, the hotel's catering manager, was indicted for being responsible for the fire but later released from prosecution. Fifteen years later he released a book about his experiences.

In October 2003 a permit was issued for the demolition of the hotel. To better understand the fire and prevent future instances a report was created and published by researchers from Lund University.

== Literature ==
- (in Dutch) Serré, Luk, "Ik kreeg de schuld van de Switel-ramp", Uitgeverij Lampedaire, 2009.
