= Jean Des Roches =

Jan or Jean Des Roches (1740–1787) was a Dutch Republic-born educator, historian and linguist in the Austrian Netherlands.

== Life ==
Des Roches was born in The Hague in 1740 and was baptised at Voorburg on 1 March that year, with the baptismal record indicating his parents were not married. His mother, Louise Rottevrel, was in domestic service. Des Roches was apprenticed to a pastry chef, but spent as much time as he could reading.

In 1757 he read a newspaper advertisement for an assistant schoolmaster to teach Dutch in the countryside near Aalst and set off to apply. Arriving in Antwerp he was taken on in a primary school there, which was run by a German Augustinian who taught him Latin. In 1761 he published a Dutch grammar, Nieuwe nederduytsche spraek-konst, that went through three editions in the first year, and in 1763 a French grammar, Nieuwe fransche spraek-konst, which continued to be reprinted until 1801. The school where he was teaching closed in 1765, and Des Roches found employment as a private tutor.

On 13 April 1773 he became a member of the newly founded Imperial and Royal Academy of Brussels, on the strength of his publications on Belgian history, and in March 1776 he was appointed its permanent secretary. In 1777 he was also appointed secretary to the Commission Royale d'Études, set up to reform education in the Austrian Netherlands. In 1786 he travelled to Austria, where he spent six months visiting schools to learn about the new methods of education there. He returned to Brussels in March 1787 as Inspector General of Schools, but died on 20 May that year.

== Works ==
- Nieuwe Nederduytsche spraek-konst (1761)
- Nieuwe fransche spraek-konst (1763)
- Nieuw Nederduitsch en Frans woorden-boek (1769)
- Quels étaient les endroits compris dans l'étendue des contrées qui composent aujourd'hui les dix-sept provinces des Pays-Bas et le pays de Liège, qui pouvaient passer pour villes avant le VIIe siècle? (Brussels, imprimerie royale, 1770)
- Quels ont été, depuis le commencement du VIIe siècle jusqu'au IXe siècle exclusivement, les limites des différentes contrées, cantons, pays, comtés et états renfermés dans l'étendue qui compose aujourd'hui les dix-sept provinces des Pays-Bas et la principauté de Liége, pendant les Ve et VIe siècles? (1771)
- Quel a été l'état civil et ecclésiastique des dix-sept provinces des Pays-Bas et de la principauté de Liége, pendant les Ve et VIe siècles? (1772)
- Analyse du mémoire flamand de M. Verhoeven, qui a remporté (en 1777) le prix de la Question sur l'état des manufactures et du commerce des Pays-Bas, pendant le XIIIe et le XIVe siècle (1778)
- Grond-regels der grieksche tael (1779)
- De grond-regels der latynsche tale (1779)
- Lettre du secrétaire de l'Académie de Bruxelles à l'abbé De Bye, l'ancien des Bollandistes, au sujet de la réponse faite par ce dernier à un mémoire sur le testament de saint Remi (1780)
- Epitomes historiae belgicae (2 vols., 1782-1783)
- Prospectus d'une histoire générale des Pays-Bas autrichiens (1785)
- Histoire générale des Pays-Bas autrichiens (1787)
