= Forestry Incentive Program =

The Forestry Incentive Program (FIP), initiated in 1975 and administered by the Natural Resources Conservation Service, provided financial assistance for up to 65% of the cost of silvicultural activities on nonindustrial private forest land of generally less than 1,000 acres (405 ha). The program was terminated in the 2002 farm bill (P.L. 107-171), and replaced by the Forest Land Enhancement Program (FLEP).
