= Ghislenghien =

Section of Ath, Wallonia, Belgium

Coordinates: 50°39′N 3°52′E

Ghislenghien (Dutch: Gellingen; Picard: Guilinguin) is a small town of Wallonia and a district of the municipality of Ath, located in the province of Hainaut, Belgium. It has about 3000 inhabitants.

== Gas explosion ==
On 30 July 2004 a high-pressure natural gas pipeline operated at a pressure of 70 bar ruptured following recent third party damage. 24 people died as a result and 150 survivors were hospitalised, most with severe burns.

It is thought that damage to the pipeline occurred during the final stages of a car park construction project. Notice of the work had been given to the pipeline operator, Fluxys, and one of their operatives had regularly attended the site through the course of the project. Damage to the pipeline probably occurred as a mechanical soil stabiliser was driven over it or near by. This resulted in several evenly spaced (but not full depth) gouges in the steel wall of the pipeline. Two weeks after the completion of the car park gas pressure was increased in the pipeline, which then ruptured with the fault centred on a 350 mm long gouge. Other contributing factors to the accident may have been a reduced cover over the pipeline as a result of levelling, the way information was passed down the sub-contracting chain to workers and the frequency and adequacy of supervision by the pipeline operator at the site.

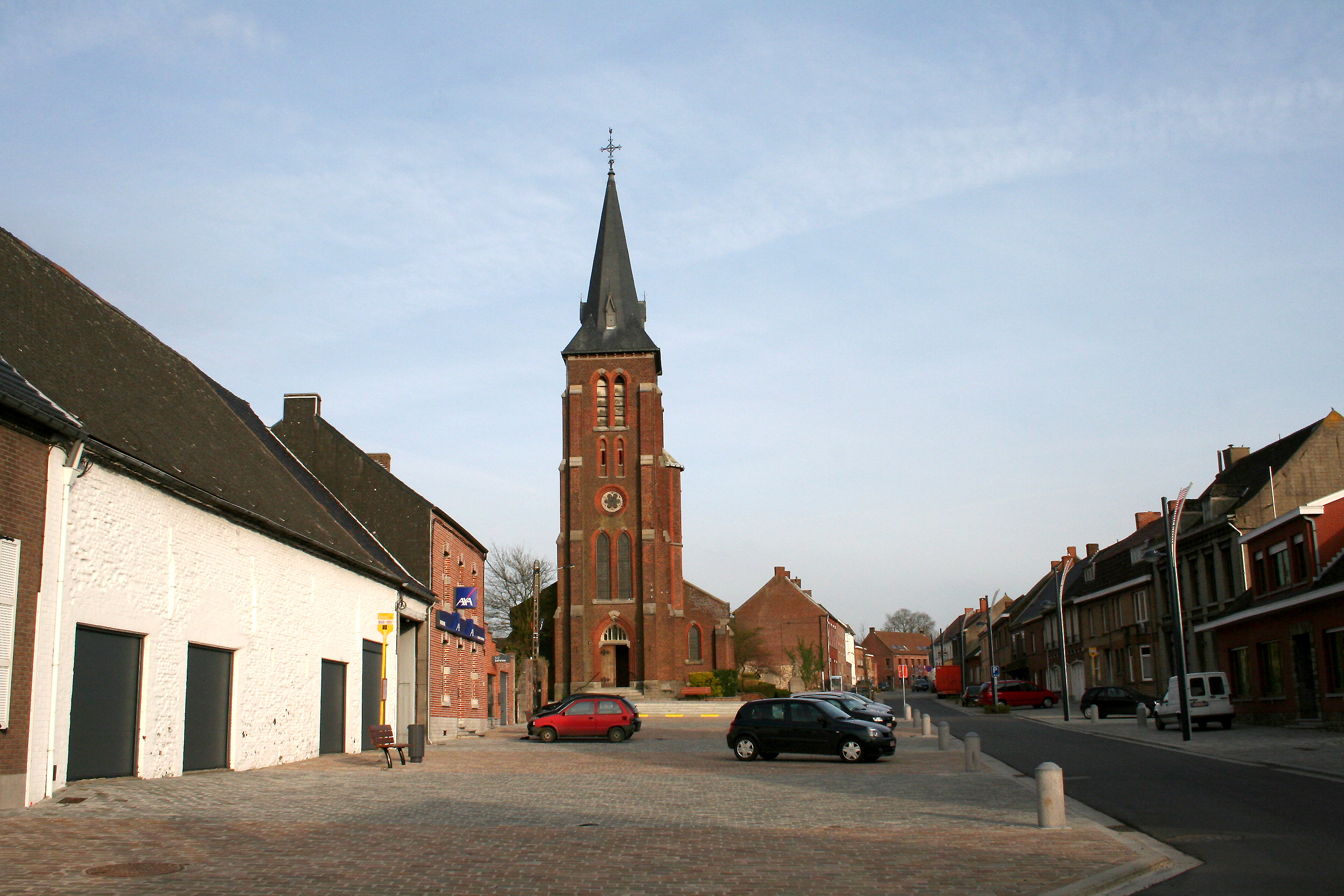
Ghislenghien, rue de Ghislenghien.
