= Jan Van Der Auwera =

Belgian footballer

Personal information
- Date of birth: 9 January 1924
- Place of birth: Belgium
- Date of death: 17 March 2004 (aged 80)
- Position: Defender

Senior career*
Years	Team	Apps	(Gls)
1947–1958	KRC Mechelen		

International career
1947–1958	Belgium	23	(0)
- * Club domestic league appearances and goals

Jan Van Der Auwera (9 January 1924 – 17 March 2004) was a Belgian footballer who played for KRC Mechelen and the Belgium national team.
