= Brasser =

Brasser is a Dutch and German occupational surname. "Brasser" in Middle Dutch meant "brewer" (as well as "boozer"), while the modern meaning is limited to the latter and "reveler" in general.

Notable people with this surname include:

- Govert Brasser (born 1956), Dutch sailor
- Reindert Brasser (1912–1999), Dutch athlete
