= General Council of Government =

The General Council of Government (French: Conseil du Gouvernement Général; Dutch: Algemene Regeringsraad) was an institution established in the Austrian Netherlands in 1787 in an attempt to replace the existing organs of central government, in particular the Collateral Councils. The purpose was to create a single body more amenable to implementing the policies of Emperor Joseph II. The abolition of the inherited system of government was one of the main causes of the Brabant Revolution. The council was to be chaired by Ludovico, Count of Belgiojoso, and include one representative from each of the main provinces of the Austrian Netherlands, in lieu of the provincial estates, which were also to be abolished.

The archives of the General Council of Government are now held in the National Archives of Belgium.

== Studies ==
- Joseph Lefèvre, Le Conseil du gouvernement général (Mémoires de la Classe des lettres, Académie royale des sciences, 23; 1928).
