= Renaat Bosschaert =

Belgian artist (1938–2006)

Renaat Bosschaert (1938–2006) was a Belgian artist working in painting, graphic arts, sculpture, ceramic arts, engraving and printmaking.

== Biography ==
Renaat Bosschaert was born in Belgium on 18 November 1938, at Ostend. He studied in Brussels at the Academie Royale des Beaux-Arts.

From 1977 he sold his graphic works, paintings and publications at his house in Bruges, where he had two 19th-century iron presses and a lithographic press.

He is noted for his small-run, large-format art folios, which feature his engravings, woodcuts and typography , pulled by hand in his studio. He published illustrated limited editions of works by historic Belgian authors Guido Gezelle and Felix Timmermans, and produced work with local and contemporary writers such as Anton van Wilderode. His works are in the collections of the Royal Library of Belgium and the university libraries of Brussels and Antwerp. In 2002, when Bruges was designated a 'European cultural capital', he printed and published, Zeven Brugse dichters 2002, in which each poem is accompanied by one of Bosschaert's lino-cuts.

Renaat Bosschaert died on 30 December 2006. His daughter, Greet, is an illustrator of children's books.
