= Financial Intelligence & Processing =

French finance firm

- Type: International Cooperative
- Industry: Professional services
- Founded: 2005, by Marc Hürner
- Headquarters: Brussels, Paris, Geneva
- Area served: Worldwide
- Key people: Marc Hürner (Switzerland), Hervé Zany (Paris)
- Services: Financial intelligence and Business intelligence
- Website: www.fipcor.com

Financial Intelligence & Processing (FIP) is an international firm based in Paris offering financial and business intelligence.

In 2011 and 2012, FIP was listed among the top experts of financial fraud investigation in France, just after KPMG, as assessed by Décideurs Stratégie Finance Droit in the "Risk Management, Insurance and Litigation" yearly guide.

== Structure ==
FIP was formed in 2005 by combining the skills of experts in the areas of financial engineering, fraud examination and investigation. FIP relies on the skills and experiences of its consultant teams spread across its three European locations (Brussels, Paris and Geneva). It has built an international network of correspondents leading them to work in jurisdictions such as China, DR Congo, Dubai, the USA, Guinea, Iraq, Morocco, Russia, Turkey or Vietnam.

Among others, their experience led them to work for the heiress of the Agnelli empire and to look for the "secretive treasures" of her father, Gianni Agnelli.

FLS was cited in the "affaire AEF-Ockrent".

== Direction ==
Called the "James Bond of financial circuits", Marc Hürner founded FIP to provide clients with his experience (in Ernst & Young, KPMG among others) and investigative skills in all matters related to the prevention and detection of fraud, tax evasion schemes and counterfeit, and the reinforcement of internal controls.

== Services ==
- Fraud and Corruption Risk Management: Preventive audit of the financial risks of corruption, fraud and money laundering; internal fraud investigation, damage valuation, litigation support, and asset search.
- Financial Intelligence: Investigation of schemes of asset diversion, corruption or money laundering, and situations of breach of contract, material misrepresentations or conflict of interest; innovative financial strategies to address financial crime, in particular counterfeit; design and implementation of specific action plans; business valuation, business plan review and financial engineering; consulting services to investors and senior executives in situations of external growth operations or hostile takeovers.
- Damage Valuation: Commercial dispute; fraud; intellectual property violations
- Computer Forensics led by experts group from Forensic & Legal Services (FLS): Forensic analysis on any computer systems and digital storage media; expert statement either on-site or at the FLS lab, evidence-preserving copy of media, assistance in meetings with adverse parties; Technical Surveillance Counter-Measures; computer security audits. FIP participated on this matter to the first Belgian Conference on Strategic Intelligence in 2010 by speaking about computer and data security.

== See also ==
- Financial intelligence
- Due diligence
