= Raymond van Uytven =

Belgian medievalist (1933–2018)

- Born: February 1, 1933; Leuven, Belgium
- Died: December 20, 2018 (aged 85); Halle-Booienhoven, Zoutleeuw, Belgium
- Known for: Research on the Duchy of Brabant and medieval urban economy

Academic background
- Education: KU Leuven

Academic work
- Discipline: Medieval history, economic history, urban history
- Institutions: University of Antwerp, KU Leuven
- Notable works: De zinnelijke middeleeuwen, Production and Consumption in the Low Countries, Geschiedenis van de dorst

Raymond van Uytven (1 February 1933 – 20 December 2018) was a Belgian medievalist, a specialist in the economic and urban history of the medieval Duchy of Brabant, who was a professor at the University of Antwerp and the University of Leuven.

== Life ==
Van Uytven studied at the Catholic University of Leuven. He earned a Ph.D. in 1959 with a thesis on the city finances and urban economy of Leuven between the 12th and 16th centuries. After a number of years working at the National Archives of Belgium, he obtained a university appointment. A Festschrift was published at his retirement in 1998. He died at home in Halle-Booienhoven (Zoutleeuw) on 20 December 2018.

== Publications ==
- "Splendour or Wealth: Art and Economy in the Burgundian Netherlands", Transactions of the Cambridge Bibliographical Society, 10:2 (1992), pp. 101–123.
- De zinnelijke middeleeuwen (1998)
- "Showing off one's rank in the Middle Ages", in Showing Status: Representation of Social Positions in the Late Middle Ages, edited by Wim Blockmans (Turnhout, 1999), pp. 19–34.
- Studies over Brabantse kloostergeschiedenis (Brussels, Algemeen Rijksarchief, 1999)
- Production and Consumption in the Low Countries, 13th-16th Centuries (2001)
- De papegaai van de paus (2003)
- as editor: Geschiedenis van Brabant van het hertogdom tot heden (2004)
- Geschiedenis van de dorst: Twintig eeuwen drinken in de Lage Landen (2007)
- Smaken verschillen (2010)
