= Xavier Mabille =

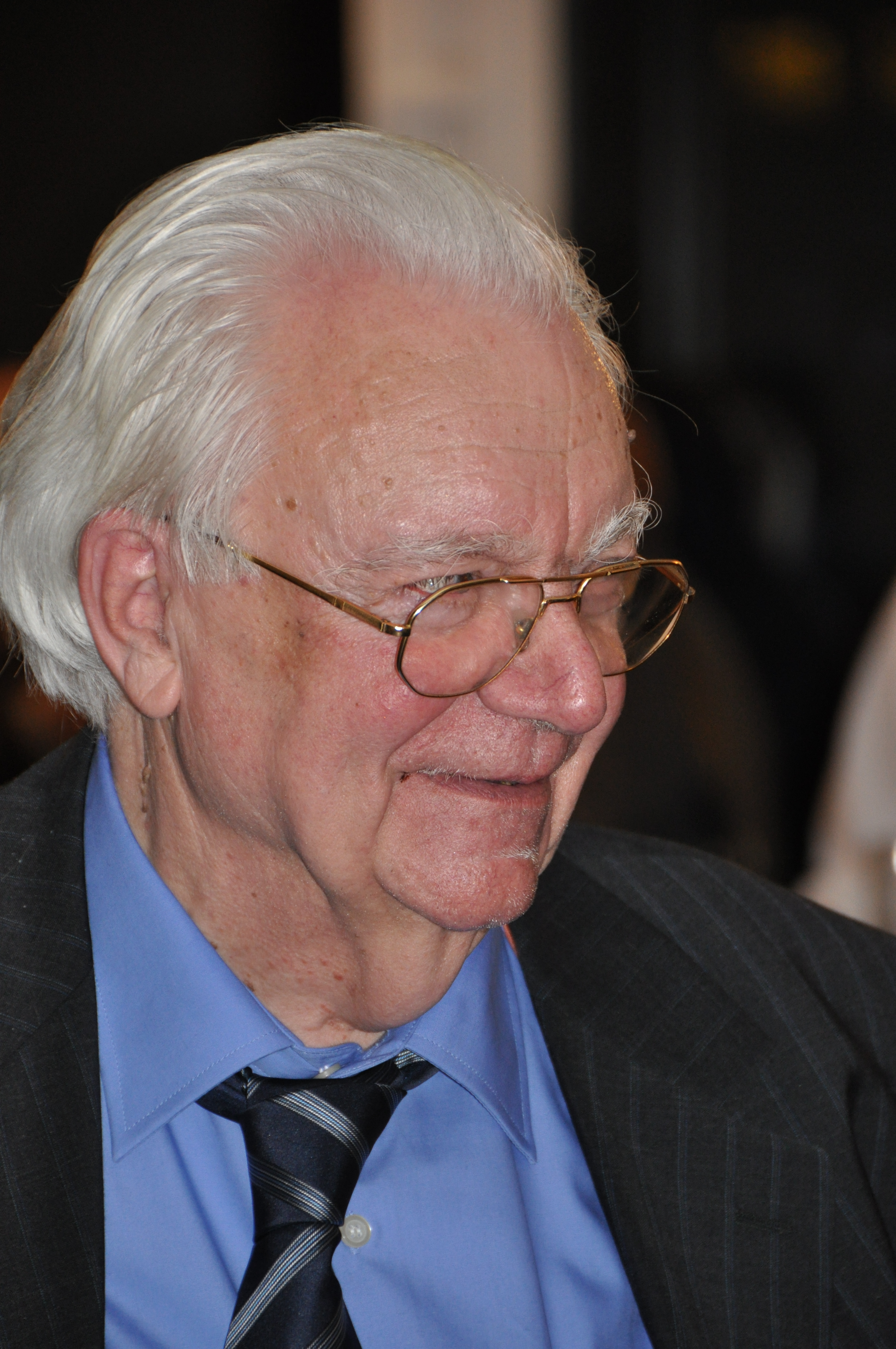
Xavier Mabille (2009)

Xavier Mabille (3 July 1933 – 24 December 2012) was a Belgian historian and political scientist. He served as President of the Belgium-based Centre de recherche et d'information socio-politiques (CRISP or Centre for Socio-Political Research) in Brussels. In the 1990s, he was a notable political commentator in Belgium. He was born in July 1933 in Anderlecht and died in December 2012 at the age of 79.
