= Jean-Luc Dehaene =

Prime Minister of Belgium from 1992 until 1999

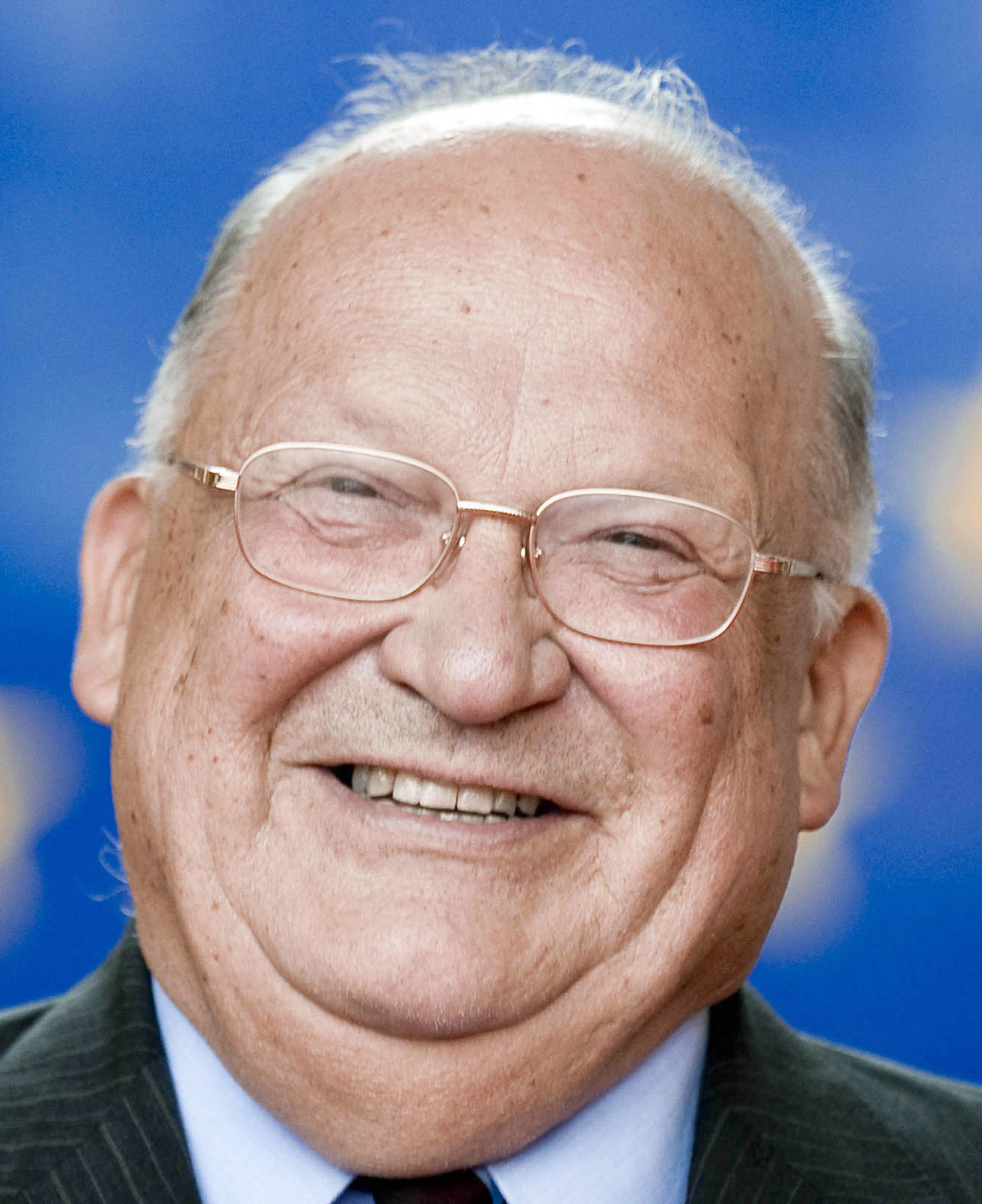
- Dehaene in 2009

Prime Minister of Belgium
- In office 7 March 1992 – 12 July 1999
- Monarchs: Baudouin; Albert II
- Preceded by: Wilfried Martens
- Succeeded by: Guy Verhofstadt

Personal details
- Born: Jean Luc Joseph Marie Dehaene; 7 August 1940 Montpellier, Vichy France
- Died: 15 May 2014 (aged 73) Quimper, France
- Party: Christian Democratic and Flemish (CD&V)
- Spouse: Celie Verbeke
- Children: 4
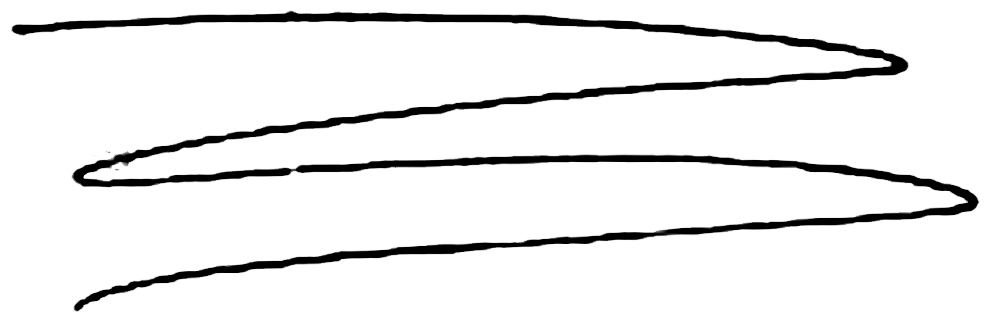
- Signature

Jean Luc Joseph Marie "Jean-Luc" Dehaene (Flemish: [ʑɑ̃ːˈlyɡ dəˈɦaːnə]; 7 August 1940 – 15 May 2014) was a Belgian politician who served as the prime minister of Belgium from 1992 until 1999. During his political career, he was nicknamed "The Plumber", as well as "The Minesweeper", for his ability to negotiate political deadlocks.

A member of the Christen-Democratisch en Vlaams (CD&V) party and its antecedents, Dehaene gained his first ministerial appointment in 1981. Dehaene later went on to lead a series of centre-left cabinets from 1992 to 1999. Dehaene's first government (1992–1995) included both Christian and Social Democrats and presided over the creation of a new constitution, effectively transforming Belgium into a federal state. His second government (1995–1999) coincided with a number of crises in Belgium, including the Dutroux scandal. The Dioxin Affair, occurring shortly before the 1999 election, led to a swing against the major parties, and Dehaene's government fell.

Following his final term as prime minister, he was active in both Belgian and European politics. He was also on UEFA's financial fair play regulatory body and managed Dexia Bank during the 2008 financial crisis. He was the last prime minister of King Baudouin's reign.

== Early life and political career ==
Dehaene was born on 7 August 1940 in Montpellier, France, when his parents were fleeing the advance of the German army into Belgium and France. During his studies at the Université de Namur and the Katholieke Universiteit Leuven, he was a member of the Olivaint Conference of Belgium. He got into politics through the Algemeen Christelijk Werknemersverbond (General Christian Workers' Union; ACW), a trade union which was closely linked to the Christelijke Volkspartij (Christian People's Party; CVP).

Dehaene's long-time wife Celie Verbeke is a native of Illinois in the United States but both her paternal and maternal grandparents were Belgian immigrants. Since she was raised by her parents in Dutch and speaks without a foreign accent, the Belgian public remained unaware of her American background for a long time.

Dehaene was a keen football fan and viewed it as an important part of Belgian national identity. He was a supporter of Club Brugge K.V. In 1981, he became Minister of Social Affairs and Institutional Reform, a position he held until 1988, when he became Deputy Prime Minister and Minister of Communications and Institutional Reform.

== Prime Minister of Belgium ==
=== Dehaene I (1992–95) ===
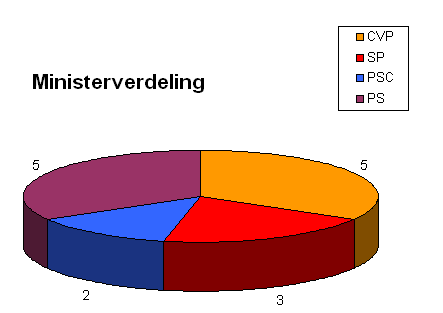
Make-up of the Dehaene I government by party

In 1992, after both Guy Verhofstadt and Melchior Wathelet had failed, Dehaene managed to form a governing coalition of Christian Democrats and Social Democrats. This became one of Belgium's most important governments because it successfully transformed Belgium into a federal state in 1993. In March 1993, Dehaene offered the King the resignation of his government, because of diverging views on how to handle the public finances. However, within a week, the differences were put aside.

After the death of King Baudouin on 31 July 1993, Dehaene's government exercised the royal function until Prince Albert was sworn in as King Albert II nine days later.

In 1994, Dehaene ordered the unilateral withdrawal of Belgian troops from Rwanda following the massacre of a number of Belgian peacekeepers, thus lifting the last barrier to the genocide of Tutsis. During questions from the Belgian parliamentary commission into this decision he repeatedly acknowledged no regrets about the decision. He was the leading candidate to replace Jacques Delors as President of the European Commission, but British Prime Minister John Major vetoed the appointment. The Luxembourg Prime Minister Jacques Santer was appointed as a compromise candidate instead.

=== Dehaene II (1995–99) ===
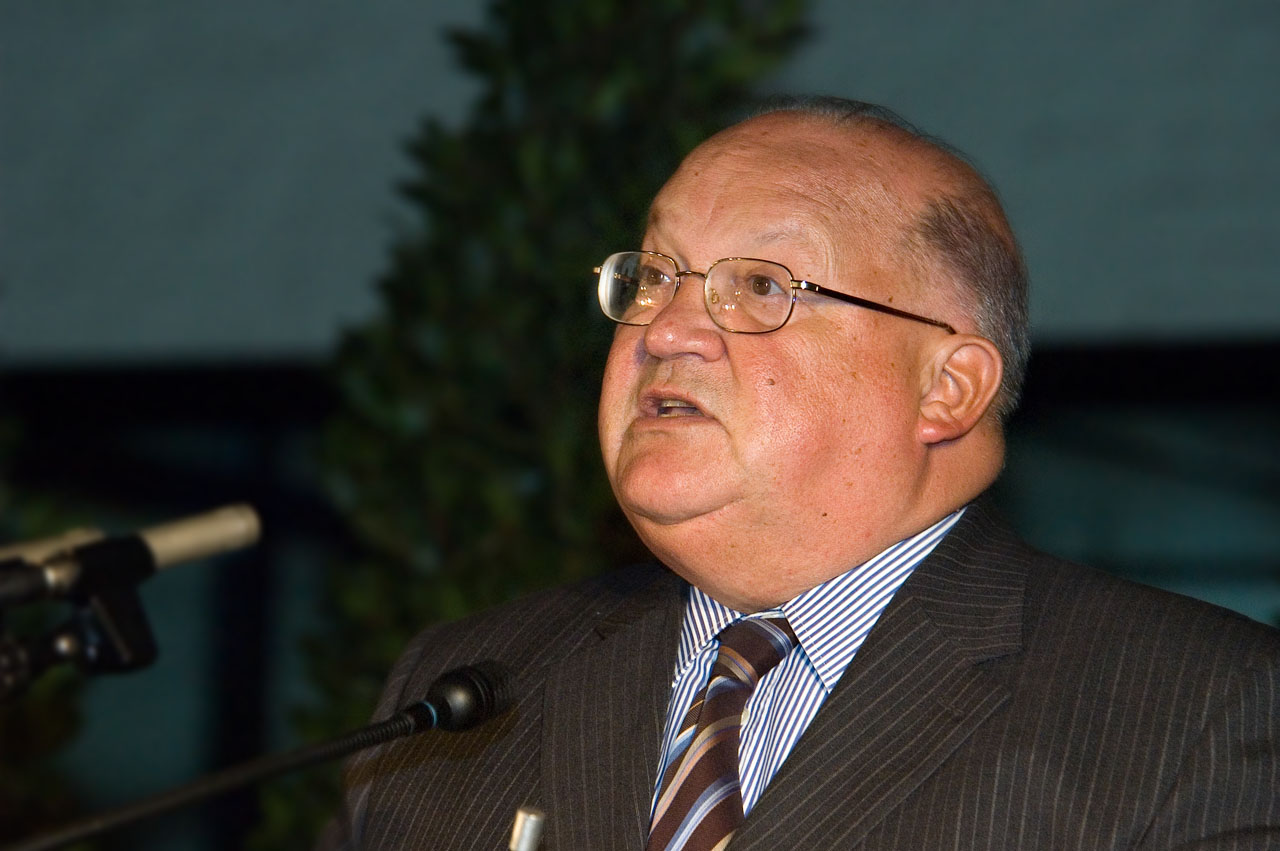
Jean-Luc Dehaene giving a speech in 2005

Dehaene's second government was also composed of Christian Democrats and Social Democrats. Despite the fact that the government was marked by a number of political crises and scandals, most notably the Dutroux affair, it managed to serve the entire legislature. During this period, for his work toward a unified Europe, Dehaene received the Vision for Europe Award in 1996. Dehaene led Belgium into the Euro, and in preparation for joining the Eurozone, the Dehaene government was forced to make some sharp and unpopular economic reforms. Some weeks before the 1999 elections, the dioxin affair erupted, and both governing parties lost much of their support. He was replaced by a new government, led by Flemish liberal Guy Verhofstadt.

== After 1999 ==
=== Later political career ===
Between 2000 and 2007, he sat as Burgemeester (mayor) of Vilvoorde. At the request of his party, the CD&V, he was once again put up as a candidate during the 2003 elections, but this was clearly not with the intention of becoming prime minister as he was placed as the last person on the party list (Lijstduwer). In June 2004 and again in June 2009, Jean-Luc Dehaene was elected to the European Parliament for the CD&V within the center-right European People's Party (EPP) group. In 2003, he was awarded the Vlerick Award.

Between 2006 and 2007, Dehaene served as member of the Amato Group, a group of high-level European politicians unofficially working on rewriting the Treaty establishing a Constitution for Europe into what became known as the Treaty of Lisbon following its rejection by French and Dutch voters. After the Belgian elections of 2007, Dehaene was appointed as mediator in the process to form a new government. He was also called in to assist in the negotiations around the Brussels-Halle-Vilvoorde partition.

=== UEFA Financial Fair Play ===
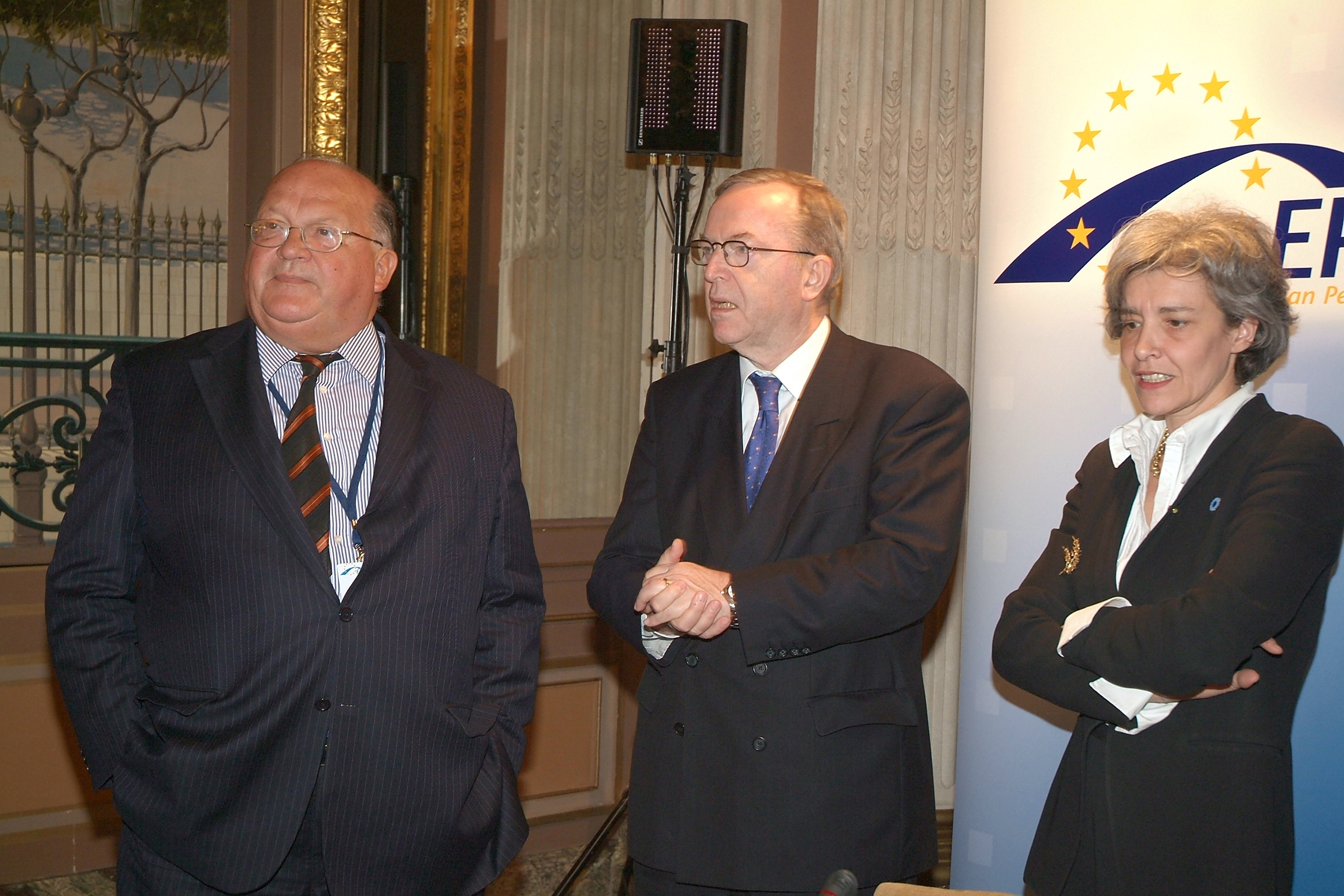
Jean-Luc Dehaene (left) with Wilfried Martens (center) at a European People's Party (EPP) meeting, 2005

Dehaene also served as the chief enforcer of the football association, UEFA's, Financial Fair Play (FFP). In 2011, he was involved in an investigation of Manchester City F.C. over sponsorship irregularities.

=== Dexia ===
Dehaene, who had previously been director of InBev, became chairman of Dexia Bank, a Belgian-French bank, in October 2008. With the bank in difficulty owing to the 2008 financial crisis, he was asked to lead the company through the difficult period which he described as "mission impossible". Owing to his extensive political background, it was thought that he could cope with the negative public perception Dexia had acquired through the 2008 financial crisis. His political connections helped Dexia's bad bank to secure funding guarantees of up to €90 billion, provided primarily by the Belgian government. In 2012, Dexia Belgium became Belfius.

== Death ==
On 15 May 2014, Dehaene died after a fall while holidaying in Quimper in France. He had been diagnosed with pancreatic cancer earlier the same year and was not seeking reelection as an MEP in the 2014 elections for health reasons. He was 73 years old.

In the aftermath of his death, he received tributes from the incumbent Belgian Prime Minister Elio Di Rupo who described him as an "exceptional statesman". Tributes were also made by Guy Verhofstadt, President of the European Parliament Martin Schulz and President of the European Commission José Manuel Barroso.

His body lay in state in Vilvoorde's town hall, and the retired King Albert II and the Flemish Minister-President Kris Peeters both visited Vilvoorde to pay their respects.

== Honours ==
- Belgium: Minister of State, by Royal Decree.
- Belgium: Grand Cross of the Order of the Crown.
- Germany: Grand Cross in the Order of Merit of the Federal Republic of Germany.
- Uruguay: Medal of the Oriental Republic of Uruguay.

== Publications ==
- Sleutels voor morgen, Esopus, Hasselt, 1995, 111 p. ISBN 978-90-802524-1-7
- Sporen naar 2000, Icarus, Antwerp, 1999, 173 p. ISBN 978-90-02-20925-3
- Er is nog leven na de 16, Van Halewyck, Leuven, 2002, 208 p. ISBN 978-90-5617-411-8
- De Europese Uitdaging: van uitbreiding tot integratie, Van Halewyck, Leuven, 2004, 237 p. ISBN 978-90-5617-564-1

Political offices
Preceded by Wilfried Martens	Prime Minister of Belgium; 1992–1999	Succeeded by Guy Verhofstadt
