= List of Belgian monarchs =

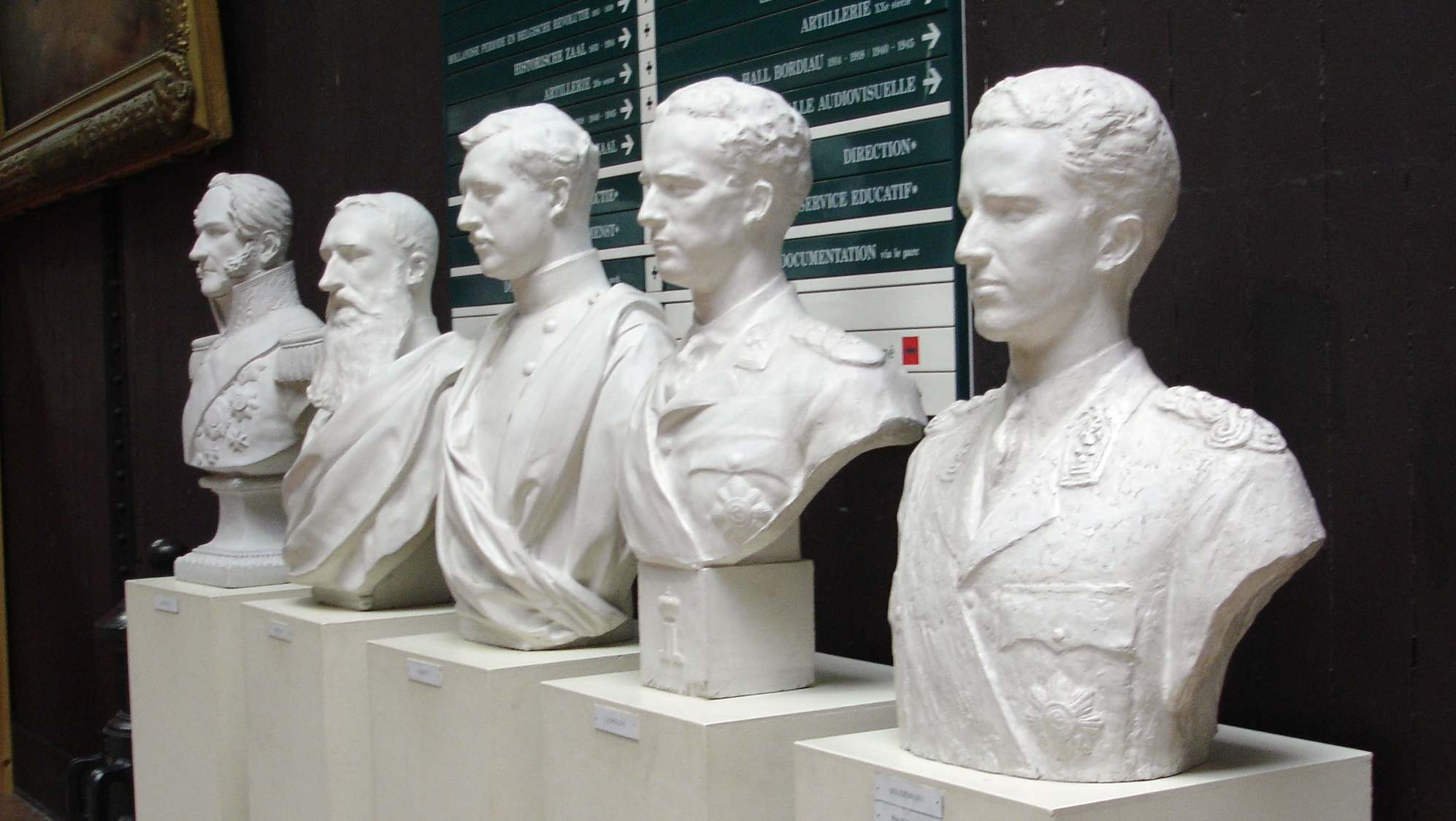
Sculptural busts of the first five Monarchs of Belgium in the Royal Museum of the Armed Forces

This is a list of Belgian monarchs from 1831 when the first Belgian king, Leopold I, ascended the throne, after Belgium seceded from the Kingdom of the Netherlands during the Belgian Revolution of 1830.

Under the Belgian Constitution, the Belgian monarch is styled "King of the Belgians" (French: Roi des Belges, Dutch: Koning der Belgen, German: König der Belgier) rather than "King of Belgium" in order to reflect the monarchy's constitutional and popular function.

Since 1831, there have been seven Kings of the Belgians and two regents.

== List ==
Name	Portrait	Birth and death	Reign started	Reign ended	Marriages	Succession right
Érasme-Louis, Baron Surlet de Chokier regent		27 November 1769; Liège (Prince-Bishopric of Liège) – 7 August 1839; Gingelom (aged 69)	25 February 1831	21 July 1831 (146 days)		Chosen by the National Congress
Leopold I		16 December 1790; Saxe-Coburg-Saalfeld (Holy Roman Empire) – 10 December 1865; Laeken (aged 74)	21 July 1831	10 December 1865 (34 years, 142 days)	(1) Charlotte of Wales ⚭ 2 May 1816 [1 child (stillborn)] (2) Louise of Orléans ⚭ 9 August 1832 [4 children]	Elected by the National Congress
Leopold II		9 April 1835; Brussels – 17 December 1909; Laeken (aged 74)	17 December 1865	17 December 1909 (44 years, 0 days)	Marie-Henriette of Austria ⚭ 22 August 1853 [4 children]	Son of Leopold I
Albert I		8 April 1875; Brussels – 17 February 1934; Marche-les-Dames (aged 58)	23 December 1909	17 February 1934 (24 years, 56 days)	Elisabeth of Bavaria ⚭ 2 October 1900 [3 children]	Nephew of Leopold II / Grandson of Leopold I
Leopold III		3 November 1901; Brussels – 25 September 1983; Woluwe-Saint-Lambert (aged 81)	23 February 1934	16 July 1951 (abdicated) (17 years, 143 days)	(1) Astrid of Sweden ⚭ 4 November 1926 [3 children] (2) Lilian Baels ⚭ 6 December 1941 [3 children]	Son of Albert I
Charles / Karel prince regent for Leopold III		10 October 1903; Brussels – 1 June 1983; Raversijde (aged 79)	21 September 1944	20 July 1950 (5 years, 302 days)	Unmarried [childless]	Son of Albert I / Brother of Leopold III
Baudouin / Boudewijn		7 September 1930; Laeken – 31 July 1993; Motril (Spain) (aged 62)	17 July 1951	31 July 1993 (42 years, 13 days)	Fabiola of Mora and Aragón ⚭ 15 December 1960 [childless]	Son of Leopold III
Albert II		6 June 1934; Laeken (age 92)	9 August 1993	21 July 2013 (abdicated) (19 years, 346 days)	Paola of Calabria ⚭ 2 July 1959 [3 children]	Son of Leopold III / Brother of Baudouin
Philippe / Filip		15 April 1960; Laeken (age 66)	21 July 2013	Incumbent (13 years, 22 days)	Mathilde d'Udekem d'Acoz ⚭ 4 December 1999 [4 children]	Son of Albert II

== See also ==
- Monarchy of Belgium
- Family tree of Belgian monarchs
- List of Belgian royal consorts
- Succession to the Belgian throne
- Crown Council of Belgium
