= List of members of the Walloon Parliament, 1999–2004 =

This is a list of members of the Walloon Parliament between 1999 and 2004, following the direct elections of 1999.

== Composition ==
Party	Seats	+/–
Socialist Party (Parti Socialiste, PS)	25	▼5
Liberal Reformist Party (Parti Réformateur Libéral, PRL)	21	▲2
Ecolo (ECOLO)	14	▲6
Christian Social Party (Parti Social Chrétien, PSC)	14	▼2
National Front (Front National, FN)	1	▼1
	75	

== By party ==
=== PS (25) ===
1. Patrick Avril replaced Laurette Onkelinx (16.7.99)
2. Maurice Bayenet, leader
3. Richard Biefnot
4. Maurice Bodson
5. Robert Collignon, président du parlement (àpd 5.4.00)
6. Frédéric Daerden replaced José Happart (ministre-16.7.99)
7. Freddy Deghilage
8. Marc de Saint Moulin replaced Willy Taminiaux (7.2.2001)
9. Nicole Docq replaced Bernard Anselme (31.1.01)
10. Paul Ficheroulle replaced Jean-Claude Van Cauwenberghe (ministre-12.7.99)
11. Didier Donfut
12. Michel Filleul replaced Christian Dupont (24.9.03)
13. Paul Furlan
14. Gil Gilles
15. Gustave Hofman
16. Jean-François Istasse
17. Jean-Marie Léonard
18. Robert Meureau
19. Jean Namotte
20. André Navez
21. Jean-Pierre Perdieu
22. Francis Poty
23. Edmund Stoffels
24. Pierre Wacquier remplace Annick Saudoyer (5.6.03) replaced Christian Massy (12.3.01), who replaced Rudy Demotte (17.1.01 et ministre 16.7.99–4.4.00)
25. Léon Walry

=== PRL (21) ===
1. Claude Ancion
2. Chantal Bertouille, leader (jusque 16.9.01)
3. Jean Bock
4. Pierre Boucher
5. Véronique Cornet
6. André Damseaux
7. Jean-Pierre Dardenne
8. Christine Defraigne replaced Michel Foret (ministre-16.7.99)
9. Philippe Fontaine, chef de groupe (àpd 16.9.01)
10. Claudy Huart replaced Jean-Pierre Dauby(†) (24.4.00)
11. Michel Joiret replaced Hervé Jamar (14.7.03), who replaced Pierre Hazette (31.12.00)
12. Michel Huin
13. Gérard Mathieu
14. Richard Miller, replaced by Pierre Fortez (17.1.01–6.6.03)
15. Marcel Neven
16. Jacques Otlet replaced Serge Kubla (ministre-12.7.99)
17. Florine Pary-Mille
18. Guy Saulmont
19. Annie Servais-Thysen
20. Jean-Marie Séverin (ministre-12.7.99–17.10.00 : replaced by Patrick Bioul)
21. Jean-Paul Wahl

=== ECOLO (14) ===
1. Marie-Rose Cavalier-Bohon replaced Philippe Defeyt (26.1.00)
2. Marcel Cheron
3. Xavier Desgain, leader
4. Michel Guilbert
5. Jean-Claude Hans replaced Jean-Michel Javaux (24.9.03)
6. Pierre Hardy
7. Philippe Henry
8. Daniel Josse
9. Alain Pieters replaced Nicole Maréchal (31.12.00)
10. Daniel Smeets
11. Luc Tiberghien
12. Alain Trussart replaced Marc Hordies (17.9.02)
13. Monique Vlaminck-Moreau
14. Bernard Wesphael

=== PSC (14) ===
1. André Antoine, leader
2. André Bouchat
3. Christian Brotcorne replaced Georges Seneca(†) (20.11.02)
4. Philippe Charlier
5. Anne-Marie Corbisier-Hagon
6. Michel de Lamotte replaced William Ancion (21.2.01)
7. Jacques Étienne
8. Guy Hollogne
9. Elmar Keutgen
10. Michel Lebrun
11. Albert Liénard
12. André Namotte replaced Ghislain Hiance (24.4.01)
13. Pierre Scharff
14. René Thissen

=== FN (1) ===
Representative	Electoral district
Alain Sadaune	Hainaut
