= 2018 in Belgium =

- Decades: 1990s; 2000s; 2010s; 2020s
- See also: Other events of 2018; List of years in Belgium

Events in the year 2018 in Belgium.

== Incumbents ==
- Monarch: Philippe
- Prime Minister: Charles Michel

== Events ==
January

- 1 January
  - border change along the Meuse between Belgium and the Netherlands takes effect
  - The entire Brussels-Capital Region becomes a low-emission zone
- 13 January — Angeline Flor Pua wins Miss Belgium 2018

February

- 3 February — Insyriated wins in six categories at the 8th Magritte Awards, including Best Film and Best Director

March

- 17 March — Standard Liège wins 2018 Belgian Cup Final

April

- 1 April — 102nd Tour of Flanders
- 18 April — 82nd Flèche Wallonne

May

- 17 May — 2-year-old Mawda Shawri killed by a police bullet
- 29 May — Two police officers and a civilian bystander killed in 2018 Liège attack

July

- 2 July — A Belgian man and his Iranian wife were arrested after plotting a bomb attack against a Mujahedeen Khalq rally in France.

August

- 31 August — Summer of 2018 is the hottest in almost 200 years

October

- 14 October – Local elections

December

- 5 December – Belgium's first recorded death by hazing: the 20-year-old KU Leuven student Sanda Dia dies after taking part in the initiation ceremony for the subsequently disbanded Reuzegom fraternity.
- 9 December – a political crisis emerged over whether to sign the Global Compact for Migration; in an N-VA u-turn the party opposed signing whereas the other three parties in government continued to support it. On 4 December the Prime Minister of Belgium, Charles Michel, announced that the issue would be taken to parliament for a vote. On 5 December, parliament voted 106 to 36 in favor of backing the agreement. Michel stated that he would endorse the pact on behalf of the parliament, not on behalf of the divided government. Consequently, N-VA left the government; the other three parties continue as a minority government (Michel II).
- 16 December – More than 5,500 people marched in a protest against the Global Compact for Migration, organized by Flemish right-wing parties. A smaller counter-demonstration of around 1,000 people was organised by left-wing groups.
- 18 December – Prime Minister Charles Michel presented his government's resignation to the King, who accepted it a few days later.

== Deaths ==
=== January ===
- 12 January: Léon Ritzen, 78, footballer
- 18 January: Luc Beyer de Ryke, 84, journalist and politician
- 26 January: Alfred Léonard, 77, politician
- 30 January: Terry Van Ginderen, aka Tante Terry, 86, TV presenter (Kom Toch Eens Kijken).

=== February ===
- 4 February: Nat Neujean, 95, sculptor
- 8 February: Paul Danblon, 86, composer, opera director and administrator, and journalist
- 10 February: Walter Boucquet, 76, cyclist
- 12 February: Jef Geys, 83, artist
- 28 February: Amand Dalem, 89, politician

=== March ===
- 28 March: Eugène Van Roosbroeck, 89, racing cyclist
- 31 March: Frank Aendenboom, 76, stage, movie and television actor

=== April ===
- 5 April: Raymonda Vergauwen, 90, Dutch breaststroke swimmer
- 8 April: Michael Goolaerts, 23, cyclist
- 17 April: Gérard Desanghere, 70, footballer

=== May ===
- 6 May: Eric Geboers, 55, motocross and racing driver.
- 7 May: Maurane, 57, pop singer and actress
- 14 May: William Vance, 82, comics artist (Bruno Brazil, XIII)
- 14 May: Jacky Buchmann, 86, politician

=== June ===
- 21 June: Édouard-Jean Empain, 80, industrialist.

=== October ===
- 3 October: Hugo Raspoet, 77, singer and guitarist (Helena, Evviva Il Papa).
- 5 October: Walter Capiau, 80, TV presenter.
- 8 October: Eliane Liekendael, 90, magistrate.

=== December ===
- 3 December: Albert Frère, 92, businessman.
- 14 December: Jean-Pierre Van Rossem, 73, economist, politician and criminal.
- 20 December: Raymond van Uytven, 85, academic historian
