= 2022 in Belgium =

- Decades: 2000s; 2010s; 2020s
- See also: Other events of 2022; List of years in Belgium

Events in the year 2022 in Belgium.

== Incumbents ==
- Monarch: Philippe
- Prime Minister: Alexander De Croo

== Events ==
Ongoing – COVID-19 pandemic in Belgium

- 3 January - The Belgian government finalizes an agreement to buy 20,000 courses of Pfizer's Paxlovid COVID-19 drug and Merck & Co.'s Molnupiravir COVID-19 drug.
- 20 January - Nineteen-year-old Belgian-British pilot Zara Rutherford returns to Kortrijk, Belgium, to complete her five-month circumnavigation, becoming the youngest female pilot to fly solo around the world.
- 18 February - Two people are killed as Storm Eunice impacts northwestern Europe. Millions are also left without power.
- 7 March - Belgium removes most of its COVID-19-related restrictions, including lifting most of mask mandate and no longer requiring COVID Safe Tickets to enter most public places, after the country lowered its COVID-19 barometer from code orange to yellow.
- 20 March - A car is driven into a crowd preparing to celebrate carnival in Strépy-Bracquegnies, killing six people and injuring around 40 others.
- 29 March - Belgium joins the Netherlands, Ireland and the Czech Republic in expelling Russian diplomats due to the invasion of Ukraine,
- 20 May - Belgium, and the Netherlands confirm their first cases of monkeypox.
- 22 May - Belgium becomes the first country to introduce a monkeypox quarantine.
- 8 June - King Philippe of Belgium, in a speech to the Congolese parliament in Kinshasa, formally condemns the atrocities that occurred when the Democratic Republic of the Congo was declared the personal property of his great-great granduncle, Leopold II of Belgium, saying that the colonial government "was one of unequal relations, unjustifiable in itself, marked by paternalism, discrimination and racism".
- 20 June - The Belgian government repatriates Congolese independence leader and former prime minister Patrice Lumumba's remains, consisting of a tooth, through an official ceremony attended by his family at the Egmont Palace in Brussels.
- 20 September – Episcopal Conference of Belgium publishes a suggested ritual for blessing stable same-sex unions.
- 10 November - A police officer is killed and another is wounded during the 2022 Brussels stabbing at a train station in Brussels, Belgium. The perpetrator is killed.
- 30 November – Jury selection begins in the trial of 10 suspects of the 2016 Brussels bombings, the largest court case in Belgian history.

== Art and literature ==
- 4 March – Release of Multitude, Stromae's third album, making it his first since 2013.

== Deaths ==
- 2 January - Eric Walter Elst, Astronomer (b.1936)
- 11 January - Evence-Charles Coppée, press director (b. 1953)
- 11 January - Louis Dupré, Religious philosopher (b.1925)
- 12 January - Marc Janson, painter (b. 1930)
- 13 January - Fred Van Hove, Jazz musician (b. 1937)
- 14 January - Alice von Hildebrand, Philosopher (b.1923)
- 17 January - Michel Konen, journalist (b. 1950)
- 20 January - Carla Galle, Olympic swimmer (b. 1948)
- 29 January - Freddy Thielemans, politician (b. 1944)
- 30 January - Frans Aerenhouts, cyclist (b. 1937)
- 1 February - Jan Callewaert, businessman (b. 1956)
- 7 February - Jacques Calonne, artist (b. 1930)
- 11 February - Philippe van Kessel, actor (b. 1946)
- 15 February - Roger Lambrecht, businessman and footballer (b.1931)
- 17 February - André Messelis, road racing cyclist (b. 1931)
- 19 February - Monique Hanotte, resistance member (b. 1920)
- 10 March - Georges Ginoux, politician (b. 1933)
- 11 March - Frank De Coninck, diplomat (b. 1945)
- 29 March - Miguel Van Damme, footballer (b. 1993)
- 30 March - Willy Vanden Berghen, Olympic cyclist (b. 1939)
- 6 April - Reinhilde Decleir, actress (b. 1948)
- 6 April - Annie Servais-Thysen, politician (b. 1933)
- 8 April - Henri Depireux, footballer (b. 1944)
- 10 April - Philippe Boesmans, composer (b. 1936)
- 17 April - Gilles Remiche, film director (b. 1979)
- 17 April - Catherine Spaak, actress (b. 1945)
- 23 April - Arno, singer (b. 1949)
- 1 May - Régine Zylberberg, singer (b. 1929)
- 2 May - Jean-Marie Faux, Jesuit author (b. 1923)
- 3 May - Jan Béghin, politician (b. 1949)
- 15 May - Robert Cogoi, singer (b. 1939)
- 31 May - Andrée Geulen, teacher (b. 1921)
- 1 June - Andrée Geulen, philanthropist (b. 1921)
- 13 June - Henri Garcin, actor (b.1928)
- 18 June - Marie-Rose Gaillard, racing cyclist (b. 1944)
- 26 July - Daniel Cardon de Lichtbuer, banker (b. 1930)
- 28 July - Philippe Sonnet, politician (b. 1964)
- 2 August - Lucien Kroll, architect (b. 1927)
- 3 August - Franz Marijnen, theatre director (b. 1943)
- 5 August - Caroline Pauwels, rector (b. 1964)
- 5 August - Jean-Jacques Cassiman, geneticist (b. 1943)
- 6 August - Arnold Willems, actor (b. 1932)
- 12 August - Georges Joris, politician (b. 1921)
- 17 August - Jan De Crem, politician (b. 1928)
- 25 August - Herman Van Springel, cyclist (b.1943)
- 11 September - Jean Bock, politician (b. 1931)
- 11 September - Michael DeGroote, businessman (b. 1933)
- 14 September - Michel Verschueren, businessman (b. 1931)
- 8 November — Will Ferdy, singer (b. 1927)
- 20 November – Andreas De Leenheer, biologist (b. 1941)
- 19 December – Luc De Schepper, physicist (b. 1957)
