= 2020 in Belgium =

- Decades: 2000s; 2010s; 2020s
- See also: Other events of 2020; List of years in Belgium

Events of the year 2020 in Belgium.

== Incumbents ==
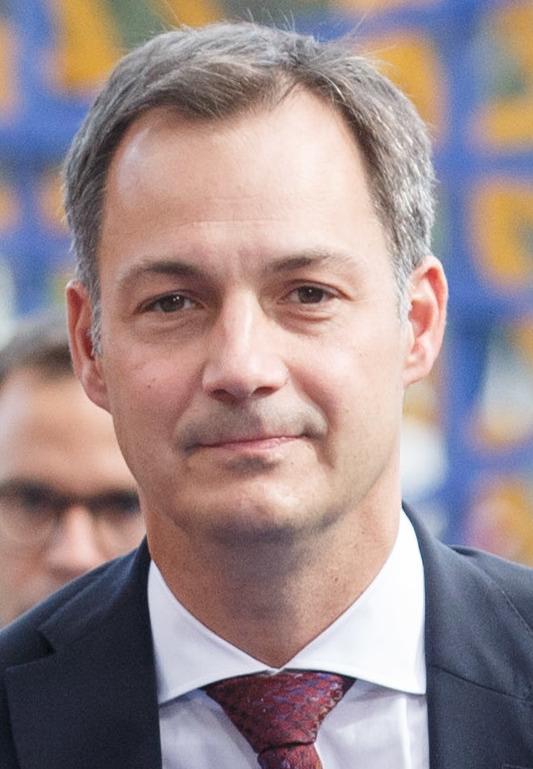
Alexander De Croo, Prime Minister of Belgium from 1 October 2020

- Monarch: Philippe
- Prime Minister: Sophie Wilmès (to 1 October); Alexander De Croo (from 1 October)

== Events ==
- 1 January – Two Belgian soldiers serving with UN forces in Mali injured by an improvised explosive device.
- 19 January – First international sleeper train service to leave Belgium since 2003 launched.
- 4 February – First confirmed case in the 2020 coronavirus outbreak in Belgium, carried by a Belgian repatriated from China three days previously.
- 23 February – Under international media scrutiny, the Carnival of Aalst features groups costumed as caricatures of Jews, with participants insisting that their intent was satirical rather than antisemitic.
- 4 March – Archaeological discovery of a Roman ironworks in Ninove publicised: the only such find so far in Belgium.
- 17 March – Prime Minister broadcasts stricter social distancing measures in response to the 2020 coronavirus outbreak in Belgium, with non-essential travel prohibited, non-essential shops to close, gatherings banned, and penalties to force companies and individuals to abide by the rules coming into effect at noon the following day.
- 7 June – About 10,000 people demonstrate in Brussels in support of the Black Lives Matter movement and against all forms of police brutality and racial discrimination.
- 30 July – Public prosecutors in Limburg conclude the judicial investigation into Belgium's first recorded death by hazing, recommending charges of negligent homicide, degrading treatment, and premeditated administration of dangerous substances against 18 former members of dissolved student fraternity Reuzegom.
- 30 August – Tim Merlier wins 2020 Brussels Cycling Classic.
- 1 September – Former NATO headquarters in Evere (1968–2018) formally returned to the Belgian state.
- 1 October – Swearing in of the new Belgian government, a seven-party coalition formed after almost 500 days of negotiations in the wake of the 2019 Belgian federal election.
- 3 October – Ghent University Museum opens.
- 13 October – Eliane Tillieux sworn in as the first woman to preside over the Chamber of Representatives.
- 30 October – Government announces second lockdown in response to rapidly rising COVID-19 infection rates, to begin on 2 November.

== Art and architecture ==
- Iris Tower in Brussels completed.

== Deaths ==
January

- 3 January – Gérard de Sélys, journalist (b. 1944)
- 6 January – Michel Didisheim, aristocrat and royal secretary (b. 1930)
- 9 January – Marc Morgan, singer-songwriter (b. 1962)
- 19 January – Leon van de Velde ("Pirana"), cartoonist (b. 1947)
- 27 January – Bernard de Give, Trappist monk (b. 1913)

February

- 3 February – Jacques Delelienne, Olympic athlete (b. 1928)
- 9 February – Délizia, singer (b. 1952)
- 11 February – Jean-Pierre Gallet, journalist (b. 1943)

March

- 14 March – René Follet, illustrator, comics writer and artist (b. 1931)
- 17 March
  - Patrick Nothomb, diplomat (b. 1936)
  - Johny Voners, actor (b. 1945)
- 31 March – Valeer Peirsman, sculptor (b. 1932)

April

- 12 April – Jacques De Decker, writer (b. 1945)
- 25 April – Henri Kichka, Holocaust survivor (b. 1926)
- 30 April – Tom Hautekiet, graphic designer (b. 1970)

May

- 21 May – Hugo Ryckeboer, dialectologist (b. 1935)
- 22 May – Francine Holley, painter (b. 1919)

June

- 18 June – Georges Octors, conductor (b. 1923)
- 29 June – Paula Marckx, pilot (b. 1925)

July

- 24 July – Jan Verroken, politician (b. 1917)

August

- 4 August – Ilse Uyttersprot, politician (b. 1967)
- 11 August
  - Gaspard Hons, poet (b. 1937)
  - Michel Van Aerde, cyclist (b. 1933)
- 17 August – Claude Laverdure, writer (b. 1947)
- 18 August – Richard Biefnot, politician (b. 1949)
- 19 August – François van Hoobrouck d'Aspre, politician (b. 1934)
- 24 August – Robbe De Hert, film director (b. 1942)
- 26 August – André-Paul Duchâteau, writer (b. 1925)
- 27 August – Claude De Bruyn, road safety advocate (b. 1943)
- 28 August – Antoinette Spaak, politician (b. 1928)

September

- 4 September – Annie Cordy, performer (b. 1928)
- 9 September – Patrick Davin, conductor (b. 1962)
- 22 September – Frie Leysen, festival director (b. 1950)
- 23 September – Yvette Alloo, paralympian (b. 1930)
- 26 September – Jacques Beurlet, footballer (b. 1944)
- 28 September – Frédéric Devreese, composer (b. 1929)

October

- 15 October – Alfons Verplaetse, national banker (b. 1930)
- 17 October – Lucien De Brauwere, cyclist (b. 1951)
- 18 October – Gérard Sulon, footballer (b. 1938)
- 24 October – Maurice Bodson, politician (b. 1944)
- 26 October – Marcel Hendrickx, politician (b. 1935)
- 27 October – Serge Noël, poet (b. 1956)
- 28 October – Joseph Moureau, fighter pilot (b. 1921)
- 30 October – Paul-Baudouin Michel, musicologist (b. 1930)

November

- 5 November – Joseph Reynaerts, singer (b. 1955)
- 7 November – Janine de Greef, Resister (b. 1925)
- 8 November – Herman Daled, art collector (b. 1930)
- 13 November – Rik Boel, judge (b. 1931)
- 17 November
  - Paul Sobol, Holocaust survivor (b. 1926)
  - Willy Kuijpers, politician (b. 1937)
- 24 November – Yves Vander Cruysen, historian (b. 1963)

December

- 11 December: Malik, comics artist (Archie Cash, Cupidon) (b. 1948).
- 28 December: Arthur Berckmans, comics artist (Sammy) (b. 1929).

== Links ==
- Media related to 2020 in Belgium at Wikimedia Commons
