= Liège (Walloon Parliament constituency) =

- Walloon Parliament constituency
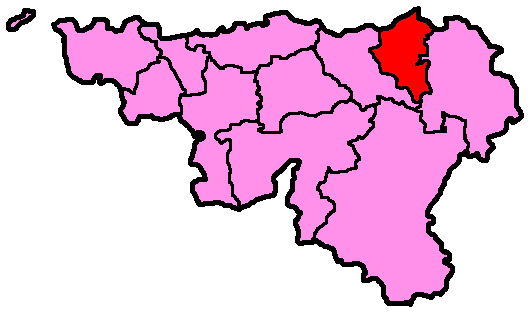
- Liège

Current constituency
- Created: 1995
- Seats: 14 (1995-2004); 13 (2004-present)

Liège is a parliamentary constituency in Belgium used to elect members of the Parliament of Wallonia since 1995. It corresponds to the Arrondissement of Liège.

== Representatives ==
Representatives of Liège (1995–present)
Election	MWP (Party)	MWP (Party)	MWP (Party)	MWP (Party)	MWP (Party)	MWP (Party)	MWP (Party)	MWP (Party)	MWP (Party)	MWP (Party)	MWP (Party)	MWP (Party)	MWP (Party)	MWP (Party)
1995	Gustave Hofman (PS)	Jean Namotte (PS)	Jean-Marie Léonard (PS)	Guy Mathot (PS)	Maggy Yerna (PS)	Marcel Neven (MR)	José Daras (Ecolo)	Annie Servais-Thysen (PRL)	Cyrille Tahay (PSC)	Ghislain Hiance (PSC)	Jean-Pierre Grafé (PSC)	Michel Deffet (PS)	Michel Foret (PRL)	Nicole Maréchal (Ecolo)
1999	Gustave Hofman (PS)	Jean Namotte (PS)	Jean-Marie Léonard (PS)	Frédéric Daerden (PS)	Patrick Avril (PS)	Marcel Neven (MR)	Bernard Wesphael (Ecolo)	Annie Servais-Thysen (PRL)	Alain Pieters (Ecolo)	André Namotte (PSC)	Christine Defraigne (MR)	Claude Ancion (MR)	Michel de Lamotte (CDH)	Philippe Henry (Ecolo)
2004	Alain Onkelinx (PS)	Charles Janssens (PS)	José Happart (PS)	Frédéric Daerden (PS)	Patrick Avril (PS)	Marcel Neven (MR)	Bernard Wesphael (Ecolo)	Charles Pire (FN)	Isabelle Simonis (PS)	Louis Smal (CDH)	Christine Defraigne (MR)	Claude Ancion (MR)	Michel de Lamotte (CDH)	13 seats
2009	Alain Onkelinx (PS)	Christie Morreale (PS)	Marc Bolland (PS)	Maurice Mottard (PS)	Mauro Lenzini (PS)	Marcel Neven (MR)	Bernard Wesphael (Ecolo)	Veronica Cremasco (Ecolo)	Isabelle Simonis (PS)	Marie-Dominique Simonet (CDH)	Christine Defraigne (MR)	Philippe Dodrimont (MR)	Michel de Lamotte (CDH)	13 seats
2014	André Vrancken (PS)	Christie Morreale (PS)	Zoé Istaz-Slangen (PS)	Maurice Mottard (PS)	Mauro Lenzini (PS)	Fabian Culot (MR)	Philippe Henry (Ecolo)	André-Pierre Puget (PP)	Diana Nikolic (MR)	Marie-Dominique Simonet (CDH)	Frédéric Gillot (PTB)	Philippe Dodrimont (MR)	Benoit Drèze (CDH)	13 seats
2019	Jean-Claude Marcourt (PS)	Christie Morreale (PS)	Sabine Roberty (PS)	Thierry Witsel (PS)	Mauro Lenzini (PS)	Veronica Cremasco (Ecolo)	Olivier Bierin (Ecolo)	Alice Bernard (PTB)	Diana Nikolic (MR)	Julien Liradelfo (PTB)	Laure Lekane (PTB)	Philippe Dodrimont (MR)	Alda Greoli (CDH)	13 seats
2024	Virginie Defrang-Firket (MR)	Christie Morreale (PS)	Sabine Roberty (PS)	Thierry Witsel (PS)	Olivier de Wasseige (Les Engagés)	Veronica Cremasco (Ecolo)	Sophie Fafchamps (Les Engagés)	Alice Bernard (PTB)	Diana Nikolic (MR)	Julien Liradelfo (PTB)	Rachida Aït Alouha (PTB)	Philippe Dodrimont (MR)	Arnaud Dewez (MR)	13 seats
