= 2014 in Belgium =

- Decades: 1990s; 2000s; 2010s; 2020s
- See also: Other events of 2014; List of years in Belgium

The following lists events that happened during 2014 in Belgium.

== Incumbents ==
- Monarch: Philippe
- Prime Minister: Elio Di Rupo (until 11 October), Charles Michel (starting 11 October)

== Events ==
January

February

- 13 February – Belgium becomes the first country to legalise euthanasia without any age limits.

March

April

- 4 April – 20 people injured as protesters from across Europe clash with police in Brussels at a demonstration against high unemployment.

May

- 24 May – Jewish Museum of Belgium shooting kills three and seriously injures one in Brussels.
- 25 May – Elections are held for the regional parliaments, the federal parliament and the European Parliament.

June

July

- 17 July – Six Belgians (two with dual nationality) among the 298 people on board killed when Malaysia Airlines Flight MH17 brought down in Eastern Ukraine near the Russian border.

August

- 4 August – Representatives of 83 countries mark the centenary of the beginning of the First World War with remembrance ceremonies at the Allied Memorial in Liège and at St Symphorien cemetery.

September

October

- 11 October – Michel Government sworn in 138 days after 25 May elections

November

- 6 November – 100,000-person anti-austerity demonstration in Brussels ends in violence, with 50 people injured and 30 detained

December

- 3 December – Foreign ministers from members of NATO attend a summit in Belgium to discuss the 2014 pro-Russian unrest in Ukraine and the Islamic State of Iraq and the Levant insurgency.
- 15 December – 24-hour general strike to protest the austerity measures of the Michel Government.

== Sports ==
- 6 April – Ellen van Dijk wins the Tour of Flanders, a women's road cycling World Cup race.
- 24 August – Daniel Ricciardo wins the 70th Belgian Grand Prix at the Circuit de Spa-Francorchamps in Spa, Belgium

== Deaths ==
- 2 January – Jeanne Brabants, 93, dancer and choreographer (b. 1920)
- 14 January – Alfons Thijs, 69, historian (b. 1944)
- 19 January – Damien Yzerbyt, 50, politician (b. 1963)
- 18 February – Kristof Goddaert, 27, road racing cyclist (b. 1986)
- 19 February – Norbert Beuls, 57, footballer and football manager (b. 1957)
- 27 February – Jan Hoet, 77, museum curator (b. 1936)
- 1 March – Paul Tant, 68, politician (b. 1945)
- 8 March – Gerard Mortier, 70, opera director and administrator (b. 1943)
- 12 March – Jean Vallée, 72, songwriter and performer (b. 1941)
- 25 March – Lode Wouters, 84, cyclist (b. 1929)
- 31 March – Roger Somville, 90, modern painter (b. 1923)
- 9 April – Jos Chabert, 81, politician (b. 1933)
- 15 May – Jean-Luc Dehaene, 73, 63rd Prime Minister of Belgium (b. 1940)
- 24 May – Jean-Claude Pirotte, 74, writer, poet and painter (b. 1939)
- 26 July – Roland Verhavert, 87, film director (b. 1927)
- 11 August – Simon Leys, 78, diplomat and author (b. 1935)
- 18 August – Jean Nicolay, 76, footballer (b. 1937)
- 30 August – Igor Decraene, 18, cyclist (b. 1996)
- 18 September – Olivier Vanneste, 84, politician and economist (b. 1930)
- 20 September – Pino Cerami, 92, road bicycle racer (b. 1922)
- 22 September – Flor Van Noppen, 58, politician (b. 1956)
- 3 October – Ward Ruyslinck, 85, writer (b. 1929)
- 23 October – André Piters, 83, footballer (b. 1931)
- 9 November – Willy Monty, 75, racing cyclist (b. 1939)
- 29 November – Luc De Vos, 52, Singer of rockband Gorki (b. 1962)
- 5 December – Fabiola, 86, Queen-consort of Belgium from 1960 to 1993 (b. 1928)
- 26 December – Leo Tindemans, 92, 43rd Prime Minister of Belgium (b. 1922)
- 27 December – Jacques Vandenhaute, 83, politician (b. 1931)
- 27 December – Karel Poma, 94, liberal politician (b. 1920)

== See also ==
- 2014 in Belgian television
