= 2023 in Belgium =

- Decades: 2000s; 2010s; 2020s
- See also: Other events of 2023; List of years in Belgium

Events in the year 2023 in Belgium.

== Incumbents ==
- Monarch: Philippe
- Prime Minister: Alexander De Croo

== Events ==
- 10 March – Belgium banned TikTok from all federal government work devices over cybersecurity, privacy, and misinformation concerns.
- 5 May – Belgian authorities arrest an Iraqi Al-Qaeda member and charge him with murder, terrorism, war crimes, and crimes against humanity, for his role in the deaths of at least 376 people and the wounding of over 2,300 others more than a decade ago in Iraq.
- 9 May — Flemish Canon published.
- 13 May – Belgium in the Eurovision Song Contest 2023
- 20 June – Ann Vermorgen elected president of the Confederation of Christian Trade Unions
- 3 September — Luc Terlinden consecrated as Archbishop of Mechelen-Brussels.
- 4 September — Belgian state makes unprecedented retail bond issue for €22 billion.
- 9 September – Belgian Beer World opens in Brussels
- 16 October — 2023 Brussels shooting: two Swedish nationals are killed during a shooting near Brussels-Central railway station. The perpetrator fled the scene, but was shot by police the following day.
- 15 December — A joint text message traffic investigation by the Financial Times, Der Spiegel and Le Monde reveals that Belgian Vlaams Belang politician Frank Creyelman accepted bribes from the Chinese Ministry of State Security for three years to influence discussions within the European Union. He was subsequently expelled from the party.
- 18 December — Largest criminal trial in Belgian history begins in Brussels, with 125 defendants accused of drug trafficking, arms trafficking, kidnapping, extortion, forgery, and money laundering.

== Sports ==
- 4 February – 19 March: 2023 Rugby Europe Championship
- 11 – 15 July 2023: 2023 European Amateur Team Championship

== Deaths ==
- 3 January – Jean-Marie André, 78, scientist
- 5 January – Pierre Joassin, 74, film director and screenwriter (Maigret, Josephine, Guardian Angel)
- 17 March – Raoul Servais, 94, filmmaker
- 29 March – Myriam Ullens, 70, businesswoman
- 25 August – Tijl De Decker, 22, cyclist
- 31 October – Jaak Broekx, 109, centenarian and oldest man in Belgium
