= 2021 in Belgium =

- Decades: 2000s; 2010s; 2020s
- See also: Other events of 2021; List of years in Belgium

Events in the year 2021 in Belgium.

== Incumbents ==
- Monarch: Philippe.
- Prime Minister: Alexander De Croo.

== Events ==
Ongoing – COVID-19 pandemic in Belgium

- 4 to 5 May – DDOS attack on Belnet disrupts accessibility of websites using the .be domain, including those of the government, parliament, police, educational and research institutions, healthcare, and public broadcasters, forcing the postponement of parliamentary hearings relating to the persecution of Uyghurs in China.
- 17 May to 20 June – Manhunt for Jürgen Conings, a soldier and suspected far-right extremist, goes on the run with several rocket launchers and a machine gun, leaving letters with threats against politicians, virologists and the army command. He shoots himself dead. Hundreds of police officers and soldiers combed Hoge Kempen National Park without success.
- 12 June – Belgium national football team beats Russia 3–0 in their first match of UEFA Euro 2020 at Saint Petersburg Stadium. Romelu Lukaku scores two goals and Thomas Meunier one.
- 18 June – A school under construction collapses in Antwerp, killing 5 workers.
- 14 July – Record rainfall causes beginning of 2021 European floods in Belgium, Luxembourg, the Netherlands and then Germany.
- 19 to 22 September – The 2021 UCI Road World Championships is held in the Flanders region.

== Deaths ==
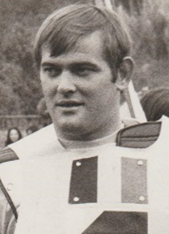
Joël Robert

- 7 January – Jan Blommaert, sociolinguist and linguistic anthropologist (born 1961).
- 13 January – Joël Robert, motocross racer, six-time world champion (born 1943).
- 18 January – Jeanine De Landtsheer, classicist (born 1954)
- 22 January – Élisabeth Burdot, journalist (born 1940)
- 30 January - Michel Trempont, operatic baritone (born 1928)
- 3 February – Patrick Lebon, film director and screenwriter (born 1940)
- 10 February – Luc Versteylen, Jesuit (born 1927)
- 11 February – Jacques Crickillon, novelist, poet and essayist (born 1940)
- 19 February – Leopold Lippens, politician (born 1941)
- 21 February – Marc Waelkens, professor emeritus of archaeology (born 1948)
- 12 March – Jos Van Gorp, actor (born 1939)
- 21 April – Henri Mouton, politician (born 1933)
- 20 May – Johan Weyts, politician (born 1939)
- 26 May – Lambert Kelchtermans, politician (born 1929)
- 1 June – Paula Sémer, broadcaster (born 1925)
- 7 June – Dixie Dansercoer, explorer and photographer (born 1962)
