= Bulcke =

Bulcke and Van den Bulcke are surnames. Notable people with the surnames include:

== Bulcke ==
- Brian Bulcke (born 1987), Canadian football player
- Camille Bulcke (1909–1982), Belgian Jesuit missionary in India
- Germain Bulcke (1902–1994), Belgian-American union organizer
- Paul Bulcke (born 1954), Belgian businessman

== Van den Bulcke ==
- Cathelyne Van den Bulcke (died 1590), Flemish woman executed for witchcraft
- Henri Van den Bulcke (1889–1947), Belgian ice hockey player and administrator
