= Henri Mouton =

Henri Mouton may refer to:

- Henri Mouton (scientist) (1869–1935), French scientist
- Henri Mouton (footballer) (1881–1962), French footballer
- Henri Mouton (politician) (1933–2021), Belgian politician
