= 2017 in Belgium =

- Decades: 1990s; 2000s; 2010s; 2020s
- See also: Other events of 2017; List of years in Belgium

Events in the year 2017 in Belgium.

== Incumbents ==
- Monarch: Philippe
- Prime Minister: Charles Michel

== Events ==
January

- 17 January – Public outcry about Romanie Schotte, crowned Miss Belgium 3 days before, posting a Pile of Poo emoji in response to a racist comment about somebody in the background of one of her Instagram photos, many taking it to indicate agreement with the comment.

February

- 14 February – Mayor of Mechelen, Bart Somers, wins world mayor of the year award, for his efforts to promote integration and prevent crime.

May

- 24 May – Thousands demonstrate in Brussels to protest Donald Trump's presence for a NATO summit.
- 25 May – Donald Trump addresses NATO summit in Brussels.

June

- 20 June – June 2017 Brussels attack: after an explosion without casualties in Brussels Central Station, a suspect is shot dead by patrolling soldiers.

August

- 25 August – August 2017 Brussels attack: two soldiers injured in a knife attack; Islamic State claims responsibility.

October

- 30 October – Carles Puigdemont and others facing rebellion charges for their role in the Catalan declaration of independence take refuge in Belgium.

November

- 11 November – Rioting and looting in Brussels after celebrations of the Morocco national football team qualifying for the 2018 FIFA World Cup turn violent; 23 injured, including 22 police officers.

== Sports ==
July

- 2 July – Stage 2 of the 104th Tour de France ends in Liège, with Marcel Kittel as winner.
- 3 July – Stage 3 of the 104th Tour de France starts in Verviers.

== Deaths ==
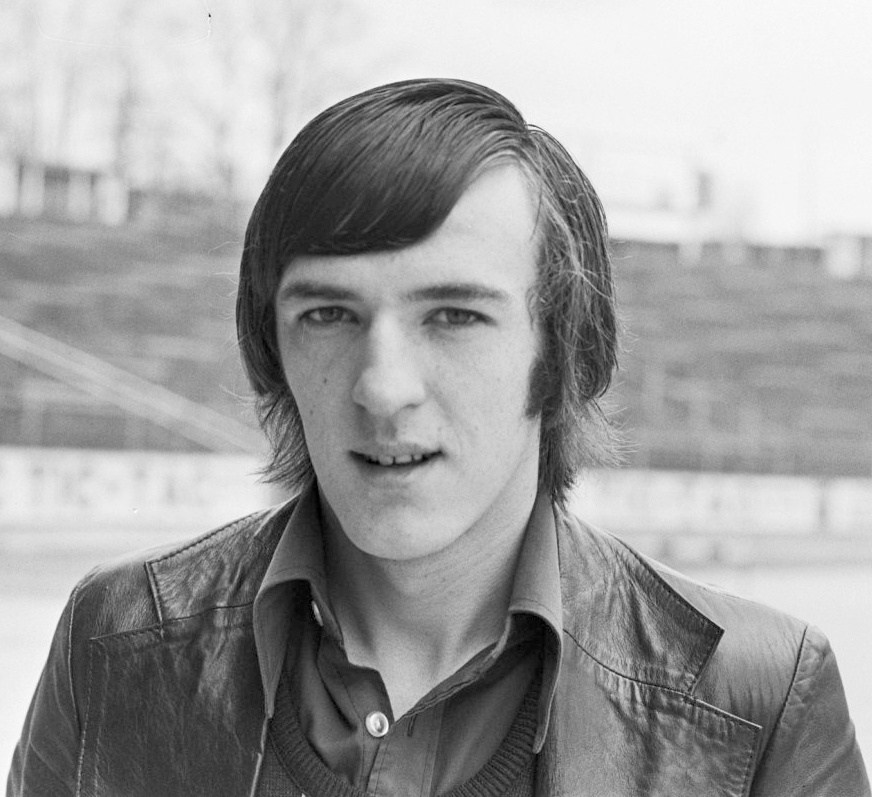
François Van der Elst

- 5 January – Luc Coene, economist (b. 1947).
- 11 January – François Van der Elst, footballer (b. 1954).
- 21 January – Marc Baecke, footballer (b. 1956).
- 1 February
  - Étienne Tshisekedi, Congolese politician (b. 1932).
  - Antoon Verschoot, bugler (b. 1925).
- 8 February – Jan Vansina, historian and anthropologist (b. 1929).
- 9 February – Serge Baguet, cyclist (b. 1969).
- 20 February – André Vlayen, cyclist (b. 1931).
- 27 February – Marcel De Corte, footballer (b. 1929).
- 2 March – Édouard Close, politician (b. 1929).
- 6 March – Eddy Pauwels, cyclist (b. 1935).
- 12 March – Patrick Nève, racing driver (b. 1949).
- 17 April – Nicolle Van Den Broeck, cyclist (b. 1946).
- 30 April – Jean De Mesmaeker (Jidéhem), cartoonist (b. 1935).
- 15 May – Ulrich Libbrecht, philosopher (b. 1928).
- 20 May – Emile Degelin, filmmaker (b. 1926).
- 24 May – Pierre Seron, cartoonist (b. 1942).
- 1 June – Leon Lemmens, bishop (b. 1954).
- 6 June – François Houtart, radical priest (b. 1925).
- 1 September – Annette Wademant, screenwriter (b. 1928)
- 7 December – Philippe Maystadt, politician (b. 1948).
