= De Moortel =

De Moortel or Van De Moortel is a surname. It is the surname of:

- Arie Van de Moortel (1918–1976), Belgian musician and composer
- Françoise Van De Moortel (1941–2005), Belgian journalist
- Ineke De Moortel, Belgian applied mathematician
- Joris van de Moortel, Belgian artist in BiennaleOnline
- Mathilde Van de Moortel, winner of the 2016 César Award for Best Editing
