= 2019 in Belgium =

- Decades: 1990s; 2000s; 2010s; 2020s
- See also: Other events of 2019; List of years in Belgium

Events of the year 2019 in Belgium.

== Incumbents ==
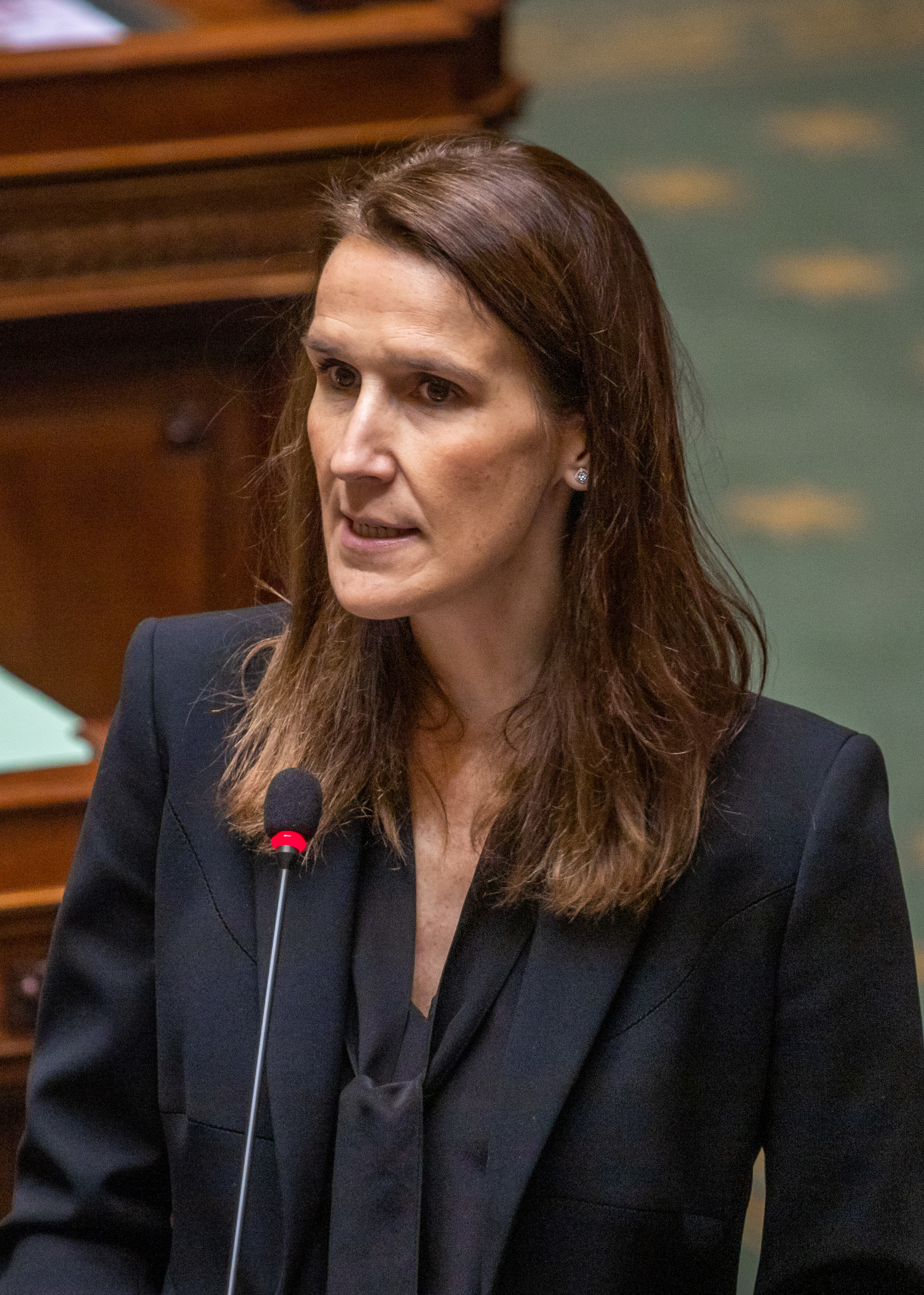
Sophie Wilmès, Belgium's first female head of government

- Monarch: Philippe
- Prime Minister: Charles Michel (to 27 October); Sophie Wilmès (from 27 October)

== Events ==
- 1 January – Fifteen Flemish municipalities merge into seven, the first such merges for several decades
- January – A ban on Kosher and halal slaughter comes into effect in the Flanders region of Belgium. The northern region of Belgium is the first to implement the ban. Similar restrictions will be in place in the southern Wallonia region from September.
- 26 April – Beatrijs Deconinck takes office as first female president of the Court of Cassation
- 26 May – European elections, regional elections and federal election
- 29 May – King Philippe held an official meeting with the leader of the nationalist Vlaams Belang party, Tom Van Grieken. According to Belgian media, 1936 was the last time a far-right leader had had an official meeting with the king.
- 25 July – The hottest day on record in Belgium, with a temperature of 39.7 °C measured at the Royal Meteorological Institute in Uccle and of 41.8 °C in Begijnendijk.
- 27 October – Sophie Wilmès appointed head of caretaker government: Belgium's first female prime minister.
- 27 November – Lode Van Hecke, Abbot of Orval, named bishop of Ghent in succession to Lucas Van Looy.

== Culture ==
- 20 May – Dardenne brothers film Young Ahmed screened at 2019 Cannes Film Festival, winning them Best Director award.
- 21 May – Plans to build microbrewery inside Grimbergen Abbey publicised.

== Deaths ==
January

- 1 January – Wilfried Verleyen, 87, monastic historian
- 4 January – Wiet Van Broeckhoven, 69, radio presenter and writer.
- 18 January – Etienne Vermeersch, 84, moral philosopher.

February

- 13 February – Willy Willy, rock musician with The Scabs, dies at age 59.
- 17 February – Claude Renard, 72, comics artist (Ivan Casablanca, 1914-1918, Les Anges de Mons) and teacher (founder of Atelier R).
- 18 February – Bob Van Der Veken, TV actor (De Collega's), dies at age 95.

March

- 14 March – Godfried Danneels, 85, cardinal Metropolitan Archbishop of Mechelen-Brussels and the chairman of the episcopal conference.

April

- 19 April – Patrick Sercu, 74, cyclist.

May

- 26 May – Alexis Dragonetti, 50, publisher.

July

- 17 July – Robert Waseige, 79, association football trainer.

August

- 4 August – André Goosse, 93, linguist.
- 5 August – Bjorg Lambrecht, 22, cyclist.
- 9 August – José Desmarets, 93, politician.

September

- 5 September – Charles Jarry, 66, comics artist (Élodie d'Avray, Costa).

October

- 5 October
  - Rik Pareit, 66, journalist and writer.
  - Philippe Vandevelde, a.k.a. Philippe Tome, 62, comics writer (Le Petit Spirou, Soda, continued Spirou et Fantasio) and artist (assistant of Dupa, Turk and Bob de Groot).
- 22 October – Marieke Vervoort, 40, athlete.
- 23 October – Michel Nihoul, Belgian criminal (Dutroux affair), dies at age 78.

November

- 22 November – Gaston Durnez, 91, journalist, poet, writer and comics writer (De Geschiedenis van Sleenovia, came up with the name of the comics character Detective Van Zwam by Marc Sleen).

December

- 7 December – Dani Dacquin, 84, comics artist (Adam en Eva, De Lotgevallen van Lotje, Yoeko).
- 14 December – Panamarenko, 79, sculptor.
- 22 December – Freek Neirynck, 70, theatre director, journalist, actor, writer and comics writer.
- 30 December – André Smets, 76, politician.

== See also ==
- 2019 European Parliament election

== Links ==
- Media related to 2019 in Belgium at Wikimedia Commons
