= 2016 in Belgian television =

This is a list of Belgian television related events from 2016.

== Events ==
- 8 January - 14-year-old Jens Dolleslagers wins the second season of The Voice Kids.
- 17 January - Laura Tesoro is selected to represent Belgium at the 2016 Eurovision Song Contest with her song "What's the Pressure". She is selected to be the fifty-eighth Belgian Eurovision entry during Eurosong held at the AED Studios in Lint.
- 2 June - Lola Obasuyi wins the fourth season of The Voice van Vlaanderen.

== Television shows ==
=== 1990s ===
- Samson en Gert (1990–present)
- Familie (1991–present)
- Thuis (1995–present)

=== 2000s ===
- Mega Mindy (2006–present)

=== 2010s ===
- ROX (2011–present)
- The Voice van Vlaanderen (2011–present)
- Belgium's Got Talent (2012–present)

== Networks and services ==
=== Conversions and rebrandings ===
Old network name	New network name	Type	Conversion Date	Notes	Source
2BE	Q2	Cable and satellite	Unknown		

== Deaths ==
Date	Name	Age	Cinematic Credibility
12 October	Georges Désir	91	Belgian TV producer & host

== See also ==
- 2016 in Belgium
