= Canon of Flanders =

The Canon of Flanders (Dutch: Canon van Vlaanderen) is a list of key developments in the history of the Flemish Region of Belgium, as exemplified by particularly striking people, places, events or artefacts, drawn up by a committee of nine experts appointed by the regional government of Flanders. Although this was widely perceived to be a politically motivated attempt to boost a sense of distinctively 'Flemish' identity, the committee responsible for drawing up the 'canon' insisted that their work was free of political considerations.

There have been suggestions that the Flemish canon, which follows similar initiatives such as the Danish Culture Canon and the Canon of the Netherlands, will be a useful guideline for teaching history in schools and preparing new immigrants for citizenship.

Published on 9 May 2023, the 60 events considered essential to an understanding of Flemish history are:

- The end of the Last Glacial Period
- Neanderthal settlement in the Valley of the Meuse
- Linear Pottery culture: the first agriculturalists in the region
- Hallstatt culture as exemplified by archaeological finds at Kemmelberg
- Incorporation into the Roman Empire, exemplified by the city of Tongeren
- The Frankish Empire of Charlemagne
- The oldest written traces of the Dutch language, exemplified by the verse Hebban olla vogala
- Agricultural innovation in the High Middle Ages, exemplified by the windmill at Wormhout
- Bruges as a medieval commercial metropolis
- The depiction of the region on the maps of Muhammad al-Idrisi
- Beguinages
- Medieval vernacular literature, exemplified by the stories of Reynard the Fox
- Social revolutions in the cities of Flanders and Brabant, exemplified by the Battle of the Golden Spurs (1302)
- Medieval iconography, exemplified by the Ghent Altarpiece
- The rise of the Burgundian State, exemplified in the Battle of Gavere (1453)
- Processions and Ommegangen, exemplified by the Ros Beiaard Dendermonde
- Polyphonic music, exemplified by the 16th-century Mechelen Choirbook
- Renaissance humanism, exemplified by Erasmus
- Europeans in the New World, exemplified by Pedro de Gante
- Renaissance art, exemplified by Peter Bruegel the Elder's Dull Gret
- The Iconoclastic Fury of 1566
- Early-modern science, exemplified by Simon Stevin
- The witch craze, exemplified by Cathelyne Van den Bulcke (executed 1590)
- Baroque art, exemplified by Rubens's Adoration of the Magi (1624)
- The 1695 Bombardment of Brussels
- The European Enlightenment, exemplified by Empress Maria Theresa (1717–1780)
- The industrial revolution
- The Napoleonic Code of 1804
- The Belgian Revolution of 1830
- The first Belgian railways (1835)
- The growth of a Flemish consciousness, exemplified by Hendrik Conscience's novel De Leeuw van Vlaenderen (1838)
- The potato blight of 1845–1847
- The opening of the Scheldt to navigation (1863), allowing the development of the Port of Antwerp
- The 19th-century social question, exemplified by Emilie Claeys
- Artistic innovation, exemplified by James Ensor's Christ's Entry into Brussels (1889)
- The struggle for universal suffrage, exemplified by the deaths of six protesters in Leuven on 18 April 1902
- Women's education, exemplified by Marie-Elisabeth Belpaire
- The Flemish Movement
- The Tour of Flanders
- Colonization of the Congo Basin, exemplified by Paul Panda Farnana
- World War I
- The Limburg coal mines
- The Young Christian Workers founded by Joseph Cardijn
- 20th-century cookbooks
- The Yser Towers
- World War II
- The deportation of Jews from Belgium during the Holocaust, exemplified by the Dossin Barracks
- The development of the Welfare State
- Post-War town and country planning
- Television as a mass medium
- Artistic innovation, exemplified by the poetry of Hugo Claus
- The sexual revolution
- French-language culture in Flanders, exemplified by Jacques Brel
- The drawing of a linguistic border within Belgium
- Economic growth in the 1960s
- Pop festivals
- European integration
- LGBT rights
- The standardisation of Belgian Dutch
- 21st-century multiculturalism
