= 2015 in Belgian television =

This is a list of Belgian television related events from 2015.

== Events ==
- 15 May - 22-year-old pole dancer Domenico Vaccaro wins the third season of Belgium's Got Talent.

== Television shows ==
=== 1990s ===
- Samson en Gert (1990–present)
- Familie (1991–present)
- Thuis (1995–present)

=== 2000s ===
- Mega Mindy (2006–present)

=== 2010s ===
- ROX (2011–present)
- The Voice van Vlaanderen (2011–present)
- Belgium's Got Talent (2012–present)

== Networks and services ==
=== Launches ===
Network	Type	Launch date	Notes	Source
BBC First	Cable television	4 June		
Kadet	Cable television	18 December		

=== Closures ===
Network	Type	End date	Notes	Sources
JIM	Cable and satellite	16 December		

== See also ==
- 2015 in Belgium
