= 2015 in Belgium =

- Decades: 1990s; 2000s; 2010s; 2020s
- See also: Other events of 2015; List of years in Belgium

The following lists events that happened in 2015 in the Kingdom of Belgium.

== Incumbents ==
- Monarch: Philippe
- Prime Minister: Charles Michel

== Events ==
=== January ===
- 3 January - Belgian media reports that serial rapist and murderer Frank Van Den Bleeken will be euthanised in prison in Bruges on 11 January.
- 15 January - Belgian police kill two suspected terrorists in an anti-terrorism raid near Verviers.

=== June ===
- 28 June - A coach driver from Northern Ireland is killed and several teachers and schoolchildren from Brentwood in Essex are injured after a coach crashes near Ostend.

=== November ===
- 6 November - Resignation of André-Joseph Léonard as archbishop of Mechelen-Brussels comes into effect; Jozef De Kesel, bishop of Bruges, named as his successor.
- 21-25 November - Brussels lockdown in the wake of the November 2015 Paris attacks.

=== December ===
- 12 December - Jozef De Kesel installed as archbishop of Mechelen-Brussels

== Deaths ==
- 5 January – Alfons Peeters, 71, footballer (b. 1943)
- 10 January – Junior Malanda, 20, professional footballer (b. 1994)
- 22 January – Louis Devos, 88, opera singer and educator (b. 1926)
- 26 January – Louisa Colpeyn, 96, actress (b. 1918)
- 1 February – Marie-José Villiers, 98, countess (b. 1916)
- 18 February – Claude Criquielion, 58, professional road bicycle racer (b. 1957)
- 25 March – Joris Van Hauthem, 51, politician (b. 1963)
- 2 April – Steve Stevaert, 60, politician (b. 1954)
- 13 April – Noël De Pauw, 72, professional racing cyclist (b. 1942)
- 22 April – Régis Ghesquière, 65, decathlete (b. 1949)
- 13 November – Éliane Vogel-Polsky, 89, lawyer and feminist (b. 1926)

== See also ==
- 2015 in Belgian television
