= Jean-Pierre Gallet =

Belgian journalist (1943–2020)

- Born: 7 April 1943
- Died: 11 February 2020 (aged 76)
- Occupation: Journalist

Jean-Pierre Gallet (French pronunciation: [ʒɑ̃ pjɛʁ ɡalɛ]; 7 April 1943 – 11 February 2020) was a Belgian journalist who worked for RTBF.

== Biography ==
Gallet began working in media in 1976 with La Première. He then hosted the television program bulletin d'information from 1982 to 1988 with Georges Moucheron, Jean-Jacques Jespers, and Françoise Van De Moortel. He became news director in 1995, then left the organization in 2004.

Gallet died on 11 February 2020.
