= 2016 in Belgium =

- Decades: 1990s; 2000s; 2010s; 2020s
- See also: Other events of 2016; List of years in Belgium

Events in the year 2016 in Belgium.

== Incumbents ==
- Monarch: Philippe
- Prime Minister: Charles Michel

== Events ==
January

- 30 January – Belgian cyclist Femke Van den Driessche is caught concealing a motor and battery in her bicycle during the under-23 women's race at the UCI Cyclo-cross World Championships in Zolder. She was found guilty of "technological fraud", the world's first case of mechanical doping in cycling.

February

- 6 February – 6th Magritte Awards to recognise achievement in the film industry held in Brussels

March

- 22 March – 2016 Brussels bombings cause 34 deaths
- 25 March – 2016 E3 Harelbeke (one-day cycling classic)
- 27 March – 2016 Gent–Wevelgem (one-day cycling classic)

April

- 3 April – 2016 Tour of Flanders (one-day cycling classic)

June

- 5 June – Hermalle-sous-Huy train collision

August

- 6 August – 2016 stabbing of Charleroi police officers: a man attacks two policewomen with a machete
- 28 August – Nico Rosberg wins the Belgian Grand Prix at the Circuit de Spa-Francorchamps in Spa, Belgium.

October

- 5 October – 2016 stabbing of Brussels police officers: man stabs three police officers

November

- 19 November – Jozef De Kesel, Archbishop of Mechelen-Brussels, appointed cardinal.
- 30 November – UNESCO lists beer culture in Belgium as part of the intangible cultural heritage of humanity.

December

- 4 December – Lode Aerts consecrated as bishop of Bruges

== Deaths ==
- 6 February – Eddy Wally (born 1932), singer.
- 27 March – Antoine Demoitié (born 1990), cyclist.
- 21 May – Gaston Berghmans (born 1926), actor and comedian.
- 25 July - Paskal Deboosere (born 1962), radio and television host.
- 18 August – Jan van Cauwelaert (born 1914), bishop.
- 22 August - Toots Thielemans (born 1922), jazz musician.
- 20 October - Roger Lallemand (born 1932), politician.
- 4 November - Hubert van Herreweghen (born 1920), poet.
- 6 November - Marc Sleen (born 1922), comics artist.
- 2 December - Paul de Wispelaere (born 1928), poet and novelist.
- 13 December - Patrick Derochette (born 1964), criminal.

== See also ==
- 2016 in Belgian television
