= Pierre Joassin =

Belgian film director and screenwriter (1948–2023)

- Born: 26 August 1948; Amay, Belgium
- Died: 4 January 2023 (aged 74)
- Occupation(s): Film director Screenwriter

Pierre Joassin (26 August 1948 – 4 January 2023) was a Belgian film director and screenwriter. He had started his career as an assistant to Jean-Marie Degèsves.

== Filmography ==
=== Cinema ===
- Du bout des lèvres (1976)
- Gros Cœurs (1987)

=== Television ===
- Les Cordier, juge et flic (1995)
- Maigret (1995–2004)
- Chère Marianne (1999)
- Josephine, Guardian Angel (1999)
- Sauveur Giordano (2001–2008)
- Crimes en série (2003)
- À tort ou à raison (2009)

=== Telefilms ===
- Minitrip (1981)
- Folle de moi (1996)
- Une fille à papas (1996)
- Vous êtes libre ? (2004)
- Une ombre derrière la porte (2008)
- Un bébé pour mes 40 ans (2010)
- Merci Patron (2011)
