= Jacques Vandenhaute =

Belgian politician (1931–2014)

- Born: 3 September 1931; Etterbeek, Belgium
- Died: 27 December 2014 (aged 83); Woluwe-Saint-Pierre, Belgium
- Occupation: Politician
- Political party: Mouvement Réformateur

Jacques Vandenhaute (3 September 1931 – 27 December 2014) was a Belgian politician from the Mouvement Réformateur who served as Senator from 1981 to 1995 and as MP from 1995 to 1999.
