= Amand Dalem =

Belgian politician (1938–2018)

Amand Dalem (5 June 1938 – 28 February 2018) was a Belgian politician who was Mayor of Rochefort (1970–1994), Senator (1979–1994), Minister of the Walloon Government (1985–1992), and Governor of the Province of Namur (1994–2007).
