= Michel Konen =

Belgian journalist (1950–2022)

- Born: 24 December 1950; Malmedy, Belgium
- Died: 17 January 2022 (aged 71); Liège, Belgium
- Occupation: Journalist

Michel Konen (24 December 1950 – 17 January 2022) was a Belgian journalist and television presenter. He served as editor-in-chief of RTBF and La Libre Belgique and was subsequently communications director of the political party Humanist Democratic Centre. He died on 17 January 2022, at the age of 70.
