= Miss Belgium 2018 =

Beauty pageant edition

- Date: January 13, 2018
- Venue: Plopsaland Theater, De Panne, Belgium
- Broadcaster: AB3; FOX België
- Entrants: 30
- Placements: 20
- Winner: Angeline Flor Pua; Antwerp

Miss Belgium 2018 the 50th Miss Belgium pageant, held on January 13, 2018 at the Plopsaland Theater in De Panne, Belgium. Angeline Flor Pua was crowned as Miss Belgium 2018 in the conclusion of the pageant. After her crowning, Angeline Flor Pua underwent racist abuse on social media for not being Belgian enough to represent the country at any international pageant.> This is the only edition where the Top 3 represent Belgium at Miss Universe Pageant.

== Winner and runners-up ==
Final Results	Contestant
Miss Belgium 2018	Antwerp – Angeline Flor Pua
1st Runner-Up	Namur – Zoé Brunet
2nd Runner-Up	Antwerp – Dhenia Covens
3rd Runner-Up	Limburg – Lotte Vanlingen
4th Runner-Up	West Flanders – Hélène Frederiks
5th Runner-Up	Limburg – Vanille Seurs
Top 12	Flemish Brabant – Didem Çelebi; Hainaut – Britany Thiry; Walloon Brabant – Barbara Bierlier; Walloon Brabant – Julia Griffi; West Flanders – Alycia Vandenabeele; West Flanders – Caroline Delforge
Top 20	Antwerp – Shakila Allahyar; Antwerp – Xenia Goysens; Brussels – Olivia Simmons; Flemish Brabant – Jasmien Mollekens; Flemish Brabant – Laura Smeyers; Liège – Giovanna Verolla; West Flanders – Alexia Coussement; West Flanders – Aloysi Desnouck

=== Special awards ===
Award	Contestant
Miss Sport; Miss Brussels	Laura Smeyers
Miss Talent	Aloysi Desnouck
Miss Beach; Miss Flanders	Dhenia Covens
Miss Social Media	Didem Celebi
Miss Sympathy	Daphné Fanon
Miss Model; Miss Wallonia	Zoé Brunet

== Official contestants ==
30 candidates competed for the title:

Province	Contestant	Age	Hometown
Antwerp	Angeline Flor Pua	22	Borgerhout
Antwerp	Dhenia Covens	24	Vremde
Antwerp	Judy Van de Vyver	20	Zwijndrecht
Antwerp	Justine Willemse	22	Arendonk
Antwerp	Shakila Allahyar	21	Antwerp
Antwerp	Xenia Goysens	18	Deurne
Brussels	Magali Hadji	19	Anderlecht
Brussels	Olivia Simmons	19	Brussels
East Flanders	Émilie Van Ooteghem	19	Zwijnaarde
East Flanders	Gaëlle Debruyne	19	Destelbergen
Flemish Brabant	Didem Çelebi	19	Wezembeek-Oppem
Flemish Brabant	Jasmien Mollekens	20	Affligem
Flemish Brabant	Laura Smeyers	20	Kapelle-op-den-Bos
Hainaut	Britany Thiry	22	Quaregnon
Hainaut	Cassi Bellavia	18	La Louvière
Hainaut	Kimberley Hallaert	18	Manage
Liège	Els Salve	20	Vottem
Liège	Giovanna Verolla	18	Herstal
Limburg	Lotte Vanlingen	18	Houthalen-Helchteren
Limburg	Vanille Seurs	18	Hasselt
Luxembourg	Daphné Fanon	20	Durbuy
Namur	Laurianne Delestinne	20	Bossière
Namur	Zoé Brunet	17	Jemeppe-sur-Sambre
Walloon Brabant	Barbara Bierlier	18	Chaumont-Gistoux
Walloon Brabant	Julia Griffi	23	Tubize
West Flanders	Alexia Coussement	23	Moen
West Flanders	Aloysi Desnouck	18	Adinkerke
West Flanders	Alycia Vandenabeele	20	Deerlijk
West Flanders	Caroline Delforge	18	Roeselare
West Flanders	Hélène Frederiks	23	Bellegem
