= Henri Mouton (politician) =

Belgian politician (1933–2021)

Personal details
- Born: 16 August 1933 Naninne, Namur, Belgium
- Died: 21 April 2021 (aged 87)
- Party: Socialist Party

Henri Mouton (16 August 1933 – 21 April 2021) was a Belgian politician. Mouton served in the Belgian Senate from 1981 to 1985.

== Early life ==
Henri Mouton was born on 16 August 1933 in Naninne in Namur Province.

Mouton studied physical education at the Provincial Institute of Liège, graduating in 1956.

Mouton became the professor of physical education at the Athénée de Hannut in 1958, a position he remained in until 1981.

He became the director of the Lycée de Hannut in 1981.

== Political career ==
Mouton served in the Belgian Senate from 1981 to 1985.

== Personal life ==
Mouton died on 21 April 2021.

== Honours ==
Mouton was appointed a Commander of the Order of Leopold on 9 June 1999.
