= Evence-Charles Coppée =

Belgian press director (1953–2022)

- Born: 16 June 1953
- Died: 11 January 2022 (aged 68)
- Occupation: Press director

Evence-Charles Coppée (16 June 1953 – 11 January 2022) was a Belgian press director. He directed the French daily newspaper Libération from 1996 to 2005, succeeded in the position by Serge July. Coppée died on 11 January 2022, at the age of 68.
