= Naninne =

Sub-municipality of the city of Namur, Belgium

Naninne Nanene (Walloon)
- Sub-municipality of Namur
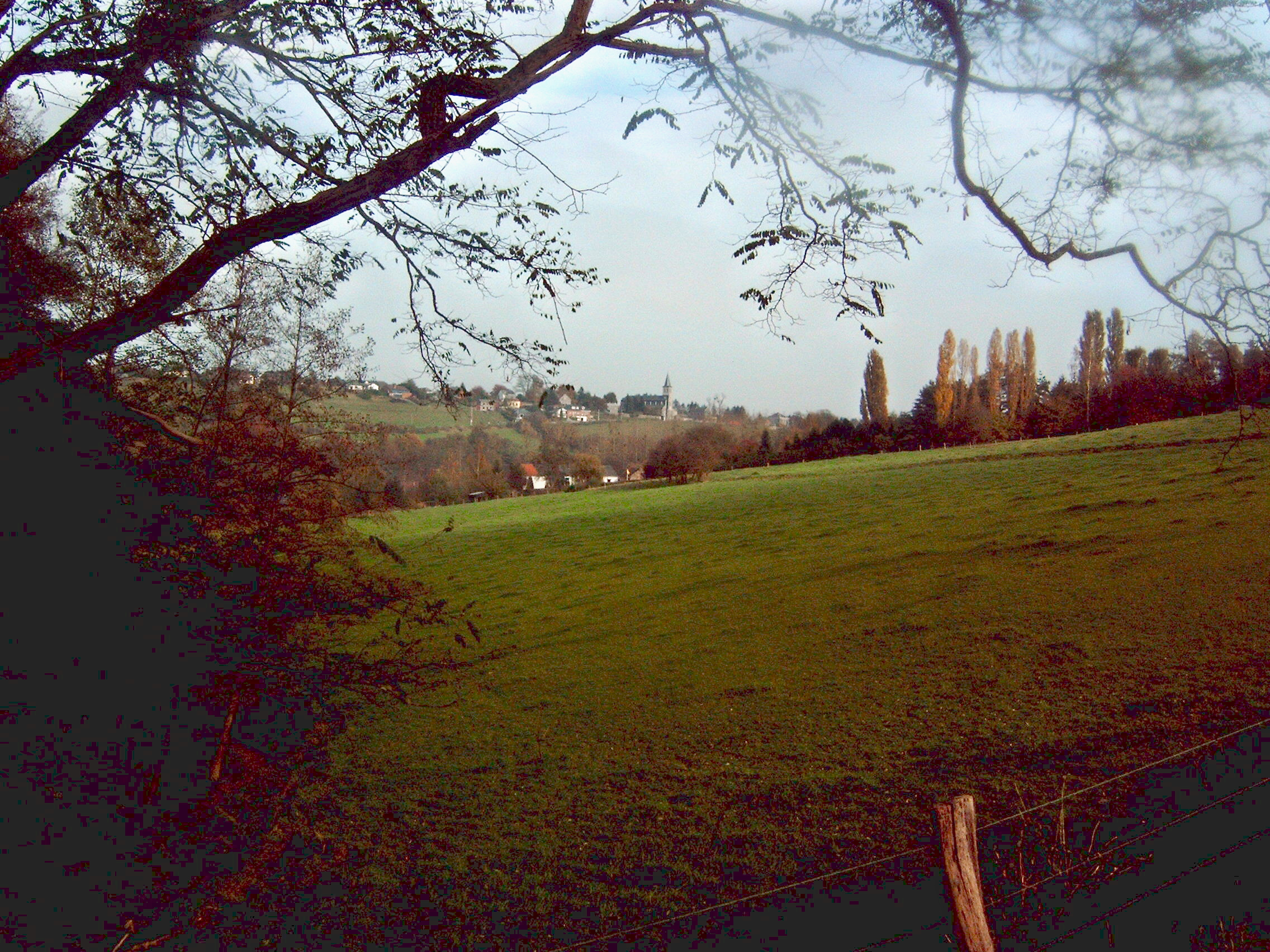

- Location of Naninne in Namur
- Interactive map of Naninne
- Location within Belgium Location within Namur Province
- Coordinates: 50°25′07″N 4°55′26″E
- Country: Belgium
- Community: French Community
- Region: Wallonia
- Province: Namur
- Arrondissement: Namur
- Municipality: Namur

Area
  - Total: 6.13 km^{2} (2.37 sq mi)

Population (2020-01-01)
  - Total: 1,656
  - Density: 270/km^{2} (700/sq mi)
- Postal codes: 5100
- Area codes: 081

Naninne (French pronunciation: [nanin]; Walloon: Nanene) is a sub-municipality of the city of Namur located in the province of Namur, Wallonia, Belgium. It was a separate municipality until 1977. On 1 January 1977, it was merged into Namur.
