= Alfred Léonard =

Belgian politician (1940–2018)

Alfred "Freddy" Léonard (19 December 1940 – 26 January 2018) was a Belgian politician. He served as the mayor of Ferrières, Belgium from 1977 until 1992. Léonard also served as on the Provincial Council of Liège from 1977 until 1985, as well as a deputy in the national Chamber of Representatives of Belgium from 1985 to 1991 and a member of the regional Parliament of Wallonia from 1985 until 1991.

Freddy Léonard died on 26 January 2018 in Banneux, Belgium, at the age of 77.
