= Luc Beyer de Ryke =

Belgian journalist and politician (1933–2018)

Luc Charles Henri Beyer de Ryke (9 September 1933 – 18 January 2018) was a Belgian journalist and politician. He succeeded Jean Rey as a member of the European Parliament in 1980 and served until 1989. He died in Paris of a ruptured aorta on 18 January 2018, aged 84.
