= Marc Morgan =

Belgian singer-songwriter (1962–2020)

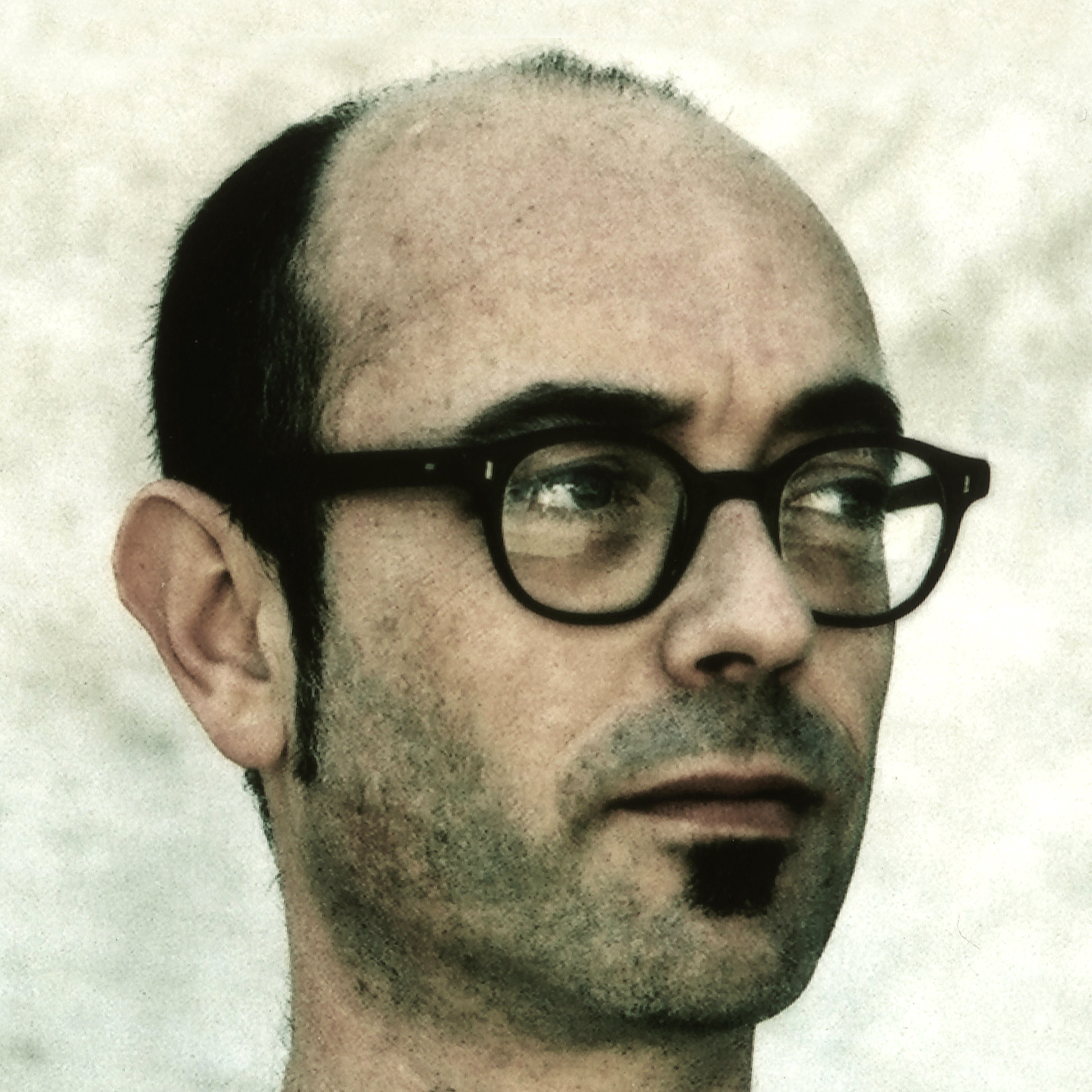
- Morgan in 2001
- Born: 30 April 1962; Huy, Belgium
- Died: 10 January 2020 (aged 57)
- Occupation: Musician
- Years active: 1979—2020

Marc Morgan (30 April 1962 – 10 January 2020) was a Belgian singer and songwriter.

After his talents were discovered by Yves Bigot and Philippe Poustis, Morgan excelled as a pop singer. His single ”Notre Mystère, nos retrouvailles ” reached the French Top 50 in 1993.

Morgan was educated at the École supérieure des arts Saint-Luc in Liège. He also worked as a professor at the École de recherche graphique in Brussels, the École supérieure des arts Le 75 in Woluwe-Saint-Lambert, and the Haute école Albert Jacquard in Namur.

== Albums ==
- Ah ! Quel Massacre ! (1983)
- Tendez vos lèvres (1989)
- Pour la gloire (1993)
- Un cygne sur l'Orénoque (1993)
- Les grands espaces (1996)
- Les parallèles se rejoignent (2001)
- Phantom (2009, 2010, 2011)
- La femme plastique (2010)
- Beaucoup Vite Loin (2011)
- The Tangible Effect Of Love (2012)
- Good Luck Universe! (2016)
