= Nat Neujean =

Belgian sculptor (1923–2018)

- Born: 5 January 1923; Antwerp
- Died: 4 February 2018; Uccle
- Occupation: Sculptor
- Awards: Grand Officer of the Order of Leopold; Grand Officer of the Order of the Crown

Nathanael Neujean (5 January 1923 – 4 February 2018) was a Belgian sculptor from Antwerp. A figurative artist, he mostly worked in plaster and bronze. His works are held in various international collections. He has been honored as a Grand Officer of the Order of Leopold and Grand Officer of the Order of the Crown.

== Biography ==
Neujean was born in Antwerp, 5 January 1923. During the years 1939 to 1941, he was a student at the Academy of Fine Arts in Antwerp. Among his better known busts are those of Tintin (1954) for the Belgian Comic Strip Center in Brussels, Hergé (1958), and Robert Schumann (1987), a bronze bust in the Parc du Cinquantenaire of Brussels. He is also noted for his life-sized nude, La Belle Toscane. Another of his sculptures, a figurative bronze titled Lot's Wife (1968), is in the US at the Valley House Gallery and Sculpture Garden of Dallas, Texas. His mounted bronze of Henry Moore is part of the Collection of Charles Rand Penney, while Tendresse, a bronze, is part of the collection at McNay Art Museum. His work has been exhibited at the Museum of Fine Arts, Boston in 1964, and Rolly-Michaux on Madison Avenue in New York City in 1974.

Facing discrimination as a Jew during World War II, he later did much towards Jewish heritage in Belgium; in January 1963 for instance he produced a number of different models related to the Holocaust at the Palais des Beaux-Arts of Brussels.

== Sources ==
- Gerem, Yves (March 2004). A Marmac Guide to Dallas. Pelican Publishing. ISBN 978-1-58980-199-8.
- Mikhman, Dan (1998). Belgium and the Holocaust: Jews, Belgians, Germans. Berghahn Books. ISBN 978-965-308-068-3.
- Little, Carol Morris (1 January 1996). A Comprehensive Guide to Outdoor Sculpture in Texas. University of Texas Press. ISBN 978-0-292-76036-3.
- Neujean, Nathanael; Museum of Fine Arts, Boston (1964). Nathanael Neujean, March 25 - April 18, [1964]. Museum of Fine Arts.
- New York Media, LLC (10 June 1974). "New York Magazine". Newyorkmetro.com. New York Media, LLC. ISSN 0028-7369.
- Vogel, Donald S. (2000). Memories and Images: The World of Donald Vogel and Valley House Gallery. University of North Texas Press. ISBN 978-1-57441-117-1.
