= Marc Janson =

Belgian-born French painter (1930–2022)

- Born: 21 January 1930; Brussels, Belgium
- Died: 12 January 2022 (aged 91); Paris, France
- Occupation: Painter

Marc Janson (21 January 1930 – 12 January 2022) was a Belgian-born French painter. He was considered to be a surrealist.

== Biography ==
Janson moved to Paris in 1948 and often stayed in Rosselló. Many of his works were acquired by the Fonds national d'art contemporain and exhibited at the Musée d'Art Moderne de Paris. He died in Paris on 12 January 2022, at the age of 91.
