= 2014 in Belgian television =

This is a list of Belgian television related events from 2014.

== Events ==
- 16 March - Axel Hirsoux is selected to represent Belgium at the 2014 Eurovision Song Contest with his song "Mother". He is selected to be the fifty-sixth Belgian Eurovision entry during Eurosong held at the Sportpaleis in Antwerp.
- 3 May - Tom De Man wins the third season of The Voice van Vlaanderen.
- 24 October - 15-year-old Mentissa Aziza wins the first season of The Voice Kids.

== Television shows ==
=== 1990s ===
- Samson en Gert (1990–present)
- Familie (1991–present)
- Thuis (1995–present)

=== 2000s ===
- Mega Mindy (2006–present)

=== 2010s ===
- ROX (2011–present)
- The Voice van Vlaanderen (2011–present)
- Belgium's Got Talent (2012–present)

== Networks and services ==
=== Launches ===
Network	Type	Launch date	Notes	Source
Comedy Central	Cable television	20 January		

=== Closures ===
Network	Type	End date	Notes	Sources
MGM Channel	Cable and satellite	9 November		
OP12	Cable and satellite	31 December		

== Deaths ==
Date	Name	Age	Cinematic Credibility
12 March	Jean Vallée	72	Belgian singer & TV host

== See also ==
- 2014 in Belgium
