= Norbert Beuls =

Belgian footballer and manager

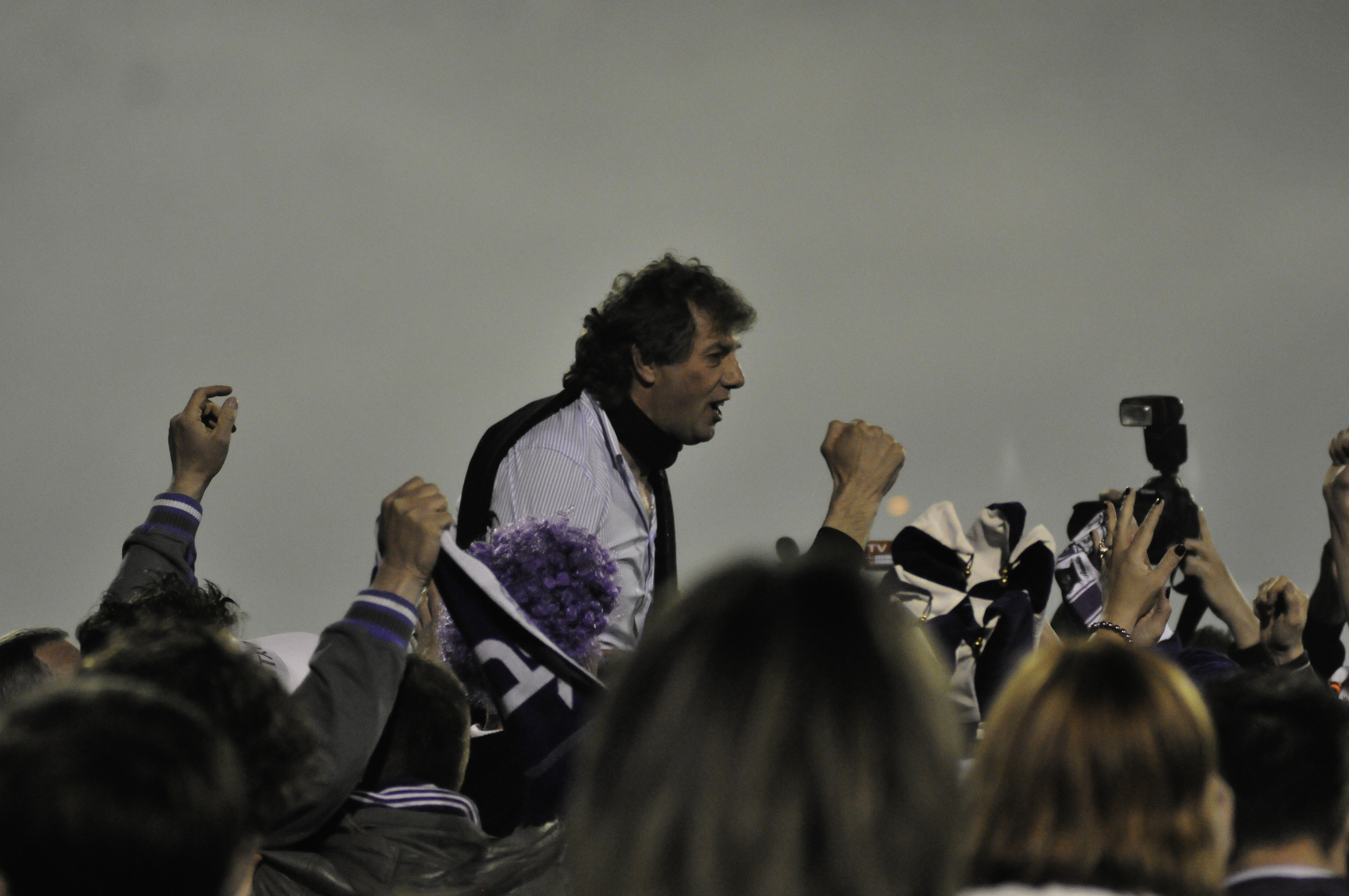

Personal information
- Date of birth: 13 January 1957
- Place of birth: Kleine Spouwen, Belgium
- Date of death: 19 February 2014 (aged 57)
- Place of death: Belgium
- Position: Defender

Youth career
- 1968–1977: Rapid Spouwen

Senior career*
Years	Team	Apps	(Gls)
1977–1985	Tongeren		
1984–1985	→ FC Antwerp	34	(2)
1985–1990	Charleroi		
1990–1994	Racing Genk		

Managerial career
- 1994: Racing Genk
- 2006–2010: Spouwen-Mopertingen
- 2010–2012: Patro Eisden
- 2014: Spouwen-Mopertingen
- * Club domestic league appearances and goals

Norbert Beuls (13 January 1957 – 19 February 2014) was a Belgian footballer and football manager.

== Club career ==
He came through the youth ranks at hometown club Rapid Spouwen and joined Tongeren in 1977. After a season on loan at FC Antwerp he moved to Charleroi in 1985 before fe finished his career at Racing Genk.

== Managerial career ==
Beuls was manager of Genk alongside Pierre Denier and also coached Spouwen-Mopertingen and Patro Eisden with whom he won promotion to the Belgian Third Division in 2011. He returned to Spouwen in 2014 but suddenly died on 19 February 2014.

== Personal life ==
Beuls was married and had 4 sons.
