= Romanie Schotte =

Belgian model (born 1997)

- Born: Bruges, Belgium
- Height: 1.75 m (5 ft 9 in)
- Beauty pageant titleholder
- Title: Miss Belgium 2017
- Hair color: Brown
- Eye color: Brown
- Major competitions: Miss Belgium 2017 (Winner); Miss World 2017 (Unplaced)

Romanie Schotte is a Belgian model and beauty pageant titleholder from Bruges who was crowned Miss Belgium 2017 and represented Belgium at the Miss World 2017 pageant.

== Miss Belgium 2017 ==
Schotte, at the time a 19-year-old Business Management student, was crowned "Miss Belgium 2017" by Lenty Frans (Miss Belgium 2016) on 14 January 2017.

After winning the title, Schotte was criticized for her response to a racist comment on Instagram. The Centre for Equal Opportunities and Opposition to Racism opened an investigation but found there was no wrongdoing on her part.

Schotte took part in the Miss World 2017 pageant but did not reach the finals.

== Personal life ==
In June 2019 Schotte married Stefan Talpe. In May 2021 the couple announced that they were expecting their first child.

Awards and achievements
Preceded by Lenty Frans	Miss Belgium; 2017	Succeeded by Angeline Flor Pua
