= Jean Namotte =

Belgian politician (1934–2019)

Jean Namotte (1 December 1934 – 6 April 2019) was a Belgian politician for the Socialist Party (PS), who was a member of the Parliament of Wallonia, representing Liège from 1995 to 2004.
