= Carnival of Aalst =

Annual event preceding Ash Wednesday in Aalst, Belgium

Carnival of Aalst Aalst Carnaval
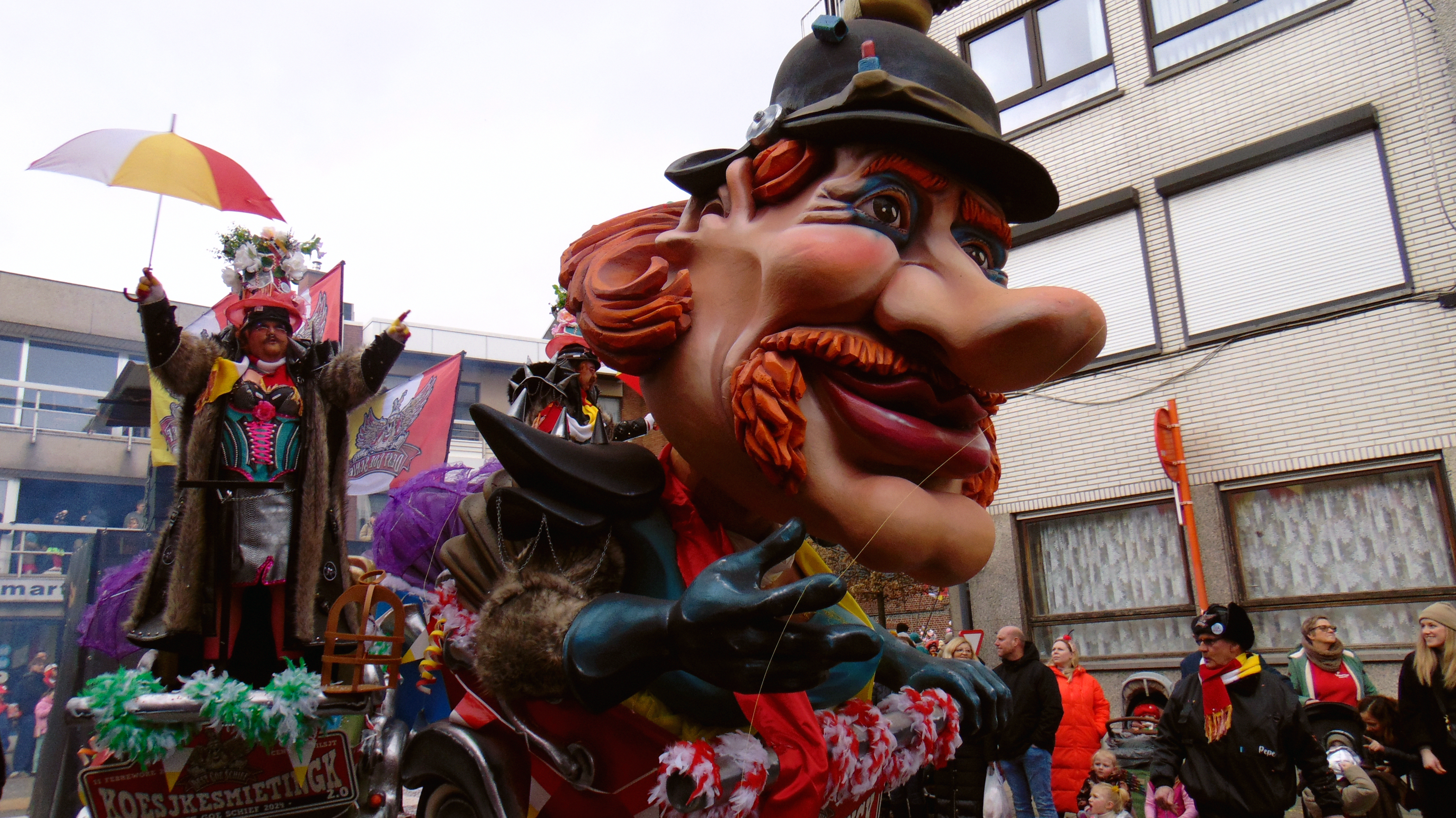
- The edition of 2024, the group 'Dest - Goe Schief' with Koesjkesmietingk (Meeting of baby carriages)
- Status: Active
- Genre: Carnival
- Date: February or March
- Frequency: Annually
- Location: Aalst
- Country: Belgium

The Carnival of Aalst (Dutch: Aalst Carnaval, Brabantian: Oilsjt Carnaval) is an annual three-day event in Aalst, East Flanders, Belgium. The carnival is celebrated in the days preceding Ash Wednesday. It is mainly a street happening; the celebrants dance on the town squares and visit café after café.

The carnival was recognised as a Masterpiece of the Oral and Intangible Heritage of Humanity by UNESCO in 2010, but was removed in 2019 amid controversy over the use of antisemitic stereotypes in the carnival parade, in addition to previous controversies. It was the first time anything was removed from UNESCO's Intangible Heritage of Humanity list.

== History ==
The Carnival of Aalst has its origin in the Middle Ages. Cavalcades were held since 1851, yet without organisation by the city council. Only the events starting from 1923 are counted as official editions, as that was when Aalst city council began to organise the parade.

In 2010, the Carnival of Aalst was recognised as one of the Masterpieces of the Oral and Intangible Heritage of Humanity by UNESCO. In December 2019, the mayor of Aalst, Christoph D'Haese (N-VA), applied to UNESCO to have his city's carnival removed from the Representative List of the Intangible Cultural Heritage of Humanity, pre-empting its expected removal for ongoing use of antisemitic stereotypes. On 13 December 2019, UNESCO withdrew its recognition of Aalst Carnival as part of the cultural heritage of humanity.

== Course of events ==
The carnival starts on Sunday and ends on Shrove Tuesday. On the Saturday evening before the start of the carnival, in the De Werf cultural centre, a humorous city council session takes place, in which Prince Carnival receives the city key and local politicians are mocked. The session is held in the local dialect (Oilsjters) and is done by experienced carnival members rather than the actual city council.

On Sunday the great carnival parade crosses the streets, a spectacle involving tens of thousands of visitors every year. Over 100 floats are included, and since 1970 the carnival groups are only from Aalst itself. Apart from these large groups smaller 'loose groups' participate; they lay their focus more on mockery and satire than the decorative aspect. These 'small' groups can number as many as 200.

The Monday parade has a different atmosphere than the Sunday one; the floats don't follow the strict Sunday order of appearance. In the evening, prizes are awarded based on points given by judges on Sunday. In addition, a yearly Broom Dance by the Gilles of Aalst takes place, followed by the "onion throw". Prince Carnival and party committee members throw onion-sized candies from the balcony of the city hall; some of them include numbers matching prizes and one special prize: a golden onion, uniquely designed for that year's carnival. In the evening, just as on Monday, many town squares are the centre of celebration.

On Tuesday the Voil Jeanetten stoet (Aalst dialect for "Parade of the Dirty Sissies") goes through the streets. In this parade, men walk around in women's clothes and props such as a bird cage, a herring, fake breasts, corsets, a fur coat, a worn out umbrella and a stroller. This tradition originates from the history of Aalst, when the lower class was too poor to buy or make a beautiful carnival costume. Instead, the men put on the old and worn clothes of their wives. In the evening, a traditional effigy burning takes place to end the carnival event. To extend the time until the burning of the giant puppet, the participants whistle and shout aloud, but once the puppet catches fire the carnival comes to its emotional end with a third evening of celebrations.

Since 1953, each year a Prince Carnival is elected; he can reign the city during the entire three-day event. Also Emperor Carnival plays an important role. To become Emperor, one needs to be Prince in three prior events.

== Controversies ==
In 2005, the Saudi ambassador to Belgium conveyed a protest from the Arab League at the hurtful depiction of Muslims in the carnival parade after one group had dressed as terrorists in burqas. The mayor of Aalst expressed displeasure at the Belgian government's apology, on the grounds that the carnival had done nothing to apologise for.

=== Accusations of antisemitism ===
In 2013, a group had members who dressed up in SS uniforms and paraded with cans marked Zyklon B, which led to a protest by UNESCO.

In 2019, the carnival group De Vismooil'n entered a float that depicted two Orthodox Jews with hook noses and beards, wearing shtreimels (the fur hats worn by some Hasidic Jews), standing amid bags of cash and guarding a safe, one with a rat on his shoulder. The title of the float was "Sabbatical Year", in reference to the carnival group's decision to save money by recycling elements of previous displays, with a pun on "sabbath" and the Jewish tradition of rest on the Sabbath. The same figures had been used the year before, then representing crusaders, and one hook-nosed head had originally been created as a caricature of a local far-right politician. Unia, the Belgian independent arbitrator for matters concerning discrimination, found that no laws had been broken given the specific context of carnivalesque parody and lack of malicious intent on behalf of the carnival group.

Following the 2019 controversy, a statement was made through the office of the Aalst mayor, Peter Van den Bossche, saying "This doesn't encourage anti-Semitism. ... Two hundred percent it's not anti-Semitic", insisting the depiction had no ill intent and was instead an event steeped in tradition and parody. Nevertheless, then-Belgian Prime Minister, Sophie Wilmès, herself Jewish, vehemently denounced the derogatory Jewish ensembles. The incident led to further widespread condemnation from multiple organisations, including the European Commission.

As a response, Aalst Carnival organisers decided to print advance materials for the 2020 carnival reproducing caricatures of Orthodox Jews. In anticipation of UNESCO's expected reaction, the mayor of Aalst pre-emptively applied to have his city's carnival removed from the World Heritage list. This action of removing oneself voluntarily from the UNESCO World Heritage List had never been done before; thus, there was no customary process for Aalst to follow. Israel called for the 2020 carnival to be canceled because of antisemitism, but the parade continued as scheduled. Under international media scrutiny, the 2020 carnival parade featured two different groups costumed as Jews, one carting along a structure labelled "Wailing Wall" and the other punning on "Youth for Climate" as "Jew for Climate", with participants insisting that their intent was satirical rather than antisemitic.

== Gallery ==
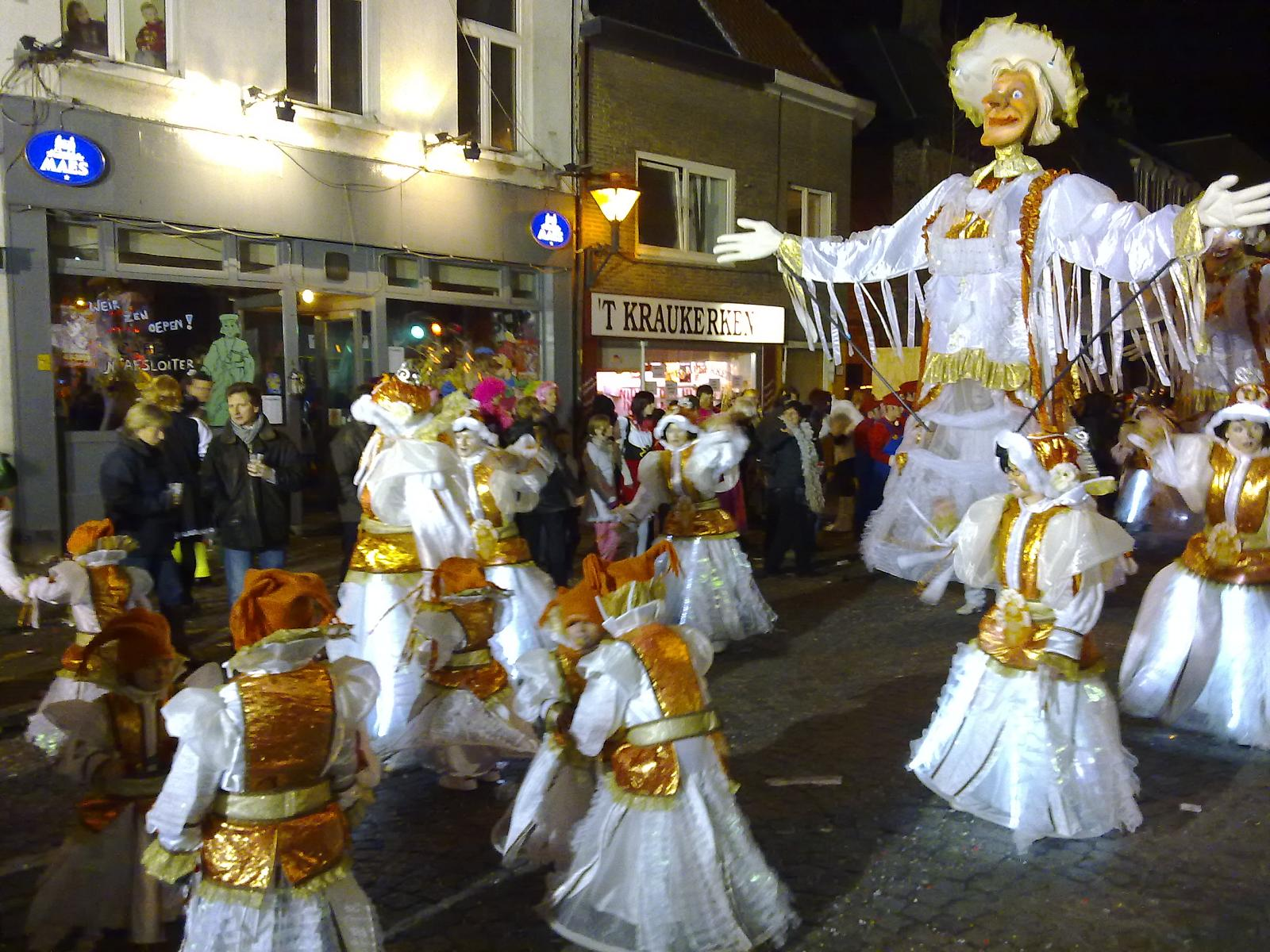
Carnival of Aalst 2009

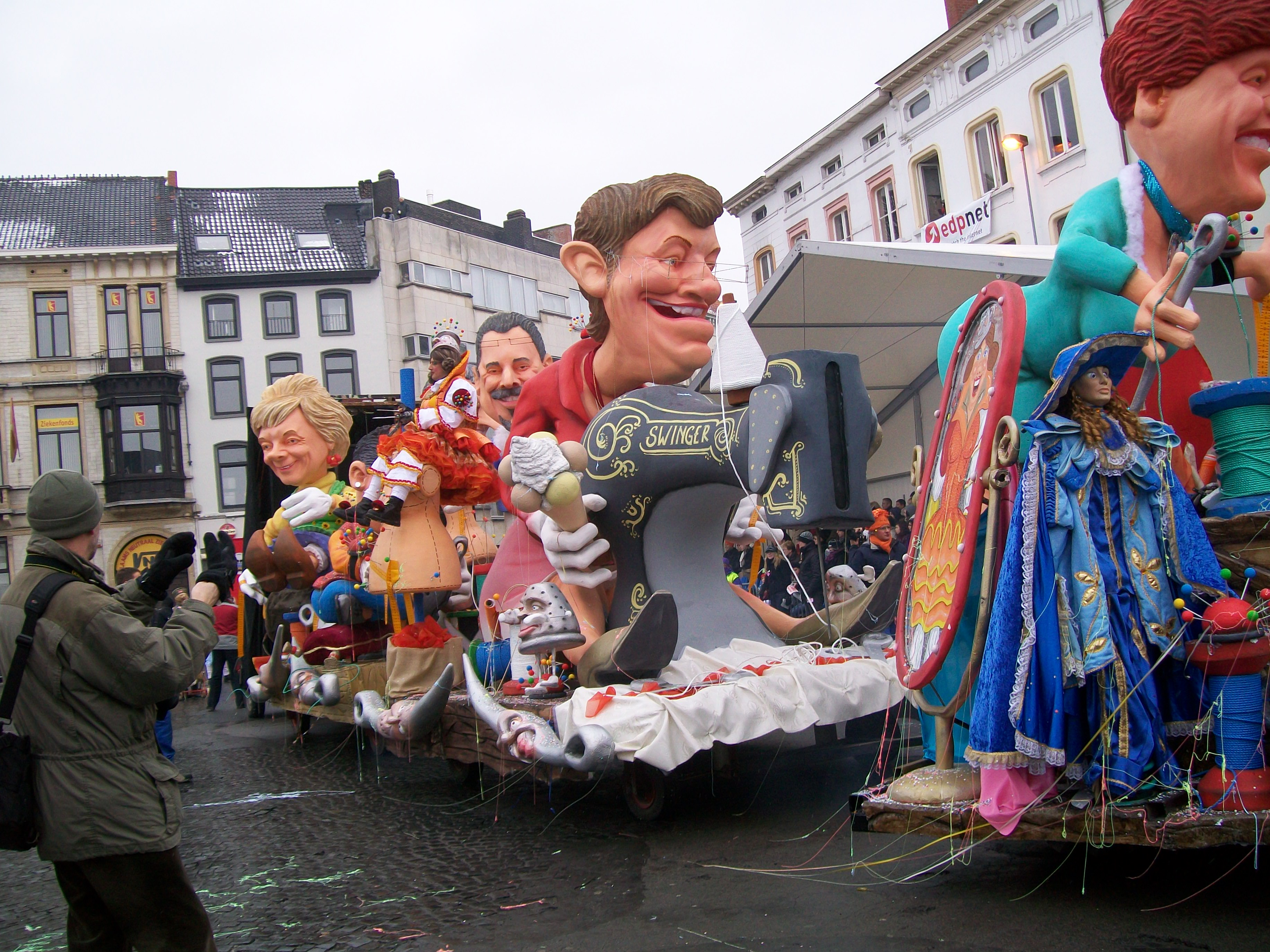
Carnival of Aalst 2010

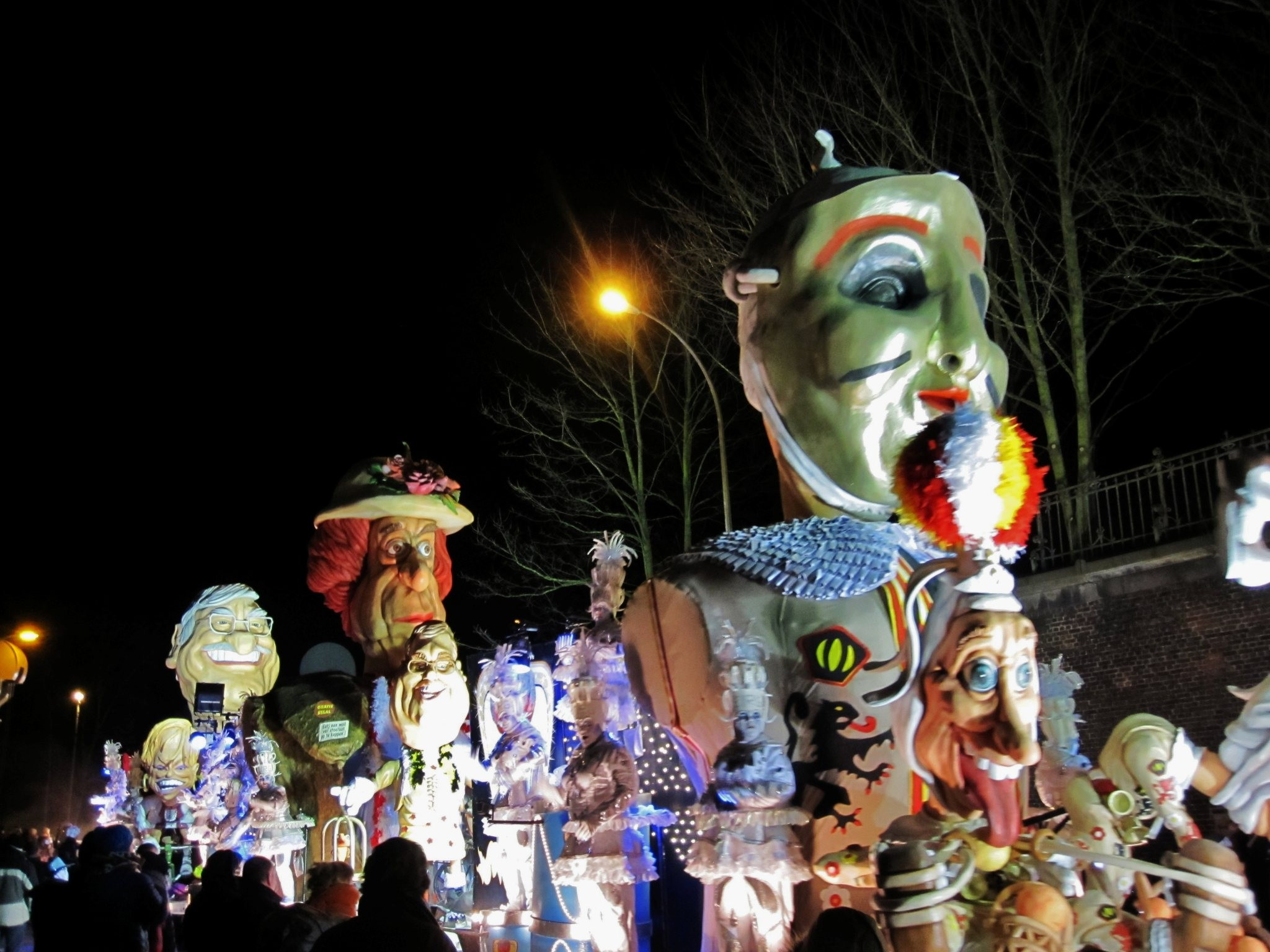
Carnival of Aalst 2013

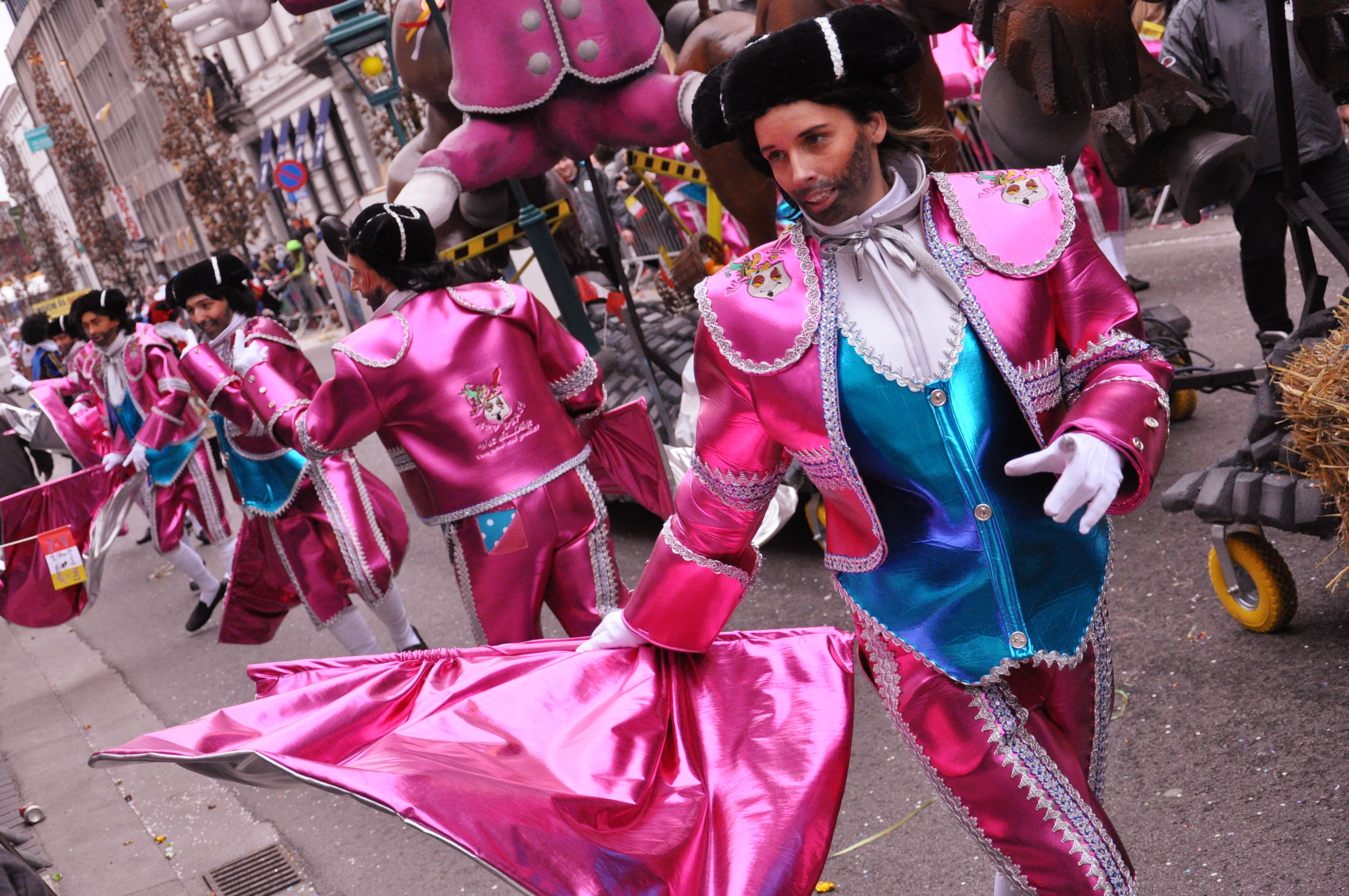
Carnival of Aalst 2017

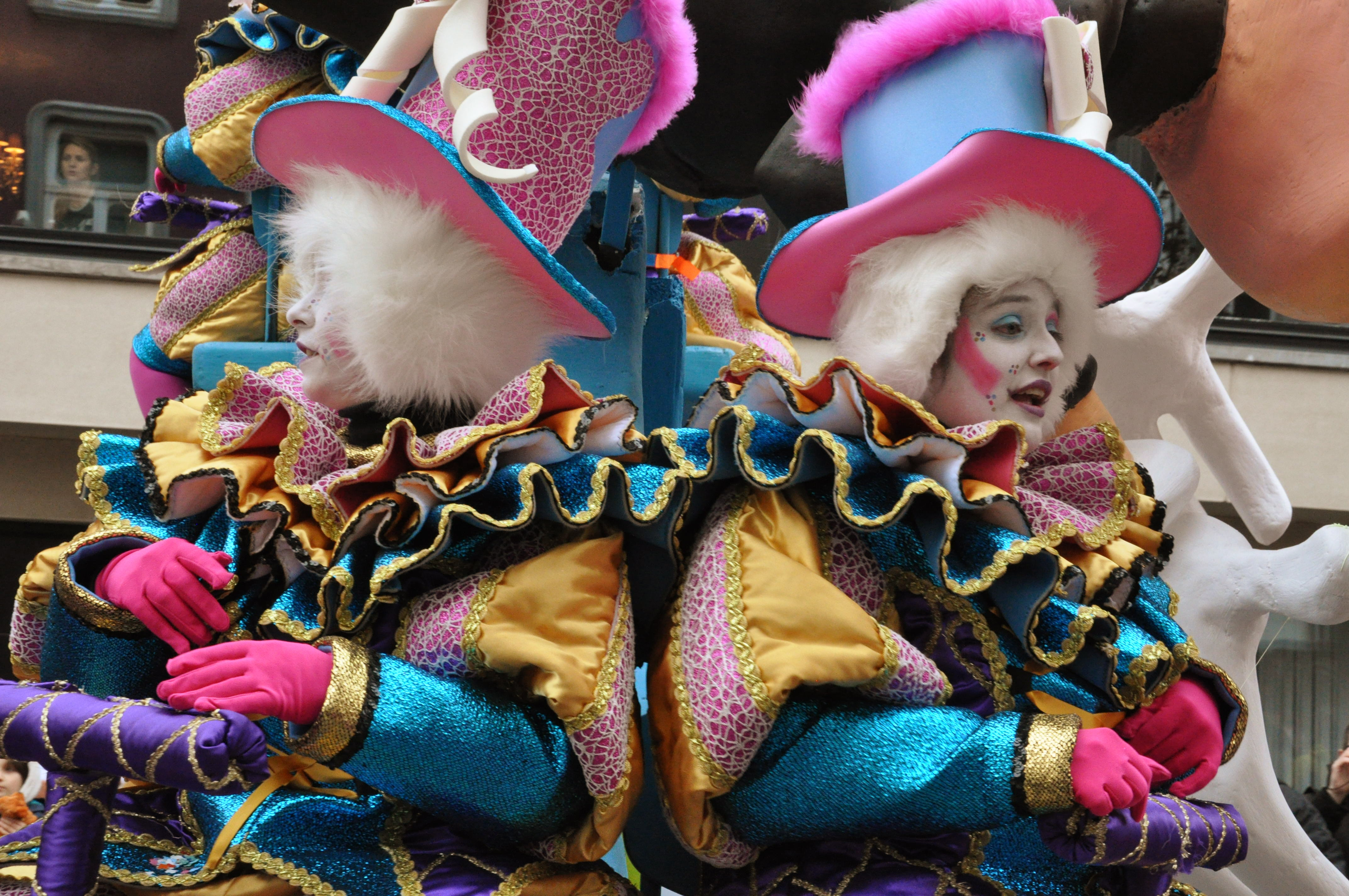
Carnival of Aalst 2017

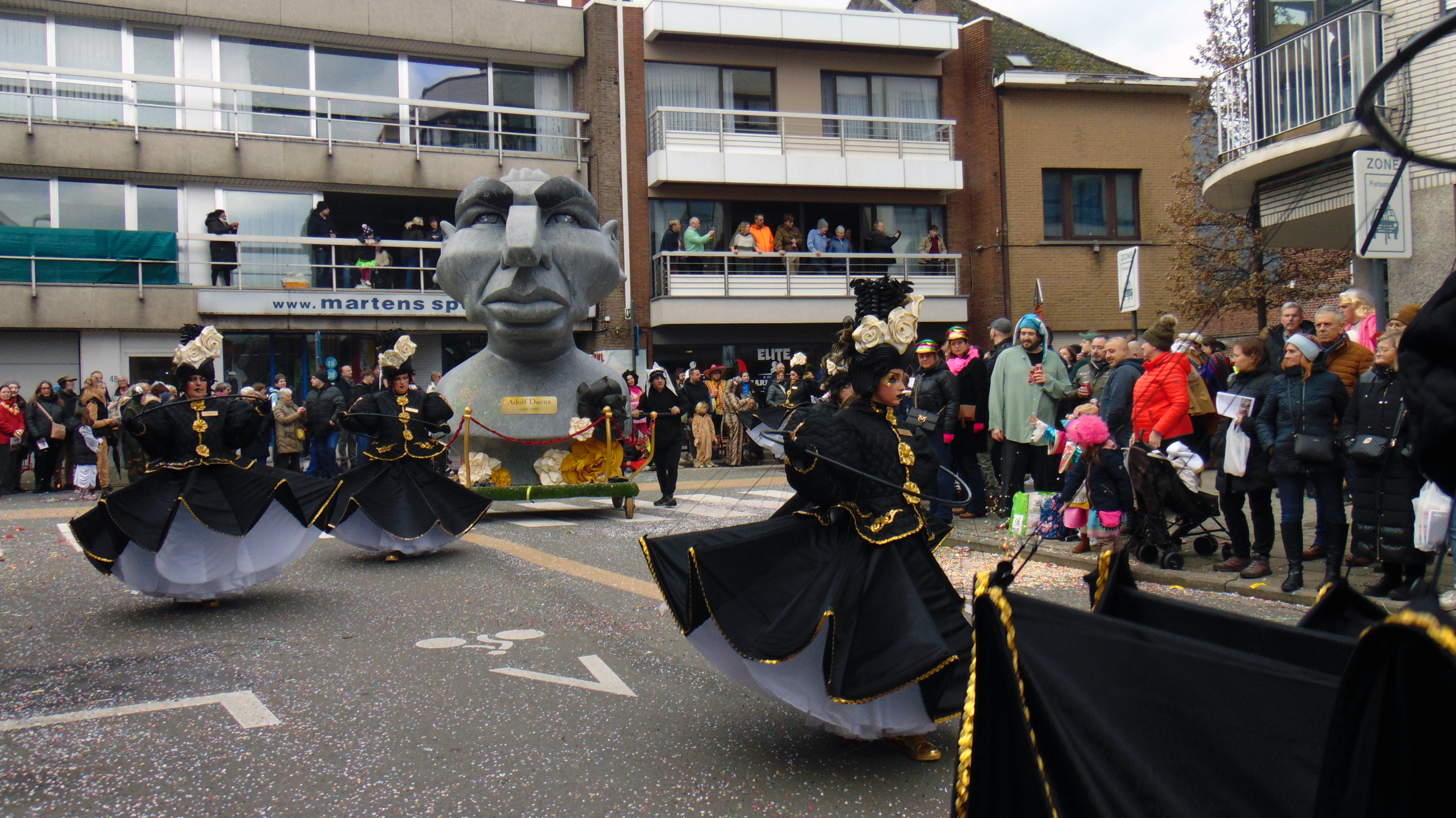
Carnival of Aalst 2024

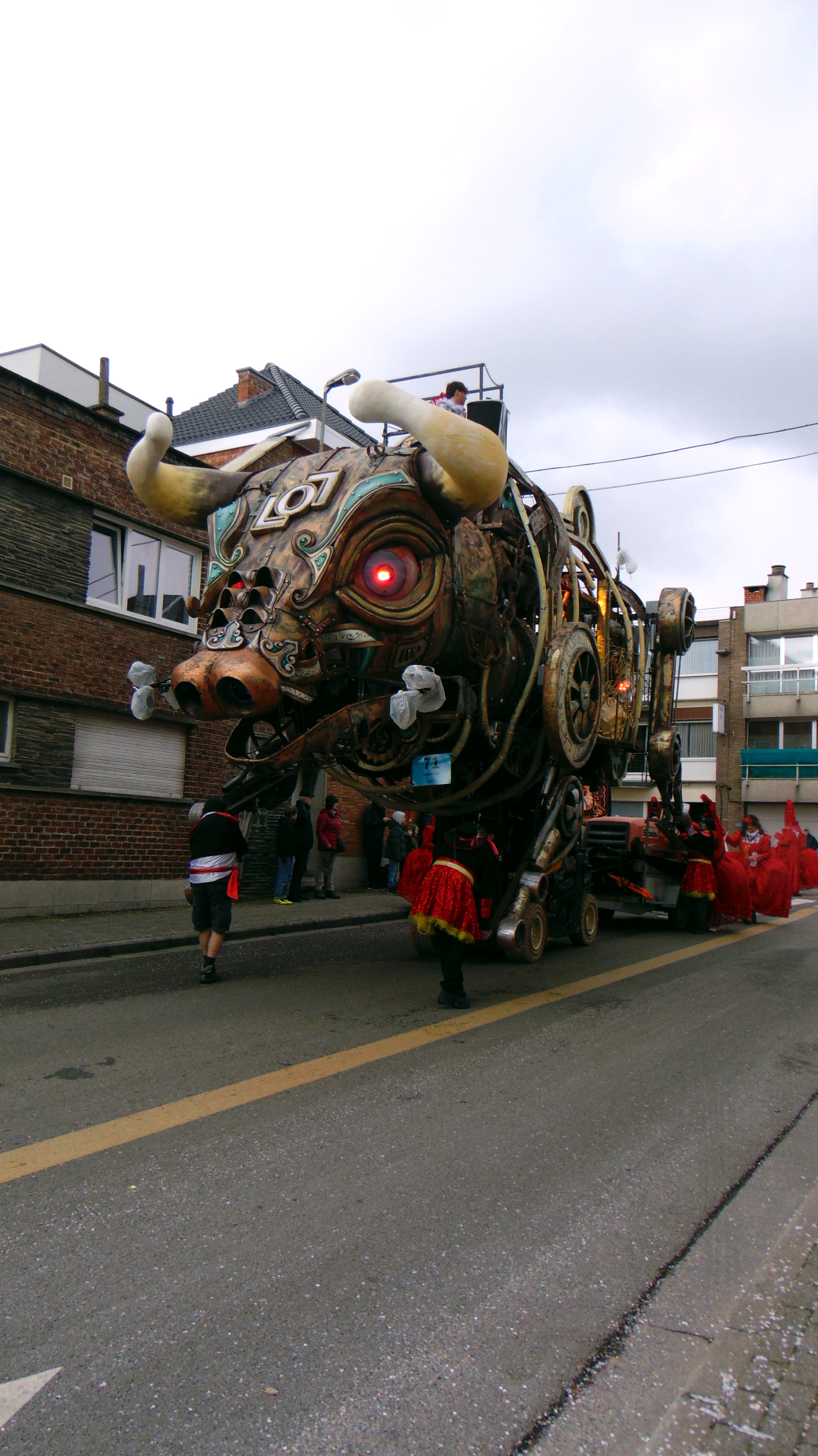
Carnival of Aalst 2024
