= Angeline Flor Pua =

Miss Universe Belgium 2019, beauty pageant titleholder, Filipino Belgian model

- Born: 17 April 1995 (age 31); Antwerp, Belgium
- Height: 1.68 m (5 ft 6 in)
- Beauty pageant titleholder
- Title: Miss Philippines Europe 2016; Miss Antwerp 2018; Miss Belgium 2018
- Hair color: Black
- Eye color: Brown
- Major competitions: Miss Antwerp 2018 (Winner); Miss Belgium 2018 (Winner); Miss World 2018 (Top 30); Miss Universe 2019 (Unplaced)

Angeline Flor Pua (born 17 April 1995) is a Belgian model and beauty pageant titleholder who was crowned Miss Belgium 2018. As Miss Belgium, she represented Belgium at Miss World 2018 and Miss Universe 2019.

== Life and career ==
=== Early life ===
Flor Pua was born in Antwerp on 17 April 1995. Her father is a Chinese-Filipino while her mother is Filipino and works in an ironing shop.

=== Pageantry ===
In 2016, she was crowned Miss Philippines Europe 2016. Later, she was crowned Miss Antwerp 2018 on 17 September 2017 in De Panne. As Miss Antwerp, she earned the right to compete at Miss Belgium 2018. She went on to be crowned Miss Belgium 2018, and represented Belgium in the Miss World 2018 competition. She placed in the Top 30.

After Elena Castro Suarez chose to compete at Miss World 2019, Angeline represented Belgium at the Miss Universe 2019 competition where she was unplaced.

Awards and achievements
Preceded by Zoé Brunet	Miss Universe Belgium; 2019	Succeeded by Dhenia Covens
Preceded by (West Flanders) Romanie Schotte	Miss Belgium; 2018	Succeeded by (Antwerp Province) Elena Castro Suarez
Preceded by Élisabeth Van Dijk	Miss Antwerp; 2017	Succeeded by Elena Castro Suarez
