= Patrick Lebon =

Belgian film director and screenwriter (1940–2021)

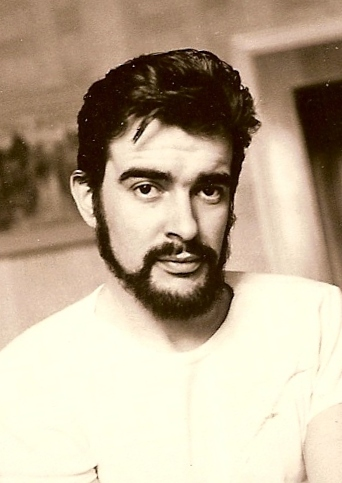
- Patrick Lebon
- Born: 2 January 1940; Antwerp, Belgium
- Died: 3 February 2021 (aged 81)
- Occupations: Film Director; Screenwriter

Patrick Lebon (2 January 1940 – 3 February 2021) was a Belgian film director and screenwriter.

== Biography ==
Lebon studied at the Netherlands Film Academy in Amsterdam. He graduated in 1965, directing the film Huuh huuh. He directed feature films Salut en de kost, Hellegat, Zaman, and Paniekzaaiers, which was the 11th greatest Belgian cinematic success, garnering 500,000 viewers. It is now the 17th greatest Belgian feature film of all time.

Patrick Lebon died on 3 February 2021 at the age of 81, one month and one day after his birthday.
