= Gérard de Sélys =

Belgian journalist (1944–2020)

- Born: 29 March 1944; Brussels, Belgium
- Died: 3 January 2020 (aged 75)
- Occupations: Journalist; Writer

Gérard de Sélys (29 March 1944 – 3 January 2020) was a Belgian journalist and writer. He began his career in 1970 as a freelance journalist and photographer in Belgium, focusing on social issues. He joined RTBF in 1973, where he worked as a journalist, radio show host, and web pioneer until 2004.
