= Wiet Van Broeckhoven =

Belgian radio presenter and writer (1949–2019)

Wiet Van Broeckhoven (19 September 1949 – 4 January 2019) was a Belgian radio presenter and writer, best known as the host of the radio music shows Njam Njam and Hitbox. He was known for his Beatle haircut and knack for humorous one-liners.

== Life and career ==
Originally a civil servant, he presented the music shows Njam Njam and Hitbox on Radio 2, where Etienne Smet made the musical selections. Van Broeckhoven was known for his playful style, coming up with humorous one-liners and puns in between musical segments. Many of these quotes and one-liners were later compiled in various books.

Van Broeckhoven was once temporarily suspended from airplay because he had played an anti-religious song by Robert Long on the air. Another time he made a joke about Roy Orbison, claiming that "his glasses might benefit from a premium for insulated glazing". The president of the Belgian Roy Orbison fanclub sent him a message that he and the club members would come to the radio station to protest. When they indeed turned up, Van Broeckhoven waited until the evening fell before he snuck away.

At the end of the 1980s, he presented similar music-themed shows at radio channel Magdalena. When the commercial radio station Radio Donna went in the air in 1992 Van Broeckhoven worked together with Michel Follet and Erik Strieleman. He presented the show Nogal Wiedes for many years.

During the last years of his life, he was very ill, bedridden, and he no longer appeared in public. He died at the age of 69.

== Bibliography ==
- De Negende van Beethoven was een jongen, 1990.
- Leeuwentemmer zoekt getemde leeuw, 1991.
- Kannibaal bestelt ober, 1995.
