= Caroline Pauwels =

Belgian scholar and rector (1964–2022)

- Born: 23 June 1964; Sint-Niklaas, East Flanders, Belgium
- Died: 5 August 2022 (aged 58)
- Scientific career
- Fields: Communication studies
- Institutions: Vrije Universiteit Brussel

Caroline Pauwels (23 June 1964 – 5 August 2022) was a Belgian communication studies scholar and rector of the Vrije Universiteit Brussel, serving from September 2016 to February 2022.

In 2020, Caroline Pauwels served as one of the five members of Turkey Tribunal's steering committee members. Turkey Tribunal is an independent "people's tribunal" registered as an NGO in Belgium.

== Career ==
Caroline Pauwels studied philosophy and communication studies, and worked in the cabinet of European Commissioner Karel Van Miert. She left the European Commission for a career in research, and earned her PhD in 1995. Her dissertation focused on the audiovisual policy of the European Union. She was director of the SMIT research centre from 2000 to 2016. She held a Jean Monnet Chair from 2012 to 2016.

In April 2016, she was elected rector of the Vrije Universiteit Brussel for the term 2016–2020.

== Death ==
She died on 5 August 2022 at the age of 58.
