= Jean-Marie Léonard =

Belgian politician (1943–2021)

Member of the Chamber of Representatives of Belgium
- In office 9 May 1990 – 12 April 1995

Member of the Parliament of Wallonia
- In office 12 June 1990 – 12 June 2004

Personal details
- Born: 14 July 1943 Flémalle, Belgium
- Died: 9 August 2021 (aged 78)
- Party: PS

Jean-Marie Léonard (14 July 1943 – 9 August 2021) was a Belgian politician. A member of the Socialist Party (PS), he served in the Chamber of Representatives of Belgium from 1990 to 1995 and the Parliament of Wallonia from 1990 to 2004.

Léonard graduated from École normale and became a primary schoolteacher. He was President of the Union Socialiste Communale de Flémalle and served in the cabinets of Minister-Presidents Jean-Maurice Dehousse and Yvan Ylieff.

His son, Laurent, served in the Parliament of Wallonia and the Parliament of the French Community.
