= Cathelyne Van den Bulcke =

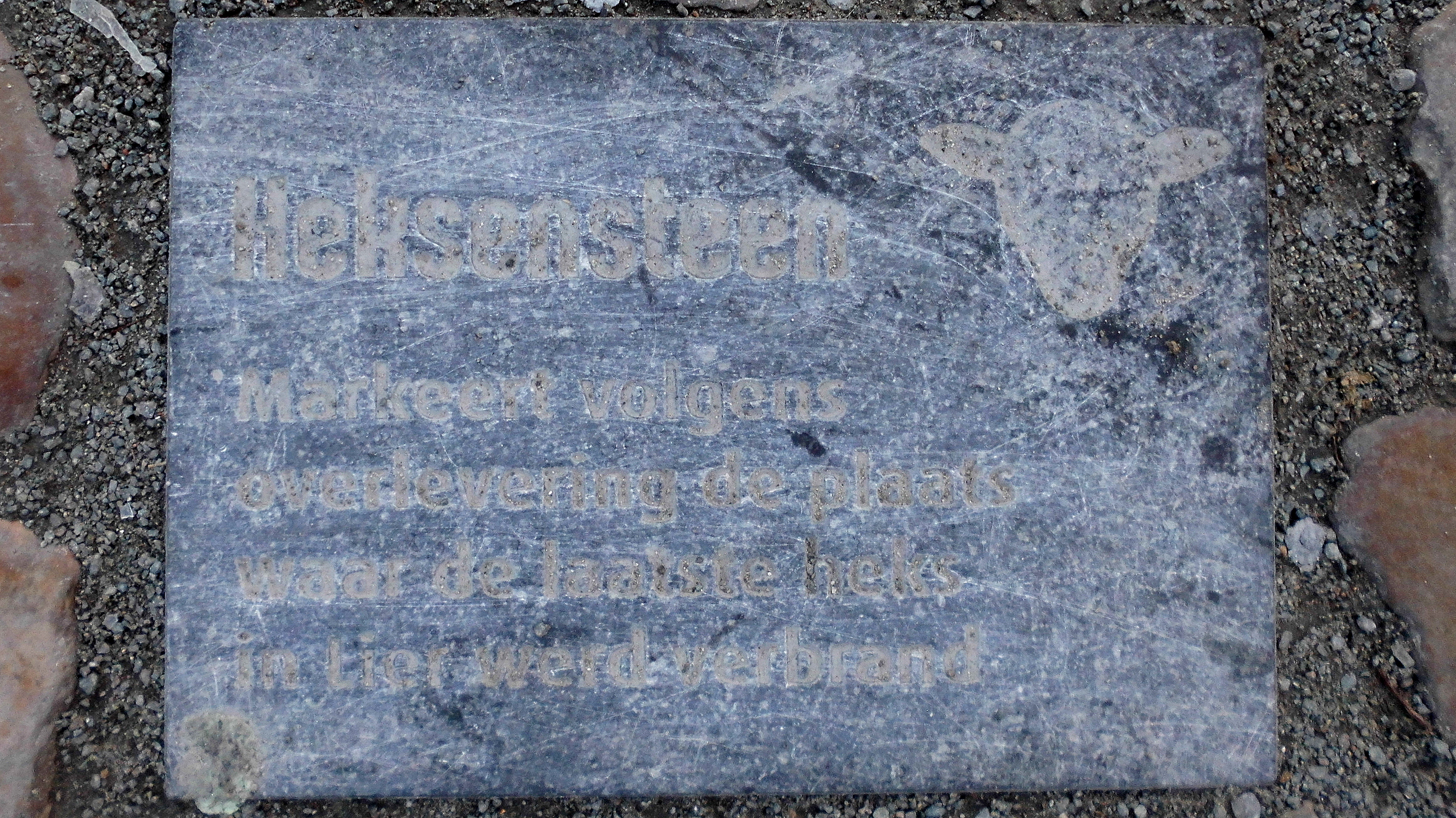
Heksensteen. Memorial

Cathelyne Van den Bulcke (died 1590), was a Flemish woman who was executed judged for witchcraft.

She was burned alive on the market place of Lier on 20 January 1590.

In 2023, she was included in the Flemish Canon, a list of 60 events and persons which defined the history of Flanders.
