= Philippe Henry =

Belgian politician

Philippe Henry (born 23 April 1971) is a Belgian politician.

== Biography ==
Henry was born in Charleroi. He attended University of Liège, becoming the president of the student council, served as student delegate from the University of Liège and the head of Federation of Francophone students in 1994–1995.

In 1995, he graduated with a degree in civil engineering. He finished a master's degree in management in 1997. He worked as a researcher from 1995 to 1999.

He joined the Ecolo party in 1999 and was elected a regional and community member of parliament in 1999 and stayed until 2004.

He served as town councilor in Sprimont and Political Director of Ecolo.

On 16 July 2009, he became the Walloon Minister for the Environment, Spatial Planning, mobility, transportation, and brownfield sites within the Walloon Government under the second term of Minister-President Rudy Demotte. Since 2014, Henry also serves as a Senator.
