= Marcel Neven =

Belgian politician (1943–2026)

Member of the Chamber of Representatives of Belgium
- In office 31 October 1985 – 18 October 1991

Member of the Parliament of Wallonia
- In office 21 May 1995 – 24 May 2014

Personal details
- Born: 27 August 1943 Visé, German-occupied Belgium and Northern France
- Died: 15 August 2026 (aged 82)
- Party: MR
- Occupation: Sports executive

Marcel Neven (27 August 1943 – 15 August 2026) was a Belgian politician of the Reformist Movement (MR).

Neven served in the Chamber of Representatives from 1985 to 1991 and in the Parliament of Wallonia from 1995 to 2014. In 2014, he was named a Commander of the Order of Leopold.

Neven died on 15 August 2026, at the age of 82.
