= Jean Bock =

Belgian politician (1931–2022)

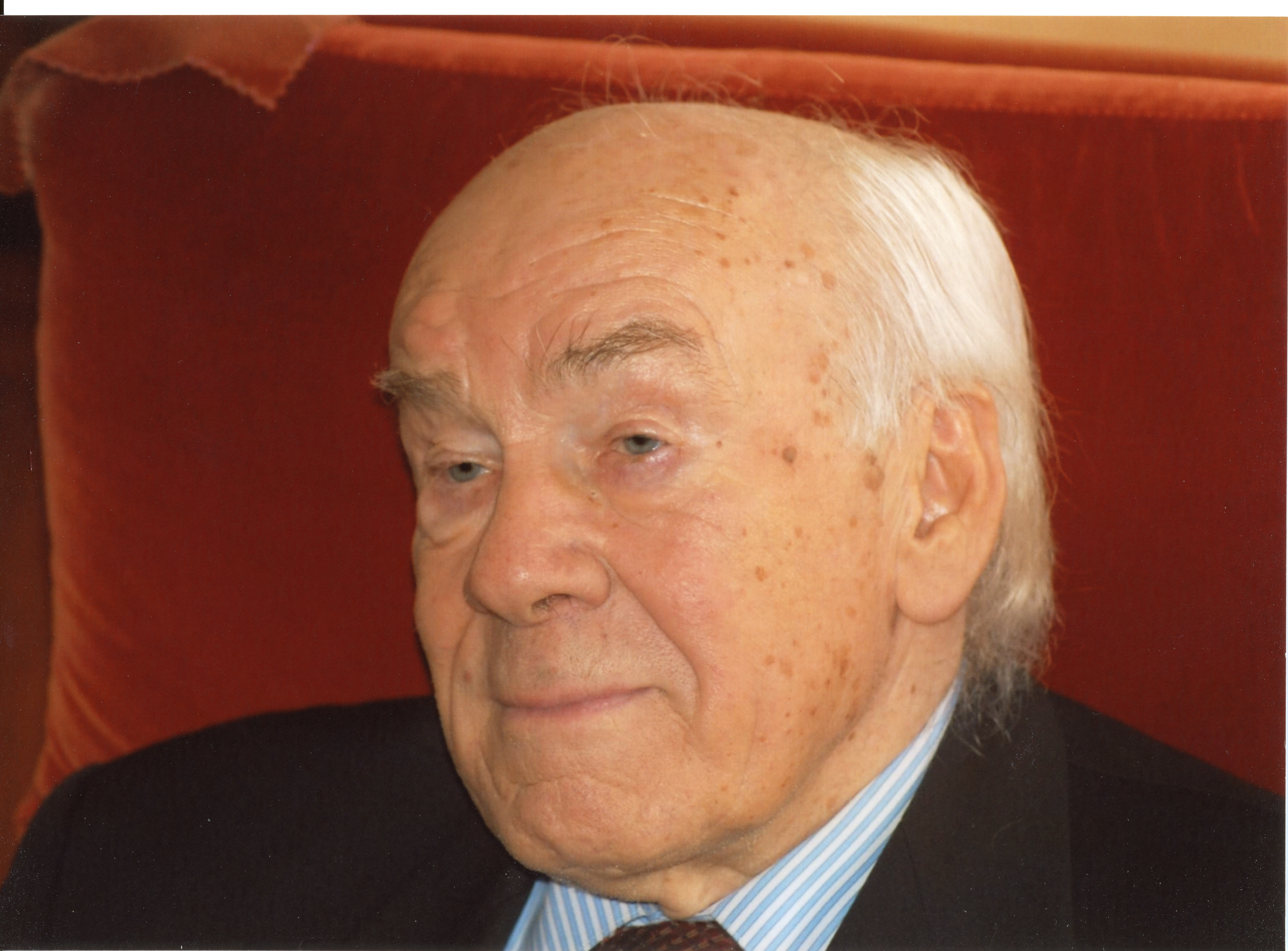
- Bock 2015

Member of the Parliament of Wallonia
- In office 1999–2004

Member of the Senate of Belgium
- In office 1995–1999

Provincial Senator from Luxembourg Province
- In office 1985–1995

Mayor of Gouvy
- In office 1983–2004

Co-Opted Senator
- In office 1981–1985

Personal details
- Born: 15 January 1931 Bovigny, Gouvy, Belgium
- Died: 11 September 2022 (aged 91)
- Party: PRL; MR
- Education: École normale de l’État de Verviers

Jean Bock (15 January 1931 – 11 September 2022) was a Belgian politician. He was a member of the Liberal Reformist Party (PRL) and later the Reformist Movement (MR).

== Life and career ==
Bock's childhood was impacted by the loss of his mother at the end of World War II. He earned a teacher's diploma from the École normale de l’État de Verviers and conducted his military service from 1951 to 1952. He then taught at the École communale de Limerlé before leaving for the Belgian Congo from 1955 to 1960 in the Kasaï Province. There, he met his future wife, Andrée Léonard, with whom he had two children.

Upon his return to Belgium, Bock ran for office in the Provincial Council of Luxembourg in 1961, but was not elected until four years later. He served in the Council from 1965 to 1981 and served in the cabinets of budget minister Willy De Clercq and justice minister Pierre Wigny.

Bock served as a Co-Opted Senator from 1981 to 1985, Mayor of Gouvy from 1983 to 2004, Provincial Senator from Luxembourg Province from 1985 to 1995, a member of the Senate from 1995 to 1999, and in the Parliament of Wallonia from 1999 to 2004.

Jean Bock died on 11 September 2022, at the age of 91.

== Distinctions ==
- Officer of the Order of the Crown (1977)
- Commander of the Order of Orange-Nassau (1994)
- Grand Officer of the Order of Leopold (1999)
- Commander of the Order of Merit of the Grand Duchy of Luxembourg
