= Françoise Van De Moortel =

Belgian journalist

Françoise Van De Moortel (22 August 1941 – 30 December 2005) was a Belgian journalist who was born and died in Ixelles.
