= Annie Servais-Thysen =

Belgian politician (1933–2022)

Member of the Parliament of Wallonia
- In office 1995–2004

Personal details
- Born: 18 June 1933 Xhendremael, Ans, Belgium
- Died: 6 April 2022 (aged 88) Liège, Belgium
- Party: MR
- Education: Complutense University of Madrid

Annie Servais-Thysen (18 June 1933 – 6 April 2022) was a Belgian politician. A member of the Reformist Movement, she served in the Parliament of Wallonia from 1995 to 2004. She died in Liège on 6 April 2022 at the age of 88.
