= 1981 in Belgian television =

List of years in Belgian television
- … 1971; 1972; 1973; 1974; 1975; 1976; 1977; 1978; 1979; 1980; 1981; 1982; 1983; 1984; 1985; 1986; 1987; 1988; 1989; 1990; 1991 …
- Art; Archaeology; Architecture; Literature; Music; Philosophy; Science; +...

This is a list of Belgian television related events from 1981.

== Events ==
- 7 March - Emly Starr is selected to represent Belgium at the 1981 Eurovision Song Contest with her song "Samson". She is selected to be the twenty-sixth Belgian Eurovision entry during Eurosong held at the Amerikaans Theater in Brussels.

== Debuts ==
- 1 November - Tik Tak (1981-1991)

== Births ==
- 17 April - Thomas Vanderveken, TV host
- 22 May - Louis Talpe, actor
- 21 August - Cathérine Kools, actress
- 17 September - Cara Van der Auwera, actress & TV host
- 7 October - Tess Goossens, singer & TV host
