= 1976 in Belgian television =

List of years in Belgian television
- … 1966; 1967; 1968; 1969; 1970; 1971; 1972; 1973; 1974; 1975; 1976; 1977; 1978; 1979; 1980; 1981; 1982; 1983; 1984; 1985; 1986 …
- Art; Archaeology; Architecture; Literature; Music; Philosophy; Science; +...

This is a list of Belgian television related events from 1976.

== Events ==
- 21 January - Pierre Rapsat is selected to represent Belgium at the 1976 Eurovision Song Contest with his song "Judy et Cie". He is selected to be the twenty-first Belgian Eurovision entry during Eurosong.
- 30 March – Belgian television cameras in Israel capture footage of Border Patrol troops smashing doors and windows at the home of Palestinian poet Tawfiq Zayyad.

== Births ==
- 29 October - Ann Van den Broeck, actress & singer
- 2 December - Roel Vanderstukken, actor & singer
