= 1977 in Belgian television =

List of years in Belgian television
- … 1967; 1968; 1969; 1970; 1971; 1972; 1973; 1974; 1975; 1976; 1977; 1978; 1979; 1980; 1981; 1982; 1983; 1984; 1985; 1986; 1987 …
- Art; Archaeology; Architecture; Literature; Music; Philosophy; Science; +...

This is a list of Belgian television related events from 1977.

== Events ==
- 5 February - Dream Express are selected to represent Belgium at the 1977 Eurovision Song Contest with their song "A Million in One, Two, Three". They are selected to be the twenty-second Belgian Eurovision entry during Eurosong held at the Amerikaans Theater in Brussels.
- 18 February – The broadcasting act regionalising public television effectively ends all remaining national television activities.
- December – Decree establishes the status of RTBF.

== Television shows ==
- Rubens: Painter and Diplomat – This historical costume drama is produced as part of the year's Rubens celebrations as a series of five episodes and receives international exposure.

== Networks and services ==
=== Launches ===
Network	Type	Launch date	Notes	Source
RTbis	Cable and satellite	26 March		

=== Conversions and rebrandings ===
Old network name	New network name	Type	Conversion Date	Notes	Source
RTB	RTBF1	Cable and satellite	Unknown		

== Births ==
- 10 February - Catherine Moerkerke, newsreader
- 26 July - Kelly Pfaff, TV host, model, dancer & singer
