= 1979 in Belgian television =

List of years in Belgian television
- … 1969; 1970; 1971; 1972; 1973; 1974; 1975; 1976; 1977; 1978; 1979; 1980; 1981; 1982; 1983; 1984; 1985; 1986; 1987; 1988; 1989 …
- Art; Archaeology; Architecture; Literature; Music; Philosophy; Science; +...

This is a list of Belgian television related events from 1979.

== Events ==
- December – Decree fixes BRT statutes, organisation, and mission in Dutch speaking community.

== Networks and services ==
=== Conversions and rebrandings ===
Old network name	New network name	Type	Conversion Date	Notes	Source
RTbis	Tele 2	Cable and satellite	Unknown		

== Births ==
- 3 January - Dina Tersago, TV host, actress & model
- 19 March - Stan Van Samang, actor & singer
- 21 August - Kevin Janssens, actor
- 27 December - Ann Van Elsen, model & TV & radio host
