= 1985 in Belgian television =

| List of years in Belgian television |
- … 1975; 1976; 1977; 1978; 1979; 1980; 1981; 1982; 1983; 1984; 1985; 1986; 1987; 1988; 1989; 1990; 1991; 1992; 1993; 1994; 1995 …
- Art; Archaeology; Architecture; Literature; Music; Philosophy; Science; +...

This is a list of Belgian television related events from 1985.

== Television shows ==
=== 1980s ===
- Tik Tak (1981-1991)

== Networks and services ==
=== Launches ===
| Network | Type | Launch date | Notes | Source |
|---|---|---|---|---|
| Filmnet | Pay-TV | 1985 | Active in Flanders since 1985, but not fully legal until the 1987 cable decree. | |

== Births ==
- 22 October - Hadise, singer & TV personality

== Deaths ==
| Date | Name | Age | Cinematic Credibility |
|---|---|---|---|
| 28 April | Nand Baert | 53 | Belgian radio & TV host |
