= 2013 in Belgium =

- Decades: 1990s; 2000s; 2010s; 2020s
- See also: Other events of 2013; List of years in Belgium

Events in the year 2013 in Belgium.

== Incumbents ==
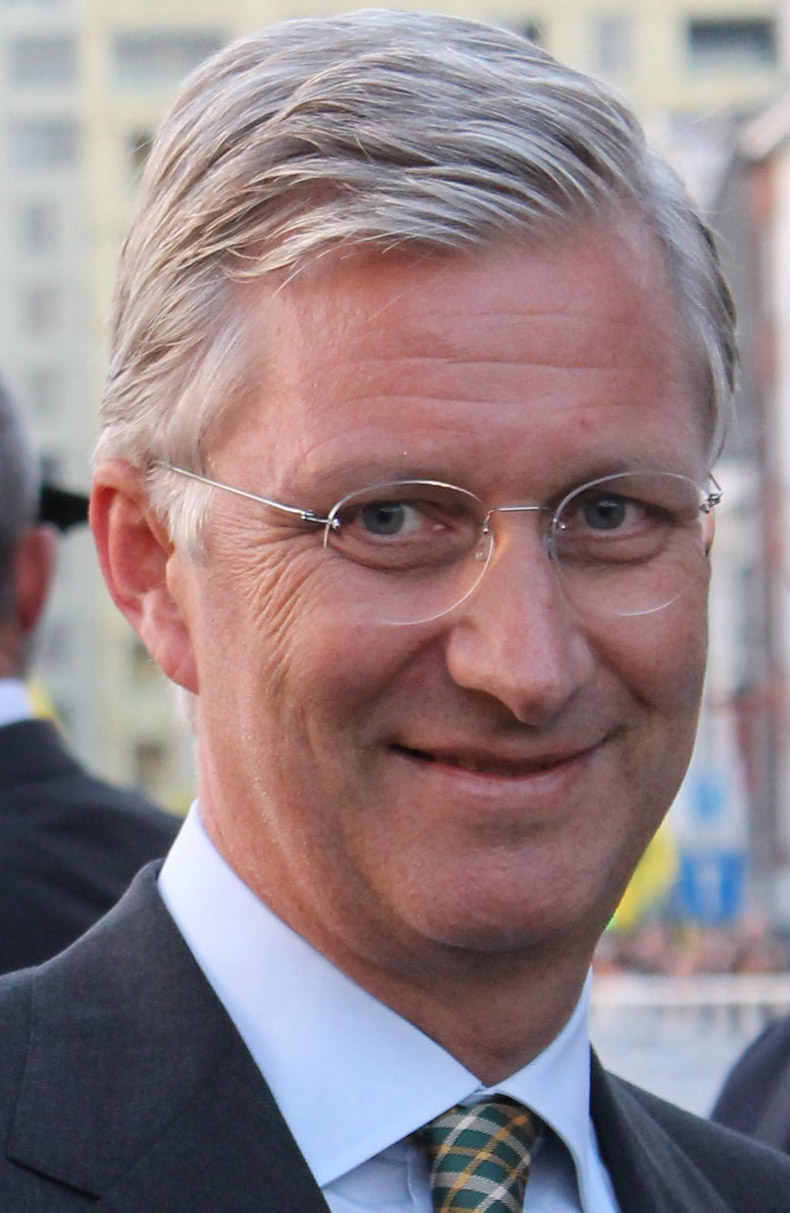
Philippe, king of the Belgians since 21 July 2013

- Monarch: Albert II (until 21 July); Philippe (from 21 July)
- Prime Minister: Elio Di Rupo

== Events ==
- 1 January: Bart De Wever (New Flemish Alliance) becomes mayor of Antwerp.
- 6 January: Noémie Happart crowned Miss Belgium 2013.
- 13 January: Following accusations of tax evasion, Belgium's Dowager Queen Fabiola of Belgium has her annual allowance cut by over 400,000 pounds.
- 9 February: Five people killed in a plane crash at Charleroi airport. The airport was closed shortly after the crash.
- 21 February: 30,000 angry workers take to the streets of Brussels to demonstrate against government austerity plans.
- 4 May: During a railway accident in Wetteren several tank cars filled with acrylonitrile explode.
- 19 May: Anderlecht draw against Zulte Waregem to win the Jupiler Pro League.
- 21 May: Soccer club Beerschot AC declared bankrupt by the Court of Commerce.
- 30 May: Pope Francis accepts the resignation of Aloys Jousten as bishop of Liège
- 3 July: King Albert II announces his pending abdication in favour of his son Philippe.
- 14 July: Jean-Pierre Delville consecrated as bishop of Liège
- 21 July: King Albert II abdicates in favour of his son, King Philippe.
- 25 July: First official heatwave in Belgium since the 2006 European heat wave.
- 25 August: Sebastian Vettel wins the 2013 Belgian Grand Prix.
- 6 October: Samson Kiptoo Bunge wins the Marathon of Brussels in 2:15.49.
- 8 October: François Englert and Briton Peter Higgs awarded the Nobel prize for Physics.
- 12 October: Popgroup Clouseau make a comeback with the song "Vliegtuig" {Airplane} in the Ultratop 50.
- 19 October: Ten parachutists and a pilot die in a plane crash shortly after take-off.
- 3 December: Three heavy pile-ups occur on the A19 motorway due to fog
- 7 December: Veerle Baetens wins the European Film Award for Best Actress. Death of a Shadow wins in the category Best Short Film.

== Sports ==
- 27 February: Ellen van Dijk wins 2013 Le Samyn des Dames
- 23–26 August: Ellen van Dijk wins 2013 Lotto-Belisol Belgium Tour

== Deaths ==
- 4 January – Amanda Stassart, 89, member of the Resistance during World War II and air hostess
- 6 January – Bart Van den Bossche, Flemish singer, actor and radio and television presenter
- 30 January – Roger Raveel, 91, Belgian painter
- 13 February – Robert Senelle, 94, Belgian academic and constitutionalist
- 23 February – Julien Ries, 92, Belgian religious historian, titular archbishop and cardinal of the Catholic Church
- 23 February – Maurice Rosy, 85, Belgian comics writer
- 6 March - Ward de Ravet, 88, Belgian actor
- 7 March - Didier Comès, 70, Belgian comics artist
- 14 March - François Narmon, 79, Belgian businessman and president of Dexia Group and the Belgian Olympic Committee
- 14 March - Vic Nees, 77, Flemish composer, choral conductor, musicologist, and music educator
- 17 March - François Sermon, 89, Belgian footballer
- 4 May - Christian de Duve, 95, Nobel Prize-winning Belgian cytologist and biochemist
- 4 May - Jacques Stockman, 74, Belgian footballer
- 13 May - André Denys, 65, Belgian politician, Governor of the province of East Flanders
- 25 June - Raymond Trousson, 77, Belgian literary historian
- 28 June - Jacques Planchard, 84, Belgian politician, Governor of Belgian Luxembourg
- 1 July - Armand Baeyens, 85, road bicycle racer
- 31 July - Michel Donnet, 96, Belgian pilot who served in the Belgian Army and British Royal Air Force during the World War II
- 10 September - Anne-Sylvie Mouzon, 57, Belgian politician
- 11 September - Fernand Boone, 79, Belgian football goalkeeper
- 17 September - Pierre Macq, 83, physicist
- 23 September - Hugo Raes, 84, writer and poet
- 9 October – Wilfried Martens, 77, former Prime Minister of Belgium
- 20 October – Thomas Blondeau, 35, Flemish writer, poet and journalist
- 15 November – Félix Geybels, 77, footballer
- 30 November
  - Tabu Ley Rochereau, 73, Congolese rumba singer and musician
  - Wilfrid Stinissen, 86, Carmelite priest
- 1 December – Dany Vandenbossche, 57, politician

== See also ==
- 2013 in Belgian television
- 2013 in the European Union
