= 2010 in Belgium =

- Decades: 1990s; 2000s; 2010s; 2020s
- See also: Other events of 2010; List of years in Belgium

Events in the year 2010 in Belgium.

== Incumbents ==
- Monarch: Albert II
- Prime Minister: Yves Leterme (until 22 April; thereafter as caretaker)

== Events ==
=== January ===
- 18 January - Pope Benedict XVI accepts the resignation of Godfried Danneels as archbishop of Mechelen-Brussels and appoints André-Joseph Léonard, bishop of Namur, as his successor.
- 27 January - A gas explosion destroys a building in the centre of Liège, killing 14 and injuring dozens.

=== February ===
- 15 February - Halle train collision causes 18 deaths
- 27 February - André-Joseph Léonard, bishop of Namur, installed as archbishop of Mechelen-Brussels

=== April ===
- 22 April - fall of Leterme II Government
- 23 April - Pope Benedict XVI accepts the resignation of Roger Vangheluwe as bishop of Bruges after revelations of his sexual abuse of minors
- 26 April - Albert II accepts Yves Leterme's resignation as Prime Minister.

=== May ===
- 31 May - Rémy Vancottem appointed the new bishop of Namur in succession to André-Joseph Léonard

=== June ===
- 13 June - Belgian federal election, 2010, Yves Leterme remaining head of caretaker government throughout 2010–11 Belgian government formation
- 20 June - Rémy Vancottem installed as bishop of Namur
- 24 June - judicial police carry out raids at Cardinal Danneels's apartment and the archbishop's palace in Mechelen in a fruitless search for incriminating documents

=== July ===
- 10 July - Jozef De Kesel installed as bishop of Bruges

=== August ===
- 29 August - Lewis Hamilton wins the 66th Belgian Grand Prix at the Circuit de Spa-Francorchamps in Spa, Belgium.

=== October ===
- 21 October - Conclusion of the "Parachute Murder" trial: suspect sentenced to 30 years in prison."Els Clottemans veroordeeld tot 30 jaar opsluiting". Het Belang van Limburg. 21 October 2010.

=== November ===
- 12–13 November - Cyclone Carmen causes flooding

== Deaths ==
- 2 January - René Oreel (87), racing cyclist
- 6 February - Ernest van der Eyken (96), composer, conductor and violist
- 7 February - Jean-Marie Buisset (71), Olympic bobsledder and field hockey player
- 9 February - Davy Coenen (29), mountain biker
- 22 February - Fred Chaffart (74), businessman
- 27 February - Frans De Blaes (100), Olympic sprint canoer
- 22 April - Ann Vervoort (33), singer in Milk Inc.
- 17 May - Bobbejaan Schoepen (85), singer-songwriter and entrepreneur
- 27 July - André Geerts (54), cartoonist (French)
- 21 August - Chloé Graftiaux (23), rock climber
- 28 August - Daniel Ducarme (56), former Minister-President of the Brussels Capital-Region
- 16 September - Berni Collas (56), member of the Belgian Senate
- 20 September - Fud Leclerc (86), singer
- 14 October - Alain Le Bussy (63), science fiction author
- 1 November - Gaston Vandermeerssche (89), Belgian partisan (subject of Gaston's War)
- 4 November - Antoine Duquesne (69), politician
- 9 November - Herman Liebaers (91), linguist
- 13 November - Richard Van Genechten (80), cyclist
- 10 December - Jacques Swaters (84), racing driver
- 19 December - Lucien Mathys (86), cyclist.
- 31 December - Raymond Impanis (85), cyclist

== See also ==
- 2010 in Belgian television
