= 1962 in Belgian television =

This is a list of Belgian television related events from 1962.

== Events ==
- 19 January – Fud Leclerc is selected to represent Belgium at the 1962 Eurovision Song Contest with his song "Ton nom". He is selected to be the seventh Belgian Eurovision entry during Eurosong.
- 18 March – France wins the Eurovision Song Contest with the song "Un premier amour" by Isabelle Aubret. Belgium finishes in joint thirteenth place with Fud Leclerc's song "Tom nom".

== Births ==
- 7 December – Piet Huysentruyt, TV chef
