= 2009 in Belgium =

- Decades: 1980s; 1990s; 2000s; 2010s; 2020s
- See also: Other events of 2009; List of years in Belgium

Events in the year 2009 in Belgium.

== Incumbents ==
- Monarch: Albert II
- Prime Minister: Herman Van Rompuy to 15 November; from 25 November Yves Leterme

== Events ==
January

- 4 January – Johan Bonny consecrated as bishop of Antwerp.
- 23 January – Dendermonde nursery attack

February

- 11 February – With 5,000 present, the Fortis shareholders' meeting to vote on the break-up and sale of the company to the Dutch and Belgian governments was the largest shareholders' meeting in Belgian history.
- 26 February – Franco-Belgian bank Dexia announces 3.3 billion euros of net losses for 2008.

March

- 4 March – Association belge des familles des disparus (founded 1948) wound up.

October

- 11 October – Father Damien canonised by Pope Benedict XVI, in the presence of King Albert II, Queen Paola, and Herman Van Rompuy.

November

- 15 November – Herman Van Rompuy resigns as Prime Minister in order to become President of the European Council; Van Rompuy Government ends.
- 25 November – Leterme II Government sworn in.

== Deaths ==
- 4 January - Lei Clijsters (52), footballer, father of Kim Clijsters.
- 2 February - Louis Proost (73), cyclist.
- 4 March - Patricia De Martelaere (51), writer.
- 18 March – Rita Lejeune (102), medievalist
- 6 March - Henri Pousseur (79), composer.

== See also ==
- 2009 in Belgian television
