= Geybels =

Geybels is a surname. Notable people with the surname include:

- Félix Geybels (1935–2013), Belgian footballer
- Kim Geybels (born 1981), Belgian politician
