= 2012 in Belgian television =

This is a list of Belgian television related events from 2012.

== Events ==
- 17 March – Glenn Claes wins the first season of The Voice van Vlaanderen.
- 2 November – 11-year-old singer Karolien Goris wins the first season of Belgium's Got Talent.

== Debuts ==
- 31 August – Belgium's Got Talent (2012–present)

== Television shows ==
=== 1990s ===
- Samson en Gert (1990–present)
- Familie (1991–present)
- Thuis (1995–present)

=== 2000s ===
- Mega Mindy (2006–present)
- Sterren op de Dansvloer (2006–2013)

=== 2010s ===
- ROX (2011–present)
- The Voice van Vlaanderen (2011–present)

== Networks and services ==
=== Launches ===
Network	Type	Launch date	Notes	Source
Qmusic TV	Cable and satellite	20 February		
OP12	Cable and satellite	14 May		

== See also ==
- 2012 in Belgium
