= 2008 in Belgium =

- Decades: 1980s; 1990s; 2000s; 2010s; 2020s
- See also: Other events of 2008; List of years in Belgium

The following lists events that happened during 2008 in the Kingdom of Belgium.

== Incumbents ==
- Monarch: Albert II
- Prime Minister:
  - until 20 March: Guy Verhofstadt
  - 20 March-30 December: Yves Leterme
  - starting 30 December: Herman Van Rompuy

== Events ==
=== March ===
- March 2 - Bruno Valkeniers is chosen as party chairman of political party Vlaams Belang with 94.6% of the vote.
- March 20 - Leterme I Government sworn in after 9 months of negotiations.

=== April ===
- April 12 - Standard Liège beat Anderlecht 2–0 at home and win the First Division.

=== May ===
- May 8 - Club Brugge player François Sterchele dies in a car crash.

=== September ===
- September 22 - Political parties CD&V and N-VA end their collaboration. Geert Bourgeois resigns from the Flemish government.

=== October ===
- October 5 - Rik Ceulemans is the first Belgian to win the Marathon of Brussels in 2:19.29.

=== December ===
- December 22 - Albert II accepts Yves Leterme's resignation as Prime Minister
- December 28 - During a Taizé Community meeting in Brussels, 40,000 youths from across Europe come together to profess their faith.
- December 30 - Van Rompuy Government sworn in

=== Full date unknown ===
- Center for European Democracy Studies is established in Brussels.

== Births ==
- April 16 – Princess Eléonore of Belgium, second daughter and fourth child of King Philippe of Belgium and Queen Mathilde of Belgium.

== Deaths ==
- 27 March – Robert Demoulin (born 1911), historian
- 25 August – Paul Schruers (born 1929), bishop of Hasselt

== See also ==
- 2008 in Belgian television
