= 1961 in Belgian television =

This is a list of Belgian television related events from 1961.

== Events ==
- 29 January - Bob Benny is selected to represent Belgium at the 1961 Eurovision Song Contest with his song "September, gouden roos". He was selected to be the sixth Belgian Eurovision entry during Eurosong.

== Debuts ==
- The Smurfs (1961 TV series)
- Het Manneke (The Little Fellow)
