= 1958 in Belgian television =

This is a list of Belgian television related events from 1958.

== Events ==
- April to October – The 1958 Brussels World's Fair is the largest media event of the early years of television in Belgium, as a daily Rendezvous der naties (Meetings of the Nations) is broadcast live.

== Births ==
- 8 December - Greet Rouffaer, actress
