= 1959 in Belgian television =

This is a list of Belgian television related events from 1959.

== Events ==
- 15 February - Bob Benny is selected to represent Belgium at the 1959 Eurovision Song Contest with his song "Hou toch van mij". He is selected to be the fourth Belgian Eurovision entry during Eurosong.
- The wedding of Prince Albert of Belgium to Paola is a significant media event.

== Television shows ==
- La Planète fauve (The tawny planet), a fictional short directed by André Delvaux, is made for RTB.

== Births ==
- 23 February - Lucas Van den Eynde, actor
- 30 November - Bart Peeters, singer, drummer, guitarist, actor & TV host
- 16 December - Michel Follet, TV & radio host
