= Hopla =

Flemish animated preschool television series

- Title card
- Genre: Educational; Preschool
- Created by: Bert Smets
- Country of origin: Belgium
- Original language: Dutch (no dialogue in the series)
- No. of seasons: 4
- No. of episodes: 198

Production
- Running time: 5 minutes

Original release
- Network: Ketnet
- Release: 2 April 2000 – 3 September 2008

Related
- Tik Tak

Hopla is a Belgian animated children's television series created by Bert Smets and produced by Bert Smets Productions. The cartoon features the rabbit Hopla and his friends―the pig Onki, the bear Nina, and the kitten Lola. Similar to its spiritual predecessor Tik Tak, the series is aimed at babies, toddlers, and preschoolers between 0–2 years old and has no dialogue (the only dialogue is the show's name). The show was animated with Strata 3D.

The show first aired on Ketnet, a Flemish television channel on 2 April 2000, and became popular soon afterward. Hopla has been aired in 31 countries (including Belgium, Canada, Finland, France, Spain, Israel, Italy, Japan, Poland, Portugal, South Korea, Turkey, United Kingdom, and the United States).

In Belgium, Hopla's home entertainment titles have sold over 300,000 copies and their book-related merchandise has garnered sales close to 700,000. In Portugal, the show aired on public channel RTP2, with some dialogue added to briefly describe each scene's contents.

== Characters ==
- Hopla, a white rabbit, he wears a blue shirt with two red buttons, yellow pants, and red shoes.
- Onki, a pink pig, he wears a yellow shirt with red cashmere open cardigan with pocket, blue pants, and yellow shoes.
- Nina, a brown bear, she wears a blue dress with three red buttons and red shoes.
- Lola, an orange kitten, she wears a green dress with two blue flower with yellow pistil buttons and blue shoes.

== Broadcast ==
Hopla airs in the United States due to an exclusive multi-year distribution deal between Bert Smets Productions and NCircle Entertainment, a subsidiary of Alliance Entertainment LLC. signed in 2007. In December 2007, the series was aired on BabyFirst.
