= 2012 in Belgium =

- Decades: 1990s; 2000s; 2010s; 2020s
- See also: Other events of 2012; List of years in Belgium

Events in the year 2012 in Belgium.

== Incumbents ==
- Monarch: Albert II
- Prime Minister: Elio Di Rupo

== Events ==
February

- 3 to 4 February – The traffic record is broken in Belgium due to excessive snowfall, 1,275 kilometres of traffic.

March

- 13 March – Sierre coach crash: a bus with Belgian and Dutch schoolchildren crashes in a tunnel near Sierre, Switzerland, killing 28 and injuring 24.
- 16 March – National day of mourning for the victims of the Sierre coach crash.

June

- 7 June – King Albert II of Belgium opens the 25N railway line.

September

- 17 September – Flemish commercial TV channel VT4 relaunched as VIER.

October

- 14 October – Provincial and municipal elections take place.
- 24 October – Announcement that Ford Genk would close at the end of 2013 or the beginning of 2014, leaving 4,300 unemployed.
- 27 October – Five Belgians die in a bus accident in Kerak, Jordan.

December

- 9 December – The Benelux train serving Amsterdam and Brussels is replaced by the Fyra high speed train.

== Sports ==
- 24 March – The team K.S.C. Lokeren Oost-Vlaanderen wins the 2011–12 Belgian Cup.
- 6 May – Anderlecht win the Belgian Pro League after a home draw against Club Brugge.
- 2 September – Jenson Button wins the 2012 Belgian Grand Prix at Circuit de Spa-Francorchamps.
- 7 October – Joseph Mutai wins the Brussels Marathon in 2:16.41.
- 25–27 August – Ellen van Dijk wins 2012 Lotto-Decca Tour

== Deaths ==
- 22 January - Rita Gorr (born 1926), operatic mezzo-soprano
- 5 May – Jacques Stiennon (born 1920), historian
- 12 May - Eddy Paape (born 1920), comics artist
- 15 May - Dominique Rolin (born 1913), novelist
- 24 May - Jacqueline Harpman (born 1929), Francophone writer and psychoanalyst
- 5 July - Rob Goris (born 1982), professional road racing cyclist
- 5 August - Michel Daerden (born 1949), politician and finance auditor
- 16 August - Martine Franck (born 1938), documentary and portrait photographer
- 19 August - Maïté Nahyr (born 1947), actress
- 21 August - Guy Spitaels (born 1931), politician
- 1 September - Françoise Collin (born 1928), novelist, philosopher and feminist
- 21 September - Henry Bauchau (born 1913), political activist and psychoanalyst
- 6 October - Raoul De Keyser (born 1930), painter
- 7 October - Ivo Michiels (born 1923), writer
- 10 October - Jos Huysmans (born 1941), professional road bicycle racer
- 12 October - Jean-Pierre Hautier (born 1955), television presenter and broadcaster
- 23 October - Jozef Mannaerts (born 1923), footballer
- 6 November - Charles Delporte (born 1928), painter and sculptor
- 11 November - Victor Mees (born 1927), footballer
- 17 November - Armand Desmet (born 1931), professional road bicycle racer
- 7 December - Denis Houf (born 1932), footballer
- 19 December - Georges Jobé (born 1961), professional motocross racer
- 24 December – Xavier Mabille (born 1933), historian and political scientist

== See also ==
- 2012 in Belgian television
