= 1960 in Belgian television =

This is a list of Belgian television related events from 1960.

== Events ==
- 24 January - Fud Leclerc is selected to represent Belgium at the 1960 Eurovision Song Contest with his song "Mon amour pour toi". He is selected to be the fifth Belgian Eurovision entry during Eurosong held at the INR Studios in Brussels.
- May – By national (federal) law, NIR/INR is changed into BRT and RTB.
- The Wedding of Baudouin of Belgium and Fabiola de Mora y Aragón is a major media event.

== Networks and services ==
=== Conversions and rebrandings ===
Old network name	New network name	Type	Conversion Date	Notes	Source
INR	RTB	Cable and satellite	Unknown		

== Births ==
- 2 August - Bart Kaëll, singer & TV host
