= 1963 in Belgian television =

This is a list of Belgian television related events from 1963.

== Events ==
- 16 February - Jacques Raymond is selected to represent Belgium at the 1963 Eurovision Song Contest with his song "Waarom?". He is selected to be the eighth Belgian Eurovision entry during Eurosong.
- Mobile cameras on motorbikes and a helicopter are used to broadcast images from the 1963 Tour of Flanders.

== Births ==
- 21 January - Goedele Liekens, psychologist & TV host
- 18 February - Marlène de Wouters, journalist, TV host & author
- 9 May - Guy Van Sande, actor
