= 2010 in Belgian television =

This is a list of Belgian television related events from 2010.

== Events ==
- 28 May - Mega Mindy actor Louis Talpe and his partner Leila Akcelik win the fourth season of Sterren op de Dansvloer.

== Debuts ==
=== New International Programming ===
- 13 November - (United States) Lipstick Jungle (VIJFtv)

== Television shows ==
=== 1990s ===
- Samson en Gert (1990–present)
- Familie (1991–present)
- Thuis (1995–present)

=== 2000s ===
- Idool (2003-2011)
- Mega Mindy (2006–present)
- Sterren op de Dansvloer (2006–2013)

== Networks and services ==
=== Launches ===
Network	Type	Launch date	Notes	Source
Playhouse Disney	Cable and satellite	22 June		

== See also ==
- 2010 in Belgium
