= 2011 in Belgium =

- Decades: 1990s; 2000s; 2010s; 2020s
- See also: Other events of 2011; List of years in Belgium

Events in the year 2011 in Belgium.

== Incumbents ==
- Monarch: Albert II
- Prime Minister: Yves Leterme (until 6 December), Elio Di Rupo (starting 6 December)

== Events ==
- January 18 – Quiz channels are removed from Flemish television after an exposé by TV programme Basta.
- February 2 – Didier Reynders appointed lead negotiator in ongoing attempts to form a governing coalition
- February 26 – Flemish sitcom F.C. De Kampioenen stops after 21 seasons.
- April 5 – 101 Air Unit, a documentary mini-series is first broadcast.
- May 17 – KRC Genk win the Belgian Pro League after a home draw against Standard Liège.
- June 1 – Belgium breaks the world record for length of time taken to form a government.
- July 4 – Jagers te Paard Battalion formed.
- August 18 – The 26th edition of music festival Pukkelpop is canceled after heavy weather leaves 5 people dead and 140 wounded.
- August 28 – Sebastian Vettel wins the Belgian Grand Prix.
- September 16 – Finals of the 2011 IAAF Diamond League held in Memorial Van Damme stadium, Brussels
- October 2 – Paul Kiprop of Kenya wins the Brussels Marathon in 2:14.51.
- October 4 – Together with France and Luxembourg, Belgium saves bank and insurance company Dexia
- December 6 – The leader of the Socialist Party, Elio Di Rupo, becomes Prime Minister of the newly formed Di Rupo I Government.
- December 12 – A Pakistani family is convicted and sentenced in the honor killing of Sadia Sheikh. The case has been called Belgium's first honor killing trial.
- December 13 – 2011 Liège attack: Nordine Amrani kills 5 people and injures 125 others in a shooting and grenade attack in Liège before killing himself.

== Art ==
Film

- Empire of Dust (documentary)

== Deaths ==
- January 2 – Émile Masson Jr. (born 1915), Belgian professional road bicycle racer
- January 18 – Marcel Marlier (born 1930), Belgian artist and illustrator
- February 8 – Marie-Rose Morel (born 1972), Flemish-Belgian politician
- March 9 – Jacques Brichant (born 1930), Belgian tennis player
- April 11 – La Esterella (Ester Lambrechts) (born 1919), Belgian singer
- May 3 – Robert Brout (born 1928), American-born Belgian theoretical physicist
- May 9 – Wouter Weylandt (born 1984), Belgian professional cyclist
- June 5 – Ludo Martens (born 1946), Belgian historian and far-left activist
- June 27 – Thierry Martens (born 1942), Belgian author
- July 2 – Marcel Hastir (born 1906), Belgian artist, theosophist and Resistance member
- July 3 – Len Sassaman (born 1980), American technologist and information privacy advocate
- July 24 – Jan de Vos van Gerven (born 1936), Belgian historian
- July 29 – Claude Laydu (born 1927), Belgian-born Swiss actor
- August 4 – Erika Thijs (born 1960), Flemish politician
- October 11 – Dieudonné Kabongo (born 1950), Congolese-born Belgian comedian, humorist, musician, and actor
- October 28 – Willy De Clercq (born 1927), Belgian liberal politician
- November 4 – Emmanuel de Bethune (born 1930), Belgian politician
- November 12 – Hubert Nyssen (born 1925), Belgian-French writer and publisher
- November 13 – Bobsam Elejiko (born 1981), Nigerian footballer
- December 1 – Hippolyte Van den Bosch (born 1926), Belgian footballer
- December 20 – Leopold Unger (born 1922), journalist, columnist, and essayist

== See also ==
- 2011 in Belgian television
