= 1956 in Belgian television =

This article is a list of Belgian television related events from 1956.

== Events ==
- A group of Belgian journalists including Henri-Francois Van Aal develop the concept of a Belgian television news bulletin.
- April – The Wedding of Rainier III, Prince of Monaco, and Grace Kelly is a major media event.
- 24 May - Belgium enters the Eurovision Song Contest for the first time with "Messieurs les noyés de la Seine", performed by Fud Leclerc and "Le Plus Beau Jour de ma vie", performed by Mony Marc.

== Births ==
- 26 March - Gene Bervoets, actor & TV host
