= 2008 in Belgian television =

This is a list of Belgian television related events from 2008.

== Events ==
- 9 March - Ishtar are selected to represent Belgium at the 2008 Eurovision Song Contest with their song "O Julissi". They are selected to be the fiftieth Belgian Eurovision entry during Eurosong held at the VRT Studios in Schelle.
- 4 June - Sara actor Antony Arandia and his partner Leila Akcelik win the third season of Sterren op de Dansvloer.
- 17 December - Dirk De Smet wins the second and final season of X Factor.

== Television shows ==
=== 1990s ===
- Samson en Gert (1990–present)
- Familie (1991–present)
- Thuis (1995–present)

=== 2000s ===
- Idool (2003-2011)
- Mega Mindy (2006–present)
- Sterren op de Dansvloer (2006–2013)

== Ending this year ==
- Wittekerke (1993-2008)
- X Factor (2005-2008)

== Networks and services ==
=== Conversions and rebrandings ===
Old network name	New network name	Type	Conversion Date	Notes	Source
KAANALTWEE	2BE	Cable and satellite	Unknown		

== See also ==
- 2008 in Belgium
