= Albert Houssiau =

Belgian prelate of the Catholic Church (1924–2026)

The Most Reverend Albert Houssiau
- Bishop of Liège
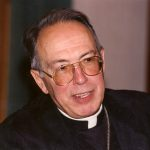
- Archdiocese: Mechelen–Brussels
- Diocese: Liège
- Installed: 17 March 1986
- Term ended: 9 May 2001
- Predecessor: Guillaume Marie van Zuylen
- Successor: Aloys Jousten

Orders
- Ordination: 6 February 1949 by Jozef-Ernest van Roey
- Consecration: 18 May 1986 by Godfried Danneels

Personal details
- Born: 2 November 1924 Halle, Belgium
- Died: 13 October 2026 (aged 101) Liège, Belgium
- Denomination: Roman Catholic
- Coat of arms

Albert Jean Charles Ghislain Houssiau (2 November 1924 – 13 October 2026) was a Belgian prelate of the Catholic Church. He served as bishop of Liège from 1986 to 2001.

Houssiau was born in Halle on 2 November 1924. He was ordained a priest on 6 February 1949. Houssiau was appointed bishop of Liège on 17 March 1986 by Pope John Paul II, and was consecrated on 18 May 1986 by Cardinal Godfried Danneels. He held the post until his retirement on 9 May 2001.

Houssiau died in Liège on 13 October 2026, at the age of 101.

Catholic Church titles
Preceded by Guillaume Marie van Zuylen	Bishop of Liège; 17 March 1986 – 9 May 2001	Succeeded by Aloys Jousten
