= 2013 in Belgian television =

This is a list of Belgian television related events from 2013.

== Events ==
- 11 January - Figure skater Kevin van der Perren and his partner Charissa van Dipte win the fifth and final season of Sterren op de Dansvloer.
- 3 May - Paulien Mathues wins the second season of The Voice van Vlaanderen.
- 21 December - 34-year-old singer Michael Lanzo wins the second season of Belgium's Got Talent.

== Television shows ==
=== 1990s ===
- Samson en Gert (1990–present)
- Familie (1991–present)
- Thuis (1995–present)

=== 2000s ===
- Mega Mindy (2006–present)

=== 2010s ===
- ROX (2011–present)
- The Voice van Vlaanderen (2011–present)
- Belgium's Got Talent (2012–present)
- Let's Get Fit (2013)

== Ending this year ==
- Sterren op de Dansvloer (2006–2013)

== See also ==
- 2013 in Belgium
