= Diocese of Liège =

Catholic ecclesiastical territory in Belgium

Diocese of Liège Dioecesis Leodiensis Diocèse de Liège (French) Bistum Lüttich (German) Bisdom Luik (Dutch)

Catholic
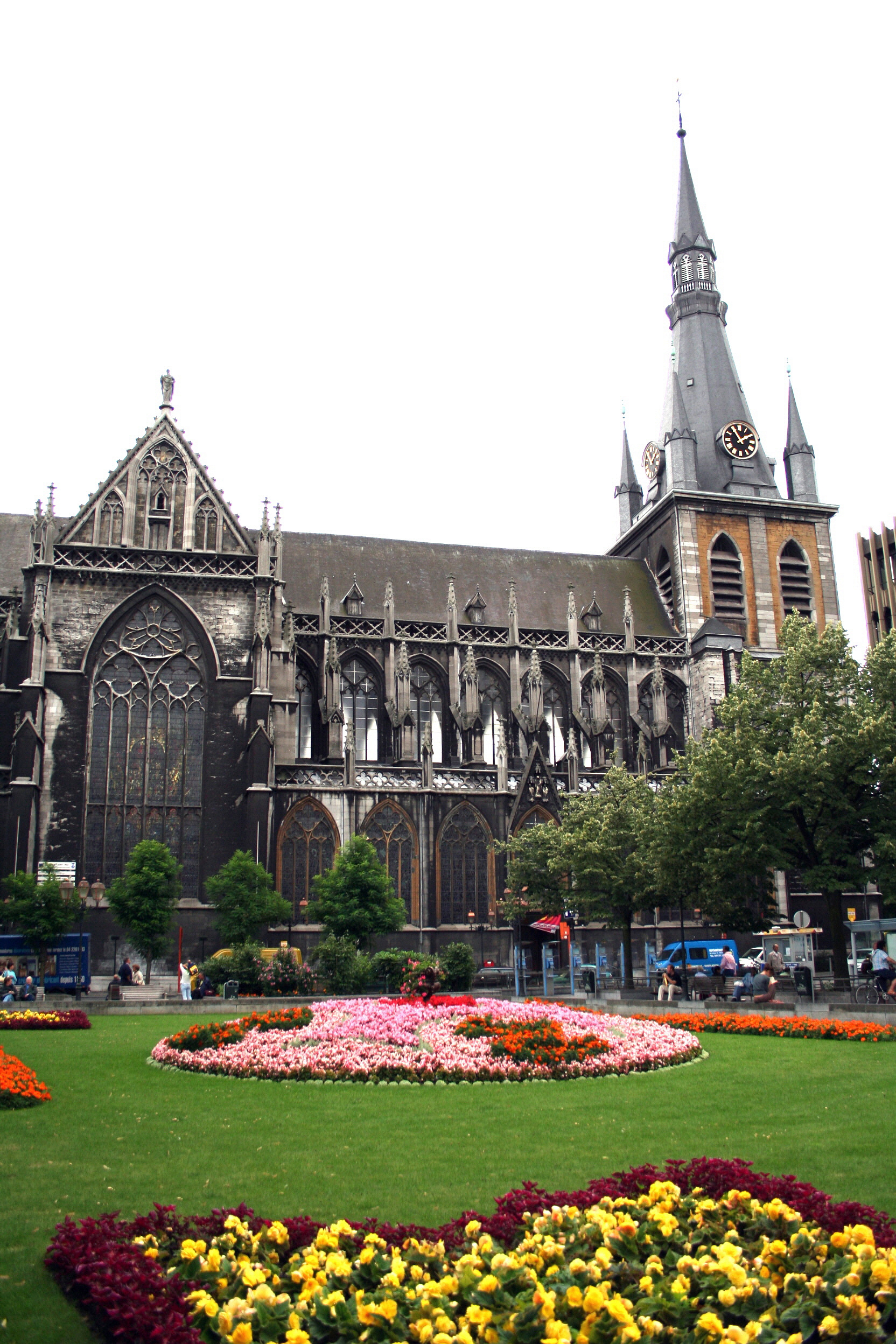
- St. Paul's Cathedral in Liège

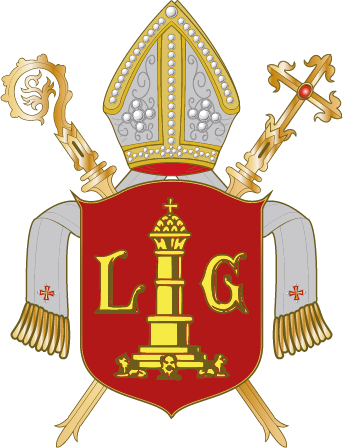
- Coat of arms

Location
- Country: Belgium
- Ecclesiastical province: Mechelen-Brussels
- Metropolitan: Archdiocese of Mechelen-Brussels
- Coordinates: 50°38′15″N 5°34′20″E

Statistics
- Area: 3,862 km^{2} (1,491 sq mi)
- Population: Total; Catholics: (as of 2016); 1,092,226; 731,000 (66.9%)

Information
- Denomination: Catholic Church
- Sui iuris church: Latin Church
- Rite: Roman Rite
- Cathedral: St. Paul's Cathedral in Liège

Current leadership
- Pope: Leo XIV
- Bishop: Jean-Pierre Delville
- Metropolitan Archbishop: Jozef De Kesel

Map
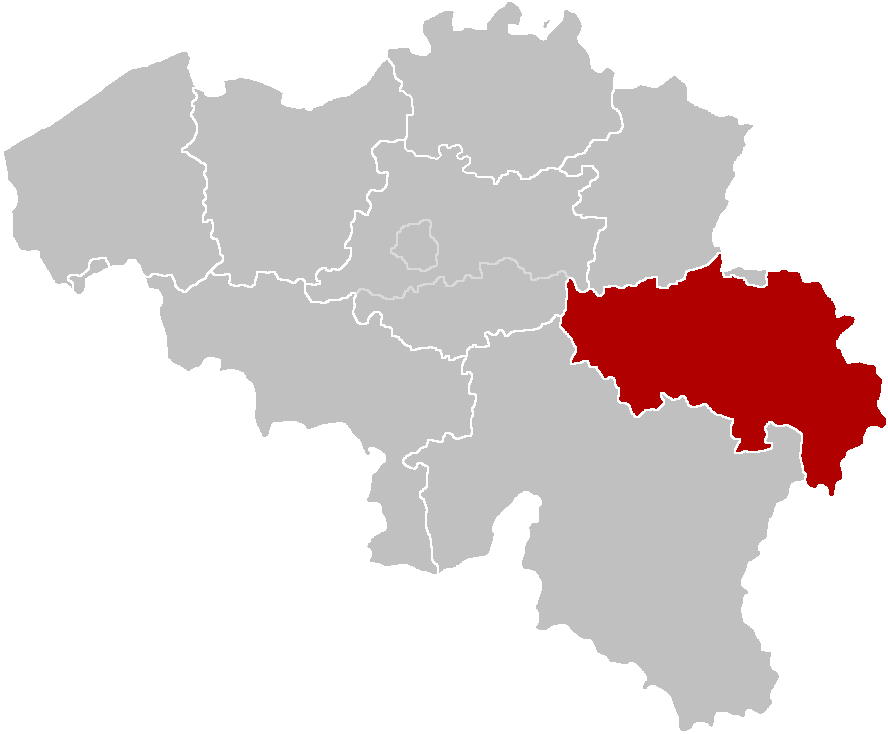
- The Diocese of Liège, coextensive with the Liège Province

Website
- Website of the Diocese

The Diocese of Liège (Latin: Dioecesis Leodiensis) is a Latin Church ecclesiastical territory or diocese of the Catholic Church in Belgium. The diocese was erected in the 4th century and presently covers the same territory as Belgium's Liège Province, but it was historically much larger. Currently, the diocese is a suffragan in the ecclesiastical province of the Archdiocese of Mechelen-Brussels. Its cathedra is found within St. Paul's Cathedral in the episcopal see of Liège.

== Origins of the diocese ==
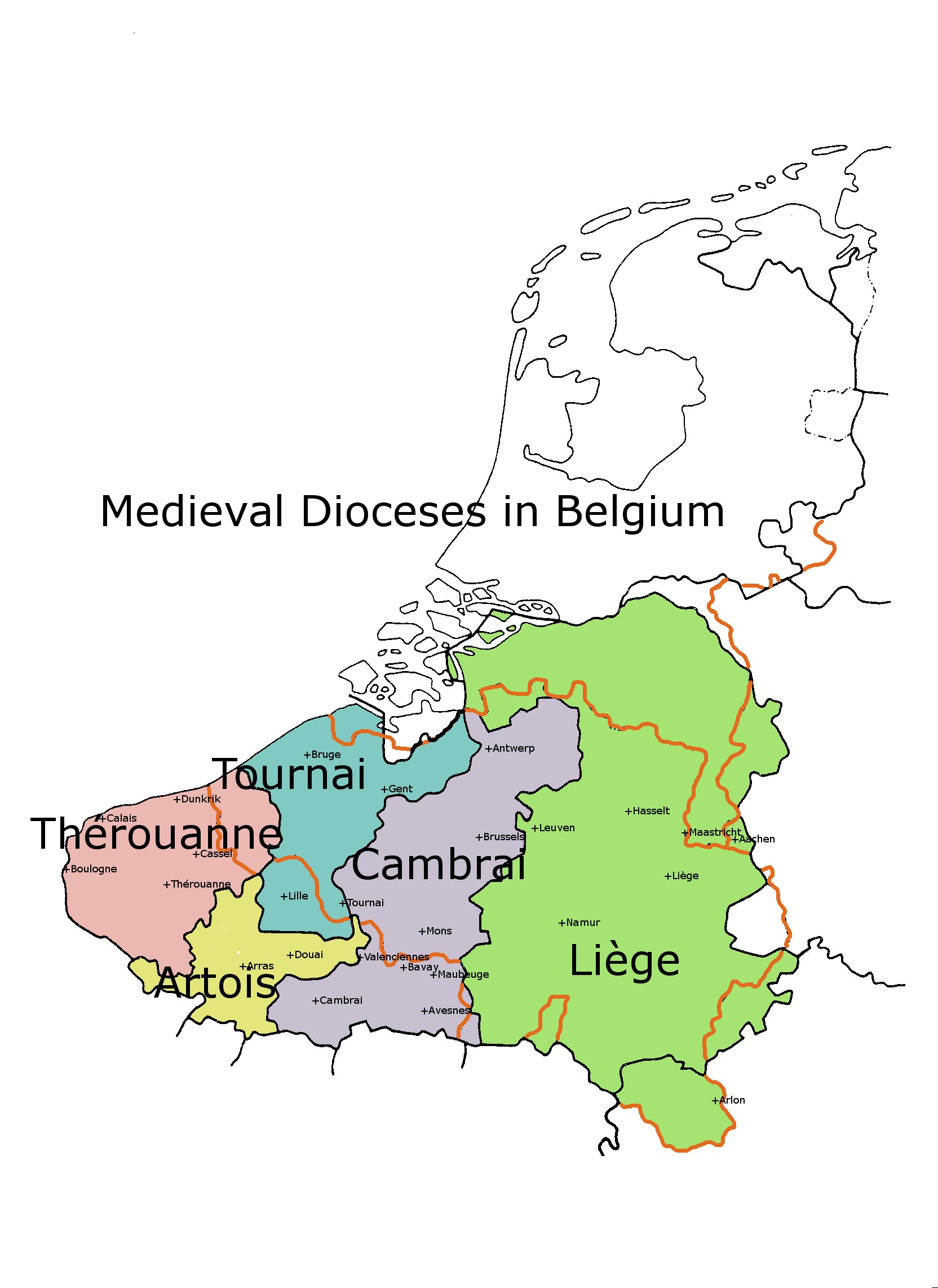
This map shows the pre-1559 medieval Diocese of Liège (in green) which evolved from the Civitas Tungrorum and probably had similar boundaries.

The original diocese was the church equivalent of the Civitas Tungrorum, the capital of which was Tongeren, northwest of Liège, and its borders were probably approximately the same.

The bishopric of Tongeren originally formed part of the dioceses of Trier and Cologne. After the first half of the fourth century, the bishopric of Tongeren received autonomous organization. In late antiquity, the centre of administration and religion in the area moved first to Maastricht, and then to Liège.

The boundaries were formed, to the North, by the diocese of Utrecht; to the East, Cologne; to the South, the dioceses of Trier and Reims; to the West, that of Cambrai. Thus the diocese of Tongeren extended from France, in the neighbourhood of Chimay, to Stavelot, Aachen, Gladbach, and Venlo, and from the banks of the Semois as far as Ekeren, near Antwerp, to the middle of the Isle of Tholen and beyond Moerdijk, so that it included both Romance and Germanic populations. The boundaries remained virtually unchanged until 1559.

Legend has it that the first bishop of Tongeren was Saint Maternus. This may refer to the legendary founder of the Archbishopric of Cologne, Maternus I, or Saint Maternus (Maternus II), who was also bishop of Cologne. Saint Servatius was the first confirmed bishop of Tongeren-Maastricht-Liège, who was referred to in documents as bishop of the Tungri. He died around 384 and was buried outside the Roman castrum in Maastricht. One of his successors, probably in the 6th century, moved the see of the bishopric to Maastricht. The conversion of the Franks continued under Falco (around 500 AD) and continued under Saint Domitian, Saint Monulphus and Saint Gondulphus (6th/7th centuries). Monulphus built a church over the grave of Saint Servatius in Maastricht, which later became the Basilica of Saint Servatius. During the whole of the seventh century the bishops had to struggle against paganism and opposition. St Amandus (647–650) and St Remaclus (650–660) even abandoned the episcopal see in discouragement. Both built several monasteries. St Theodard (660–669) died a martyr.

St Lambert (669–700) completed the conversion of the pagans in the Ardennes region. He was murdered at Liège around 705. Lambert was regarded as a martyr for his defence of church property against the avarice of the neighbouring lords. His successor, St Hubert of Liège, transferred the body of St Lambert to Liège, which was then a small settlement, a vicus, named Vicus Leudicus. On his grave Hubert built a chapel (St. Lambert's Cathedral) which became the nucleus of the city, and near which the permanent residence of the bishops was established.

Agilfrid (765–787) and Gerbald (787–810) were both appointed by Charlemagne. Hartgar built the first episcopal palace. Bishop Franco, who defeated the Normans, is celebrated by the Irish poet Sedulius Scottus. Stephen (908–920), Richaire (920–945), Hugh (945–947), Farabert (947–958) and Rathier were promoted from the cloister school. To Stephen, a writer and composer, the Catholic Church is indebted for the feast and the Office of the Blessed Trinity. Ratherius absorbed all the learning of his time. Heraclius, who occupied the see in 959, built four new parish churches, a monastery, and two collegiate churches, he inaugurated in his diocese an era of great artistic activity known as Mosan art.

All these bishops, until the end of the Middle Ages, continued to call themselves bishops of the church of Tongeren, or sometimes bishops of Tongeren-Maastricht or Tongeren-Liège, Tongeren in this case referring to the old civitas of Tongeren, rather than the town.

== Modern History ==
The original dioceses of the region underwent some adaptations under Habsburg influence in 1559, and then survived further until suppression under the Revolution, and confirmed in 1801 by a Concordat co-signed by Napoléon Bonaparte and Pope Pius VII. The new diocese, erected 10 April 1802, included the two départements of Ourte and Meuse-Inférieure, with certain parishes of the département des Forêts (without, among other areas formerly belonging to the diocese, the city of Aix-la-Chapelle, which had before belonged to the diocese but now became episcopal see itself, later merged with Cologne but still later restored). In 1818, it lost a certain number of cantons, ceded to Prussia.

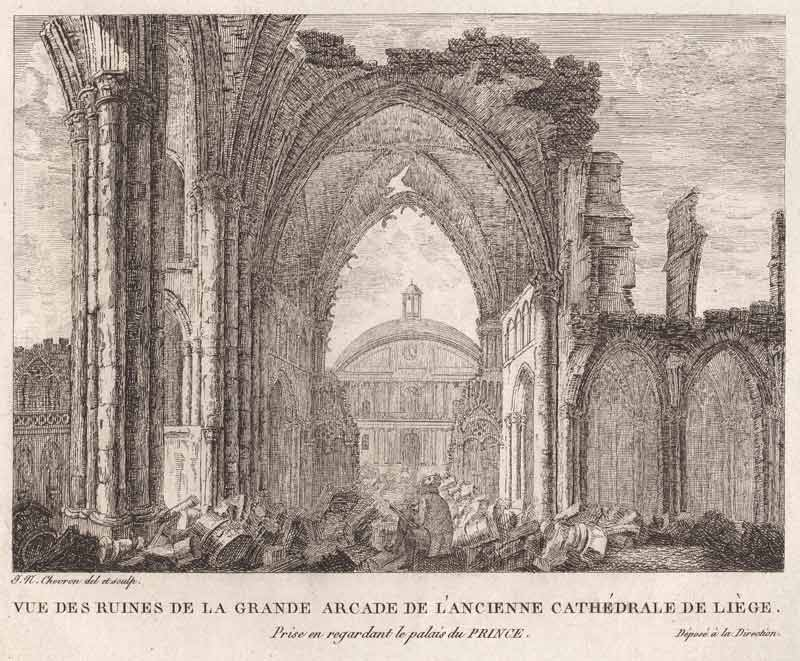
The Saint Lambertus cathedral during its destruction.

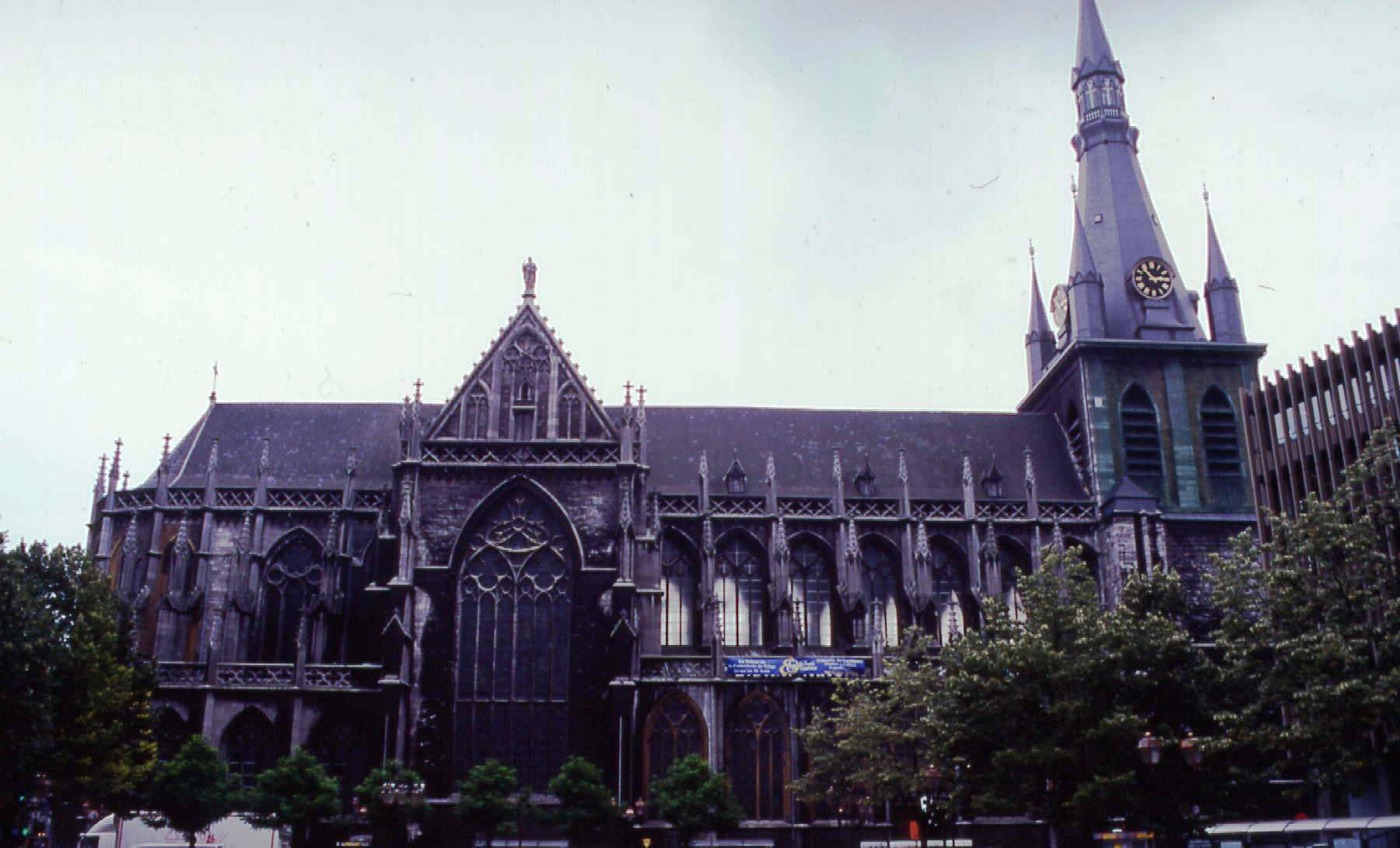
The Saint Paul Cathedral in Liège has been the bishopric's cathedral since 1801

After the establishment of the United Kingdom of the Netherlands the two provinces of this diocese were renamed as Liège Province and Limburg Province. On 6 May 1838, Mgr Van Bommel divided Liège Province into two deaneries. In 1839, the diocese lost those parishes (including Maastricht) which were situated in Dutch Limburg, which was no longer part of Belgium; this territory was attached to the Diocese of Roermond. In 1967, the Dutch-speaking parishes of the diocese (including Tongeren) formed the newly erected Diocese of Hasselt, corresponding to Belgian Limburg. From that point, the present territory of the diocese has coincided with Liège Province. The present Diocese of Liège, suffragan to the Archdiocese of Mechlin–Brussels, consists of 525 parishes with 543 priests and has a population of 1,023,506 (as of 2003), the majority (Walloons) speaking French; the minority speaking German in the Eupen-Malmedy area, part of Germany until the fallout after World War I.

== Ordinaries ==
- Érard de La Marck † (25 Feb 1506 Appointed – 28 Mar 1520 Appointed, Archbishop of Valencia)
- George of Austria † (16 Aug 1544 Succeeded – 4 May 1557 Died)
- Ernest of Bavaria † (30 Jan 1581 Appointed – 17 Feb 1612 Died)
- Ferdinand of Bavaria † (17 Feb 1612 Succeeded – 13 Sep 1650 Died)
- Maximilian Henry of Bavaria † (13 Sep 1650 Succeeded – 3 Jun 1688 Died)
- Jean Louis d'Elderen † (17 Aug 1688 Appointed – 1 Feb 1694 Died)
- Joseph Clemens of Bavaria † (4 Apr 1694 Appointed – 11 Dec 1723 Died)
- Georges-Louis de Berghes † (7 Feb 1724 Appointed – 5 Dec 1743 Died)
- Johann Theodor of Bavaria † (23 Jan 1744 Appointed – 27 Jan 1763 Died)
- Charles-Nicolas d'Oultremont † (20 Apr 1763 Appointed – 22 Oct 1771 Died)
- François-Charles de Velbrück † (16 Jan 1772 Appointed – 30 Apr 1784 Died)
- César-Constantin-François de Hoensbroeck † (21 Jul 1784 Appointed – 4 Jun 1792 Died)
- François Antoine Marie Constantin de Méan et de Beaurieux † (16 Aug 1792 Appointed – 26 Nov 1801 Resigned)
- Cornelius Richard Anton van Bommel † (15 Nov 1829 Ordained Bishop – 7 Apr 1852 Died)
- Theodor Joseph de Montpellier (1852-1879)
- Victor Joseph Douterloux (1879-1901)
- Martin-Hubert Rutten † (16 Dec 1901 Appointed – 17 Jul 1927 Died)
- Albert Houssiau (17 Mar 1986 Appointed – 9 May 2001 Retired)
- Aloys Jousten (9 May 2001 Appointed – 31 May 2013 Retired)
- Jean-Pierre Delville (31 May 2013 Appointed – )
