= Albert De Coninck =

Albert De Coninck (October 6, 1915 – December 8, 2006) was a Belgian communist. In 1932 he joined the Communist Party of Belgium. He travelled to Spain and fought in the International Brigades during the Spanish Civil War. After returning from Spain he joined the Belgian Army. During the Second World War, he led partisan resistance activities against the German occupants.

De Coninck authored Belgen in de Internationale Brigaden.
