= Philibert Mees =

Flemish composer and pianist (1929–2006)

Philibert Mees (13 May 1929, in Mechelen – 29 June 2006, in Mechelen) was a Flemish composer and pianist. He was murdered in June 2006.

In 1952, Mees obtained a degree at the Koninklijk Conservatory, the Royal conservatory of Antwerp. He studied under the pianists Stevan Bergmann and Geza Anda.

Mees formed a duo with BRT violist Roger Nauwelaers since the 1980s. In 1999, Mees received the Fuga prize, awarded by the Union of Belgian Composers.

Mees was killed in his home in Mechelen in July 2006 by two knife wounds to his chest. His body was concealed in a bed cover and plastic hidden under his bed. Two days later, police apprehended a suspect after investigation of Mees' phone records. The musician's twenty-year-old neighbour, Bilel Gheribi, a Tunisian immigrant, was sentenced for his murder in 2009.
