= 1964 in Belgian television =

This is a list of Belgian television related events from 1964.

== Births ==
- 25 October - Peter Van Den Begin, actor
- 21 December - Kris Wauters, co-host of Idool
