= Murder of Joe Van Holsbeeck =

2006 robbery-murder in Brussels-Central station, Belgium

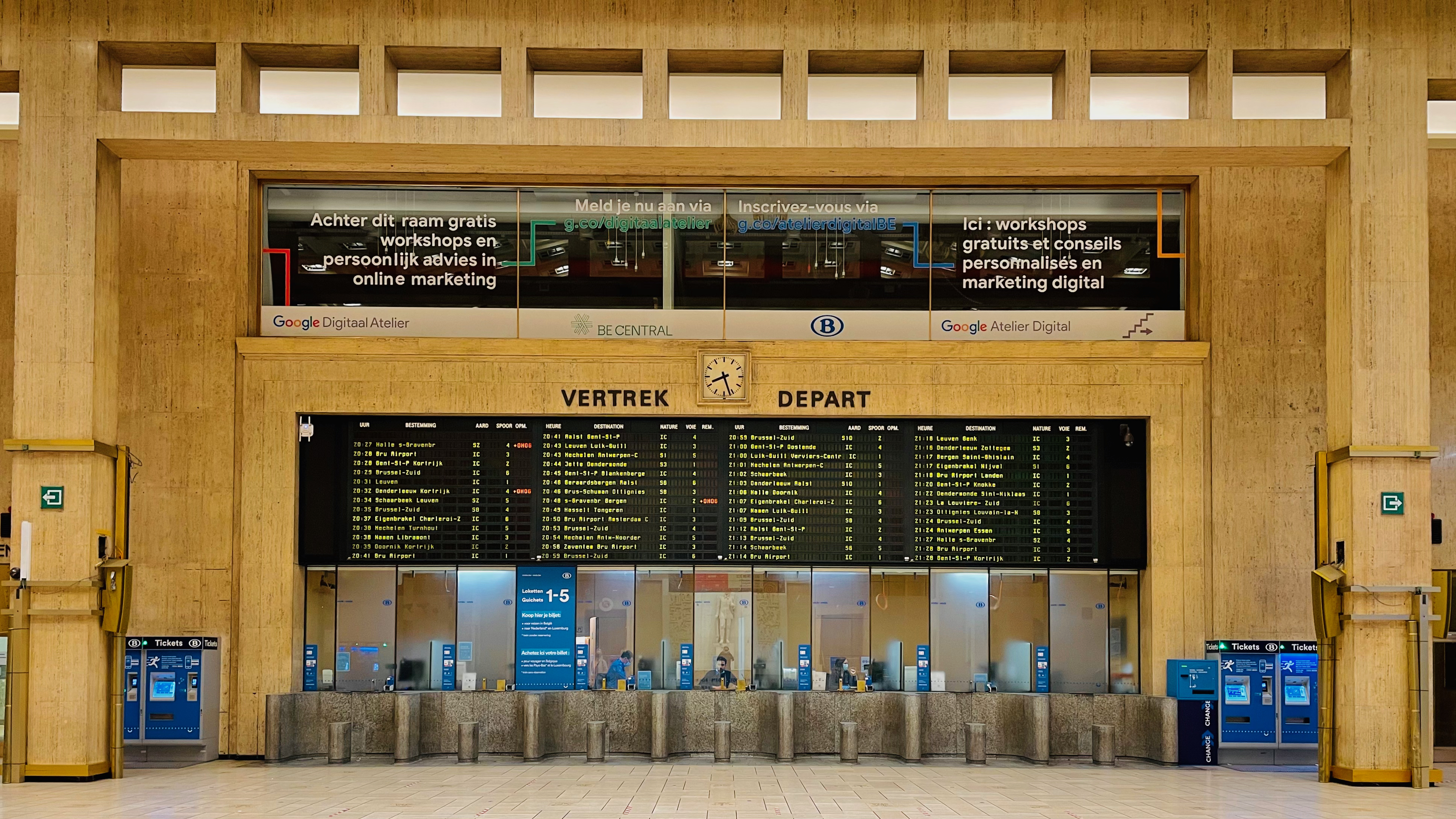
Main hall of Brussels-Central railway station, where Van Holsbeeck's murder took place

Joe Van Holsbeeck was a Belgian 17-year-old student who was murdered at Brussels-Central railway station on 12 April 2006. Van Holsbeeck was fatally stabbed in an attempted robbery of his MP3 player and died in hospital later that day. Van Holsbeeck's murder in the main hall of a crowded train station during the afternoon rush hour shocked many Belgians at the time, leading to a media frenzy over the crime and subsequent investigation. The two perpetrators, who turned out to be Romani juveniles from Poland, were later arrested.

== Murder ==
The murder took place around 16:30 (4:30 p.m.) on Wednesday 12 April 2006 in the crowded main hall of Brussels-Central railway station. Joe Van Holsbeeck, a 17-year-old Belgian high school student, and one of his friends were approached by two youths of about the same age. According to reports, the assailants at first asked for directions, but suddenly tried to take off with the victim's MP3 player. When Joe Van Holsbeeck resisted non-violently, he was stabbed seven times by one of the two. Van Holsbeeck was then taken to hospital, where he succumbed to his injuries a couple of hours later. Two suspected assailants fled the station. Initially, Belgian media erroneously reported them as being of Moroccan descent.

== Investigation ==
As the murder took place during rush hour in one of Brussels' busiest places, a major commuter train station serving the downtown core area, there were hundreds of people present at the station. However, nobody intervened to prevent the crime or to intercept the suspects. Police ultimately interviewed thousands of commuters at the Central Station over the next day in the hope of obtaining more clues as to the identity of the perpetrators.

Both suspects (plus, perhaps, the murderer's 24-year-old elder brother) had been recorded on very clear CCTV footage in front on the Central Station. One week after the murder, on 19 April, the Brussels police issued a description and a police artist's drawing (identikit) of the two principal suspects as well as some CCTV footage taken by the station's security cameras. According to news website HLN.be, this delay was due to the police not wanting to aggravate pre-existing racial tensions or cause a witch-hunt against the North African community (to which the suspects were first believed to belong), although this was not confirmed by the state prosecutor's office.

The quality of the NMBS/SNCB security cameras that taped the murder has also been a source of discussion. According to some investigators, the quality of the images was too poor to be helpful. However, Belgian authorities denied this claim. In addition, CCTV cameras filmed the two suspects at a subway station following the murder. Those pictures were of excellent quality but were not released. CCTV footage from other sources was also released. These images were of a higher quality than the previous ones and police hoped that they would generate new tips from the general public.

One of the perpetrators, a 16½-year-old from Poland, was arrested on 25 April 2006 or the day before. He was identified by his secondary school teachers. The other alleged perpetrator, also from Poland, had fled Belgium. The 17-year-old youth, the alleged murderer, was arrested in Suwałki, Poland, on 27 April. According to the VRT, both suspects were of Romani descent, which might explain why they had been thought to be of North African descent. The murderer, Adam G. was extradited in 2007. In September 2008, he was sentenced to 20 years in prison. The Belgian authorities intended to have him serve at least half of his sentence in Poland, thus ensuring that he would have to serve at the very least 10 years because Polish criminal law demands that a convicted criminal must serve at least half of his sentence. Whereas under Belgian criminal law, only one third of the sentence needs to be served.

== Reactions ==
The rarity and brutality of Van Holsbeeck's murder and the perceived long wait for any arrests produced a public outcry and reactions from a variety of public figures. Four days after the murder, Belgian Prime Minister Guy Verhofstadt contacted the family of the victim by letter, as did the Belgian royal family more than a week later.

The erroneous belief that the perpetrators were North Africans affected most of the reactions before the eventual arrest, with Fouad Ahidar, a Belgian Parliament deputy of North African ancestry, calling upon the immigrant community to help in the search for the culprits. Family members and friends of the victim specifically asked that the murder should not be used as propaganda by political parties. Many expressed concerns that the murder would increase support for the far right Vlaams Belang party.

The incident was headline news for several days in most Belgian media. The murder was also mentioned by Cardinal Danneels, the former Metropolitan Archbishop of Mechelen-Brussels, in his Easter mass.

Many Belgians took flowers to the site of the crime and an online petition was set up to commemorate Joe by having MSN users choose a flower as their screen symbol. There was also a petition on the Internet in Van Holsbeeck's memory asking for "more security in public places and transports" and to "re-establish a dialog with marginal young delinquents". A demonstration organised by immigrant organisations for 19 April had very little participation.

Joe Van Holsbeeck was buried in private on 20 April in a Catholic prayer service without a mass. According to the VRT, in order to better accommodate the many attending immigrants, the family opted for a "prayer service instead of a traditional Roman Catholic service".

A silent non-partisan march through Brussels took place on Sunday 23 April with an estimated 80,000 participants. The Belgian Muslim Executive Council (an official Islamic organisation in Belgium) refused to join the Union of Brussels Mosque Associations in calling for the perpetrators to turn themselves in. According to a spokesman, "So long as the perpetrators have not been identified, we see little use in making a statement. [...] The mere fact that the perpetrators look like Arabs does not mean that they are Muslims. Our role is to support the mourning family. [The council] will be sending a letter of condolences to Joe's parents in the coming days." According to the VRT website, an Antwerp imam said: "The people who know who the killers are, should not remain silent about it and reveal their identity".

On 23 October 2013, his name was given to a small street in Haren, Brussels.

== See also ==
- Guido Demoor
- Hans Van Themsche
- Senseless violence
