= 2009 in Belgian television =

This is a list of Belgian television related events from 2009.

== Television shows ==
=== 1990s ===
- Samson en Gert (1990–present)
- Familie (1991–present)
- Thuis (1995–present)

=== 2000s ===
- Idool (2003-2011)
- Mega Mindy (2006–present)
- Sterren op de Dansvloer (2006–2013)

== Networks and services ==
=== Launches ===
Network	Type	Launch date	Notes	Source
Acht	Cable and satellite	18 May		
VTM Kids	Cable and satellite	1 October		

== Deaths ==
Date	Name	Age	Cinematic Credibility
9 October	Dré Steemans	55	Belgian TV host
