= Hugo Raes =

Belgian author (1929–2013)

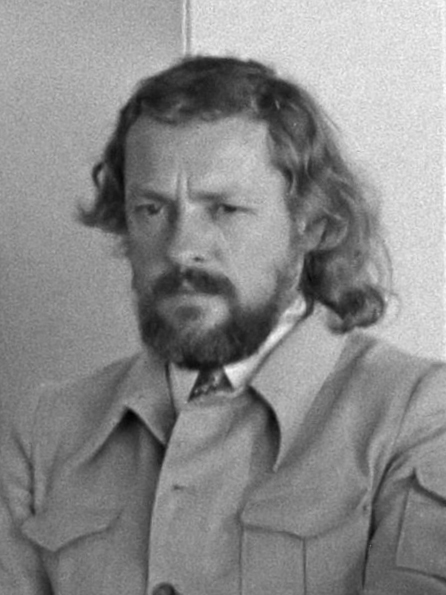
- Hugo Raes (1971)
- Born: 26 May 1929; Antwerp, Belgium
- Died: 23 September 2013 (aged 84); Antwerp, Belgium
- Occupations: poet, writer

Hugo Raes (26 May 1929 – 23 September 2013) was a Belgian writer and poet.

== Bibliography ==
- Jagen en gejaagd worden (1954)
- Afro-europees (1957)
- Links van de helikopterlijn (1957)
- De vadsige koningen (1961)
- Een tijdelijk monument (1962)
- Hemel en dier (1964)
- Een faun met kille horentjes (1966)
- Bankroet van een charmeur (1967)
- De lotgevallen (1968)
- Reizigers in de anti-tijd (1970)
- Explosie (1972)
- Het smaran (1973)
- De Vlaamse Reus (1974)
- Brandstichting tegen de tijd (1976)
- Trapezenwerk in het luchtledige (1976)
- De verwoesting van Hyperion (1978)
- Verzamelde verhalen (1979)
- Het jarenspel (1981)
- De goudwaterbron (1986)
- De Gektewind (1988)
- De strik (1988)
- De Spaanse sjaal (1989)
- Verhalen (1998)
- Een aquarel van de tijd (2001)

== See also ==
- Flemish literature

== Sources ==
- Hugo Raes
- G.J. van Bork en P.J. Verkruijsse, De Nederlandse en Vlaamse auteurs (1985)
- Fernand Auwera, Hugo Raes In: Schrijven of schieten. Interviews (1969)
