= Centre for European Democracy Studies =

Belgian think tank

The Centre for European Democracy Studies was established in Brussels in 2008 by a group of researchers studying Europe's political history and the current state of democracy in the continent. The research establishment serves as a place of regular events covering studies of the European democracy institution, key threats existing today, as well as countries on the way to democracy establishment and development in Europe.

The Centre holds conferences, workshops and other events resulting in formulation of recommendations to the European governmental authorities and public organizations aiming to strengthen the democracy and political stability fundamentals.
