= Het Manneke =

Flemish television program

- Genre: Sketch show
- Created by: Jef Cassiers
- Directed by: Herman Wuyts
- Country of origin: Belgium
- Original language: Dutch

Production
- Running time: 3 minutes

Original release
- Network: BRT (nowadays the VRT)
- Release: 1961 – 1963

Het Manneke (The Little Man) was a Flemish TV sketch show broadcast on the BRT (nowadays VRT) between 1961 and 1963.

== Concept ==
Het Manneke was a series of slapstick sketches starring Flemish comedian Jef Cassiers as the titular character. Cassiers always wore a long coat, a black hat, a long scarf and frequently carried a ladder around. Most sketches centered only around him, though his brother Cois Cassiers and Doris Van Caneghem sometimes had supporting roles. All episodes were directed by Herman Wuyts.

On the BRT the episodes were used as a bumper before their news reports started.

In 2012 the old episodes were rebroadcast on New Year's Eve, after the BRT organized a viewer's poll to find out which of their old shows ought to be rebroadcast during that special time of the year. "Het Manneken" surprisingly ended first place.

== Comic strip adaptation ==
In 1962 the character was adapted into a gag-a-day comic strip. Cassiers wrote the gags, while artist Pil (Joe Meuleplas) provided the drawings. Later Mark Payot and Paul Ausloos took over. The gags were published in Kwik and Het Laatste Nieuws and later collected in about 20 albums by publishing company Zuid-Nederlandse.
