= Berni Collas =

Belgian politician (1954–2010)

Senator
- In office 5 July 2007 – 16 September 2010

Personal details
- Born: 27 April 1954 Waimes, Belgium
- Died: 16 September 2010 (aged 56) Brussels, Belgium
- Party: Partei für Freiheit und Fortschritt
- Website: www.berni-collas.be

Bernard "Berni" Collas (27 April 1954 – 16 September 2010) was a Belgian German-speaking politician and member of the liberal Party for Freedom and Progress (German: Partei für Freiheit und Fortschritt). He was married and had three children.

Berni Collas was a member of the Parliament of the German-speaking Community from 1990 to 2003, and from 22 January 2004 till his death he was the Community Senator appointed by the Parliament of the German-speaking Community. In the Senate he served as a member of the MR fraction because the PFF is a constituent part of the MR. He was re-appointed as the German-speaking Community Senator following the 2007 federal election.

He headed the local chapter of the PFF in Büllingen from 1985 to 1990 and was the floor leader of the PFF fraction in the Parliament of the German-speaking Community from 1990 to 1999. He worked as an advisor in the cabinet of the Belgian Minister of the Foreign Affairs, Louis Michel from August 1999 to September 2003, and from September 2003 to January 2004, of the Belgian Minister of Finances, Didier Reynders. He was also the chairman of Ost Belgien Invest (OBI) and a municipal councillor in Büllingen from 2001 until his demise.
