= Acht (TV channel) =

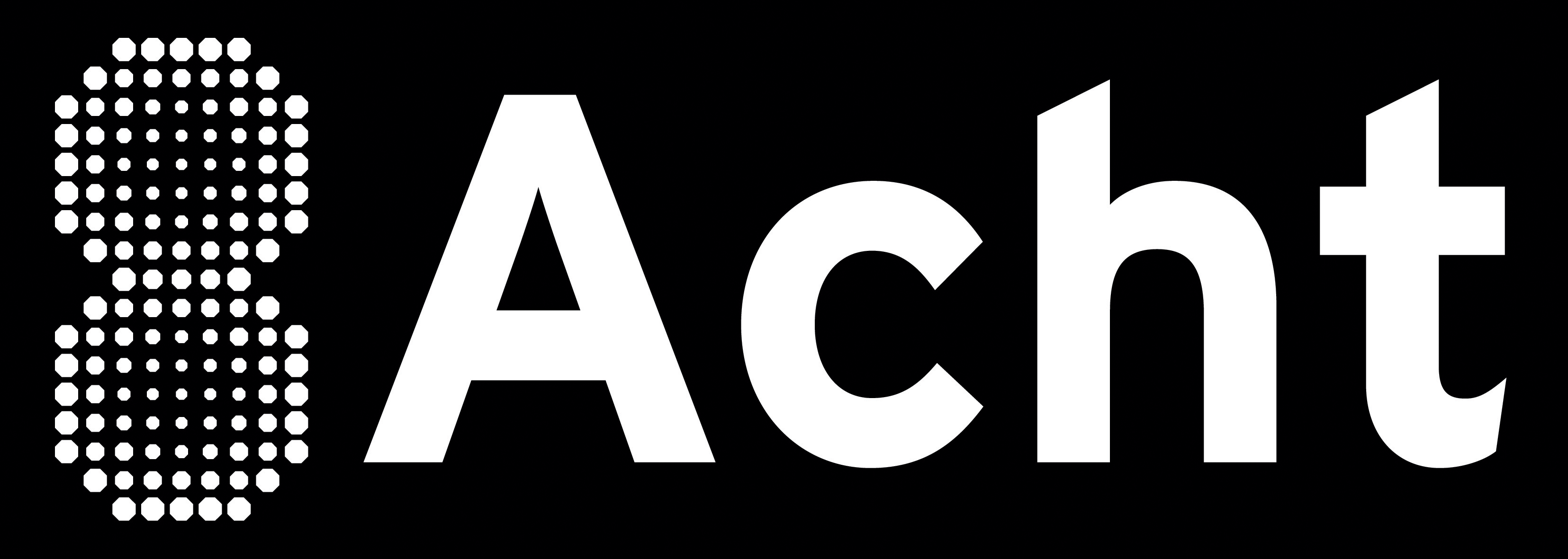
- Country: Belgium
- Broadcast area: Belgium

History
- Launched: 18 May 2009; 15 years ago
- Closed: 1 October 2016; 8 years ago
- Replaced by: CAZ; VTM4

Acht (Dutch for eight) was a Belgian digital television channel, owned by the Concentra group.

The channel was provided by Telenet, Belgacom TV, Numericable and TV Vlaanderen Digitaal. The channel broadcasts a different theme every night. Acht has a signed deal with HBO to broadcast its series.

In 2016 the TV channel was sold to Medialaan (now DPG Media), who announced it would change the name to CAZ. In August 2020, it eventually transforms itself in VTM4.
