= Qmusic TV =

Q-music TV
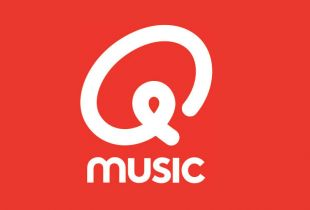
- Country: Belgium
- Headquarters: Vilvoorde, Belgium

Programming
- Picture format: 16:9 576i (SDTV)

Ownership
- Owner: DPG Media

History
- Launched: 20 February 2012

Links
- Website: q-music.be

Availability

Streaming media
- Q-music.be: Watch live
- YouTube: Watch live (); Watch live ()
- Yelo TV: Watch live (Belgium only)

Qmusic TV is the digital television channel of Qmusic Flanders. The channel started broadcasting on February 20, 2012. On the channel live footage from the studio and Twitter updates are seen. During some song's music videos are shown. The channel can be received via Telenet and Yelo TV, but is also available online via the website of Qmusic. Through Stievie programs can be requested again for seven days after broadcast.
