= Jacques Planchard =

Belgian politician

Jacques Planchard (May 18 1929 – 28 June 2013) was a Belgian politician, born in Virton. He was the Governor of Luxembourg from 1976 until 1996.

== Biography ==
Planchard attended KU Leuven and the University of Florida. Later, he joined the European Coal and Steel Community, where he worked for eighteen years.
