= 1966 in Belgian television =

This is a list of Belgian television related events from 1966.

== Births ==
- 2 April - Ivan Pecnik, actor
- 6 May - Steph Goossens, actor
- 27 August - Jo De Poorter, TV & radio host, journalist & actor
- 10 December - Kathy Pauwels, journalist & TV host
