= Thomas Blondeau =

Belgian writer, poet and journalist

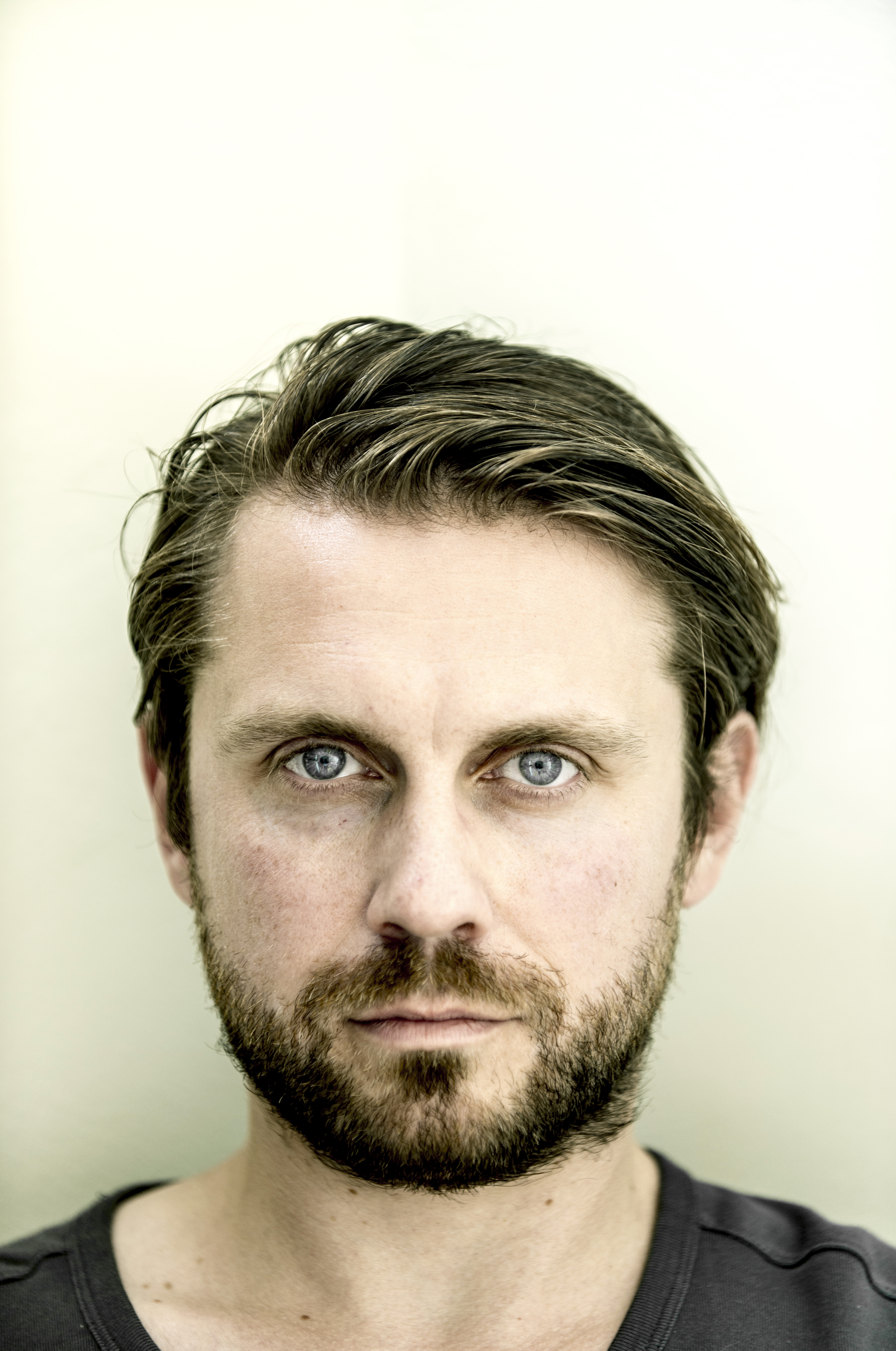
Blondeau (2013)

Thomas Blondeau (21 June 1978 in Poperinge – 20 October 2013 in Poperinge) was a Flemish writer, poet and journalist. He studied literature at the University of Leuven and the University of Leiden. He wrote for newspapers including Mare, Deng, De Revisor, De Standaard, and Dif.

== Career ==
After publishing poetry readings and short stories, he published his first novel, eX, which was well received in Belgium and the Netherlands. In early 2010 he published his second novel, Donderhart. In 2013, he published his third novel, Het West-Vlaams versierhandboek (English: The West Flemish Pick-up guide), which received positive reviews.

Thomas Blondeau died unexpectedly on 20 October 2013 of an aortic rupture in his hometown Poperinge.

== Bibliography ==
- eX, 2006, 351 blz., uitgeverij De Bezige Bij - Amsterdam, ISBN 9023420691
- Donderhart, 2010, 313 blz, uitgeverij De Bezige Bij - Amsterdam, ISBN 9789023454748
- Het West-Vlaams versierhandboek, 2013, 252 blz., uitgeverij De Bezige Bij – Amsterdam, ISBN 9789023477815
