= Raymond Trousson =

Belgian literary historian

Raymond Trousson (June 11, 1936 – June 25, 2013) was a Belgian literary historian, professor emeritus at Free University of Brussels and member of the Royal Academy of French Language and Literature of Belgium. His interests were focused on the classical authors of the 18th century.

He is known for a number of studies in Stoffgeschichte, thematic criticism, and literary history, mainly for the 18th century French literature. His biography of Rousseau is considered to be standard in French language.

== Works ==
- Le thème de Prométhée dans la littérature européene, 1964
- Un problème de littérature comparée: les études de thèmes, 1965.
- Socrate devant Voltaire, Diderot et Rousseau: la conscience en face du mythe, París, Lettres modernes, 1967
- Rousseau et sa fortune littéraire, Saint-Médard-en-Jalles, G. Ducros, 1971
- Voyages aux pays de nulle part. Histoire de la pensée utopique, Bruselas, ed. de l'Université, 1975. Tr.: Historia de la literatura utópica: viajes a países inexistentes, Edicions 62, 1995 ISBN 978-84-297-3940-4
- Le Thème de Prométhée dans la littérature européenne, Ginebra, Droz, 1976, 2 vols.
- Balzac disciple et juge de Jean-Jacques Rousseau, Ginebra, Droz; y París, 1983
- Le Tison et le flambeau: Victor Hugo devant Voltaire et Rousseau, Bruselas, ed. de l'Université, 1985
- Stendhal et Rousseau: continuité et ruptures, Colonia, DME, 1986
- Jean-Jacques Rousseau, París, Tallandier, 1988. Tr.: Jean Jacques Rousseau: gracia y desgracia de una conciencia, Alianza, 1995 ISBN 978-84-206-2805-9
- Charles De Coster ou La vie est un songe: biographie, Bruselas, éditions Labor, 1990
- Romans libertins du XVIII siècle, París, Robert Laffont, 1993
- Histoire de la libre pensée. Des origines à 1789, Bruselas, Espace de Libertés, col. "Laïcité", 1993, ISBN 2-930001-06-2.
- Isabelle de Charrière. Un destin de femme au XVIIIe siècle, Paris, Hachette, 1994.
- Dictionnaire Voltaire (dir.), París, Hachette, 1994; y Bruselas, Espace de Libertés, coll. "Laïcité", 1994, ISBN 2-930001-13-5
- Voltaire et les Droits de l'homme. Textes sur la justice et la tolérance (presentados y anotados), Espace de Libertés, col. "Laïcité", 1994, ISBN 2-930001-12-7.
- Dictionnaire de Jean-Jacques Rousseau (dir.), París, Honoré Champion, 1996.
- Romans de femmes du XVIII siècle: Mme. de Tencin, Mme. de Graffigny, Mme Riccoboni..., París, Robert Laffont, 1996.
- Images de Diderot en France, 1784-1913, París, Honoré Champion, 1997.
- D'Utopie et d'Utopistes, Paris-Montréal, L'Harmattan, 1998
- Dictionnaire de Diderot (dir.), París, Honoré Champion, 1999.
- Iwan Gilkin, poète de “La nuit”, Bruselas, éditions Labor, 1999.
- Visages de Voltaire: XVIII y XIX siècle, París, Honoré Champion, 2001.
- Religions d'utopie, Bruselas, Ousia, 2001
- Sciences, techniques et utopies. Du paradis à l'enfer, Paris, L'Harmattan, 2003.
- Antoine-Vincent Arnault (1766-1834): un homme de lettres entre classicisme et romantisme, París, Honoré Champion, 2004.
- Denis Diderot ou Le vrai Prométhée, París, Tallandier, 2005.
- Diderot jour après jour: chronologie, París, Honoré Champion, 2006.
- Denis Diderot, Gallimard, 2007.
- Voltaire, Tallandier, 2008.
- Charles De Coster, journaliste à l'Uylenspiegel, Bruselas, Espace de Libertés, col. "Laïcité", 2007, ISBN 2-930001-76-3
