= Davy Coenen =

Belgian mountain biker

Davy Coenen (2 April 1980 – 9 February 2010) was a Belgian mountain biker. He won both the Benelux Cup and the Flanders Cup. He also finished third in the 2007 Belgium championship.

While training to qualify for the 2012 Olympic Games Davy was diagnosed with a brain tumor in February 2009. He died of the tumor a year later at the age of 29.
