= 1991 in Belgian television =

This is a list of Belgian television related events from 1991.

== Events ==
- Unknown - Danny Supply as Bobby Hatfield wins the third season of VTM Soundmixshow.

== Debuts ==
- 30 December - Familie (1991–present)

== Television shows ==
=== 1980s ===
- VTM Soundmixshow (1989-1995, 1997–2000)

=== 1990s ===
- Jambers presented by Paul Jambers
- Samson en Gert (1990–present)

== Ending this year ==
- Tik Tak (1981–1991)

== Networks and services ==
=== Conversions and rebrandings ===
Old network name	New network name	Type	Conversion Date	Notes	Source
BRT TV2	BRTN TV2	Cable and satellite	Unknown		

== Births ==
- 5 October - Margot De Ridder, actress & singer

== See also ==
- 1991 in Belgium
