= Anne-Sylvie Mouzon =

Belgian politician (1956–2013)

Anne-Sylvie Mouzon (10 May 1956 – 10 September 2013) was a Belgian politician from the Socialist Party (PS). Born in Kisangani in the Belgian Congo, she received a law degree from the Université libre de Bruxelles and worked as a lawyer for various cabinet-members. Since 1982, she resided in Saint-Josse-ten-Noode and, in 1989, became a member of the Brussels Regional Parliament after Charles Picqué became Minister-President when the region's government was established. She was head of the PS for the French Community Commission of Brussels since 2004. She died from cancer on 10 September 2013 at the age of 57. She is survived by a husband and two children.
