= Pas de Deux (band) =

Belgian band

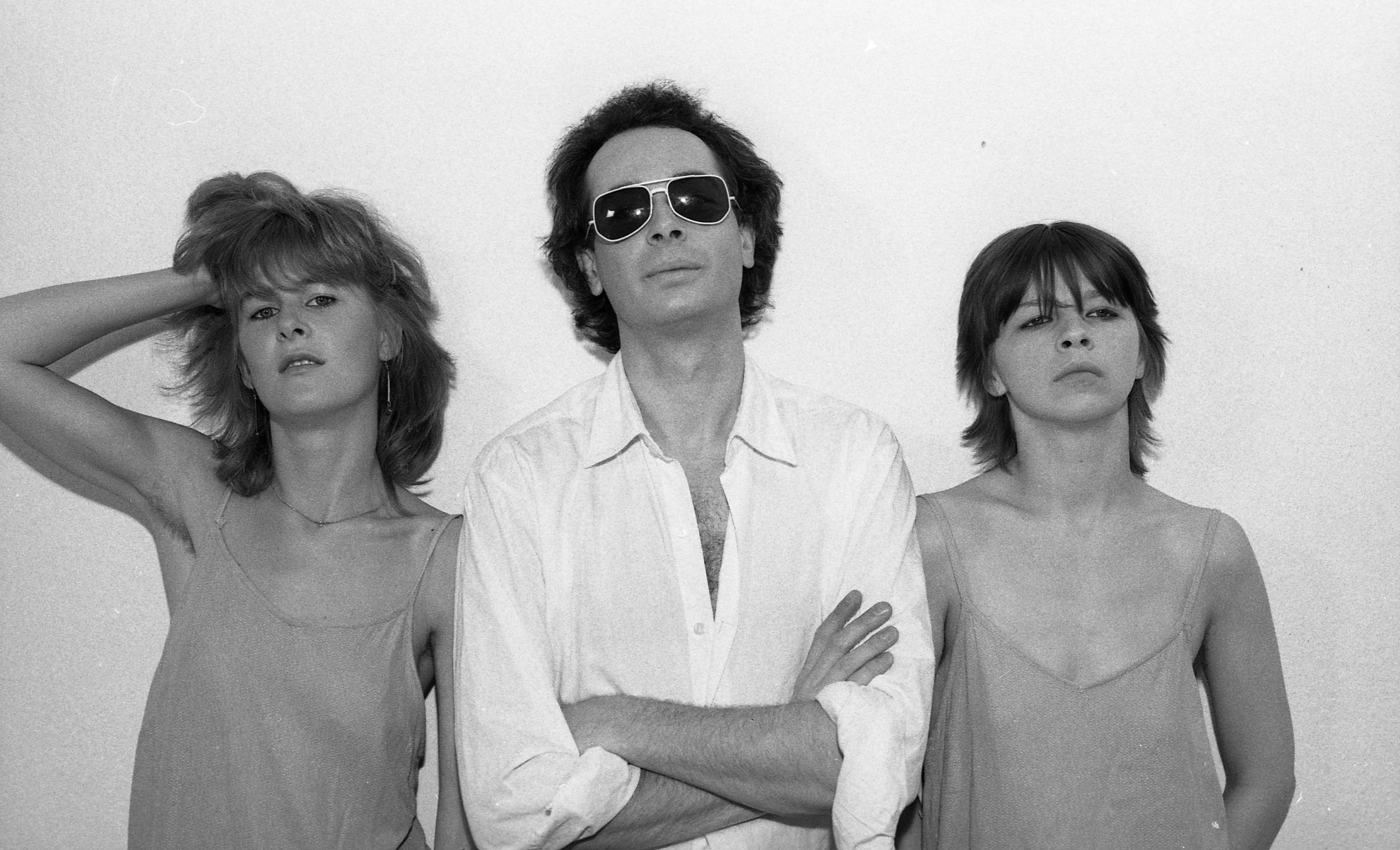
Pas de Deux in 1982

Pas de Deux (Walter Verdin, Dett Peyskens and Hilde van Roy) were a Belgian band, best known for their participation in the Eurovision Song Contest 1983, and the controversy surrounding their selection as that year's Belgian representatives. The band was formed by Verdin in Leuven in 1982.

== Eurovision Song Contest ==
Pas de Deux were one of nine acts chosen for the Belgian Eurovision selections in 1983. Initially, each act performed three songs and the best from each was chosen by a jury to go forward to the final. The final took place on 19 March, when Pas de Deux's song "Rendez-vous" was chosen from the nine entrants as Belgium's representative for the Eurovision Song Contest 1983. "Rendez-vous" consisted of just one line of quasi-nonsensical lyric ("Rendez-vous, maar de maat is vol en m'n kop is toe") repeated over a quirky, rhythmic instrumental track while Peyskens and van Roy danced barefoot, and seemed to baffle the conservative audience, a large proportion of which was supporting more mainstream singers Bart Kaëll and Wim de Craene. When it became apparent during the voting that "Rendez-vous" would be the clear winner with the jury, audience bewilderment turned to anger. There were jeers, whistles and catcalls, and many walked out in disgust before "Rendez-vous" was reprised. Pas de Deux themselves appeared untroubled by the reaction, seeming to be quite amused by the furore.

The contest itself was held on 23 April in Munich, and "Rendez-vous" proved unsuccessful, finishing in 18th place of the 20 entries, having received points from only the UK, Spain and Portugal. Despite the poor result however, "Rendez-vous" has come to be highly regarded in Eurovision circles, being seen as a prime example of a song which in terms of style and performance was too contemporary and risky to succeed with the then somewhat conservative Eurovision juries.

== After Eurovision ==
"Rendez-vous" reached the Belgian top 30, but a follow-up single, "Manimeme", went unnoticed and the group soon disbanded. Verdin went on to become a video artist and van Roy a television journalist, while Peyskens continued singing and acting.

== Discography ==
Singles

- 1982: "The Lonely Guys"
- 1983: "Rendez-vous"
- 1983: "Manimeme"

Mini album

- 1982: Des Tailles
- 1983: Axe Ends

== See also ==
- Belgium in the Eurovision Song Contest 1983

Preceded by Stella Maessen with "Si tu aimes ma musique"	Belgium in the Eurovision Song Contest; 1983	Succeeded by Jacques Zegers with "Avanti la vie"
