= Aloys Jousten =

Belgian theologian and bishop (1937–2021)

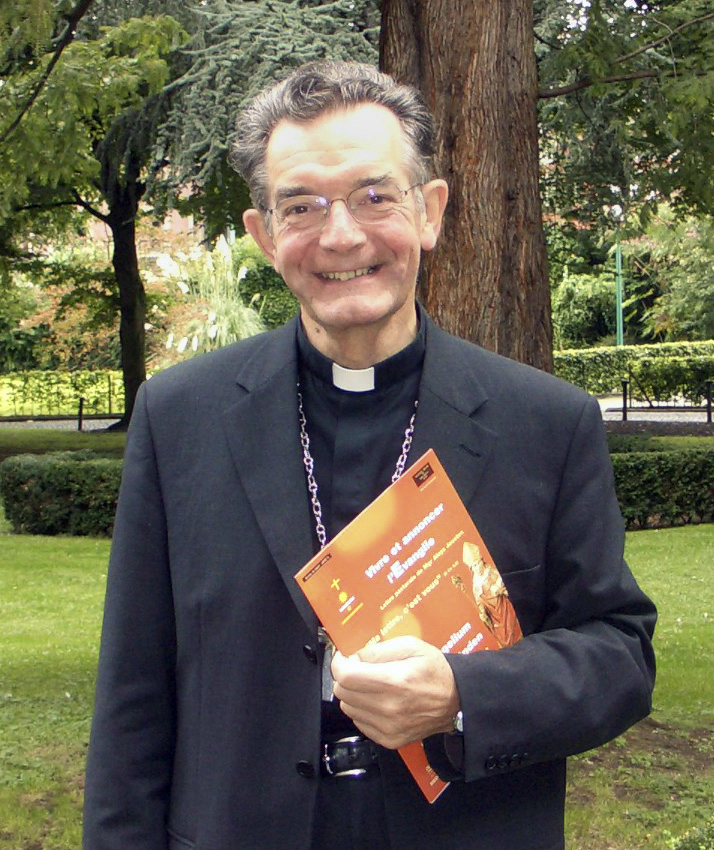
- Jousten in 2006
- Diocese: Liège
- See: St Paul's Cathedral, Liège
- Appointed: 2001
- Term ended: 2013
- Predecessor: Albert Houssiau
- Successor: Jean-Pierre Delville

Orders
- Ordination: 8 July 1962
- Consecration: 3 June 2001

Personal details
- Born: 2 November 1937 Sankt-Vith, Belgium
- Died: 20 September 2021 (aged 83) Cologne, Germany
- Motto: Gaudium Domini fortitudo nostra (The joy of the Lord is our strength, Neh 8:10)
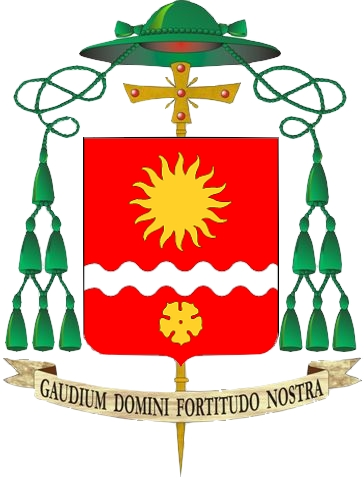
- Coat of arms

Aloys Jousten (2 November 1937 – 20 September 2021) was a Belgian Roman Catholic prelate who served as a bishop of the Diocese of Liège from 2001 until 2013.

Jousten was born in Sankt-Vith on 2 November 1937, and ordained priest in Liège on 8 July 1962. He held the degree of Doctor of Theology. He was nominated as the 91st Bishop of Liège on 9 May 2001, and was consecrated on 4 June the same year.

In 2009 he was named as a possible successor to Godfried Danneels as Archbishop of Mechelen-Brussels. He proffered his resignation as bishop of Liège in November 2012, having reached the age of 75, but agreed to remain as bishop until his successor was appointed. He retired on 31 May 2013.
