= Piet Huysentruyt =

Belgian chef

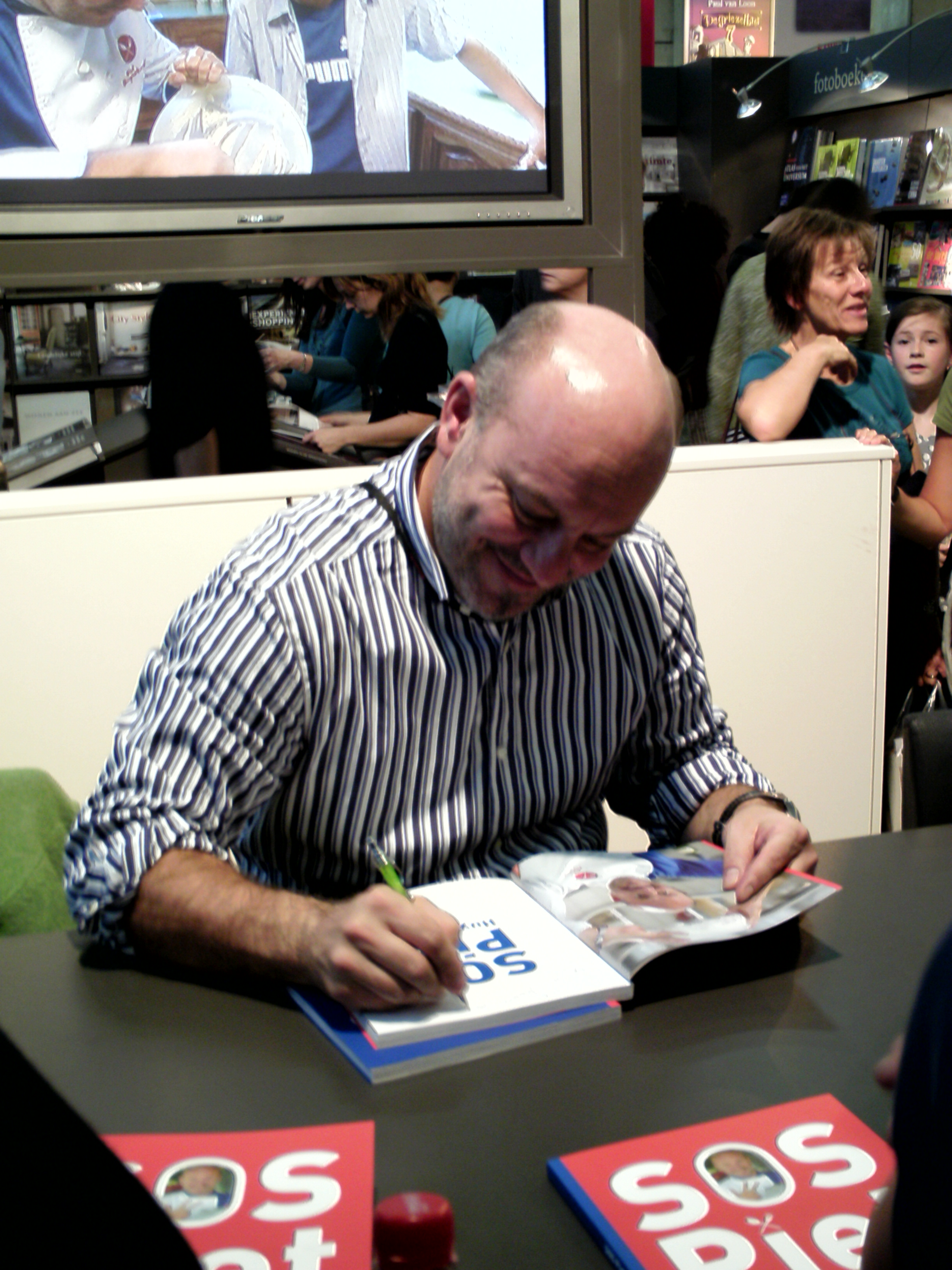
- Huysentruyt at the Antwerp Book Fair, 2008
- Born: 7 December 1962 (age 63)
- Education: Hotelschool Ter Duinen, Koksijde
- Culinary career
- Television show: SOS Piet
- Award won: Michelin star

Piet Huysentruyt (born 7 December 1962) is a Belgian TV chef and the author of five bestselling cooking books.

== Biography ==
Huytsentruyt, born in 1962, studied at the cooking school Ter Duinen in Koksijde before working in a number of restaurants in Belgium and abroad. He opened his own restaurant in Wortegem-Petegem, and got his first Michelin Guide star a few years later.

== Television ==
He starred in a few TV shows, the most famous being SOS Piet, which spawned two books.

== Publishing ==
By December 2008, he has sold 250,000 copies of his books SOS Piet and SOS Piet 2, and his books top the bestseller list in Flanders in December 2008. In December 2009, he appeared in the new film about Kabouter Plop, Plop en de Kabouterbaby.
