= 1990 in Belgian television =

This is a list of Belgian television related events from 1990.

== Events ==
- Unknown - Lisa del Bo performing as Dani Klein wins the second season of VTM Soundmixshow.

== Debuts ==
- 2 September - Samson en Gert (1990–present)

== Television shows ==
=== 1980s ===
- Tik Tak (1981-1991)
- VTM Soundmixshow (1989-1995, 1997-2000)

== Births ==
- 1 December - Eva Daeleman, TV & radio host
