= Félix Geybels =

Belgian footballer

Personal information
- Date of birth: 23 November 1935
- Date of death: 15 November 2013 (aged 77)
- Position: Defender

Senior career*
Years	Team	Apps	(Gls)
1952–1964	Beringen		

International career
1959	Belgium	1	(0)
- * Club domestic league appearances and goals

Félix Geybels (23 November 1935 – 15 November 2013) was a Belgian international footballer who primarily played as a defender.
