= 1988 in Belgian television =

This is a list of Belgian television related events from 1988.

== Events ==
- 27 February - Reynaert is selected to represent Belgium at the 1988 Eurovision Song Contest with his song "Laissez briller le soleil". He is selected to be the thirty-third Belgian Eurovision entry during Eurosong held at the RTBF Studios in Brussels.

== Television shows ==
=== 1980s ===
- Tik Tak (1981-1991)

== Networks and services ==
=== Conversions and rebrandings ===
Old network name	New network name	Type	Conversion Date	Notes	Source
Tele 2	Tele 21	Cable and satellite	Unknown		

== Births ==
- 22 January - Eline De Munck, actress, singer & TV host
- 9 June - Vincent Banić, actor, VJ & model
- 19 August - Niels Destadsbader, actor, TV host & singer
