= 1968 in Belgian television =

This is a list of Belgian television related events from 1968.

== Events ==
- 13 February - Claude Lombard is selected to represent Belgium at the 1968 Eurovision Song Contest with his song "Quand tu reviendras". He is selected to be the thirteenth Belgian Eurovision entry during Eurosong.
- Live broadcasts from the Tour of Flanders begin on an annual basis.

== Television shows ==
- Either 1968 or 21 February 1969 - Musti premieres.
