= 1989 in Belgian television =

This is a list of Belgian television related events from 1989.

== Events ==
- 1 February – The Dutch-language television station VTM officially starts its regular broadcasting service in Vilvoorde, Flemish Brabant.
- 18 March - Ingeborg is selected to represent Belgium at the 1989 Eurovision Song Contest with her song "Door de wind". She is selected to be the thirty-fourth Belgian Eurovision entry during Eurosong held at the Amerikaans Theater in Brussels.
- Unknown - Debut of VTM Soundmixshow, a series hosted by Bart Kaëll in which members of the public impersonate their favourite singers.
- Unknown - The first season of VTM Soundmixshow was won by Wim Peelman performing as Scott Walker.

== Debuts ==
- Unknown - VTM Soundmixshow (1989-1995, 1997-2000)

== Television shows ==
=== 1980s ===
- Tik Tak (1981-1991)

== Networks and services ==
=== Launches ===
Network	Type	Launch date	Notes	Source
VTM	Cable and satellite	1 February		

=== Conversions and rebrandings ===
Old network name	New network name	Type	Conversion Date	Notes	Source
TV5	TV5 Europe	Cable and satellite	Unknown		
