= 1967 in Belgian television =

This is a list of Belgian television related events from 1967.

== Events ==
- 25 February - Louis Neefs is selected to represent Belgium at the 1967 Eurovision Song Contest with his song "Ik heb zorgen". He is selected to be the twelfth Belgian Eurovision entry during Eurosong held at the Amerikaans Theater in Brussels.

== Television shows ==
- 8 March – Vibrato airs the music video for "Dead End Street" by The Kinks.

== Births ==
- 15 January - Peter van de Velde, actor
- 17 September - Koen Wauters, TV host
