= 1969 in Belgian television =

This is a list of Belgian television related events from 1969.

== Television shows ==
- Wij, Heren van Zichem (We, the lords of Zichem), a 26-episode drama series, is broadcast by BRT.

== Births ==
- 5 January - Mark Tijsmans, actor, singer & children's author
- 24 February - Johan Terryn, actor & TV & radio host
- 11 July - An Swartenbroekx, actress, TV host & singer
- 19 July - Daisy Thys, actress
- 29 July - Kadèr Gürbüz, actress & TV host
