= 1987 in Belgian television =

This is a list of Belgian television related events from 1987.

== Laws ==
- 28 January – The Belgian government passes a cable decree, setting out a framework for a single commercial, non-public television station to be established for the entire Dutch-speaking community in Belgium, with a monopoly on advertising. This effectively lifted the ban on broadcast advertising.
- 17 July – Another decree provides a legal framework for the introduction of private commercial television broadcasts in the French-speaking community.

== Events ==
- 14 March - Liliane Saint-Pierre is selected to represent Belgium at the 1987 Eurovision Song Contest with her song "Soldiers of Love". She is selected to be the thirty-second Belgian Eurovision entry during Eurosong held at the Amerikaans Theater in Brussels.
- 9 May - The 32nd Eurovision Song Contest is held at the Palais du Contenaire in Brussels. Ireland wins the contest with the song "Hold Me Now", performed by Johnny Logan. That made Logan the first performer to win the contest twice, as he had won also in 1980.

== Television shows ==
=== 1980s ===
- Tik Tak (1981-1991)
