= 1983 in Belgian television =

This is a list of Belgian television related events from 1983.

== Events ==
- 19 March - Pas de Deux are selected to represent Belgium at the 1983 Eurovision Song Contest with their song "Rendez-vous". They are selected to be the twenty-eighth Belgian Eurovision entry during Eurosong held at the Amerikaans Theater in Brussels.

== Television shows ==
=== 1980s ===
- Tik Tak (1981-1991)

== Births ==
- 10 January - Hein Blondeel, actor
- 26 August - Pim Symoens, singer & TV host
- 17 September - Erika Van Tielen, TV host
