= 1970 in Belgian television =

This is a list of Belgian television related events from 1970.

== Events ==
- 3 February - Jean Vallée is selected to represent Belgium at the 1970 Eurovision Song Contest with his song "Viens l'oublier". He is selected to be the fifteenth Belgian Eurovision entry during Eurosong.

== Births ==
- 17 July - Werner De Smedt, actor
- 5 August - Rani De Coninck, TV & radio host
- 22 December - Mathias Sercu, actor & writer
