= 1973 in Belgian television =

This is a list of Belgian television related events from 1973.

== Events ==
- 25 February - Nicole & Hugo are selected to represent Belgium at the 1973 Eurovision Song Contest with their song "Baby, Baby". They are selected to be the eighteenth Belgian Eurovision entry during Eurosong.

== Births ==
- 12 January - Tania Kloek, actress
- 22 February - Sandrine André, actress
- 19 March - Deborah Ostrega, TV host, actress & singer
- 13 August - Britt Van Der Borght, actress & singer
