= 1971 in Belgian television =

This is a list of Belgian television related events from 1971.

== Events ==
- Colour television broadcasting begins in Belgium.
- 6 February - Nicole & Hugo are selected to represent Belgium at the 1971 Eurovision Song Contest with their song "Goeiemorgen, morgen". They are selected to be the sixteenth Belgian Eurovision entry during Eurosong held at the Amerikaans Theater in Brussels. Shortly before Eurovision, Nicole had fallen ill and was unable to travel to Dublin, so broadcaster BRT, predecessor of VRT, drafted in Jacques Raymond and Lily Castel as late replacements.

== Births ==
- 11 February - Hans Otten, TV host
- 14 March - Kürt Rogiers, actor & TV host
- 1 December - Peter Van de Veire, radio personality
