= 1986 in Belgian television =

This is a list of Belgian television-related events from 1986.

== Events ==
- 2 March - Sandra Kim is selected to represent Belgium at the 1986 Eurovision Song Contest with her song "J'aime la vie". She is selected to be the thirty-first Belgian Eurovision entry during Eurosong held at the RTBF Studios in Brussels.
- 3 May - Belgium wins the 31st Eurovision Song Contest in Bergen, Norway. The winning song is "J'aime la vie", performed by 13-year-old Sandra Kim.

== Television shows ==
=== 1980s ===
- Tik Tak (1981-1991)

== Births ==
- 24 May - Antony Arandia, actor
- 27 May - Timo Descamps, actor, voice actor, singer & TV host
- 13 October - Sam De Bruyn, TV & radio host at StuBru
