= 1984 in Belgian television =

This is a list of Belgian television related events from 1984.

== Events ==
- 2 March - Jacques Zegers is selected to represent Belgium at the 1984 Eurovision Song Contest with his song "Avanti la vie". He is selected to be the twenty-ninth Belgian Eurovision entry during Eurosong held at the RTBF Studios in Brussels.
- July – The government of Zaire flies Belgian television journalists to Matadi to film voting at the presidential election, in which Mobutu Sese Seko won 99.16% of the vote.

== Television shows ==
=== 1980s ===
- Tik Tak (1981-1991)

== Networks and services ==
=== Launches ===
| Network | Type | Launch date | Notes | Source |
|---|---|---|---|---|
| TV5 | Cable and satellite | 2 January | | |
| Music Box | Cable television | 29 March | | |

== Births ==
- 13 February - Sean Dhondt, TV & radio host
- 20 February - Sofie Van Moll, actress & TV & radio host
- 11 June - Kobe Van Herwegen, actor, TV host & magician
- 3 July - Sandrine Van Handenhoven, singer & TV host
