= 1972 in Belgian television =

This is a list of Belgian television related events from 1972.

== Viewership ==
- In 1972, only 9.3% of Belgian television households had access to cable television.

== Television shows ==
- Le Danseur, a Belgian television film about dancer Jorge Dunn, is broadcast.

== Births ==
- 22 March – Katja Retsin, TV host
- 24 July – Geert Hunaerts, actor
- 24 December – Francesca Vanthielen, TV host
