= 1978 in Belgian television =

This is a list of Belgian television related events from 1978.

== Events ==
- 8 February - Jean Vallée is selected to represent Belgium at the 1978 Eurovision Song Contest with his song "L'amour ça fait chanter la vie". He is selected to be the twenty-third Belgian Eurovision entry during Eurosong.

== Births ==
- 3 May - Anneke van Hooff, actress & singer
- 26 May - Elke Vanelderen, TV host
- 7 June - Mathias Coppens, actor
- 10 June - Gerrit De Cock, TV host
- 13 August - Tiany Kiriloff, TV host
- 24 October - Christophe Haddad, actor
- 9 November - Evi Hanssen, singer & TV host
