= 1982 in Belgian television =

This is a Belgian television related events from 1982.

The year marks a radical shift in public policy regarding television as the newly-elected coalition decides to give the national network RTL-Belgique the official monopoly of advertising.

== Events ==
- 21 February - Stella is selected to represent Belgium at the 1982 Eurovision Song Contest with her song "Si tu aimes ma musique". She is selected to be the twenty-seventh Belgian Eurovision entry during Eurosong held at the RTBF Studios in Brussels.

== Networks and services ==
=== Launches ===
Network	Type	Launch date	Notes	Source
Satellite Television, Ltd.	Satellite television	April		
