= 1980 in Belgian television =

This is a list of Belgian television related events from 1980.

== Events ==
- 24 February - Telex are selected to represent Belgium at the 1980 Eurovision Song Contest with their song "Euro-Vision". They are selected to be the twenty-fifth Belgian Eurovision entry during Eurosong held at the RTBF Studios in Brussels.

== Births ==
- 14 January - Anneleen Liégeois, actress & TV host
- 8 February - Free Souffriau, actress & singer
- 8 September - An Lemmens, TV & radio host
- 9 November - Ellen Dufour, singer & TV host
