= 1975 in Belgian television =

This is a list of Belgian television related events from 1975.

== Events ==
- 1 March - Ann Christy is selected to represent Belgium at the 1975 Eurovision Song Contest with her song "Gelukkig zijn". She is selected to be the twentieth Belgian Eurovision entry during Eurosong held at the Amerikaans Theater in Brussels.

== Births ==
- 14 January - Tom Coninx, sports journalist
- 21 November - Sandy Blanckaert, model & TV host
