= Tik Tak =

Belgian television series

- Genre: Educational; Preschool
- Created by: Mil Lenssens
- Opening theme: "Sleep Baby Sleep"
- Country of origin: Belgium
- Original language: None
- No. of episodes: 366 (original series); 104 (revival series)

Production
- Running time: 5 minutes

Original release
- Network: BRT (now the VRT); CBeebies (UK)
- Release: 1 November 1981 – 24 August 2020

Related
- Hopla

Tik Tak is a Belgian preschool educational television series created by Mil Lenssens that aired on BRTN from 1 November 1981 to 25 December 1991 and CBeebies in 2020.

== History ==
The program was conceived by Mil Lenssens when he saw some children fascinated by the broadcast of a lottery draw. The predictable, repetitive mix of colors, movement and musical rhythms he then developed in the program, along with Clien De Vuyst.

== Concept ==
There were 366 episodes produced (enough for one year, with one extra episode for leap years). Each episode begins with sheep (and the occasional dog) at sunset on a rotating platform, and ends with a shadow figure (Ann Ricour), who has all kinds of adventures in five differently colored books.

The first broadcast of the program took place on 1 November 1981 on the BRTN (originally called BRT). It was broadcast on Ketnet in Belgium until 2006.

The program was sold to about 30 countries, among them Australia, the United Kingdom, The Netherlands, Israel, Saudi Arabia, the United States and South Africa. It is thus one of the biggest export products Belgian television has known. It also aired on BVN TV in its early years.

On 2 April 2000, Hopla was released as a spiritual successor of Tik Tak. Though unrelated, Hopla was also made in Belgium, targeted the same infant demographics, and had little to no dialogue.

== Tik Tak 2.0 ==
In 2019, a new Tik Tak 2.0 series was remade into 52 HD episodes, now broadcast on Ketnet, NPO Zappelin as well as on BBC. The first series aired in 2019 on Ketnet, aired on CBeebies on 24 August 2020 and started airing on ABC Kids in Australia on 7 October the same year. A second series of 52 HD episodes began airing on Ketnet and CBeebies in 2020.

== In popular culture ==
In July 2012, the German house duo Digitalism released the song "Falling" from which the clip consisted of fragments of Tik Tak.
