= Television in Belgium =

Television in Belgium was introduced in 1953 and began with one channel each in Dutch and French. The country is heavily cabled, with 93% of households watching television through cable as of 2003.

== History ==
The three Belgian Communities – Dutch, French and German-speaking – have legal responsibility for audiovisual communication. They constitute separate markets, the common feature of which is the fact that they have been extensively cabled for three decades and are thus able to receive neighbouring countries' channels.

From 1930 broadcasting in Belgium was in the hands of National Institute of Radio Broadcasting (Nationaal Institut voor Radio-omroep, NIR; Institut national de radiodiffusion, INR). The organisation had separate services on TV and Radio in Flemish and French. In 1960 this organisation was split up into two organisation responsible to the Flemish and Walloon communities for public radio and television services. BRT (Belgische Radio en Televisie), now VRT (Vlaamse Radio- en Televisieomroeporganisatie), for the Flemish community and 1978, RTB (Radiodiffusion-télévision belge), now RTBF, for the Walloon (Francophone) community. There were also radio programmes for German-speaking Belgians who since 1965 have a separate organisation now known as BRF.

VRT and RTBF share broadcasting facilities in Brussels, while BRF operates from Eupen. VRT broadcasts in Flanders and RTBF in Wallonia. Both RTBF and VRT broadcast in Brussels Capital Region.

== Channels ==
=== Domestic channels ===
There are no national TV channels in Belgium. Because of the language divide, there are only channels either in Dutch or French; there is no single company operating TV channels in both the Flemish and the French part. Media laws are created and controlled on a regional level (Flemish or French). Thus the Flemish channels are controlled by Flemish law and the French-speaking ones are controlled by the French community. The public broadcasters still share a building in Brussels, a leftover from the time when the Public Television was still a national (Belgian) competence, however, they have split operations altogether with French language broadcaster RTBF occupying the right half of the building and Flemish broadcaster VRT occupying the left half of the building. They are both governed by different law and a different parliament an example of this is the fact that the French languages public broadcaster RTBF is allowed to sell advertising on television and have actual ad breaks, while the Flemish public broadcaster can only sell product placement and sponsor billboards on television. On their radio channels both are allowed to sell full ad breaks. Both public broadcasters also work in a completely different competitive environment.

The two main Belgian public TV networks, VRT in the Flemish Community and RTBF in the French Community of Belgium, broadcast their channels via operators using cable, satellite, IPTV and digital terrestrial television (DVB-T2). In the French community of Belgium the channels of RTBF can be received by DVB-T2 free of charge. The privately owned channels of the French community are not available on digital terrestrial television. In the Flemish part of Belgium all channels of the public tv (VRT) and the most important privately owned channels are available on all platforms (including DVB-T2), however the public TV is not available free of charge through DVB-T2 but part of a subscription service that includes the most important privately owned channels as well. This subscription is offered by TV Vlaanderen which also offers satellite tv subscriptions.

In the Flemish part there are three main broadcast groups:

1. VRT (the public broadcaster) which has the TV channels VRT 1, VRT Canvas and Ketnet.
2. DPG Media (formerly Medialaan and before that VMMa) is the main Flemish commercial TV group which runs the channels vtm, vtm2, vtm3, vtm4, vtm Gold and vtm Series.
3. Play Media is the 2nd Flemish commercial group which runs the channels Play, Play Fictie, Play Actie, Play Reality and Play Crime. The word Play is used because the channels are owned by Telenet Group, the biggest digital TV provider in Flanders, and its on demand SVOD offer already is branded Play and Play More while its linear pay tv channels are branded Play Sports and Play More Cinema, Play More Kicks, Play More Relax, Play More Black.

These three broadcast groups combined generate about 80% of the total market share daily with VRT being the biggest with a market share of just above 36% (all channels combined), DPG Media taking about 31% (all channels combined) and Play Media taking about 12% (all channels combined).
The channels één and vtm are the main players in terms of daily newscasts and local content with primetime being filled for 90% with local productions or local versions of international formats. Vier(4) also has started programming mainly local productions in the primetime slot. All other channels air a majority of international (mostly US made) productions in original language (English) with subtitles. The only exception is children's programming which is dubbed in Dutch.
Apart from these main groups there are dozens of other local or localised versions of other channels. e.g. MTV, Nickelodeon, National Geographic, and Discovery Channel.

In the French part there are three main broadcast groups:

1. RTBF (the public broadcaster) which has the TV channels La Une, Tipik (formerly La Deux) and La Trois
2. RTL Group Belgium (the main French-speaking commercial TV group) which runs the channels RTL-TVI, RTL Club, RTL Plug and RTL District. It was owned by RTL Group before being sold in 2022.
3. Mediawan Thematics (formerly AB Groupe; the 2nd French-speaking commercial group) which runs the channels AB3 and ABX (formerly AB4).

RTL Group attracts about 25% of market share daily (all channels combined) and RTBF also has about 25% average daily market share (all channels combined). The channels La Une and RTL-TVI are the main channels with local newscasts and the most local programming. Local programming however is relatively limited in the French part. Primetime is often filled with international shows dubbed in French or French tv shows. Up to 70% of the French-speaking Belgians turn on a domestic channel on average every night, up from 55% a few years ago. The success of French channel TF1 makes this a more fragmented market with TF1 sometimes having up to 15% market share in the French part of Belgium. TF1 even has localised ad breaks. Local Belgian channels find it sometimes difficult to compete with French TV which has vastly larger production budgets due to the market size difference (France having an addressable audience 15 times the size of the French part of Belgium) but in the past years the local channels have been investing in local qualitative drama and entertainment which has increased market share and viewership.

=== Foreign channels ===
Because of the country's small size and proximity to neighbors, by 1972 a Brussels home with a modified television and good antenna could receive, in addition to the two domestic channels, nine more from France, Germany, the Netherlands, and Luxembourg. The domestic French and Dutch channels share programs with networks in France and the Netherlands, respectively.

Apart from the channels listed above, most cable, satellite and IPTV platforms in Belgium distribute television stations from other European countries including the Netherlands, Germany, France, and the United Kingdom. Most people are able to receive NPO 1, NPO 2, and NPO 3 from Netherlands Public Broadcasting as well as Das Erste and ZDF, BBC One, BBC Two, BBC News, TF1, France 2, France 3, France 4, France 5 and Rai 1.

== Cable ==
In Belgium, over 95% of all households have cable television (analog and DVB-C).

=== Flanders ===
Telenet is the main cable network operator in Flanders, the northern region of Belgium. It has around 25 analogue TV channels which are also available digitally on a DVB-C Multimedia Home Platform TV service. In total about 80 TV channels are available digitally. This includes some TV channels that were already available in analogue and digital form: Prime (in Dutch) or BeTV (in French) are pay-TV operators broadcasting several SDTV channels over one DVB-C multiplex. Telenet is however pushing for their DVB-C channels as interactive Digital TV, using their cable network for uplink purposes.

Current cable customers do not need to pay an extra subscription for about 35 digital channels, but they must purchase a set-top box in order to view these digital channels and use the interactive services.

Telenet offers Dutch-language or Dutch-subtitled versions of Nick Jr., Boomerang, Cartoon Network, Eurosport, National Geographic Channel, E!, History, Animal Planet and Discovery Channel.

HDTV was expected from summer 2006, to coincide with the 2006 FIFA World Cup, but has not materialized. Despite Telenet, confirmed as part of its launch announcement of "Telenet Digital TV" on 16 June 2005 that it would sell HDTV set-top-boxes as of June 2006, HDTV capable set-top boxes for Telenet interactive digital TV were only available in December 2007. In 2009 Telenet already offered 15 HD channels on its digital network.

From July 2005 Integan, a cable network operator in the outskirts of the city of Antwerp, is offering HDTV. Integan was fully integrated in the Telenet cable network from 2009 onwards.

=== Brussels ===
The main cable network operators in the Brussels Region are VOO (owned by Orange Belgium since 2023) and Telenet (after the acquisition of the Belgian operations and networks of Numéricable in 2017).

=== Wallonia ===
VOO is the main cable network operator in Wallonia, the southern part of Belgium. Some regions are still covered by independent operators or by Telenet (see above).

== Terrestrial ==
Since 1 December 2018, only RTBF broadcasts its channels free-to-air on the terrestrial DVB-T network within the French Community of Belgium.

Analogue terrestrial broadcasts using the PAL standard were phased out in favor of digital terrestrial services in 2008 (Flemish side; switched off on 1 December 2018) and 2010 (French-speaking side), for which an overwhelming majority of clients required rental of proprietary decoders.

=== Flanders and Brussels ===
VRT can be received all over Flanders and Brussels.

Analogue terrestrial TV transmission of VRT Eén and VRT Ketnet/Canvas ended on 3 November 2008. The VRT multiplex transmission from Egem moved from channel 40 (626 MHz) to channel 22 (482 MHz); that from Genk on channel 41 (634 MHz) will move to channel 25 (506 MHz), and that from Antwerpen and Schoten on channel 59 (778 MHz) will move to channel 25 (506 MHz) as well. The VRT multiplex transmissions from Brussels, Gent, Sint-Pieters-Leeuw, and Veltem will continue to operate on channel 22 (482 MHz). The move to lower frequencies may result in a slight increase in coverage area of the transmissions.

In May 2018, VRT announced it would cease its free-to-air DVB-T broadcasts on 1 December 2018, citing "changing media consumption usage.' According to the broadcaster, just 45,000 people were using the DTT broadcasts as their means of reception, which was costing more than 1 million euros a year to sustain.

=== Wallonia and Brussels ===
RTBF launched its DTT platform on 30 November 2007, which is now available to most of French-speaking Belgium and Brussels. It offers La Une and La Deux. RTBF also launched a new channel exclusive to DTT called La Trois, and they added a fourth channel to the multiplex, namely Euronews, a pan-European news channel.

In Eastern Wallonia, there is a 2-hours regional variation on Euronews for BRF TV, public channel of the German-speaking Community of Belgium.

RTBF switched off analogue broadcast on 1 March 2010, thus making Belgium complete its digital transition.

== Satellite ==
TV Vlaanderen offers DVB-S and DVB-S2 satellite television aimed at the Flemish, Dutch speaking market, broadcasting (encrypted using Nagravision) via the Astra 1L and Astra 1M Satellite at 19.2°E. An updated list of channels can be found online. It has more than 60,000 subscribers.

TéléSAT Numérique offers DVB-S and DVB-S2 satellite television aimed at the Walloons, French-speaking market, broadcasting (using Nagravision) via the Eutelsat Hot Bird satellite at 13°E and also SES Astra Astra 19.2°E. An updated list of channels can be found and includes RTBF La Une, RTBF La Deux, RTL-TVi, and Club RTL and Plug TV in SD and HD as well as a number of French language Belgian radio stations.

Both TV Vlaanderen and TeleSat are Belgian subsidiaries of the M7 Group S.A., who also owns the Dutch DTH platform, CanalDigitaal.

VRT has an international channel on digital satellite (DVB-S) called BVN (as a cooperation between the Flemish VRT and the Dutch NOS).

RTBF programmes are available via the international joint broadcaster TV5MONDE.

(See also Euro1080.)

== Other technologies ==
=== IPTV ===
Proximus (formerly Belgacom) is offering digital television (IPTV) via ADSL2+, VDSL, VDSL2 and FTTH using its nationwide copper network. Its offering has been extended with two optional bouquets: one for movies and one selection for families, including Cartoon Network and National Geographic Channel

Other private companies provide a similar service, using the Belgacom copper network.

=== Digital terrestrial television ===
With the advent of mobile digital receivers (DVB-H), Proximus is showing some interest in building a DVB-H network.

== Most-viewed channels ==
Source: Hrvatska turistička zajednica (2022)

French-speaking area
Rank	Channel	Group	Share of total viewing (%)
1	La Une	RTBF	20.1%
2	RTL TVI	RTL Group	19.5%
3	TF1	TF1 Group	12.4%
4	France 2	France Televisions	7%
5	Tipik	RTBF	4.7%
6	AB3	AB Groupe	4.5%
7	Club RTL	RTL Group	3.5%
8	Plug RTL	RTL Group	1.8%
9	Arte	Arte	1.7%
10	France 5	France Televisions	1.4%

Dutch-speaking area
Rank	Channel	Group	Share of total viewing (%)
1	VRT 1	VRT	30.1%
2	vtm	DPG Media	19.5%
3	Play4	Telenet	7.2%
4	VRT Canvas	VRT	5.4%
5	vtm3	DPG Media	4.3%
6	vtm2	DPG Media	3.8%
7	Play5	Telenet	3.0%
8	Play6	Telenet	2.1%
9	vtm4	DPG Media	2.0%
10	Ketnet	VRT	1.3%

== See also ==
- List of television stations in Belgium
