= 1891 in Belgium =

- Decades: 1870s; 1880s; 1890s; 1900s; 1910s
- See also: Other events of 1891; List of years in Belgium

Events in the year 1891 in Belgium.

== Incumbents ==
- Monarch: Leopold II
- Prime Minister: Auguste Marie François Beernaert

== Events ==
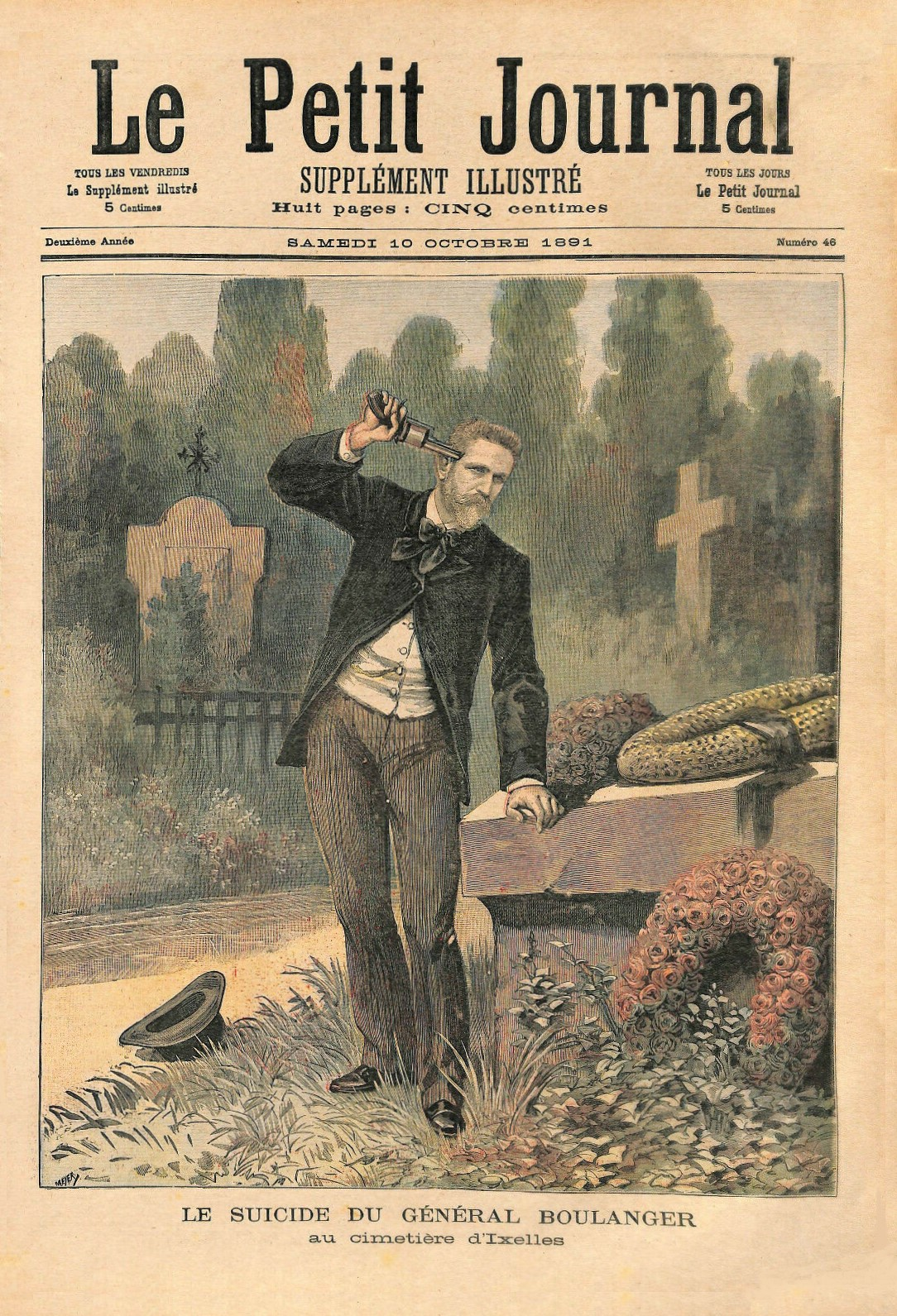
General Boulanger's suicide in Ixelles

- 29 January – Funeral of Prince Baudouin of Belgium.
- 2–20 May – Miners' strike in Liège, spreading to other parts of Wallonia.
- 10 May – Dock strikes in Antwerp and Ghent in support of coalminers in Wallonia.
- 16–22 August – International Socialist Labor Congress of Brussels
- 31 August – Brussels Conference Act of 1890 enters into force.
- 8–12 September – Catholic Congress in Mechelen
- 30 September – French politician Georges Ernest Boulanger commits suicide at the tomb of his mistress in Ixelles Cemetery.
- 27 November – New law against tramps and beggars

== Publications ==
Periodicals

- Gazet van Antwerpen begins publication
- Het Volk begins publication
- Annales de la Société d'archéologie de Bruxelles, vol. 5.
- La Jeune Belgique, vol. 10.

Literature

- Jules Destrée, L'oeuvre lithographique de Odilon Redon (Brussels, Edmond Deman)
- Maurice Maeterlinck, Les Sept Princesses
- Stephane Mallarmé, Pages (Brussels, Edmond Deman)
- John of Ruusbroec, L'Ornement des noces spirituelles, translated by Maurice Maeterlinck
- Émile Verhaeren, Les flambeaux noirs (Brussels, Edmond Deman)

== Art and architecture ==
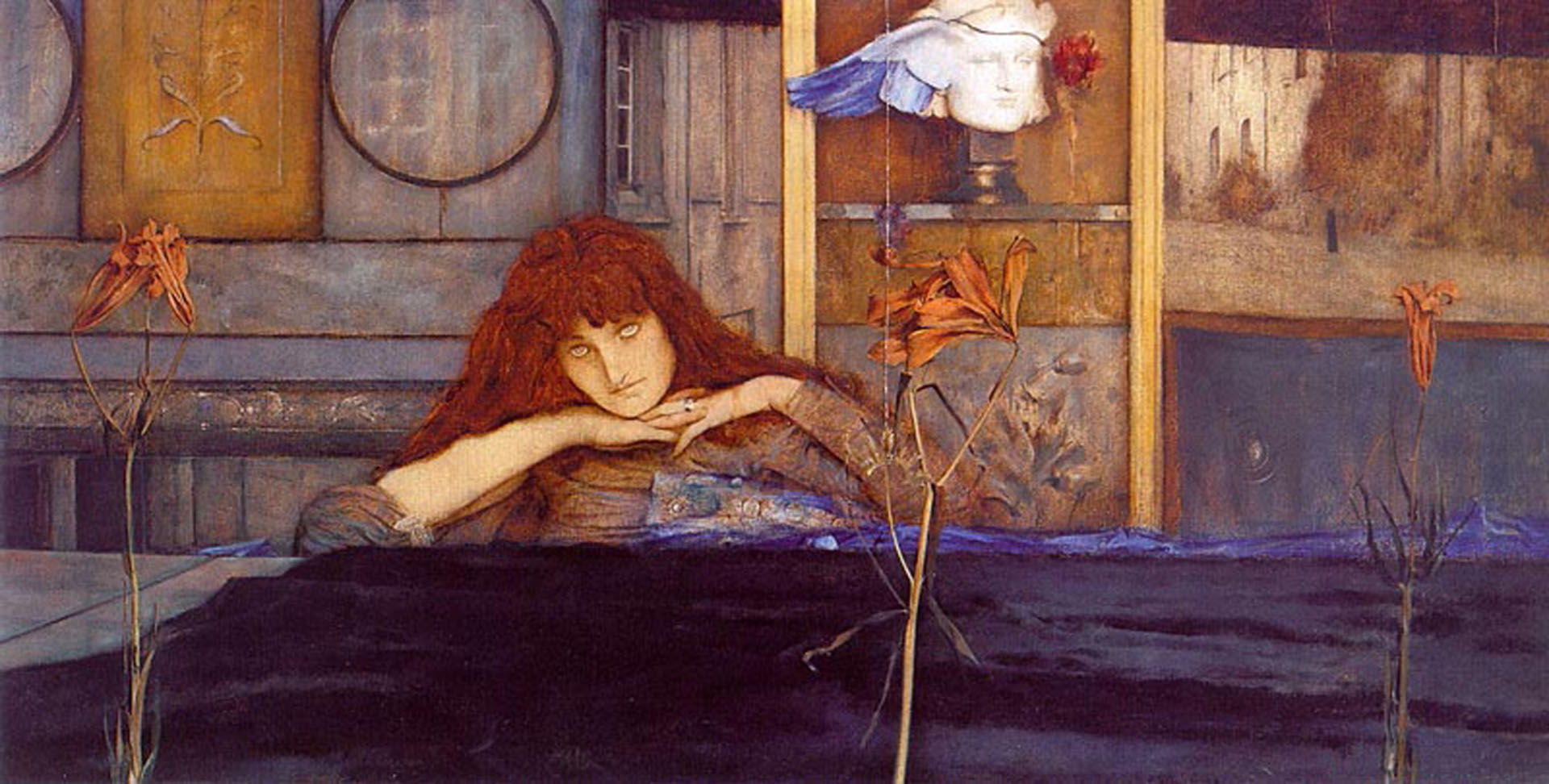
Fernand Khnopff, I lock my door upon myself (1891)

- L'Essor disbands

Paintings

- James Ensor, The Man of Sorrows
- Fernand Khnopff, I lock my door upon myself
- Théo van Rysselberghe, Maria Sèthe at the Harmonium

== Births ==
- 19 January – Joseph De Craecker, fencer (died 1975)
- 29 January – Henri Van Lerberghe, cyclist (died 1966)
- 18 February – Henry George, cyclist (died 1976)
- 25 March – Filip De Pillecyn, writer (died 1962)
- 2 April – Marthe Crick-Kuntziger, museum curator (died 1963)
- 3 May – Henri Rolin, politician (died 1973)
- 20 June – Jeanne Hebbelynck, artist (died 1959)
- 24 June – René Pinchart, gymnast (died 1970)
- 10 August – Andries Mac Leod, mathematician (died 1977)
- 7 September – Georges Cuisenaire, educator (died 1975)
- 12 September – Jean-François Martial, actor (died 1977)
- 18 November – Marie Delcourt, classicist (died 1979)
- 23 November – Pierre Ryckmans, governor of Belgian Congo (died 1959)
- 9 December
  - Léon Bekaert, industrialist and politician (died 1961)
  - John Langenus, football referee (died 1952)
- 29 December – Alphonse Van Mele, gymnast (died 1972)

== Deaths ==
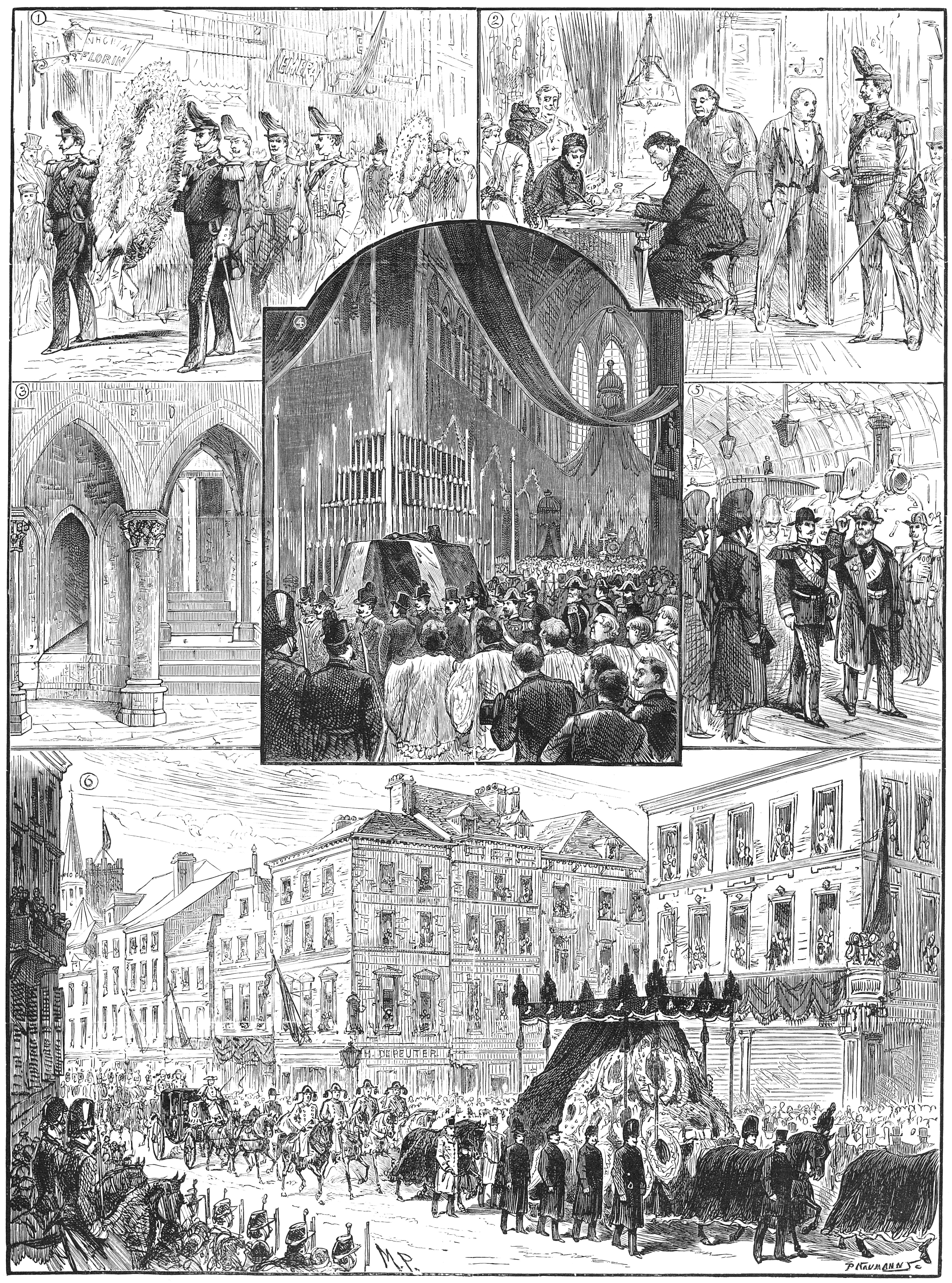
Funeral of Prince Baudouin of Belgium, 29 January 1891

- 4 January – Pierre de Decker (born 1812), politician
- 23 January – Prince Baudouin of Belgium (born 1869)
- 28 January – Eduard Wallays (born 1813), artist
- 4 March – Camille Coquilhat (born 1853), colonial officer
- 20 May – Paul Émile de Puydt (born 1810), writer
- 31 July – Jean-Baptiste Capronnier (born 1814), glass painter
- 17 August – Jean-Joseph Thonissen (born 1817), legal historian and politician
- 28 October – Louis Roersch (born 1831), philologist
- 16 November – Camille van Camp (born 1834), painter
- 2 December – Caroline Boussart (born 1808), feminist
- 13 December – Jean Stas (born 1813), analytical chemist
- 20 December – Victor Jacobs (born 1838), politician

Date to be determined

- Chantal Coché (born 1826), industrialist
