= 1895 in Belgium =

- Decades: 1870s; 1880s; 1890s; 1900s; 1910s
- See also: Other events of 1895; List of years in Belgium

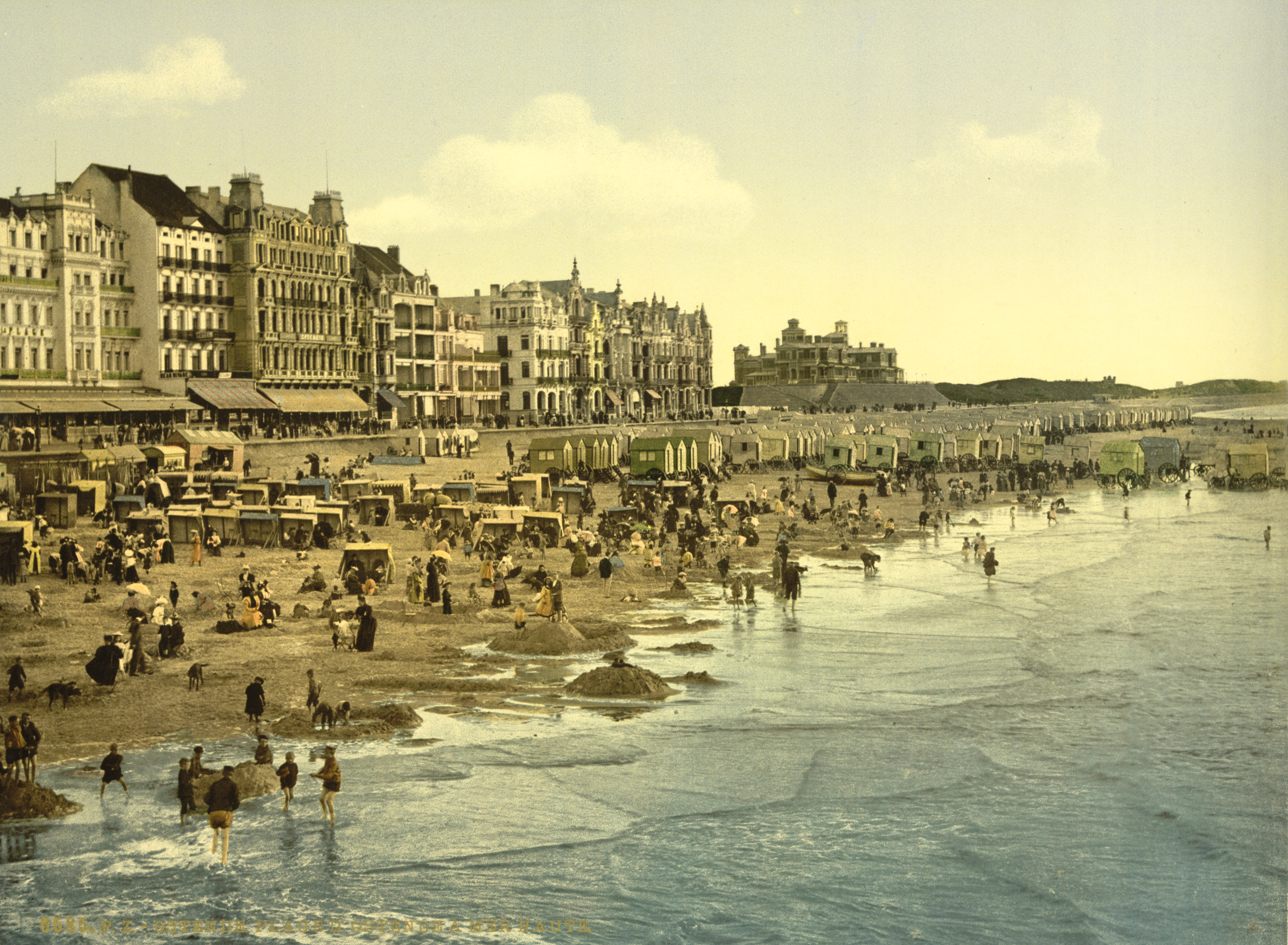
The beach at Ostend (c. 1895)

Events in the year 1895 in Belgium.

== Incumbents ==
- Monarch: Leopold II
- Prime Minister: Jules de Burlet

== Events ==
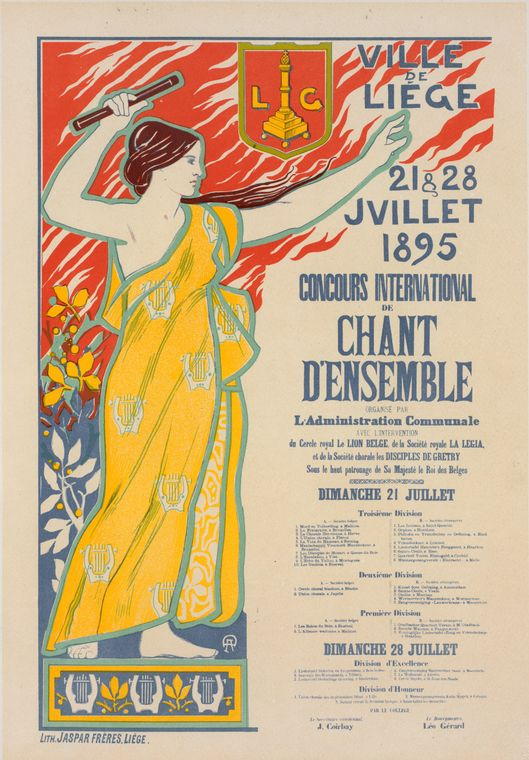
Poster advertising the international choral competition in Liège

- 24 January – Compagnie Maritime Belge founded
- 3 February – Marie-Thérèse Joniaux condemned to death for multiple poisonings
- 22 February – Touring Club Belgium founded
- 21 July – International choral competition in Liège opens
- 1 September – Royal Belgian Football Association founded
- 13 November – Lumière brothers demonstrate the cinematograph at the Physics Museum of the Catholic University of Leuven, one of the first such demonstrations outside France.
- 5 December – Founding committee of the Belgian Automobile Club holds first meeting in Taverne de la Régence, Place Royale, Brussels.

== Publications ==
Émile Verhaeren, Almanach, illustrated by Théo van Rysselberghe

Periodicals

- Le Vingtième Siècle begins publication
- Le Congo illustré ends publication

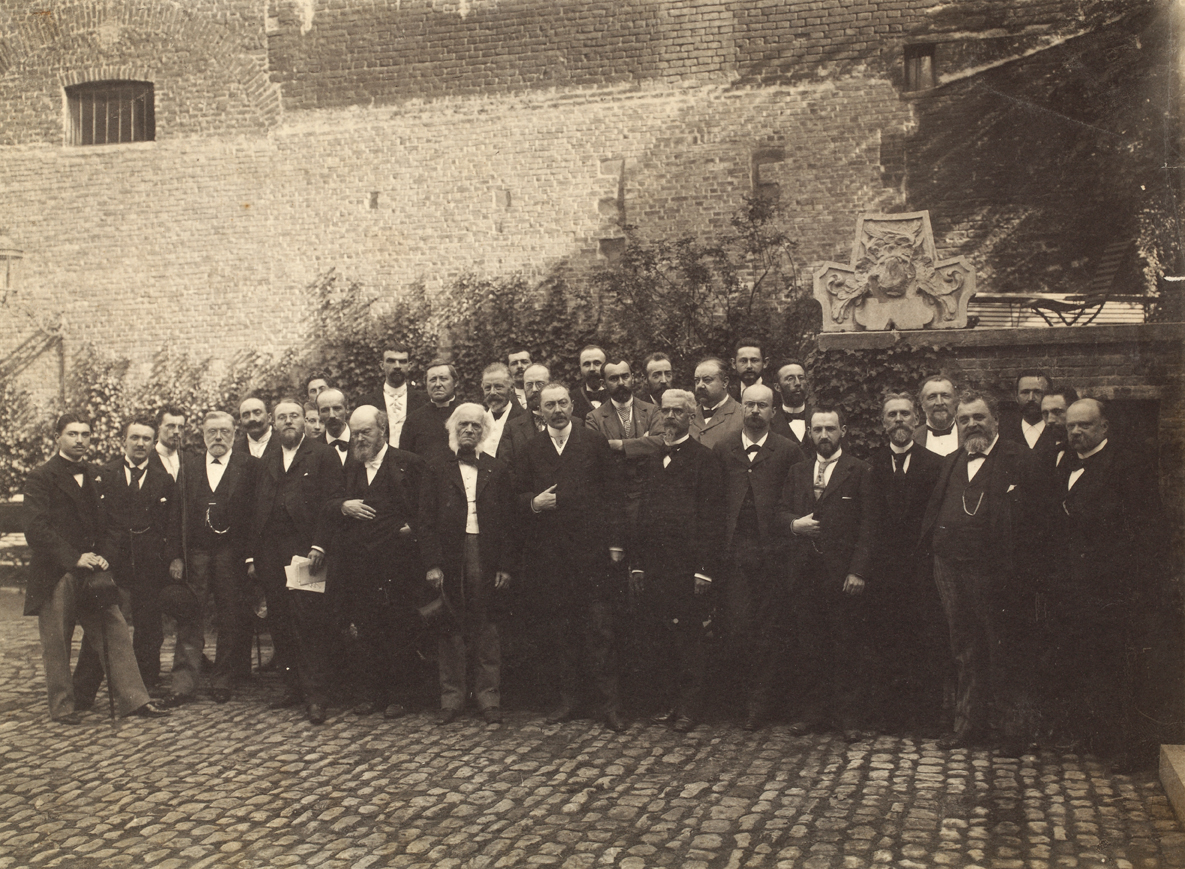
First International Conference of Bibliography, convened in Brussels by Henri La Fontaine and Paul Otlet, 1895

Scholarship

- Biographie Nationale de Belgique, vol. 13.
- Maurice De Wulf, Histoire de la Philosophie Scolastique dans les Pays-Bas et la Principauté de Liège, jusqu'à la Révolution française (Mémoires de l'Académie royale de Belgique 51).
- Henri La Fontaine and Paul Otlet, Conférence bibliographique internationale, Bruxelles, 1895: Documents (Brussels)
- Auguste Lameere, Manuel de la faune de Belgique: Animaux non insectes
- Edmond Marchal, La sculpture et les chefs-d'oeuvre de l'orfèvrerie belges (Brussels, F. Hayez)
- Édouard van den Corput, L'alcoolisme, l'hérédité et la question sociale (1895)

Literature

- Maurice Maeterlinck, Interior, premiered at the Théâtre de l'Œuvre, 15 March.
- Émile Verhaeren, Les villes tentaculaires (Brussels, Edmond Deman)
- Émile Verhaeren, Almanach, a collection of verse with illustrations by Théo van Rysselberghe

== Art and Architecture ==
Painting

- Prix de Rome: Jean Delville

Architecture

- Victor Horta, Hôtel van Eetvelde, built for Edmond van Eetvelde

== Births ==
- undated
  - Henri Smets, athlete (died 1994)
- 6 February – Jean-Pierre Vermetten, Olympic swimmer
- 13 February – Paul Nougé, poet (died 1967)
- 10 March
  - Mathieu Bragard, footballer (died 1952)
  - Jules Vanhevel, cyclist (died 1969)
- 9 April – Clément Doucet, pianist (died 1950)
- 19 April – Herman Roosdorp, racing driver (died 1965)
- 23 April – Robert Coppée, footballer (died 1970)
- 7 May – Adolphe Goemaere, Olympic sportsman (died 1970)
- 18 May – Herman de Gaiffier d'Hestroy, Olympic equestrian (died 1960)
- 28 May – Yvonne Hubert, pianist (died 1988)
- 5 June – August Baeyens, composer (died 1966)
- 25 June – Alice Frey, painter (died 1981)
- 24 July – Jozef Peeters, artist (died 1960)
- 17 August – Nicolas Lazarévitch, anarchist (died 1975)
- 19 August – François Demol, footballer (died 1966)
- 29 August – Jeanne Cappe, author (died 1956)
- 18 September – Constant Janssen, pharmaceutical entrepreneur (died 1970)
- 24 September – Frans De Haes, weightlifter (died 1923)
- 7 October – Maurice Grevisse, grammarian (died 1980)
- 21 October – Nand Geersens, broadcaster (died 1959)
- 25 October – Robert van Genechten, Dutch politician (died 1945)
- 11 November – Victor Soultanbeieff, chess master (died 1972)
- 14 November – Léopold Buffin de Chosal, pentathlete (died 1947)
- 25 November – Marcel Gustin, Olympic athlete (died 1977)
- 27 November – Eugène Gabriels, Olympic rower (died 1969)
- 29 November – Henri Liebaert, politician (died 1977)
- 30 December – August De Boodt, politician (died 1986)

== Deaths ==
- 29 January – Charles Soubre (born 1821), painter
- 8 February – Jean-François Portaels (born 1818), painter
- 24 May – Joseph Quinaux (born 1822), painter
- 16 June – Alfred van der Smissen (born 1823), general
- 15 September – Alfred Verwee (born 1838), painter
- 16 September – Alphonse Balat (born 1818), architect
- 17 November – Jean-Édouard Bommer (born 1829), botanist
