= 1893 in Belgium =

- Decades: 1870s; 1880s; 1890s; 1900s; 1910s
- See also: Other events of 1893; List of years in Belgium

Events in the year 1893 in Belgium.

== Incumbents ==
- Monarch - Leopold II
- Prime Minister: Auguste Marie François Beernaert

== Events ==
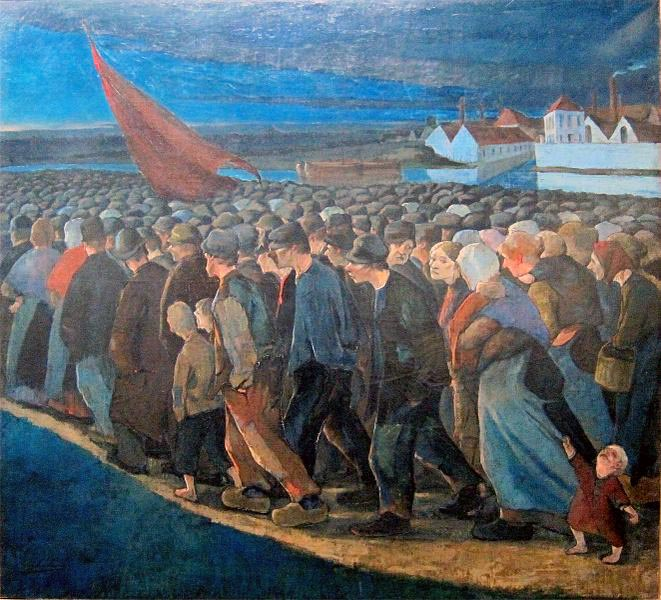
Eugène Laermans, Evening strike (1893)

- 12–18 April – general strike to demand universal manhood suffrage.
- 15 April – Social-Christian Christene Volkspartij founded
- 12 August – First Paris–Brussels road cycle race

== Publications ==
Periodicals

- Annuaire de la section d'art et d'enseignement de la maison du Peuple
- Van Nu en Straks begins publication

Reference and reports

- Biographie Nationale de Belgique, vol. 12.
- Chemins de fer, postes, télégraphes, téléphones et marine. Compte rendu des opérations pendant l'année 1892 (Brussels, J. Goemaere)
- Éléments d'enquête sur le rôle de la femme dans l'industrie, les oeuvres, les arts et les sciences en Belgique (Brussels, A. Lesigne)
- Uniforms of the Belgian Army (Brussels, Kiessling)
- Frans de Potter, Vlaamsche bibliographie: Lijst der boeken, vlug- en tijdschriften, muziekwerken, kaarten, platen en tabellen, in België van 1830 tot 1890 verschenen (Ghent, Alfons Siffer)
- Arthur Van Gehuchten, L'Anatomie du système nerveux de l'homme (Leuven)

Literature

- Cyriel Buysse, Het recht van de sterkste
- Guido Gezelle, Tijdkrans
- Prosper de Haulleville, Portraits et silhouettes, vol. 2
- Émile Verhaeren, Les campagnes hallucinées (Brussels, Edmond Deman)

== Art and architecture ==
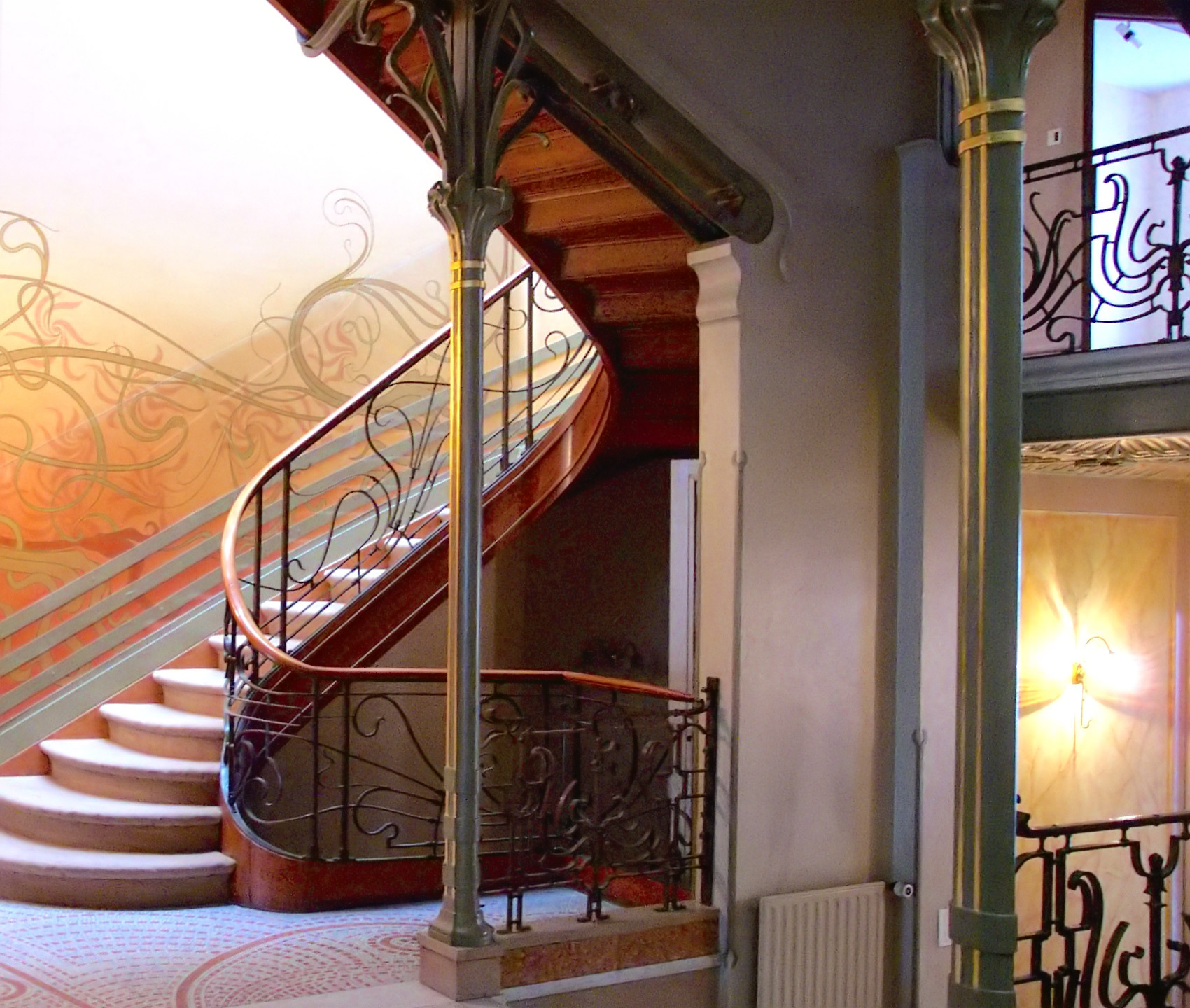
Stairway in the Hôtel Tassel

- Les XX disband
- La Libre Esthétique founded

Buildings

- Victor Horta, Hôtel Tassel completed

Paintings

- Eugène Laermans, Evening strike

Performances

- 17 May – Premiere of Maurice Maeterlinck's Pelléas et Mélisande

== Births ==
- 2 January – Félix Sellier, cyclist (died 1965)
- 12 January – Victor Lenaers, cyclist (died 1968)
- 20 February – Gabrielle Petit, patriot (died 1916)
- 23 March
  - Robert de Foy, head of the State Security Service (died 1960)
  - René Vermandel, cyclist (died 1958)
- 5 April – Joseph Lefèvre, archivist (died 1977)
- 4 September – Robert Poulet, writer (died 1989)
- 13 October – René Goormaghtigh, engineer (died 1960)
- 23 October – Jean Absil, composer (died 1974)
- 11 November – Paul van Zeeland, politician (died 1973)
- 9 December – Prosper Dezitter, collaborationist (died 1948)

== Deaths ==
- 23 January – Eugène-François de Block (born 1812), artist
- 27 January – Alfred Belpaire (born 1820), locomotive engineer
- 28 January – Gustave Léonard de Jonghe (born 1829), painter
- 24 May – Félix Nève (born 1816), Orientalist
- 6 June – Théodore Bernier (born 1843), antiquarian
- 11 July – Eugène Simonis (born 1810), sculptor
- 7 November – Constant Lievens (born 1856), Jesuit priest
- 20 November – Léopold Harzé (born 1831), sculptor
