= 1894 in Belgium =

- Decades: 1870s; 1880s; 1890s; 1900s; 1910s
- See also: Other events of 1894; List of years in Belgium

Events in the year 1894 in Belgium.

== Incumbents ==
- Monarch: Leopold II
- Prime Minister: Auguste Marie François Beernaert (until 26 March), Jules de Burlet (starting 26 March)

== Events ==
- February – Edouard Whettnall appointed ambassador to London.
- 25-26 March – Belgian Labour Party adopts the Charter of Quaregnon
- 5 May – Exposition Internationale d'Anvers opens (to 5 November)
- 12 May – Publication of an Anglo-Belgian Agreement leasing Bahr el Ghazal to the Congo Free State and a stretch of Congolese territory to the British. The exchange of territory was later rescinded under French and German pressure in the diplomatic build-up to the 1898 Fashoda Incident.
- 4-11 August – International congress of applied chemistry held in Brussels and Antwerp
- 14 October – First Belgian general election under universal manhood suffrage.
- 28 October – Provincial elections
- 5 November – Exposition Internationale d'Anvers ends.

== Art and architecture ==
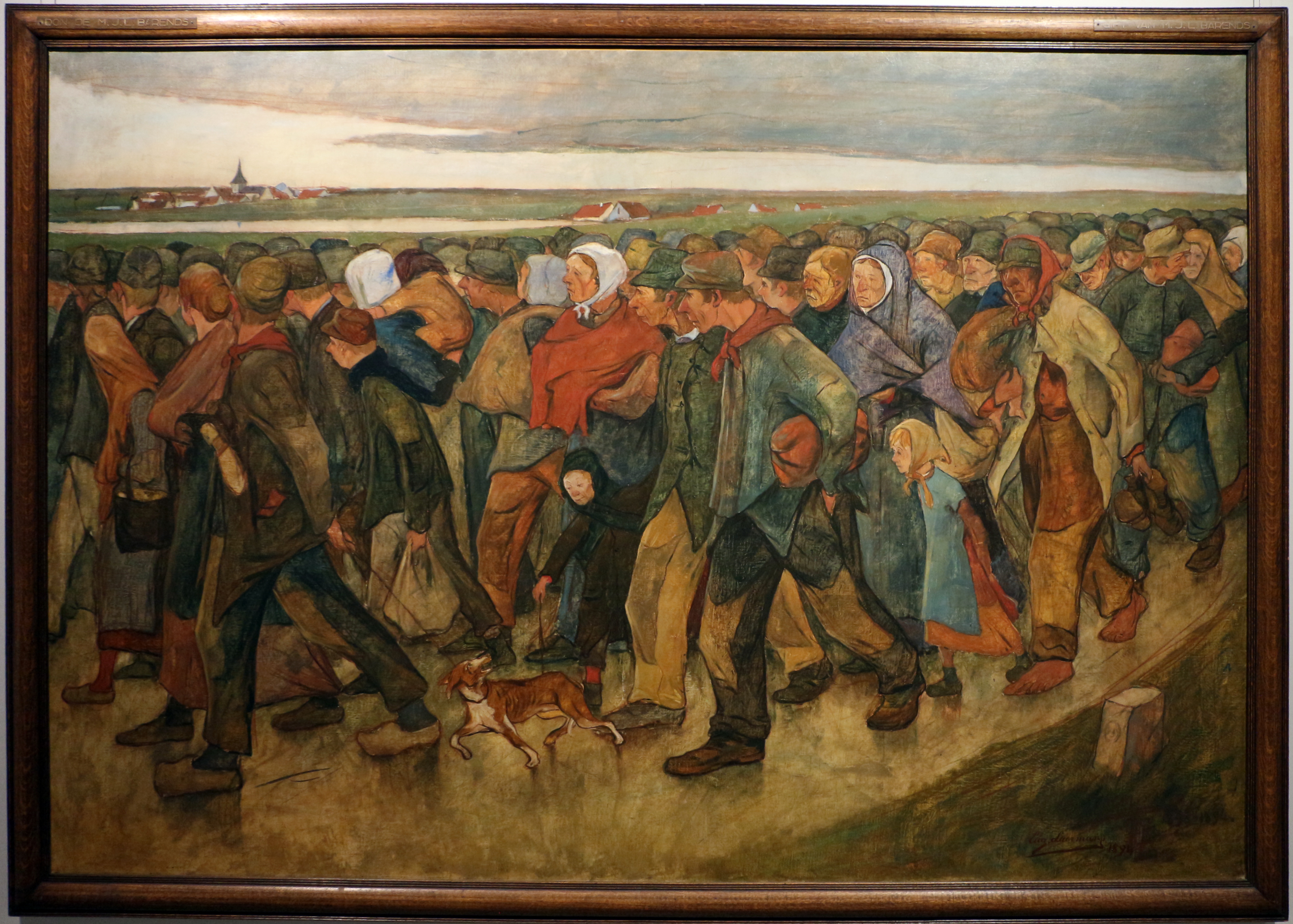
Eugène Laermans, The Emigrants (1894)

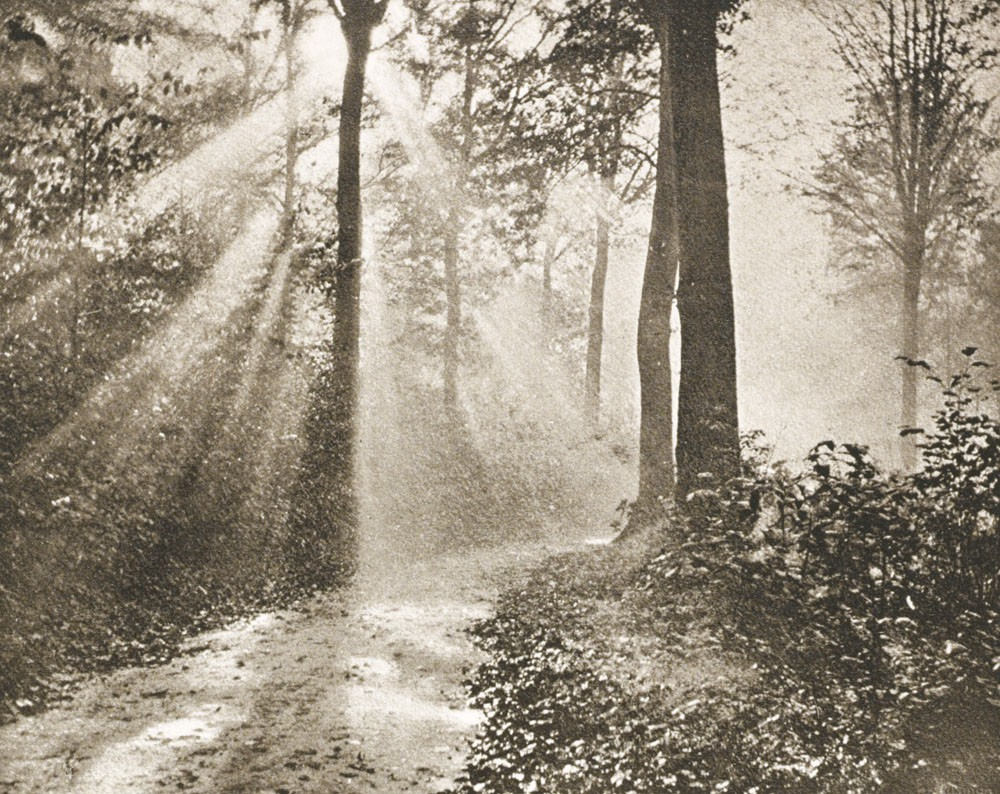
Édouard Hannon, Matinée d'Automne (1894)

Exhibitions

- 15 January to 13 February – Exhibition of antique lace at the Royal Academy of Fine Arts, Brussels.
- 17 February to 15 March – First exhibition of La Libre Esthétique in Brussels.

Paintings

- Eugène Laermans, The Emigrants
- Théo van Rysselberghe, Portrait of Irma Sèthe

Photography

- Édouard Hannon, Matinée d'Automne ("Autumn Morning")

== Publications ==
Periodicals

- Revue Néoscholastique begins publication.
- Durendal begins publication.

Other

- Alphonse Dubois, Faune des vertébrés de la Belgique: Série des oiseaux (Brussels, A la librairie C. Muquardt, Th. Falk Sr), vol. 2
- Maurice Maeterlinck, Alladine et Palomides, Interieur, et La mort de Tintagiles: trois petits drames pour marionnettes (Brussels, Edmond Deman)
- Max Rooses, Letterkundige studiën
- Edmond-Louis de Taeye, Les artistes belges contemporains

== Births ==
- 1 March — Marguerite Lefèvre, geographer (died 1967)
- 17 July – Georges Lemaître, physicist and astronomer (died 1966)

== Deaths ==
- 22 January – Hendrik Beyaert (born 1823), architect
- 4 February – Adolphe Sax (born 1814), inventor of the saxophone
- 27 April – Ernest Slingeneyer (born 1820), painter
- 18 June – Jean-Baptiste Bethune (born 1821), architect
- 15 August – Ernest Baert (born 1860), explorer
