= 1898 in Belgium =

- Decades: 1870s; 1880s; 1890s; 1900s; 1910s
- See also: Other events of 1898; List of years in Belgium

Events in the year 1898 in Belgium.

== Incumbents ==
- Monarch: Leopold II
- Prime Minister: Paul de Smet de Naeyer

== Events ==
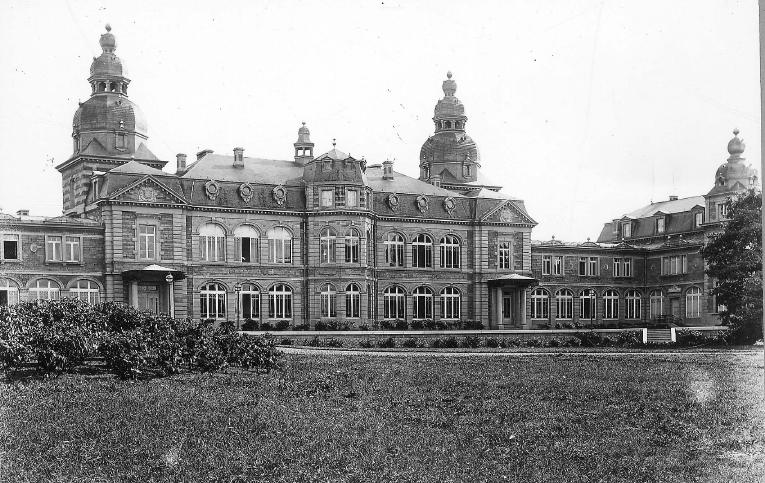
Luxury hotel Château royal d'Ardenne, opened 23 June 1898

- 18 April - Coremans-De Vriendt law gives Dutch and French equal legal status in Belgian public life.
- 22 May - Belgian general election, 1898
- 5 June – Provincial elections
- 23 June – Opening of the Château royal d'Ardenne as a luxury hotel run by the Compagnie Internationale des Grands Hotels.
- 13–17 July – Eleventh International Eucharistic Congress held in Brussels.
- 27 July – Anglo-Belgian Treaty of Commerce and Navigation comes to an end, due to notification of the United Kingdom's withdrawal a year earlier.

== Publications ==
- Léon Bloy, Mendiant ingrat (Brussels, Edmond Deman)
- J. Nyssens-Hart, The Outer Port and the Inner Port of Bruges (Brussels, A> Lesigne)
- Max Rooses (ed.), Het schildersboek: Nederlandsche schilders der negentiende eeuw, vol. 1, vol. 2.
- Emile Vandervelde, Le Socialisme en Belgique
- Émile Verhaeren, Les aubes (Brussels, Edmond Deman)

== Art and architecture ==
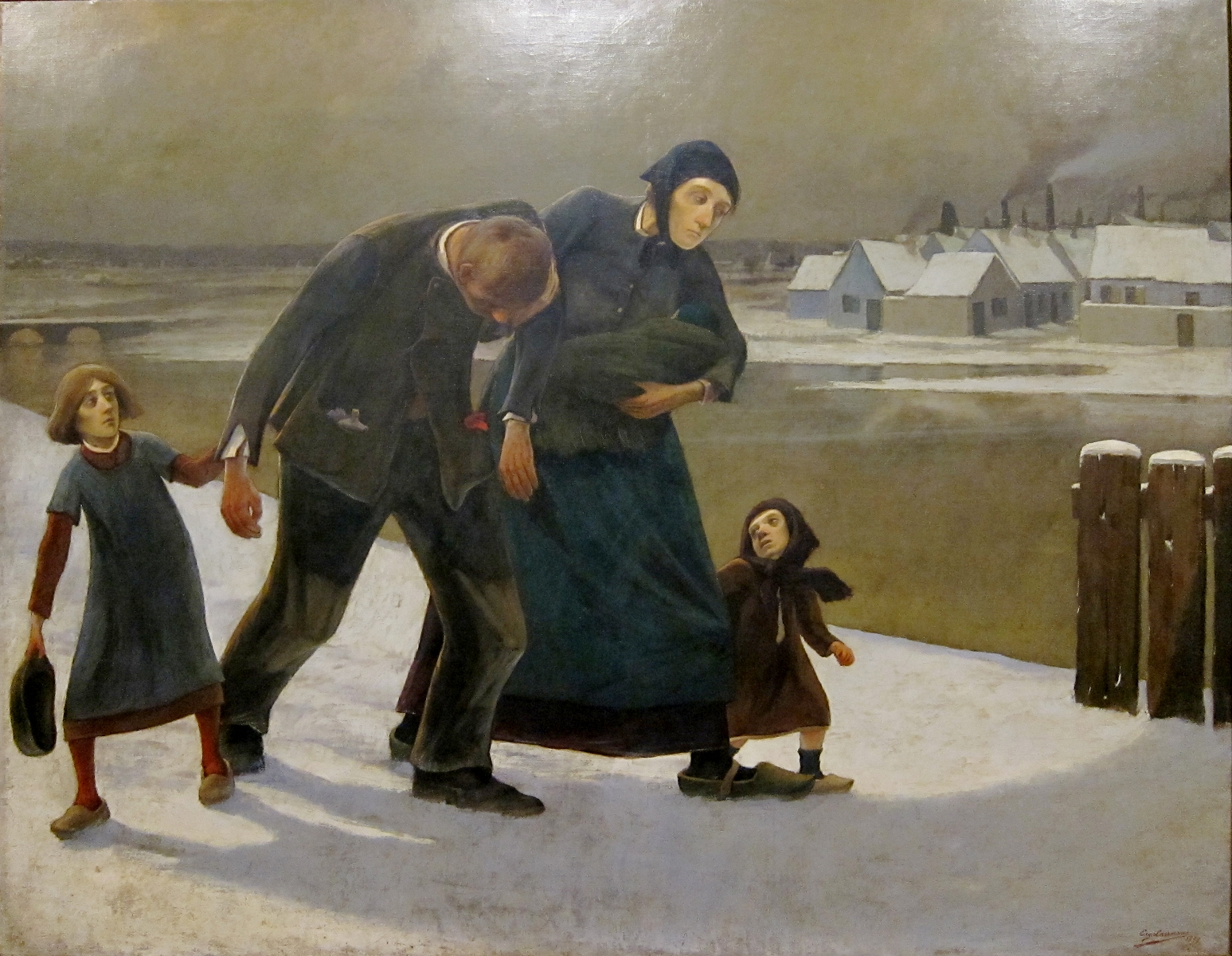
Eugène Laermans, The Drunkard (1898)

Paintings

- Eugène Laermans, The Drunkard

Buildings

- Victor Horta, Hôtel Solvay

== Births ==
- 8 February - André Fierens, footballer (d. 1972)
- 5 March – Lucien Leboutte, air chief (d. 1988)
- 17 March - Raymond Decorte, cyclist (d. 1972)
- 9 December – Marie-Louise Hénin, resister (d. 1944)

== Deaths ==
- 12 January – Jean Jules Linden (born 1817), botanist
- 14 January – Polydore de Keyser (born 1832), Lord Mayor of London
- 25 January – François Roffiaen (born 1820), painter
- 22 March – Pieter De Rudder (born 1822), labourer
- 25 April – Prosper de Haulleville (born 1830), newspaperman
- 1 May – Alphonse Wauters (born 1817), archivist
- 3 June – Emma De Vigne (born 1850), painter
- 9 June – Joseph Jaquet (born 1822), sculptor
- 13 July – Émile Banning (born 1836), government adviser
- 23 August – Félicien Rops (born 1833), illustrator
- 11 September – Adolphe Samuel (born 1824), composer
- 30 September – Léon Mignon (born 1847), sculptor
- 25 December – Georges Rodenbach (born 1855), author
