= 1892 in Belgium =

- Decades: 1870s; 1880s; 1890s; 1900s; 1910s
- See also: Other events of 1892; List of years in Belgium

Events in the year 1892 in Belgium.

== Incumbents ==
- Monarch: Leopold II
- Prime Minister: Auguste Marie François Beernaert

== Events ==
- 22 May – Provincial elections
- 14 June – Belgian general election, 1892

== Publications ==
- Iwan Gilkin, Ténèbres (Brussels, Edmond Deman)
- Prosper de Haulleville, Portraits et silhouettes, vol. 1
- Emile Vandervelde, Les associations professionelles d'artisans et d'ouvriers en Belgique

=== Periodicals ===
- Messager des sciences historiques

== Art and architecture ==
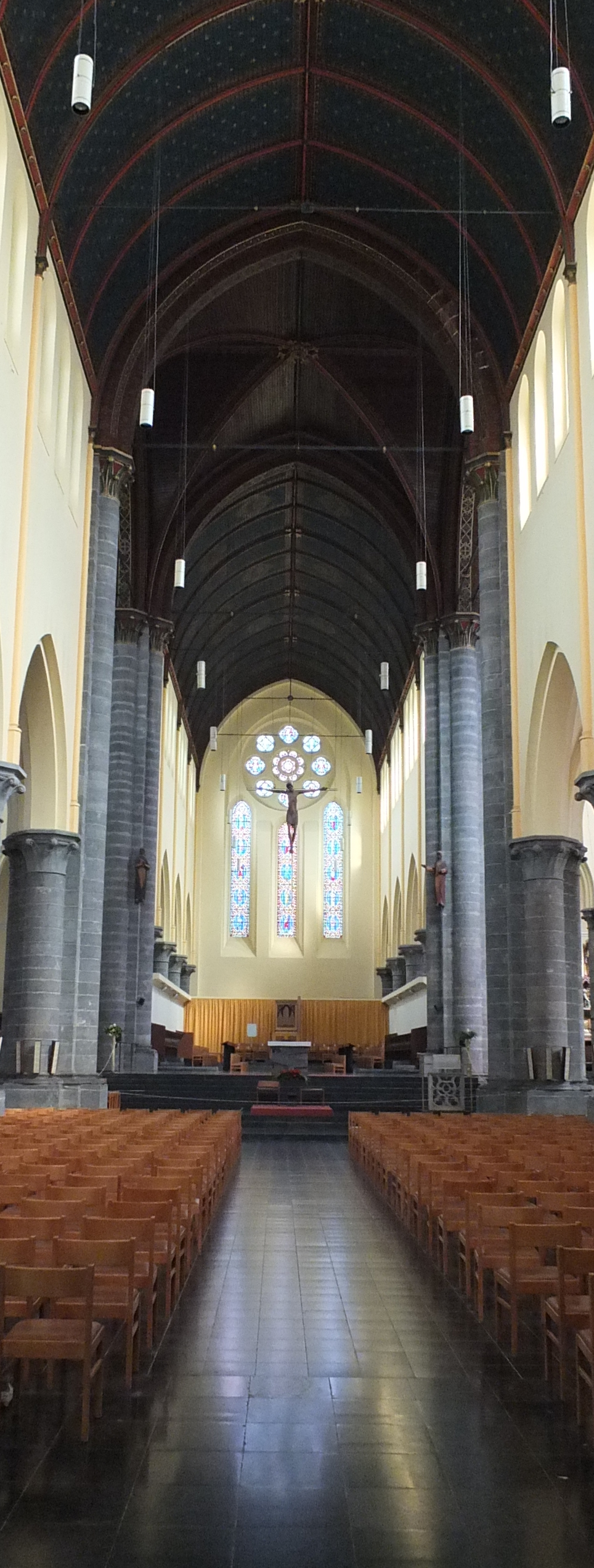
The interior of the church, Maredsous Abbey

Buildings

- Jean-Baptiste Bethune, Maredsous Abbey (begun 1872)

Paintings

- Théo van Rysselberghe, An Evening

== Births ==
- 28 October – Marthe Cnockaert, spy and writer (died 1966)

== Deaths ==
- 30 August – Lucien Bia (born 1852) soldier
