= Coche =

Coche, a Spanish word for automobile, can refer to:

- Coche people, an indigenous people of Colombia
- Camsá language, Coche language
- Coche Island, Venezuela
- Coche station, a rapid transit station in Caracas
- Coche d'eau, a horse-drawn water coach, also called Trekschuit
- Coche, Al-Mada'in, the name of an ancient urban complex along the Tigris River in Iraq
- Chantal Coché (1826 – 1891), Belgian industrialist
