= 1897 in Belgium =

- Decades: 1870s; 1880s; 1890s; 1900s; 1910s
- See also: Other events of 1897; List of years in Belgium

Events in the year 1897 in Belgium.

== Incumbents ==
- Monarch: Leopold II
- Prime Minister: Paul de Smet de Naeyer

== Events ==
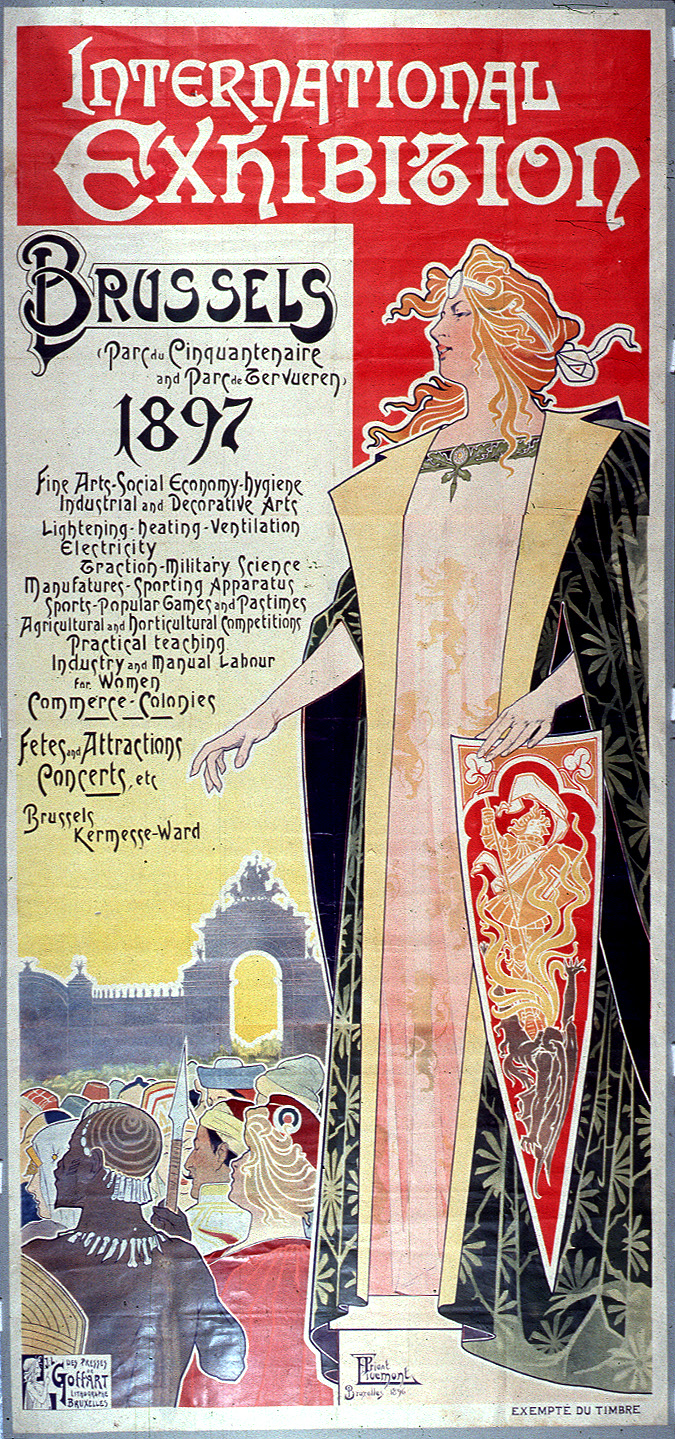
Poster advertising the Brussels International Exposition

- 10 May – Brussels International Exposition opens
- 28 July – Prime Minister of the United Kingdom gives notification of his country's intention to withdraw from the Anglo-Belgian Treaty of Commerce and Navigation (1862), to come into effect one year later.
- 16 August – Belgian Antarctic Expedition sets sail from Antwerp
- 8 November – Brussels International Exposition closes
- 16 December – Charles-Gustave Walravens appointed bishop of Tournai

== Publications ==
Exhibitions

- Camille Lemonnier, Alphonse Wauters, and Armand Heins, Le Palais de la ville de Bruxelles à l'Exposition universelle de 1897

Books

- Biographie Nationale de Belgique, vol. 14.
- Grant Allen, Cities of Belgium (London, G. Richards)
- Louis Cloquet, Les grandes cathédrales du monde catholique (Desclée De Brouwer)
- Guido Gezelle, Rijmsnoer
- Gustave Kahn, Limbes de lumières, illustrated by Georges Lemmen (Brussels, Edmond Deman)
- Désiré-Joseph Mercier, Les Origines de la psychologie contemporaine
- Emile Vandervelde, Le question agraire en Belgique

== Births ==
- 1 January – Albert De Vleeschauwer, politician (died 1971)
- 24 January – Fernand Ledoux, actor (died 1994)
- 29 January – Honoré Vlamynck, footballer (died 1974)
- 11 April – Paul Graeffe, bobsledder (died 1957)
- 7 May – Marcel Maas, pianist (died 1950)
- 11 May – Joris Minne, artist (died 1988)
- 2 June – Léon Trulin, intelligence agent (died 1915)
- 8 June – Domien Jacob, gymnast (died 1984)
- 19 June – Ernest Casimir-Lambert, bobsledder (died 1931)
- 1 August – Camil Van Hulse, pianist (died 1988)
- 25 August – Léoncé Oleffe, athlete (died 1972)
- 12 September – Albert Wyckmans, cyclist (died 1995)
- 4 November – Paul Finet, politician (died 1965)
- 5 November – Paul Kronacker, politician (died 1994)
- 24 November
  - Lode Craeybeckx, politician (died 1976)
  - Pierre Devaux, athlete (died 1984)
- 5 December – Gust De Muynck, broadcaster (died 1986)
- 18 December – Fernand Collin, banker (died 1990)

== Deaths ==
- 13 February – Gustave Den Duyts (born 1850), artist
- 1 March – Jules de Burlet (born 1844), politician
- 12 July – Félix Godefroid (born 1818), harpist
- 23 September – Isidore-Joseph du Rousseaux (born 1826), bishop of Tournai
- 22 November – Frans Verhas (born 1827), painter
