= 1896 in Belgium =

- Decades: 1870s; 1880s; 1890s; 1900s; 1910s
- See also: Other events of 1896; List of years in Belgium

Events in the year 1896 in Belgium.

== Incumbents ==
- Monarch: Leopold II
- Prime Minister: Jules de Burlet (until 25 February), Paul de Smet de Naeyer (from 25 February)

== Events ==
- 7 January – Official founding of the Belgian Automobile Club.
- 15 April – Law on the making and importation of alcohol replaces duty on the capacity of distillery equipment (adopted in 1833) with a duty on the proportional alcohol content of the distilled product.
- 25 April – Murder of Delphina-Angelica Borée in Brussels.
- 14 May – Parish of St Anthony of Padua established in newly expanded Heirnis section of Ghent.
- 5 July – Belgian general election, 1896
- 26 July – Provincial elections

== Publications ==
- Pol de Mont, Dit zijn Vlaamsche wondersprookjes
- Maurice De Wulf, Études Historiques sur l'Esthétique de Saint Thomas d'Aquin
- Maurice Maeterlinck, Le Trésor des humbles
- Édouard van den Corput, Bruxellensia: Croquis artistiques et historiques
- Emile Vandervelde, L'Evolution industrielle et le collectivisme
- Émile Verhaeren, Les heures claires (Brussels, Edmond Deman)

== Art and architecture ==
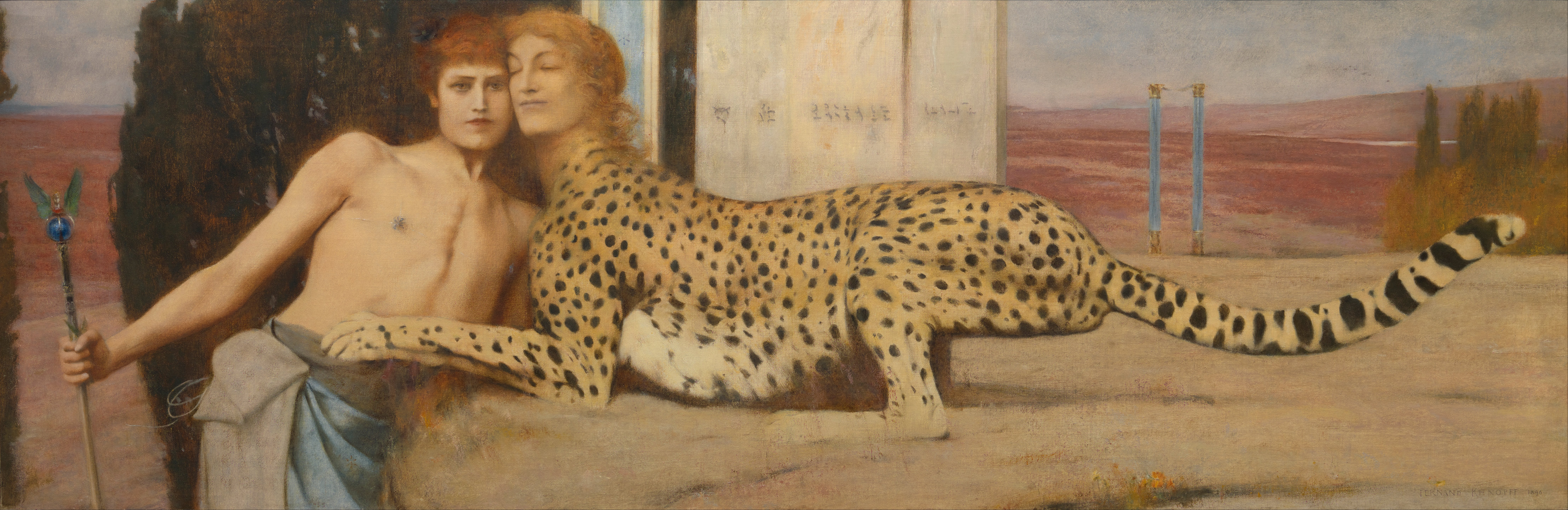
Fernand Khnopff, Caress of the Sphinx (Royal Museums of Fine Arts of Belgium)

Paintings

- Fernand Khnopff, Caress of the Sphinx

== Births ==
- 11 February – René Joannes-Powell, athlete (died 1940)
- 22 February – Paul van Ostaijen, poet (died 1928)
- 10 April – Jean-Baptiste Piron, soldier (died 1974)
- 14 August – Julien Lehouck, athlete (died 1944)
- 10 October – Omer Corteyn, athlete (died 1979)

== Deaths ==
- 2 January – Walthère Frère-Orban (born 1812), politician
- 9 January – Guillaume Vogels (born 1836), painter
- 6 February – Julie Dorus-Gras (born 1805), soprano
- 3 March – Constant de Deken (born 1852), missionary
- 6 May – Constantin Heger (born 1809), educator
- 7 June – Florent Crabeels (born 1829), painter
- 11 August – Xavier De Cock (born 1818), painter
- 9 December – Isidore de Stein d'Altenstein (born 1819), genealogist
- 13 December – Xavier de Theux de Meylandt et Montjardin (born 1838), bibliophile
