= Jeanne Hebbelynck =

Belgian artist

- Portrait of Jeanne Hebbelynck by Georges Guequier
- Born: Jeanne Dutry; 20 June 1891
- Died: 8 May 1959 (aged 67)
- Known for: Children's Book Illustration, Design
- Spouse: Léon Hebbelynck

Jeanne Hebbelynck (née Dutry, 20 June 1891 - 8 May 1959) was a Belgian artist, children's book illustrator, and designer whose major themes were Roman Catholicism and childhood. Her extensive works were primarily for publications in French, but some also appeared in Dutch and English. She was the only Belgian illustrator to be featured in a major international exhibition in Cologne in 1988 on "500 years of books for children".

== Family ==
Jeanne married Léon Hebbelynck (1878-1951) with whom she had three children: Jacques (1915-2003), Martine (1920-1942) and Geneviève (1923).

== Honours ==
Hebbelynck was made a dame of the Order of the Crown on 14 November 1936.

== Works ==
=== As author ===
- Quelques saintes de chez nous
- Madones au Pays de Flandre (1935), published in Dutch as Lieve Vrouwkes van Vlaanderen
- La Prière des Petits (1935), translated into Dutch as Het gebed der kleinen
- Le Petit Communiant (1950)
- Les Douzes Fruits du Saint-Esprit (1950)

=== As illustrator ===
Books that Hebbelynck illustrated include:

- Jeanne Cappe, Trois Histoires de Noël
- Camille Melloy, L'Ane de Bethléem, translated into Dutch as Het ezeltje van Bethlehem
- Stijn Streuvels, Het Kerstekind (1934), translated into French by Gauthier d'Ys as L'Enfant de Noël
- Jean Mallech, La légende de la Reine Astrid (1935)
- Camille Melloy, Cinq Contes de Noël, translated into Dutch by Stijn Streuvels as Vijf Kerstvertellingen; English adaptation by Joan Windham as The King's Christmas Present
- Marie van Zeggelen, Hoe Harlekijntje aan zijn pakje kwam (1938), translated into French by Gauthier d'Ys as Les Débuts d'Arlequin
- Marcelle Vérité, Petites Contes de Chez Nous (1938; reissued 1950)
- Elisabeth Wauters de Besterfeld, La Merveilleuse Histoire de la Sainte Vierge (1940; reissued 1950)
