= L'Escaut en amont d'Anvers, le soir =

1892 painting by Théo van Rysselberghe

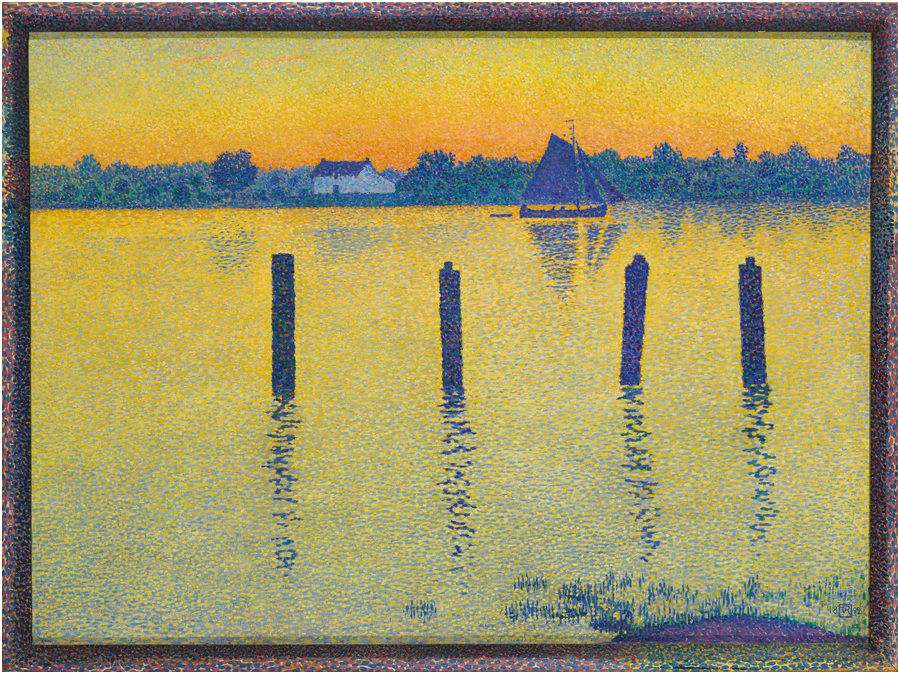
- Artist: Théo van Rysselberghe
- Year: 1892
- Medium: Oil on canvas
- Dimensions: 66.7 cm × 90.5 cm (26 1/4 in × 35 5/8 in)
- Location: Private collection; Unknown

L'Escaut en amont d'Anvers, le soir or An Evening is an oil on canvas painting by Belgian painter Théo van Rysselberghe. Painted in 1892, the painting is considered a very good example of Van Rysselberghe's pointillist technique, which, by the time he painted this oeuvre, had been completely absorbed and adjusted by the Belgian artist.

The painting was sold in June 2017 for 8,483,750 GBP (about $11,684,302.65 in 2020) at Sotheby's in London.

== Background ==
In 1884 Van Rysselberghe was one of the founders of the Neo-Impressionist group of Les XX. Van Rysselberghe was generally considered the leading artist of this group. He was close friends with artist Paul Signac (who was later inducted into the Les XX). Their friendship helped connect Van Rysselberghe's Les XX to Signac's Société des Artistes Indépendants.

Van Rysselberghe painted many waterscape paintings around 1890, among which is a portrait of Signac sailing on his boat and the Barques de pêche–Méditerranée (1892), painted during Van Rysselberghe and Signac's two-month excursion in le Midi aboard Signac's boat the Olympia ( named after Édouard Manet's painting). It was in this context that Van Ryselberghe realized L'Escaut en amont d'Anvers, le soir.

== Painting ==
In contrast to his travelling companion and friend Signac, Van Rysselberghe was keen on permeating his paintings with atmosphere and animation. In L'Escaut en amont d'Anvers, le soir, or Evening, there is a remarkable and yet pleasingly measured contrast of yellow and orange against purple and blue. When compared to Signac's similar paintings from that period, Van Rysselberghe's painting has been described as having a heightened contrast, as well as being "more intimate and contemplative." Cornelia Homburg wrote about the painting:

Théo van Rysselberghe employed a rather daring, restricted color scheme in some of his compositions in order to evoke a mood. […] purple and yellow could be used to produce Big Clouds [1893 painting by Van Rysselberghe] or to create a very different impact in The Scheldt Upstream from Antwerp, Evening. This evening scene, with its intense hues, invites us to lose ourselves in reverie. The anchor poles and their reflection in the water provide a gentle rhythm to the composition, while the sailboat's calm path underlines the evocative atmosphere.

Robert Harper wrote about this work:

The unusual simplicity of the seascape is a mark of the period 1892-1894, his [Van Rysselberghe's] best in landscape. [The present work] has a strong yellow that comes from a moist, but sunlit afternoon, forcefully opposed to lavender and blue, and each shares a Belgian penchant for limiting the surface to very few planes.

After having been exhibited in museums such as the Metropolitan Museum of Art, the Musée d'Orsay, and the Phillips Collection, and being held for about fifty years in the private collection of American banker Arthur G. Altschul, the painting was sold in June 2017 for 8,483,750 GBP (about $11,684,302.65 in 2020) at Sotheby's, in London, to an unknown buyer.

== Sources ==
- Les Expositions, Autour de Seurat, in Connaissance des Arts, Paris, 15 June 1954, p. 74

Jean Sutter, Les Néo-Impressionnistes, Paris & Neuchâtel, 1970, illustrated p. 207

- Richard Shone, The Post-Impressionists, London, 1979, no. 179, illustrated p. 155
- Serge Goyens de Heusch, L'impressionnisme et le fauvisme en Belgique, Antwerp, 1988, illustrated in colour p. 197
- Théo van Rysselberghe, neo impressionniste (exhibition catalogue), Musée des Beaux-Arts, Ghent, 1993, no. 42, illustrated p. 102
- Ronald Feltkamp, Théo van Rysselberghe, Catalogue raisonné, Brussels, 2003, no. 1892–009, illustrated p. 294; illustrated in colour p. 14
- Pierre Sanchez, Le Salon des 'XX' et de la Libre Esthétique, Bruxelles 1884–1914, Dijon, 2012, listed p. 389
