= Andries Mac Leod =

Belgian-Swedish philosopher and mathematician (1891-1977)

Andries Hugo Donald Mac Leod (10 August 1891 – 28 March 1977) was a Belgian-Swedish philosopher and mathematician.

Andries Mac Leod was born in Ledeberg, a suburb of Ghent, as a son of Julius Mac Leod, a botanist and professor at Ghent University, and of Fanny Mac Leod born Maertens, who was translator from English into Dutch of two books by Kropotkin.

While Mac Leod was attending the atheneum in Ghent, he already got interested in philosophy and he was one of the founders of a Wijsgerige Kring (philosophical circle) there. One of the other members of this circle was Marcel Minnaert, with whom he maintained a lifelong friendship.

Mac Leod studied mathematics and physics at Ghent University, where he obtained his doctorate in July 1914 by submitting a thesis on a problem in fluid mechanics (which appeared later as Mac Leod 1923). Immediately afterwards he travelled for holidays to Lapland in Sweden. There he learnt that the German army had invaded Belgium on 4 August 1914. He decided to stay in Sweden. He got a job in the large mathematical library of Gösta Mittag-Leffler in Djursholm near Stockholm. He also attended the seminars of the philosopher Adolph Phalén at Uppsala University. He was deeply impressed by Phalén's work.

In 1921 Mac Leod returned to Belgium, where he became a high school teacher in mathematics and physics, first in Diest and later in Ghent. In 1922 he married with Gunhild Sahlén, whom he had met during his stay in Sweden. In that year also his first book appeared, an introduction to non-Euclidean geometry (Mac Leod 1922). In 1927 his first philosophical monograph (Mac Leod 1927) was published.

In February 1939 he moved with his wife to Sweden, where he would stay during the rest of his life, devoting all his time to philosophical research on fundamental ontological and epistemological questions. Notably he published two lengthy philosophical monographs in Swedish (Mac Leod 1960, Mac Leod 1972). In 1960 he got an honorary doctorate at Uppsala University and a few years later he was honoured with a Festschrift (Henschen-Dahlquist 1966).

== Publications ==
- Mac Leod, A. (1922), Introduction à la géometrie non-euclidienne, Paris: J. Hermann, p. 433, JFM 48.0633.03
- Mac Leod, A. (1923), "Over een geval van wenteling eener ideale vloeistof, waarbij negatieve drukkingen optreden" [On a case of rotation of an ideal fluid, where negative pressures occur], Wis- en Natuurkundig Tijdschrift (in Dutch), 2: 22–60
- Mac Leod, A. (1927), Sur diverses questions se présentant dans l'étude du concept de réalité, Paris: J. Hermann, p. 239
- Mac Leod, A. (1960), Beskaffenhet och innehåll av ett medvetande [The nature and content of a consciousness] (in Swedish), Uppsala: Kungl. Humanistiska Vetenskaps-Samfundet, p. 569
- Mac Leod, A. (1972), Verklighet och negation [Reality and negation] (in Swedish), Stockholm and Uppsala: Almqvist & Wiksell, p. 1324
