= Prosper Dezitter =

Belgian Nazi collaborator (1893–1948)

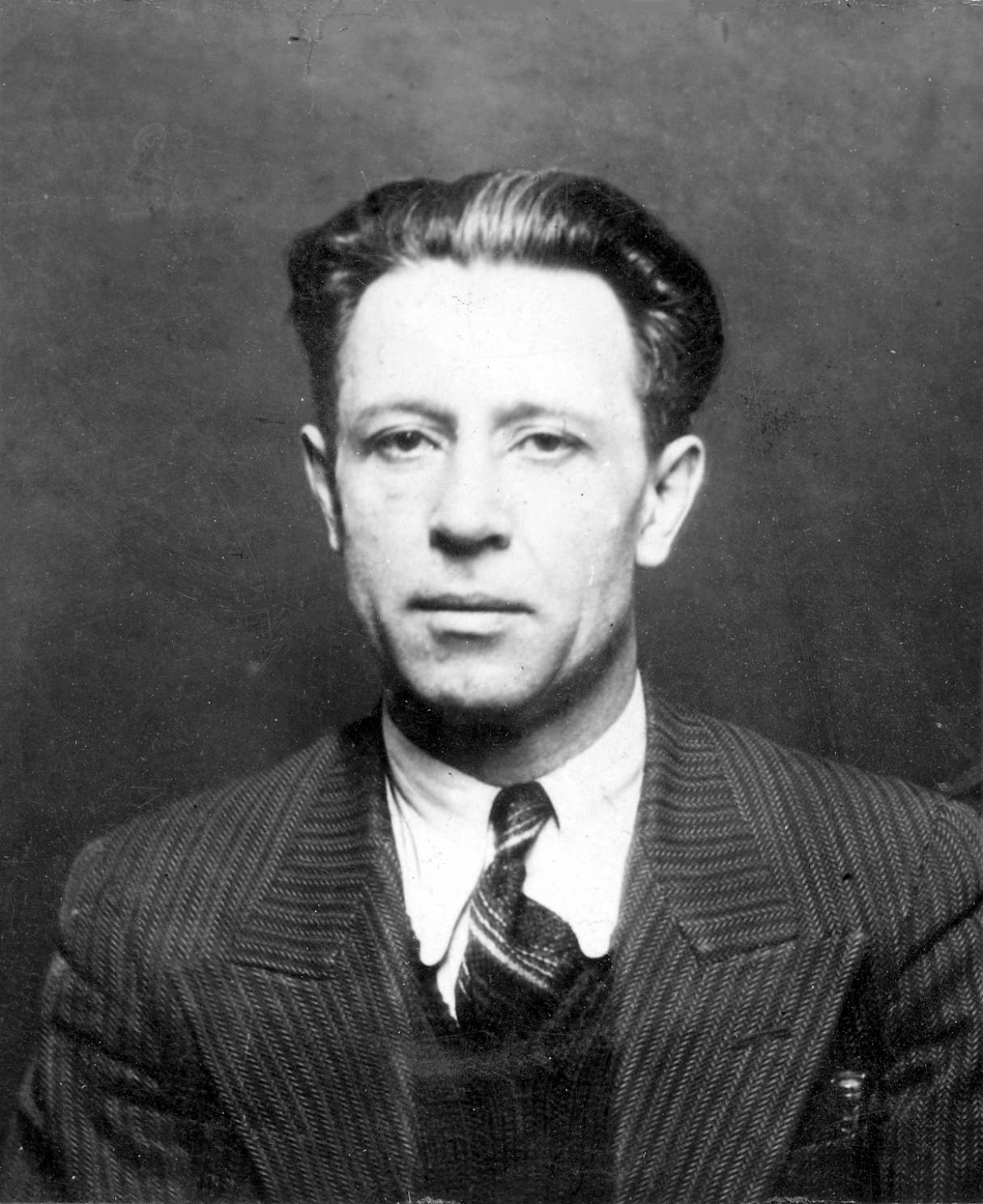
- Born: 19 September 1893; Passendale, Belgium
- Died: 17 September 1948 (aged 54); Ixelles, Belgium
- Other names: Prosper de Zitter; "the man with the missing finger"
- Known for: Nazi infiltrator
- Status: Executed by firing squad
- Conviction: Treason
- Penalty: Death

Prosper Dezitter, also known as Prosper de Zitter, alias "the man with the missing finger" (19 September 1893 – 17 September 1948) was a Belgian collaborator with Nazi Germany during World War II.

Dezitter was born in Passendale on 19 September 1893. In May 1913 he fled to Canada after being convicted of rape and sentenced to three years in prison. In 1918, he briefly joined the newly formed Royal Air Force, but his enlistment ended after a few months with the ending of World War I. He returned to Belgium in 1926, where he worked as a car salesman, but spent six years in prison for embezzlement and escroqueries au marriage - "marriage fraud".

During the German occupation of Belgium during World War II, Dezitter was able to pose as a Royal Canadian Air Force airman on the run. Calling himself "Captain Jackson" he infiltrated a resistance group led by Marcel Demonceau. He also ran an escape line for downed allied airmen, which was in reality a ruse to capture them and members of the resistance. Dezitter worked for money, and was paid a bonus for each Allied flier he helped capture.

After World War II, Dezitter was arrested in Germany, extradited to Belgium, and condemned to death. He was executed at Ixelles on 17 September 1948.

The National Archives in London hold two files of papers on Dezitter, reference KV 2/1732 and KV 2/1733.
