= François Demol =

Belgian footballer and manager

Frans Demol
Personal information
- Full name: Frans Laurent Demol
- Date of birth: 19 August 1895
- Place of birth: Beersel, Belgium
- Date of death: 14 February 1966 (aged 70)
- Position: Left back

Youth career
- 1907–1913: Union Saint-Gilloise

Senior career*
Years	Team	Apps	(Gls)
1913–1927	Union Saint-Gilloise	176	(19)

International career
1924–1927	Belgium	19	(0)

Managerial career
- 1927–1939: RC Tienen
- 1944–1946: Belgium
- 1946–1947: RC Tienen
- * Club domestic league appearances and goals

Frans Demol (19 August 1895 in Beersel – 14 February 1966), nicknamed Protje, was a former Belgian international footballer and manager of Belgium.

== Playing career ==
Having starting his youth career in Union Saint-Gilloise, Demol played also for Union's first squad from 1914 on. In his first professional year, he would already lift the Belgian Cup. With the same team (in the meantime named Union Royale Saint-Gilloise), he also won the Belgian Championship for clubs nine years later. In 1927, he changed Union after 176 games and 19 goals for Third Division team RC Tienen as coach, with which he celebrated promotion to Second Division in 1931.

During his last years in First Division with Union Royale Saint-Gilloise, he also gathered 19 caps for the Belgium national football team. He also got selected for the Belgian 1924 Olympic team, but did not play in Paris.

== Managerial career ==
Frans Demol became a football manager in 1927 for RC Tienen and in 1944 for Belgium. Under his supervision the national side won twice, drew twice and suffered four losses. In 1946, Englishman Bill Gormlie became his successor as coach of Belgium. Just as for his player career, Demol's career as football manager ended up in Tienen; he would lead this team during only one year.

== Player palmares ==
Union Saint-Gilloise

- Belgian First Division

Winner (1): 1922–23

- Belgian Cup

Winner (1): 1914

RC Tienen

- Belgian Third Division

Winner (1): 1931

- Belgian Second Division

Winner (1): 1937

Belgium national football team

- 19 selections
- Coupe Van den Abeele (friendly cup tournament between Belgium and the Netherlands in Belgium)

Winner (1): 1927
Co-Winner (1): 1926
