= Caroline Boussart =

Belgian feminist, journalist and managing director

Caroline Boussart (12 December 1808, Binche - 2 December 1891, Bruges) was a Belgian feminist, journalist, and managing director.

Boussart founded the newspaper Journal de Bruges, with her husband, the map maker and editor, Philippe Christian Popp, which she managed from 1837 to 1891. She was its publication director for half a century. She is regarded as a pioneer for her sex in Belgian media.

== Biography ==
When Caroline was a child, her father, Félix Boussart, was imprisoned at Trnava after the surrender of Dresden in 1813. He died the following year at the House of the Invalids in Pest (Maison des Invalides de Pest). On her mother, originally from Abbeville in Northern France, she was related to the famous navigator Picot (Baron of La Peyrouse), to the painter François Picot and to the poet Millevoye. She married Philippe Christian Popp, with whom she had eight children.

Fascinated by Brugge, she desired to restore her adopted city to its prior splendor, which it lost following the silting of the Zwin in the Middle Ages as the once vibrant city port stopped its activities. In her work, she fought for fiscal reforms, the creation of railways, the adopting of steam engines in factories; she strived to end the death penalty and poverty in Flanders. With her husband, Philippe Christian Popp, she headed the newspaper Journal de Bruges, at N°1 Woensdagmarkt in Brugge. The first edition was released on April 4, 1837. The newspaper would continue with two of her daughters, Antoinette and Nelly Popp.

From the 12 October 1862 until 28 December 1890, Caroline also wrote the "Brugge letters" (les lettres brugeoises) in the Office de publicité under the pseudonym "Charles." She collaborated as well with Illustrated Belgium (Belgique illustré), Belgian Illustration, European Illustration, Globe, and the European Express. Having been born in Binche, she had a good knowledge of the medieval city, which she used to inform her writing in Flemish Tales and Legends (Récit et Légendes des Flandres). This woman of letters was similar to George Sand as they both belonged to the liberalism movement, in particular with her promotion railways or campaigning for the abolition of taxes.

Caroline also supported development of Blankenberge. She found beauty in Coq-sur-Mer where the writer Jean d'Ardenne would later live. Victor Hugo invited her on 18 August 1871, along with her husband and one of their daughters, to visit him in exile at his house in Pont de Vianden, while the journalist Jean d'Ardenne stayed there from August 17 to 19. On August 22, V. Hugo left Vianden and accompanied Caroline Popp on excursions, as noted in Choses vu (August 22, 1871). She encouraged both poets Georges Rodenbach and Émile Verhaeren in their work. During the summer of 1884, she lodged Georges Rodenbach at her home.

== Bibliography ==
- Nathalie, souvenir de Blankenberghe, Bruxelles, A. N. Lebègue et Cie, 1861, in-8° de 40 pages. (Nouvelle couronnée au concours de la Société d'émulation de Liège).
- Récits et Légendes des Flandres [archive], Bruxelles, A. N. Lebègue et Cie, 1867, in-8° de 300 pages. (Le Pavillon de chasse d'Uytkerke; Ic hou de Brouck; Nathalie, Souvenir de Blankenberghe; Les cinq anneaux; Légende de la dentelle; Jantje Van Sluis; Bruges Souterrain)
- La Légende de la dentelle, Soc. anon. brugeoise d'imprimerie et de publicité, Bruges, 1867.
- Contes et nouvelles (1880)
- Paysages flamands et wallons (1887)
- Caroline Popp, Préface et choix de textes par A. Daxhelet, Anthologie des Écrivains Belges de langue française, Dechenne, Bruxelles, 1909.

== Sources ==
- Olivier Salazar-Ferrer, « Jean d'Ardenne et Victor Hugo », L'Echo Hugo (Paris), n^{o} 4, 2004, 61–67.
- Article "Popp", Biographie Belge, Académie Royale de Belgique.
- André Vanhoutryve, Journal de Bruges. Een Franstalige, Brugse, conservatieve, liberale krant. Met een herdruk van 'La Tête de Fer' van Caroline Popp, Zwevezele, 2002.
- Denise De Weerdt, En de vrouwen?, Masereelfonds, Brussel, 1980 (p. 33-34)
- Éliane Gubin (2006) (French). Dictionnaire des femmes belges: XIXe et XXe siècles. Lannoo Uitgeveri. ISBN 9782873864347
