= Marie-Thérèse Joniaux =

Belgian serial killer

- Born: Maria Teresa Joséphe Ablaÿ; October 15, 1844; Mechelen, Belgium
- Died: 1923 (aged 78–79); Antwerp, Belgium
- Conviction: Murder
- Penalty: Death; commuted to life imprisonment

Details
- Victims: 3
- Span of crimes: 1894–1895
- Country: Belgium

Marie-Thérèse Joniaux (née Maria Teresa Joséphe Ablaÿ; October 15, 1844 – 1923) was a Belgian poisoner who made headlines in 1894–1895 as part of the Joniaux Affair after the triple poisoning she perpetrated against her sister, Léonie Ablaÿ, her uncle-by-marriage, Jacques Van de Kerkhove and her brother, Alfred Ablaÿ. She was sentenced to death on February 3, 1895. Her death sentence was later commuted to life imprisonment, and she died in Antwerp in 1923.

== Early life ==
Marie Ablaÿ was born in Mechelen on October 15, 1844, into a family from Mons that included many high-ranking soldiers in the early 19th century. Her father, Jules-Gustave Ablaÿ, followed the family tradition and became a Lieutenant-General and the King's aide-de-camp. Her uncles Omer and Narcisse were also generals in the fledgling Belgian army. Her mother, Thérèse de Ryckman de Betz, gave birth to six children; as the eldest and "with the liveliest intelligence," Marie-Thérèse is said to have been her father's favourite child.

== Marriages ==
At age 24, Ablaÿ decided to marry; on July 10, 1869, she married Frédéric Faber, a well-known bibliophile on the Grand Place in Brussels who was often absorbed in his research and publishing his opuscules. On February 3, 1871, a child was born from this union: Jeanne Faber. But the new parents did not get along, as Faber, an intellectual focused on his research, and Ablaÿ devoted considerable energy to maintaining a social standing befitting of her rank. Faber died on December 4, 1884, in circumstances that were considered suspicious. Having respected the period of widowhood as prescribed, Ablaÿ married a second husband: Henri Joniaux, the widower of Ida Dumon, with whom he had three children: Marguerite, Marthe, and Charles. He was a Chief Engineer and First Class Director at the Bridges Department.

== Indebtedness ==
The couple soon settled into a luxurious townhouse, at 33 Nerviers Street off Boulevard Léopold in Antwerp. Her first marriage had left Ablaÿ with many mortgage-related and unsecured debts. Real-estate sales wiped out the first, but Ablaÿ still owed a portion of the second. Their daughter Jeanne, although still a minor, inherited a comfortable amount from her father, which was later stolen by her mother.

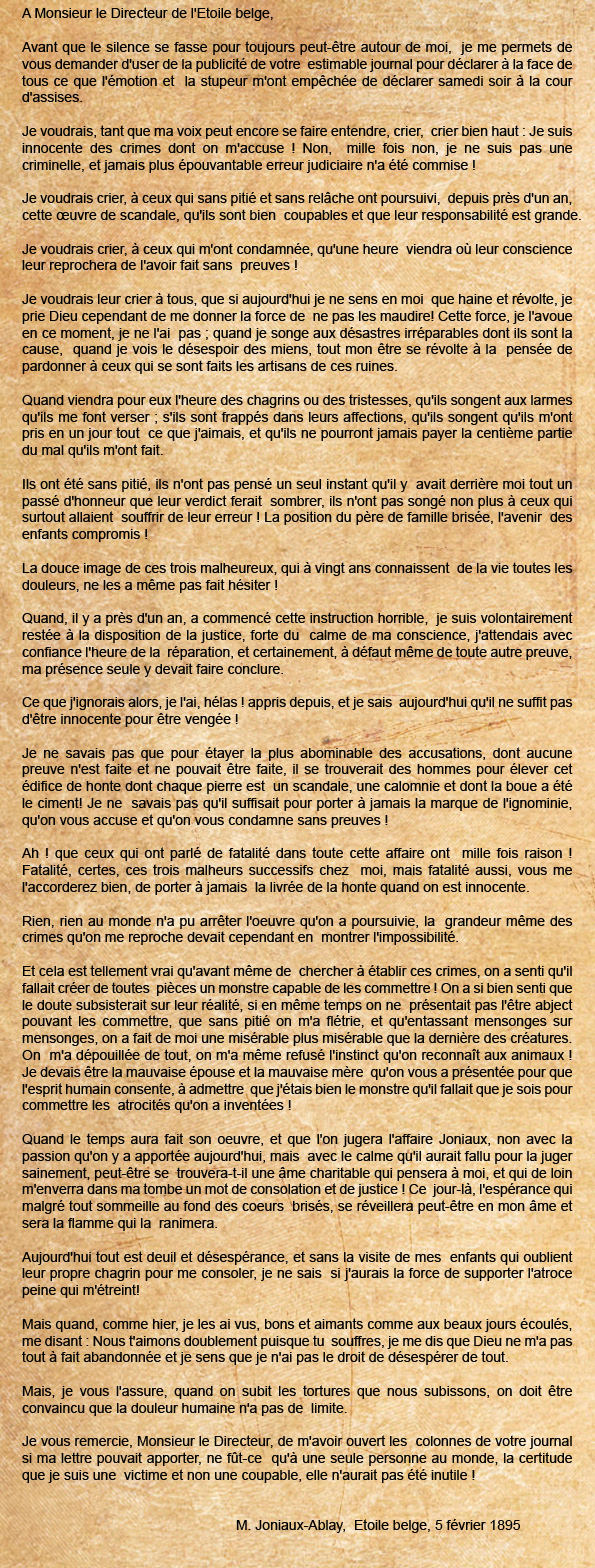
On February 5, 1895, she sent a letter to the newspaper Étoile belge through her lawyer.

Coming from a wealthy family, Ablaÿ had no intention of living a modest life. She tried to find money through honest legal ways, but eventually turned to illegal means to support her lifestyle. She flagrantly cheated on her husband in Brussels and Spa, but fiercely denied it. She resorted to a pawnshop and sometimes for derisory amounts (75 Belgian francs). (Note: An employee that earns 2300 Belgian francs per year)

On May 11, 1888, she obtained a loan from her mother-in-law of 30,000 Belgian francs as the result of one of the thousands of missives she wrote to her, imploring her, saying that "we will have a catastrophe if you cannot do anything", implying that her son, out of disappointment, would put an end to his days. The assets of her daughter, Jeanne Faber, came in guarantee and the act was executed on May 29, 1888. On June 1, 1888, she returned to a pawnshop to deposit silver for a fee of 140 Belgian francs. On August 31, 1888, a watch and a pin of her husband had expired a year earlier; she was unable to redeem them and had to renew her commitment. The 30,000 Belgian francs were used to repay the most virulent creditors. However, the persuasive Ablaÿ knew how to extract money from her family and acquaintances. She began to plan her ploys. There was one that she was particularly fond of at this time: claiming she had to pay off a debt contracted by a family member to spare the family honor. In early 1890, she embarked on another lucrative activity: she became a blackmailer and sent anonymous letters threatening to stigmatize those who did not comply with her financial demands. She tried to blackmail the in-laws of her brother's son Lionel, who was found dead on the edge of a pond in Lubbeek, on October 26, 1890.

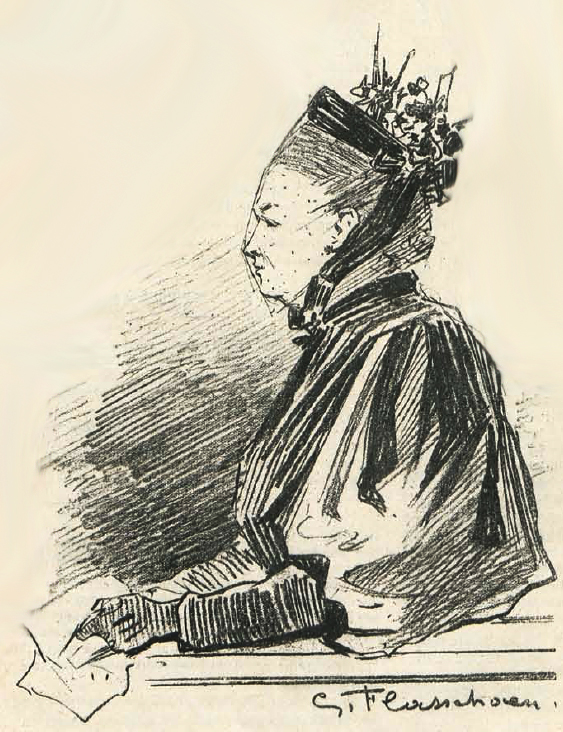
Marie-Thérèse Joniaux during her trial in January 1895 published in L'Illustration of January 12, 1895

In January 1892, Jeanne Faber married Oswald Mertens. Marie-Thérèse Joniaux could not imagine a marriage without luxury. Her financial situation was overburdened, and she saw no way out. She took out a life-insurance policy on her sister Léonie for an amount of 70,000 Belgian francs from two insurance companies. She pretended it as a financial operation and did not give any details. Léonie, attracted by the preparations of Jeanne's nuptials, moved to live with her sister in Antwerp. Her health began to decline, and doctors assumed she was suffering from typhus. The first doctor was called at 2:00 am on February 24, 1892. Insurers processes and closed the insurance policies in March and in April 1892. Marie-Thérèse Joniaux then went on holiday in Monaco and Italy.

She settled some debts but in October and November, she was again at a financial loss. One evening, Joniaux's uncle, Jacques Van de Kerkhove, came to a family dinner. After eating his meal, he said he felt ill and went to bed; the next day he died at around 11 am. Doctors speculated that he had cerebral apoplexy. Her husband inherited the money, but Joniaux needed fresh and directly accessible cash. She then proposed to her son-in-law that he allow her to take out a loan of 25,000 Belgian francs by agreeing to put her properties up as the guarantee. In return for the trouble, he would receive a brokerage of 5,000 Belgian francs. It was short-lived and in June 1893 she was again in distress.

In June 1893, she engaged in a new type of transaction, demonstrating the desperate nature of finding money. She bought a credit for 900 Belgian francs of silverware from a jeweler and immediately pawned it at the mount of piety. She reiterated that tactic with two other jewelers in January and in February 1894. The instruction later recognized the underlying gestures.

== Joniaux affair ==
On February 4, 1894, her brother, a former cavalry captain, was forced to resign due to financial misfortune. A widower since 1871, he settled in Paris where he had a relationship with a mistress, Marie Roguet, and was attracted to Antwerp by his sister. He had just lost his job in Paris and planned to ask for alimony from his son, Georges. Alfred was jobless in Paris until he found a job as a bookkeeper. He also benefited from a small supplementary pension paid by his mother-in-law, Madame Meskens. He lost his job again, and called his sister who said that she wanted to help him. She offered to pay him an annuity in exchange for a life-insurance policy worth 100,000 Belgian francs, of which she would be the beneficiary. He contacted a company in Paris but the conditions did not satisfy Joniaux, because of the high monthly payments. He arrived in Belgium, and his sister took things into her hands, contacting a London company named Gresham who had a seat in Antwerp. On February 17, 1894, the policy was underwritten and the first quarterly premium was paid by Joniaux. She explained to the insurers that this was to cover important advances that she made to her brother and that she wanted to protect her children. Alfred Ablay died at his sister's house on the night of March 5 or 6, 1894.

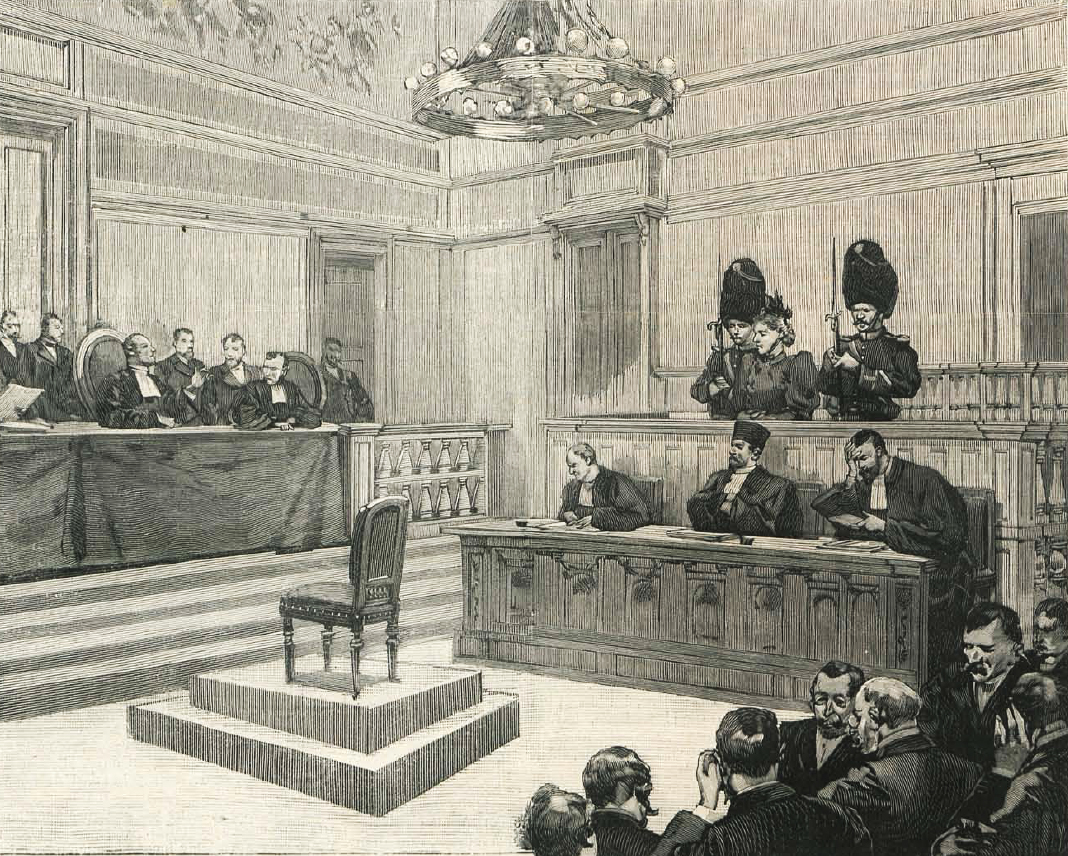

Dr. Willems, deceived by the words of Marie-Thérèse Joniaux from a previous consultation in Brussels with a colleague, concluded that a heart problem was the reason for the death. The company Gresham was not convinced and immediately filed a complaint with the public prosecutor in Antwerp, triggering the Joniaux affair. Joniaux was arrested on April 17, 1894. The trial sessions, led by Eugène Hayoit de Termicourt, lasted nine months. The trial took place on January 7 and February 3, 1895. A total of 296 witnesses were heard. Joniaux was sentenced to death and transferred from the prison of Antwerp to that of Mons where she arrived on June 6, 1895, to serve her sentence, which was commuted to life imprisonment.

She tried to appeal her sentence but it was rejected. She wrote a memoir. Marie-Thérèse Joniaux died in Antwerp in 1923, at the age of 79.

== Bibliography ==
- Albert Bataille, Criminal and worldly causes of 1895, The poisoner of Antwerp, E. Dentu, Paris, Available online in Gallica p. 151
- Raymond de Ryckère, The Joniaux affair, triple poisoning - indictment, report of the medical experiments and chemists: MM. of Visscher, Baisieux, Van Vyve, G. Bruylants and Herman Druyts, voice from beyond the grave (memory of Mrs. Joniaux), study of the trial, by Mr. Raymond de Ryckere, A. Storck, Lyon, 1895, available online on the BNF.

== See also ==
- List of serial killers by country
