= Julius Mac Leod =

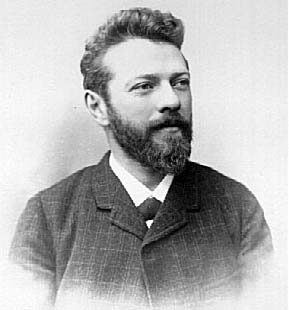
Julius Mac Leod.

Julius Mac Leod (19 February 1857 – 3 March 1919), was a Belgian biologist and professor at the University of Ghent. His father was of Scottish descent.

Mac Leod was born in Ostend. He was also director of the botanical garden. Julius Mac Leod was an active member of the Flemish movement and a proponent of the usage of Flemish at the University of Ghent.

He died in Ghent during the Spanish flu epidemic of 1918–1919.
