= Alice Frey =

Belgian painter

- Born: 25 June 1895, Antwerp, Belgium
- Died: 30 August 1981 (aged 86); Ostend, Belgium
- Known for: Painting
- Movement: Expressionism
- Spouse: Georges Marlier (m. 1922–1968)

Alice Frey (25 June 1895 – 30 August 1981) was a Belgian painter.

== Biography ==
Born in Antwerp, Frey was one of three children. She was trained as a dressmaker, a trade which she later taught as a school teacher. As with many Belgian families, the Freys left their home in the First World War, moving to Ostend. There Alice met painter James Ensor who became a close friend. Ensor encouraged her interest in art, and after the war she enrolled as student in the Academy of Fine Arts in Antwerp, where she studied drawing and painting.

It was as a student that she met her future husband Georges Marlier, himself later a noted art critic and painter. They married in 1922. Together they formed part of a group known as Lumière, which published a journal. A second journal, Ça Ira, was established by Frey, and these formed part of the avant-garde movement in Belgium in the 1920s.

Frey's work was widely exhibited in her lifetime. In her later years she became profoundly deaf and lived alone in Ostend. On her death in 1981, much of her work was sold at auction, and only the small collection that she willed to Ostend is readily accessible. Stylistically, Frey's work was influenced by Marc Chagall, Ensor, and Edgard Tytgat. Her early works are expressionist, while her later work may be closer to magic realism.
