= August Baeyens =

Belgian musician

August Louis Baeyens (5 June 1895 in Antwerp – 17 July 1966 in Antwerp) was a Belgian violist and composer.

Baeyens studied viola, harmony and counterpoint with Napoleon Distelmans and August de Boeck at the Flemish Conservatory in Antwerp receiving a first prize in viola in 1916. Beginning in 1911, he was a viola player in Belgian orchestras including that of the French-language opera company in Antwerp, de Royal, and in the orchestra of the Nieuwe Concerten.

In 1927, Baeyens founded the Antwerps Kamermuziekensemble (Antwerp Chamber Ensemble). The group performed a wide range of contemporary music before its demise in 1932. The ensemble is credited with many Belgian premieres including works by Arnold Schoenberg, Alban Berg, Darius Milhaud, Francis Poulenc, Béla Bartók, Paul Hindemith, Arthur Honegger, Igor Stravinsky, and several Flemish composers including Jef van Durme and Karel Albert.

In 1932 Baeyens became secretary of the Royal Flemish Opera (Koninklijke Vlaamse Opera) translating opera libretti into Dutch among other duties. Later, he was appointed director (1944–1948 and 1953–1958). In 1958 he resigned in order to devote himself to composition. After a long period of illness, he died in Antwerp on 17 July 1966.

== Selected works ==
Stage

- De dode Dichter (The Dead Poet), Ballet (1920)
- Liefde en de Kakatoes (L'amour et le cacatoes; Love and the Cockatoos), Grotesque in 1 act for soloists and orchestra (1928)
- Coriolanus, Opera for radio (1941); libretto after William Shakespeare
- De ring van Gyges, Opera (1943)
- De triomferende min (Triumphant Love), Opera (1948); after the 1678 opera by Carolus Hacquart

Orchestral

- Entrata (1917)
- Niobe (1918)
- Symphony No. 1 (1923)
- Vier kleine orkeststukken (4 Small Orchestra Pieces) (1923)
- Arlekijn (Arlequin) for chamber orchestra (1924)
- Kyklopen (Cyclopes) (1925)
- Sinfonia breve for small orchestra, Op. 24 (1928)
- Symphony No. 2 in F (1939)
- Symphony No. 3 in C (1949)
- Arkadia (Arcadia), Chamber Symphony for 19 soloists (1951)
- Symphony No. 4 (1952)
- Notturno (1953)
- Symphony No. 5 (1954)
- Symphony No. 6 in D (1955)
- Symphony No. 7 in one movement (1958)
- Symphony No. 8 (1961)

Concertante

- Notturno for clarinet, bassoon, string orchestra and bass drum (1925)
- Concerto for viola and orchestra, Op. 54 (1956)
- Concerto for trumpet and orchestra (1959)
- Concerto for horn and orchestra (1960)
- Rhapsodie for clarinet and orchestra (1966)

Chamber music

- String Quartet No. 1 (1922)
- Goudoogs verhaal (Goudoog's Tale) for violin and piano (1924)
- String Quartet No. 2 (1925)
- String Quartet No. 3 (1927)
- String Quartet No. 4 in G (1949)
- Woodwind Quintet (1950)
- String Quartet No. 5 (1951)
- Concertino for oboe, clarinet and bassoon (1951)
- Piranesi-Suite for flute and cello (1951)
- Sonata for violin and piano (1952)
- String Quartet No. 6 (1962)
- Etude No. 14 for timpani and piano (1965)

Piano

- Diogenes (1920)
- Jazz fantasie (1926)
- Sonate in A (1930)

Vocal

- Drie kwartijnen for baritone and chamber orchestra (1924)
- Trois mélodies for baritone and piano (1927)
- Drie Van Ostaijenliederen (3 Songs after Van Ostaijen) (1930); words by Paul van Ostaijen
- La sonate d'amour for narrators and orchestra (1934)
- Een somber drinklied for baritone and orchestra (1938)
- Vanwaar ken ik uw gelaat for medium voice and orchestra (1938)
- Drie liederen (3 Songs) (1938)
- Klein gebed for medium voice and piano (1938)
- Mystiek for medium voice and orchestra (1938)
- Examen troost for medium voice and piano (1948)
- Thanatos' avondlied for bass-baritone and orchestra (1948)
- Barabbas for narrator and orchestra (1949)
- De nachtegale for medium voice and piano (1950)
- Piranesi for 10 narrators, flute and cello (1950)
- Sonnet waermede den Landtman for bass-baritone and orchestra (1950)
- Scherzo for soprano and orchestra (1951)
- Vijf gedichten uit French en andere Cancan for medium voice and piano (1951)

Choral

- Lofzang aan de haven (Hymn of Praise for the Port; Cantique du port), Cantata for narrator, chorus and orchestra (1929)
- Sonatine for two-part chorus a cappella (1933)
