= Gust De Muynck =

Director of the Belgian Radio Broadcasting Company

Gust De Muynck (Antwerp, 5 December 1897 – Hoeilaart, 1986) was the first Flemish director of the Belgian Radio Broadcasting Company, the NIR - the precursor of the BRT and the current VRT. He was also famous as a writer and was married to Yvonne De Man, the sister of the socialist Hendrik De Man. De Muynck had a modest background; he lived at the Dam in Antwerp, and his father was cobbler, hairdresser and innkeeper.

== Biography ==
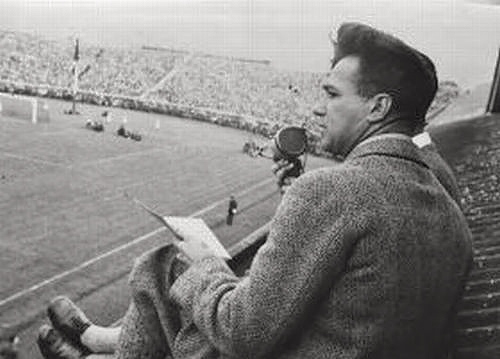
Gust De Muynck's live football coverage during Belgium–Netherlands in 1931

After his studies and military service De Muynck worked as an employee in a printing office. Thereafter he became active in the socialist movement and worked at the Arbeidershogeschool since 1922. In between, he kept studying at the VUB and in 1932 he became master in economic sciences.

In 1930 the Belgian National Institute of Radio Broadcasting (INR-NIR) was founded. The first director-general was Marcel Van Soust de Borckenfeldt, and per language group one director was assigned. For Flanders it became Gust De Muynck, for Wallonia Théo Fleischman.

During World War II he was employed with the National Work for Child Welfare. In between De Muynck wrote a biography about Winston Churchill. It was edited in 1944 both in Dutch and in French.

At the end of World War II Gust De Muynck left for the United States. He stayed there for a year and a half and was correspondent for both national radio broadcasting companies. Back in Belgium he became deputy of the Minister of Traffic Management in the council of the NIR, until 1958.

From then on De Muynck became Director-General of Social Affairs from the European Economic Community, in Brussels.

== Bibliography ==
- De Muynck, Gust (1944a). Winston Spencer Churchill (in Dutch). Brussels: Manteau.
- De Muynck, Gust (1944b). Winston Spencer Churchill (in French). Brussels/Paris: Lumière.
- Florquin, Joos (1968). Ten huize van... (PDF) (in Dutch). Vol. 4. Leuven: Davidsfonds.
