= Marthe Crick-Kuntziger =

Belgian museum curator

- Born: 2 April 1891; Liège, Province of Liège, Belgium
- Died: 30 May 1963 (aged 72); Brussels, Province of Brabant, Belgium
- Occupation: Museum curator

Marthe Crick-Kuntziger (1891–1963) was a Belgian museum curator at the Royal Museums of Art and History, where she specialized in tapestries and was the author of a hundred publications in her field. She was awarded the five-yearly Edmond Marchal Prize of the Royal Academy of Science, Letters and Fine Arts of Belgium for 1933–1937.

== Life ==
In 1919, Marthe Crick-Kuntziger graduated with a doctorate in art history and archeology from the University of Liège, where she studied with Marcel Laurent. This was a time when few women attended university.

She created the catalogues of the drawings and the engravings (1920) in the city of Liège collections. She wrote a monograph on the drawings of Lambert Lombard. She contributed to L'Art en Belgique, edited by Paul Fierens, and wrote a section on the decorative arts for Stan Leurs' multivolume Geschiedenis van de Vlaamsche Kunst.

In 1930 she participated in the international congress for art history in Brussels. She was a member of the Royal Academy of Archaeology of Belgium, and the Royal Archaeological Society of Brussels, of which she was president from 1949.

== Publications ==
- "A Fragment of Guillaume De Hellande's Tapestries", Burlington Magazine for Connoisseurs, 45:260 (1924), pp. 225-231.
- "L'Auteur Des Cartons De 'Vertumne Et Pomone'", Oud-Holland, 44:1 (1927), pp. 159-173.
- "The Tapestries in the Palace of Liege", Burlington Magazine for Connoisseurs, 50:289 (1927), pp. 172-183.
- "Bernard van Orley et le décor mural en tapisserie", in Bernard van Orley 1488–1541 (Société Royale d’Archéologie de Bruxelles, Brussels, 1943).
- Les Tapisseries de l'Hôtel de Ville de Bruxelles (Antwerp, 1944).
