= Barques de pêche–Méditerranée =

Oil on canvas painting by Théo van Rysselberghe

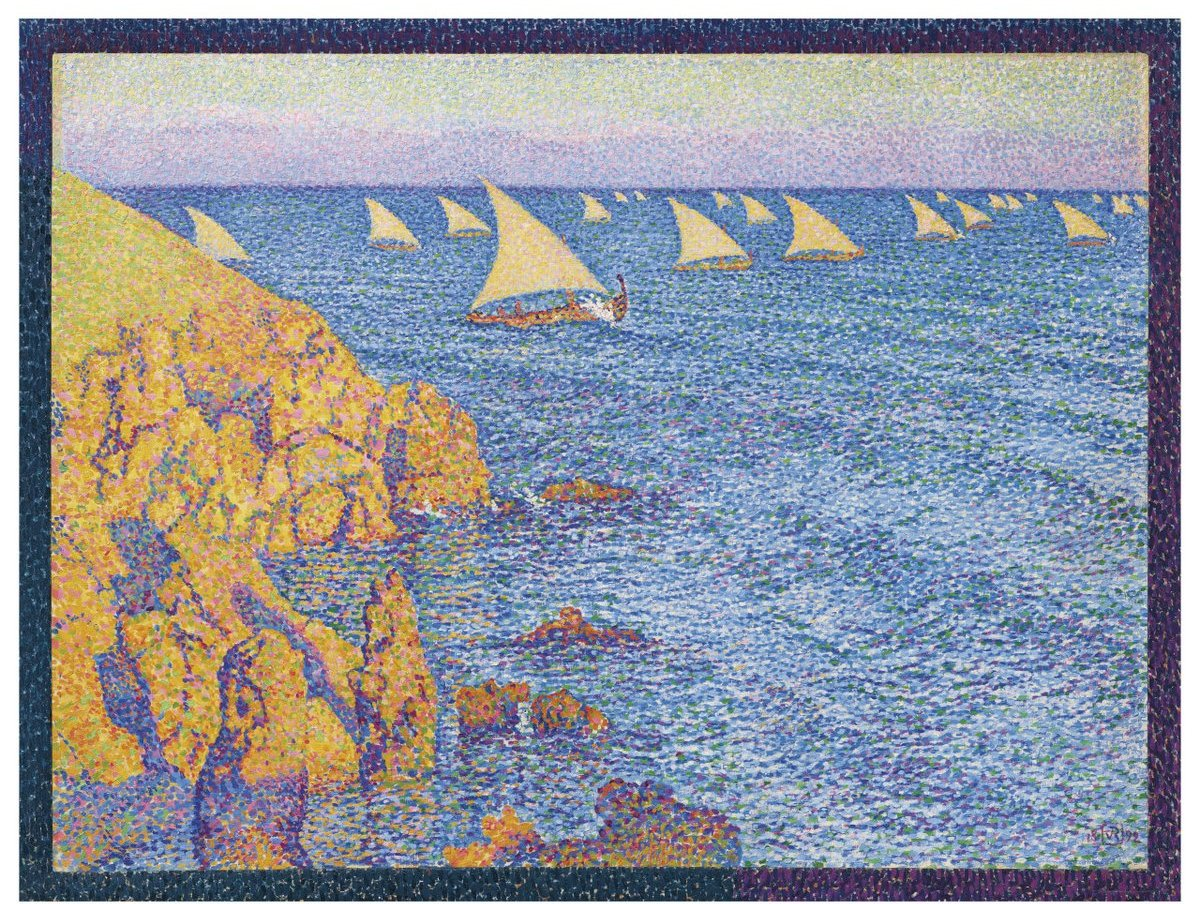
- Artist: Théo van Rysselberghe
- Year: 1892
- Medium: Oil on canvas
- Dimensions: 63 cm × 84 cm (25 ¼ in × 24 in)
- Location: Private collection, Unknown

Barques de pêche–Méditerranée is an oil-on-canvas painting by Belgian painter Théo van Rysselberghe. Painted in 1892, it depicts a fleet of sailboats off the southern coast of France. Van Rysselberghe's pointillist technique is well expressed in this work, whose wooden liner was painted with dots of contrasting hues serving to amplify the color harmonies in the canvas. The painting was realized by Van Rysselberghe during a two-month sailing excursion in le Midi with his close friends Paul Signac, and it offers visual representation of that sailing journey.

It was sold for over 9 million dollars at Christie's in New York in July 2020, during the COVID-19 pandemic.

== Painting ==
According to Christie's Deputy Chairman of Impressionist and Modern Art Cyanne Chutkow:

Barques de pêche–Méditerranée is a stunning example of Van Rysselberghe's use of the divisionist technique, offering a scintillating array of dots that convey a tangible sense of the vastness and serenity of the Mediterranean as the artist saw it. This exceptional work whose wooden liner was painted with dots of contrasting hues serving to amplify the color harmonies in the canvas, is one of the most important works by the artist to appear at auction. It offers a visual representation of Van Rysselberghe's sailing journey with Paul Signac and is an outstanding example of the artist's work in the prime of his career

Van Rysselberge painted this work during a two-month sailing excursion in le Midi with Paul Signac, a close friend of his and fellow divisionist painter. This trip came after a tough year for both artists, who were still mourning the death of Georges Seurat (who died of diphtheria aged 31) the previous year. During the months following the death of Seurat's brother, Van Rysselberge and Signac worked to secure Seurat's formidable legacy. They organized two memorials of his work and then set sail less than a week after the March 1892 exhibition in Paris in memory of Seurat.

They traveled on Olympia, the 36-foot cutter of Signac, named after Édouard Manet's painting. The two painters sailed along the French coast, boating past Cette, Marseille, and Toulon before anchoring at Saint-Tropez in early May 1892. Van Rysselberghe remained there with Signac until the end of the month. This time along the French coast was personally transformative for both Van Rysselberghe and Signac, who were still recovering from the untimely death of their friend. It was at this time that this example of Van Rysselberghe's mastery of divisionism, the technique that cemented his place among the 19th century's greatest Neo-Impressionist painters, was produced.

The painting was sold to an unknown customer on July 19, 2020, at an auction in New York City for US$9,128,000.

== See also ==
- Théo van Rysselberghe
- Paul Signac
- Georges Seurat
- Neo-Impressionism
- Divisionism
- Pointillism
- Impressionism

== Sources ==
- G. Pogu, Théo van Rysselberghe: Sa vie, premiers éléments, Paris, 1963, p. 18.
- C. Frèches-Thory, "La donation Ginette Signac" in La revue du Louvre et des musées de France, 1978, no. XXVIII, p. 112.
- S.-M. Canning, A History and Critical Review of the Salons of 'Les Vingt', 1884-1893, Ph.D. diss., The Pennsylvania State University, State College, 1980, pp. 404-405 (titled Méditerranée).
- S. Goyens de Heusch, L'impressionnisme et le fauvisme en Belgique, Antwerp, 1988, p. 452 (titled La Régate).
- S. Mund and H. Bounameaux, "La cote de l'artiste: Théo van Rysselberghe" in Arts Antiques Auctions, 6 June 2001, p. 47 (titled La Régate).
- R. Feltkamp, Théo van Rysselberghe: Catalogue Raisonné, Brussels, 2003, p. 295, no. 1892-011 (illustrated; illustrated again in color, p. 58; titled La Régate).
- C. Lloyd, D. Charles and P.D. Cate, Impressionists on the Water, exh. cat., Legion of Honor, Fine Arts Museums of San Francisco, 2013, no. 149 (illustrated in color; titled La Régates).
