= Jeanne Cappe =

Belgian journalist and author

Jeanne Cappe (29 August 1895 – 23 November 1956) was a Belgian journalist and author who wrote books for young people.

== Biography ==
The daughter of agnostic parents, she was born in Liège. Her father, a lawyer, was accused of embezzlement and fled to Greece; her mother Jeanne Fouassin disappeared and she was raised by her mother's parents. After completing her studies at a Catholic secondary school, she converted to Catholicism. She continued her studies at the Université de Louvain.

Cappe began work as a journalist, as an editor for Le Vingtième Siècle from 1924 to 1928 and for La Nation belge from 1928 to 1955. From July 1927 to January 1928, she was editor-in-chief for La femme belge. Around the same time, she married Fernand Desonay, a Belgian academic. Cappe helped found Scriptores catholici in 1934.

She wrote several lives of the saints for young readers, such as Astrid, la reine au sourire, published in 1935, which was translated into Swedish and English. Cappe published adapted versions of works by Hans Christian Andersen, Lewis Carroll, the brothers Grimm and Charles Perrault. She also published non-fiction works about children's literature and on child psychology.

She helped found the Conseil de littérature de jeunesse in 1949 and served as its president. The Conseil published the magazine Littérature de jeunesse, which was published until 1976; Cappe directed its publication until her death in Brussels at the age of 61.
