= La Libre Esthétique =

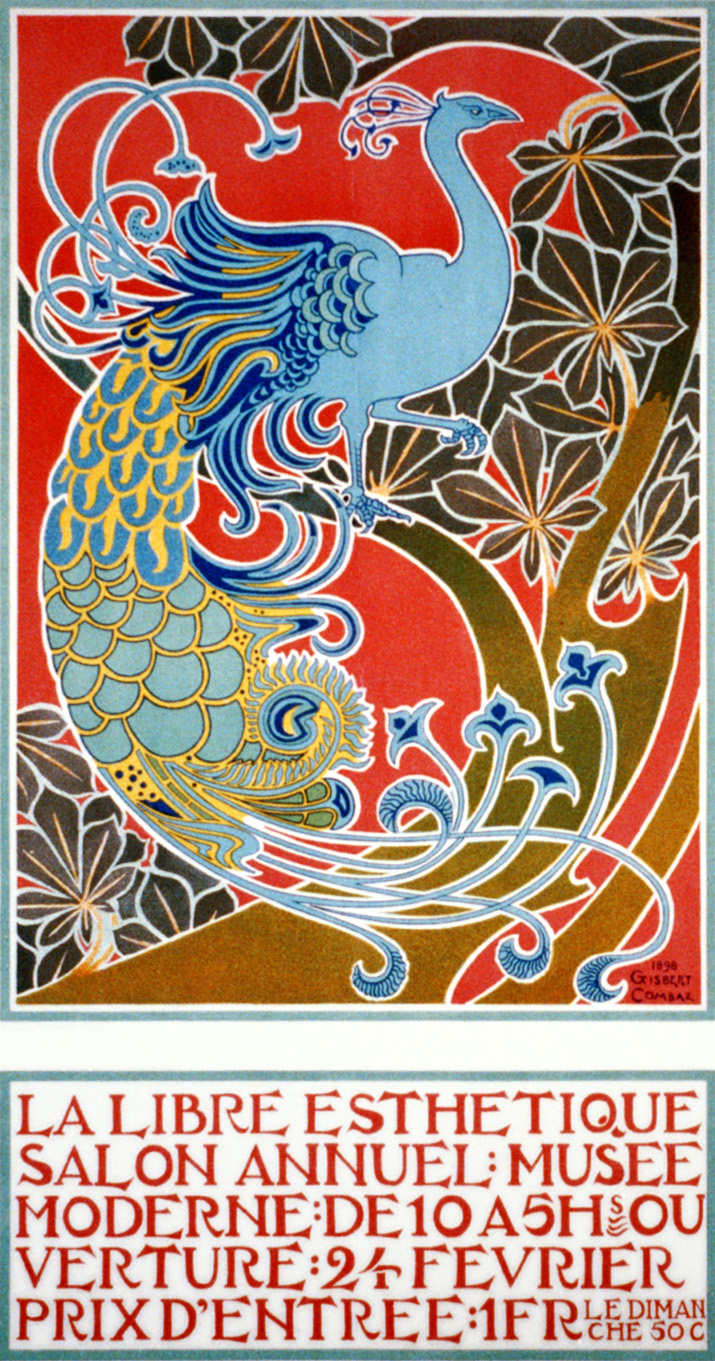
Poster for the 1898 annual salon of La Libre Esthétique by Gisbert Combaz

La Libre Esthétique (French; "The Free Aesthetics") was an artistic society founded in 1893 in Brussels, Belgium to continue the efforts of the artists' group Les XX dissolved the same year. To reduce conflicts between artists invited or excluded, artists were no longer admitted to the society, thus all exhibitors were now invited.

The first annual exhibition was opened on 14 February 1894, and the exhibition of 1914 was the last: a year later German troops had occupied Belgium, Brussels included.

== The Annual Exhibitions, 1894-1913 ==
All exhibitions were accompanied by a bibliophile catalogue, printed at Veuve Monnon, Brussels.

=== 1894 ===
- First exhibition, 17 February - 15 March 1894

Paul Gauguin showed five paintings, one from Martinique 1887, the others from his trip to Tahiti, 1891-1893. He even traveled to Brussels to assist at the opening, and published a review. Another artist showing works at the exhibition was Eugène Laermans.

=== 1896 ===
- Third exhibition, 22 February - 30 March 1896

=== 1897 ===
- Fourth exhibition, 25 February - 1 Avril 1897

With six recent paintings by Gauguin.

=== 1898 ===
- Fifth exhibition, 24 February - 1 April 1898

== Resources ==
=== Bibliography ===
- Madeleine Octave Maus: Trente années de lutte pour l'art, Librairie L'Oiseau bleu, Bruxelles 1926; reprinted by Éditions Lebeer Hossmann, Bruxelles 1980
- Les XX & La Libre Esthétique: Honderd jaar later/Cent ans après, Brussels 1993 no ISBN
