= Chantal Coché =

Belgian industrialist

- Born: 1826
- Died: 1891 (aged 64–65)
- Occupation: Businesswoman
- Known for: Ran royal porcelain factory
- Spouse: Emile Vermeren
- Father: Jean-Jacques Coché

Chantal Coché (1826–1891) was a Belgian industrialist who ran the royal porcelain factory from 1869 to 1891.

She was the daughter of Jean-Jacques Coché (d. 1852), and she married Emile Vermeren (d. 1869). Her father owned the famous royal porcelain factory on Chaussée de Wavre in Ixelles, Belgium. When her father died, her spouse took over the factory by marriage to her, but when he died in 1869, she herself became the director and manager of the company. She managed the factory with great success. When she retired, she left the company to her niece Marthe.
