= Eugène Laermans =

Belgian painter

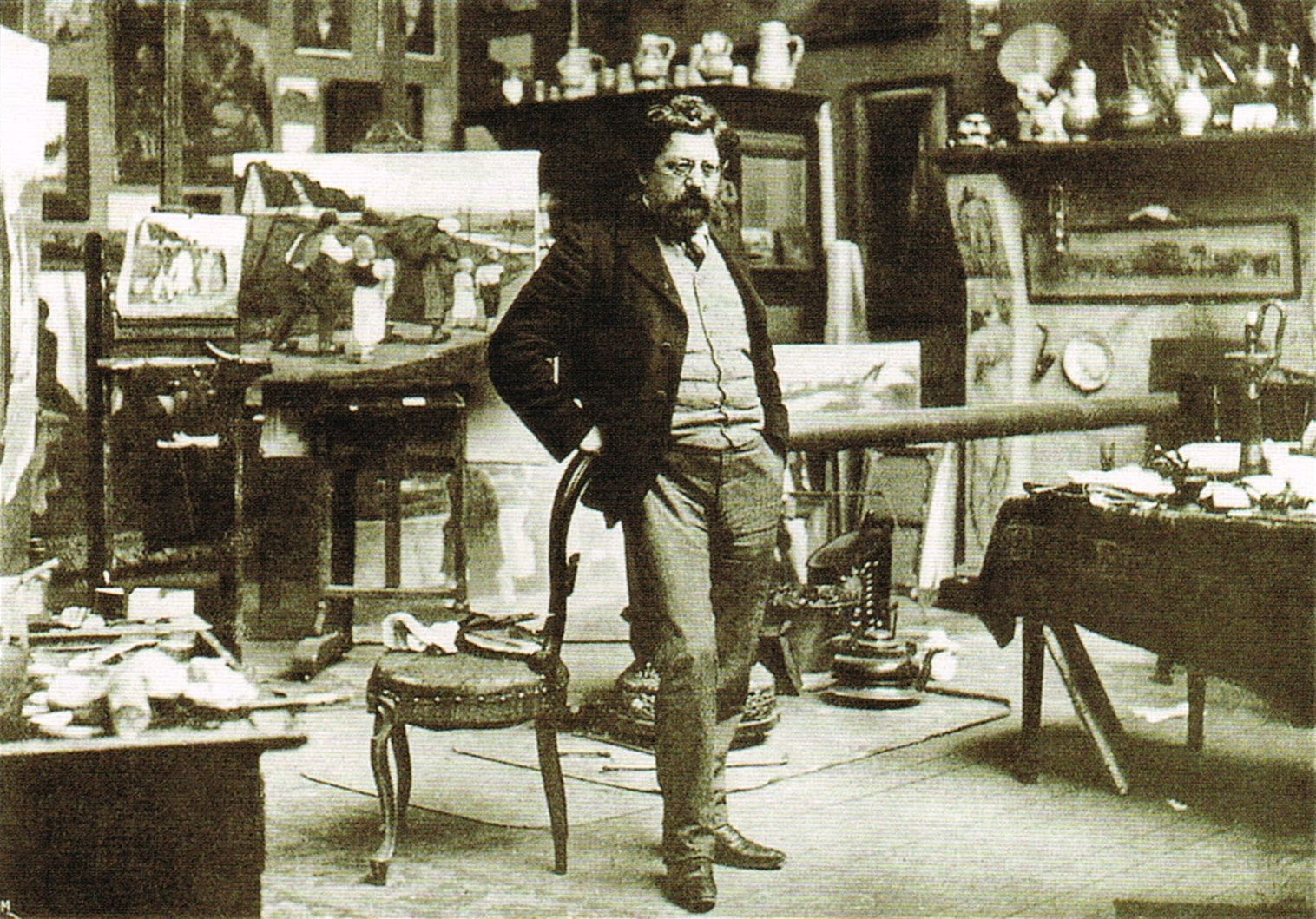
- Eugène Laermans in his studio
- Born: Eugène Laermans; 22 October 1864; Molenbeek-Saint-Jean, Belgium
- Died: 2 February 1940 (aged 75); Brussels, Belgium
- Occupation: Painter

Eugène Jules Joseph Baron Laermans (22 October 1864 – 22 February 1940) was a Belgian painter.

== Life ==
He was born in Molenbeek-Saint-Jean. At the age of eleven, he contracted meningitis, which left him deaf and nearly mute (although some sources say he was born deaf). This concentrated his attention on his sense of sight, and led to his decision to become a painter. He enrolled at the Académie Royale des Beaux-Arts in 1887, where he studied with Jean-François Portaels and was a great admirer of the paintings of Félicien Rops. The writings of Charles Baudelaire were also an influence, so Laermans joined the Decadent movement in 1890 and created illustrations for Baudelaire's book Les Fleurs du mal. By 1893, his work resembled that of Bruegel rather than the decadents, and he had settled on his signature theme, portrayals of downtrodden laborers and poor peasants which some critics saw as "disturbing caricatures". In 1894, he began to exhibit at the Salons of La Libre Esthétique. Two years later, he illustrated La Nouvelle Carthage, a novel by Georges Eekhoud, and was inspired by the book to create a triptych of paintings, "Landverhuisers" (Emigrants), that he considered his masterpiece.

In 1922, he became a member of the Royal Academy of Science, Letters and Fine Arts of Belgium. Two years later, his eyesight began to fail as well and he stopped painting, declaring "I am no longer Laermans". In 1927, the year his mother died, King Albert made him a baron. He became totally blind, faded into reclusive obscurity and died thirteen years later, in Brussels and was buried in Molenbeek-Saint-Jean.

In Wemmel, there is a wall called the "Laermansmuur". Once, as a student, when he was home on vacation, Laersman saved a drowning man there and the wall was later named after him. It is a low, whitewashed wall of a style that appears in many of his paintings.

== Honours ==
- 1919 : Commander of the Order of the Crown.
- 1922 : Member of the Royal Academy of Science, Letters and Fine Arts of Belgium.
- 1927 : Created Baron Laermans.

== Selected works ==
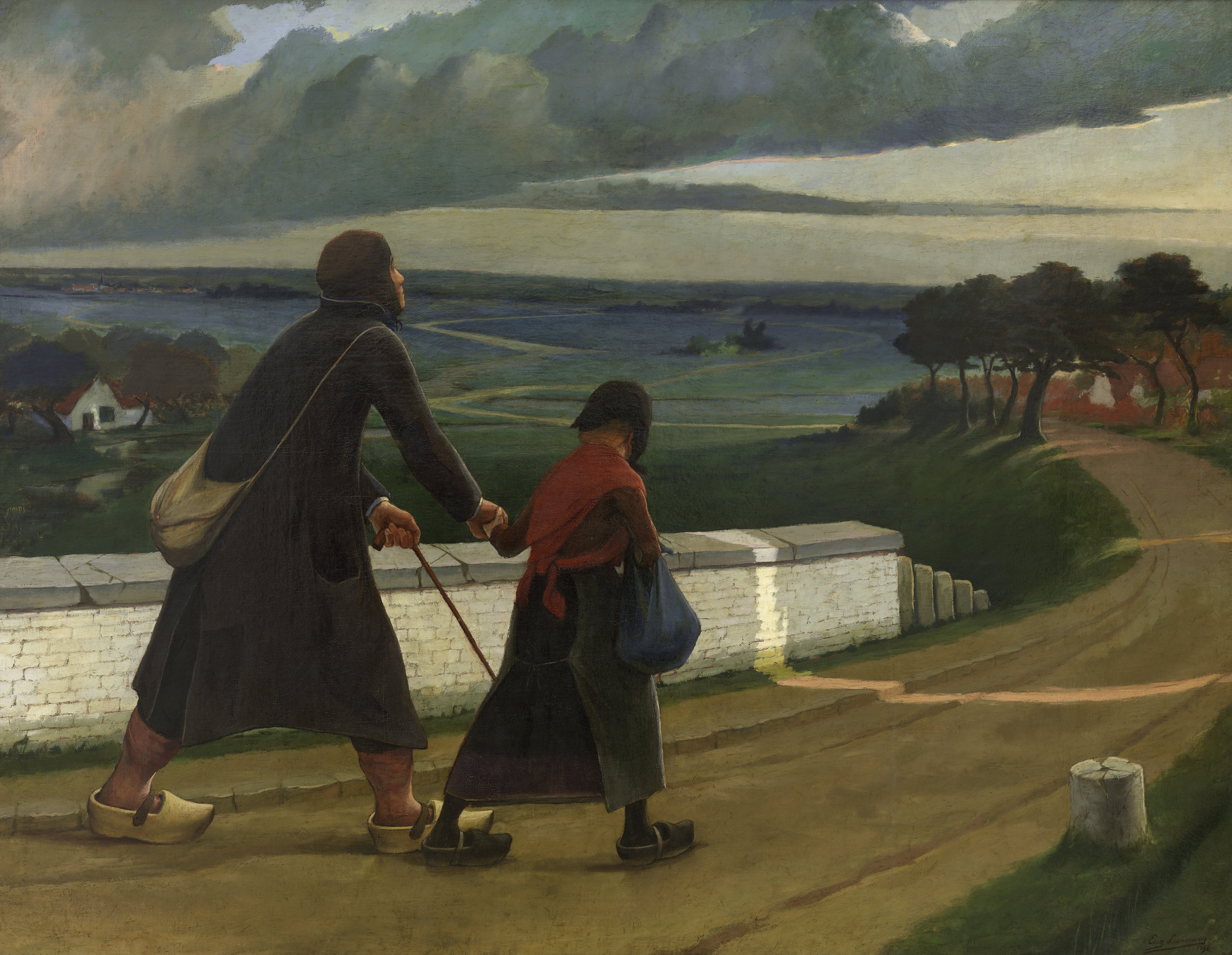
The Blind Woman (1898)

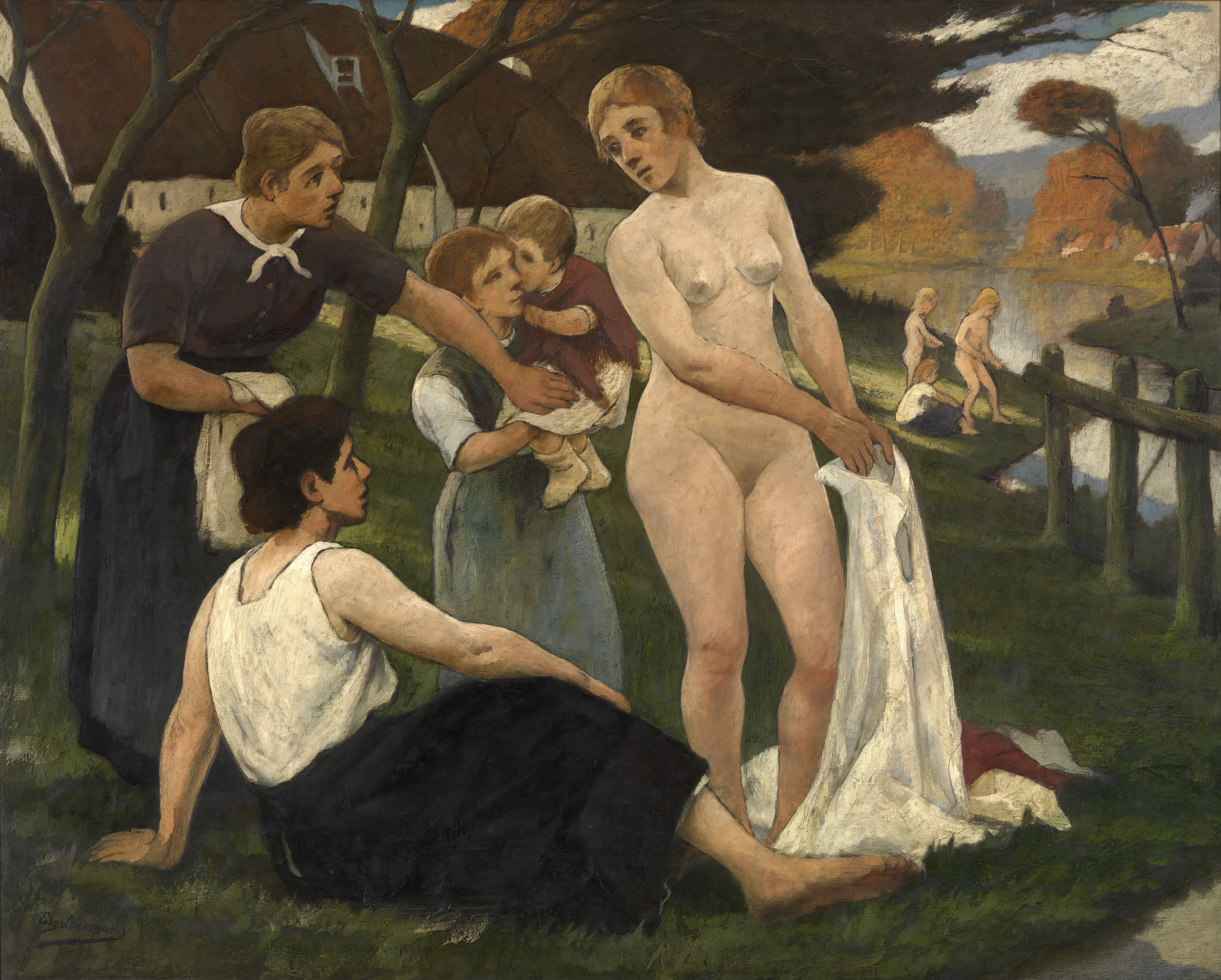
The Oasis (c. 1912)

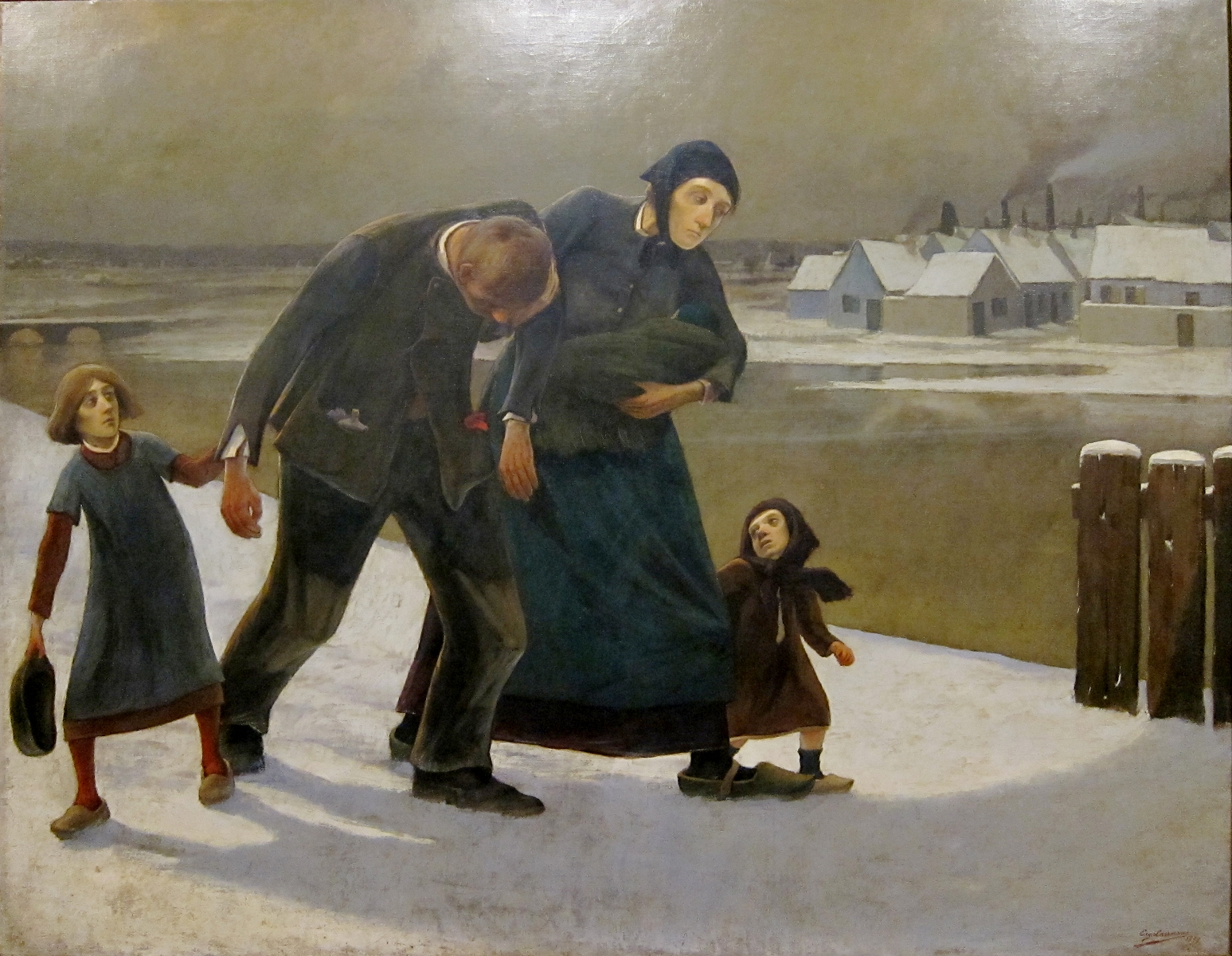
The Drunkard (1898)

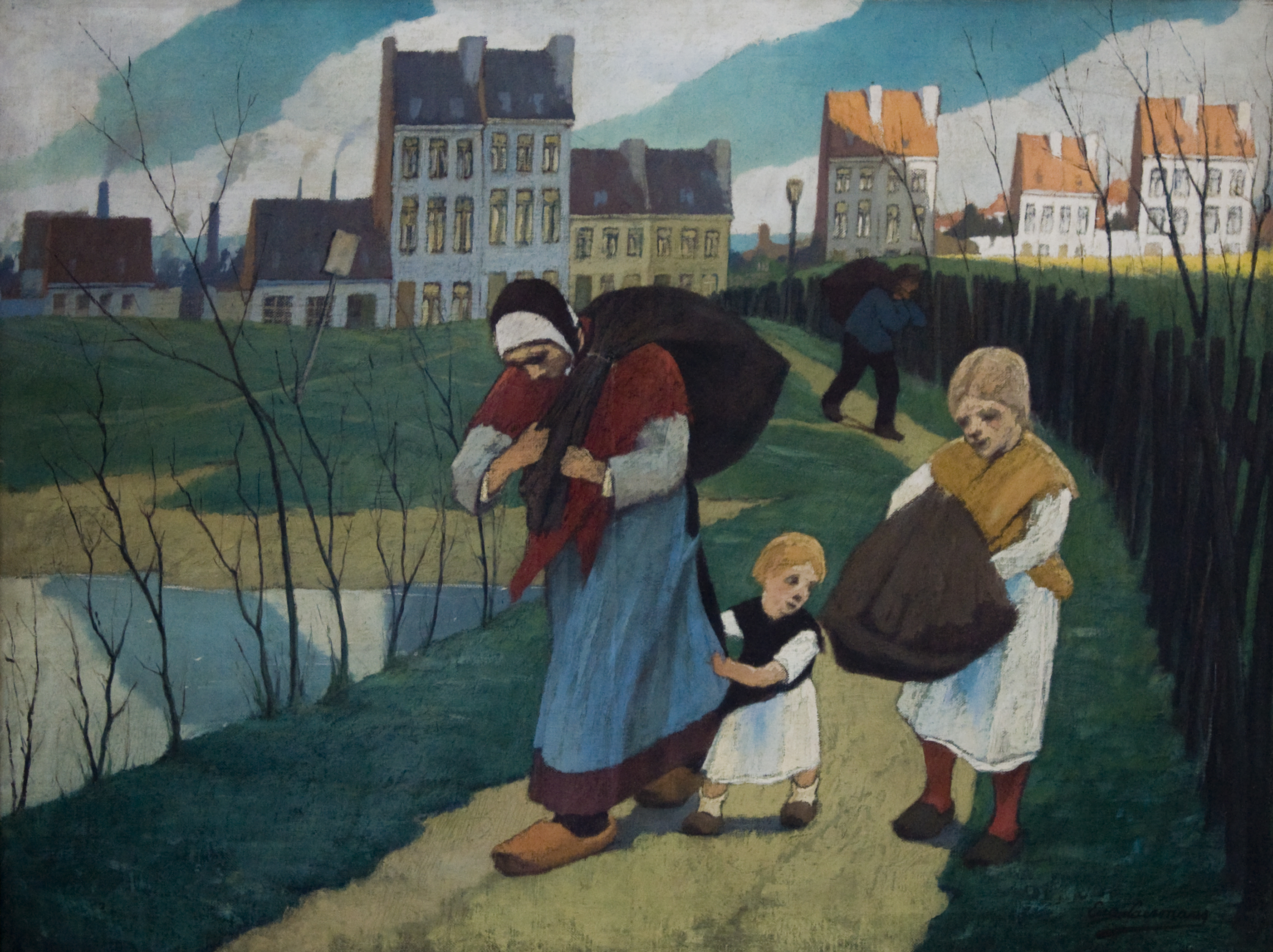
The Ragpickers (1914)
