= 1899 in Belgium =

- Decades: 1870s; 1880s; 1890s; 1900s; 1910s
- See also: Other events of 1899; List of years in Belgium

Events in the year 1899 in Belgium.

== Incumbents ==
- Monarch: Leopold II
- Prime Minister: Paul de Smet de Naeyer (to 23 January); Jules Vandenpeereboom (25 January to 5 August); Paul de Smet de Naeyer (from 5 August)

== Events ==
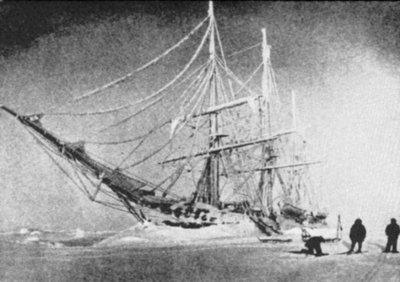
The Belgica trapped in Antarctic ice

- 24 January – Unable to broker a coherent government policy on demands for proportional representation, Paul de Smet de Naeyer hands over the premiership to his colleague Jules Vandenpeereboom
- 14 February – Belgian Antarctic Expedition research vessel Belgica freed from Antarctic ice.
- 28–30 June – Violent protests in Brussels demanding introduction of universal manhood suffrage with proportional representation.
- 29 July – Belgium among the 26 signatories to the Hague Convention
- 31 July – Jules Vandenpeereboom offers his resignation as prime minister due to the failure of his government to pass its proposed legislation for proportional representation.
- 23 October – Thomas Louis Heylen succeeds Jean-Baptiste Decrolière as bishop of Liège
- 5 November – Belgian Antarctic Expedition arrives back in Antwerp on board research ship Belgica
- 24 November – Bill introducing proportional representation on the D'Hondt method passed in the lower house by 70 votes to 63 with 8 abstentions.
- 3 December – Antoon Stillemans, bishop of Ghent, suspends Adolf Daens as a diocesan priest due to his political activism for the Christene Volkspartij.
- 30 December – Act introducing proportional representation published as law.

== Publications ==
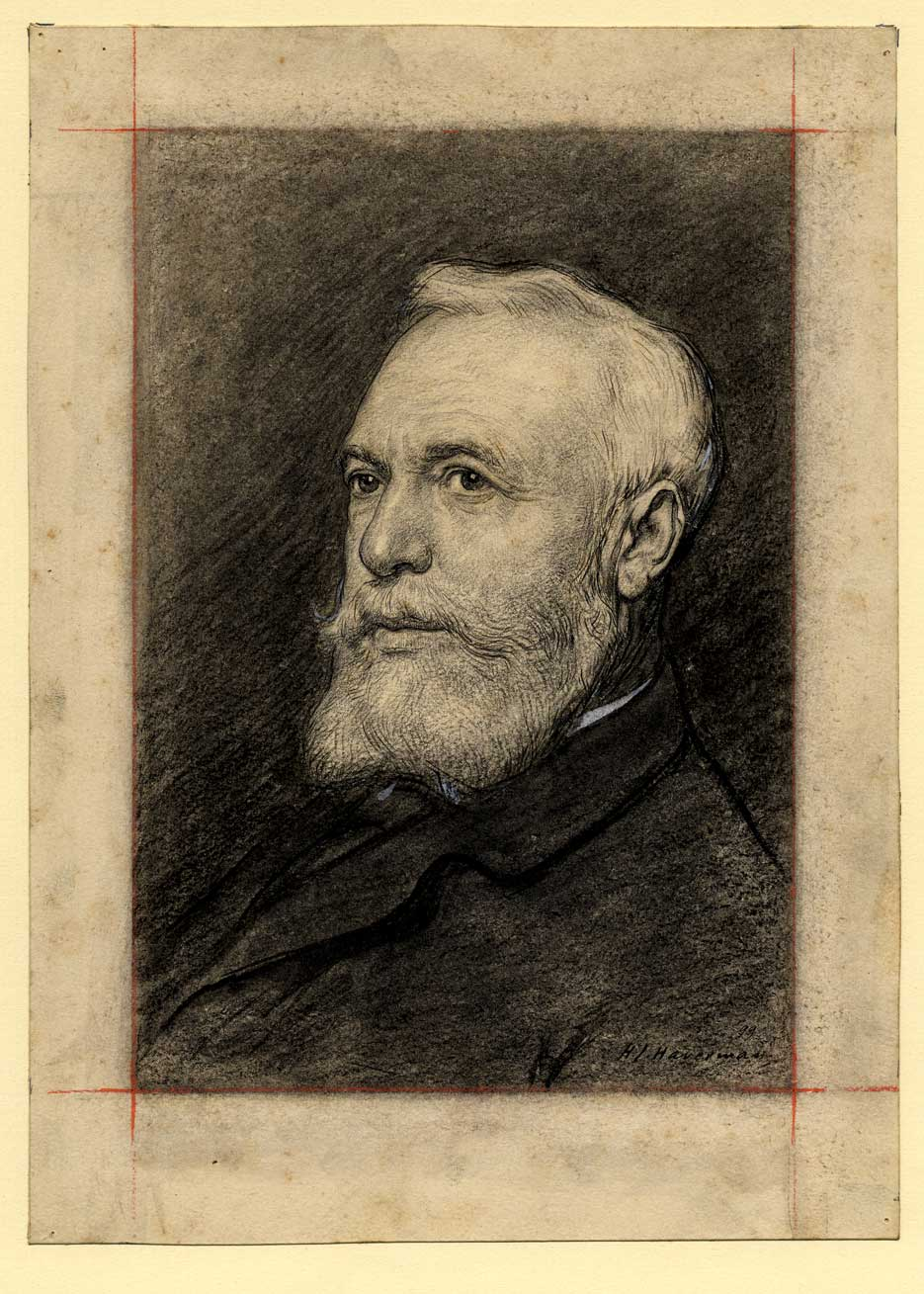
Max Rooses by Hendrik Haverman, 1899

Periodicals

- Annales de le Société d'archéologie de Bruxelles, vol. 13

- Biographie Nationale de Belgique, vol. 15.

Books

- Stephane Mallarmé, Poésies (Brussels, Edmond Deman)
- Pol de Mont, Poètes belges d’expression française
- Max Rooses (ed.), Het schildersboek: Nederlandsche schilders der negentiende eeuw, vol. 3.
- Stijn Streuvels, Lenteleven
- Édouard van den Corput, Utilité des embellissements de Bruxelles: Nécessité de l'agrandissement territorial de la capital de la Belgique
- Emile Vandervelde, L'Alcoolisme et les conditions de travail en Belgique
- Émile Verhaeren, Les visages de la vie (Brussels, Edmond Deman)
- Villiers de l'Isle-Adam, Histoires souveraines, with ornaments by Théo van Rysselberghe (Brussels, Edmond Deman)

== Art and architecture ==
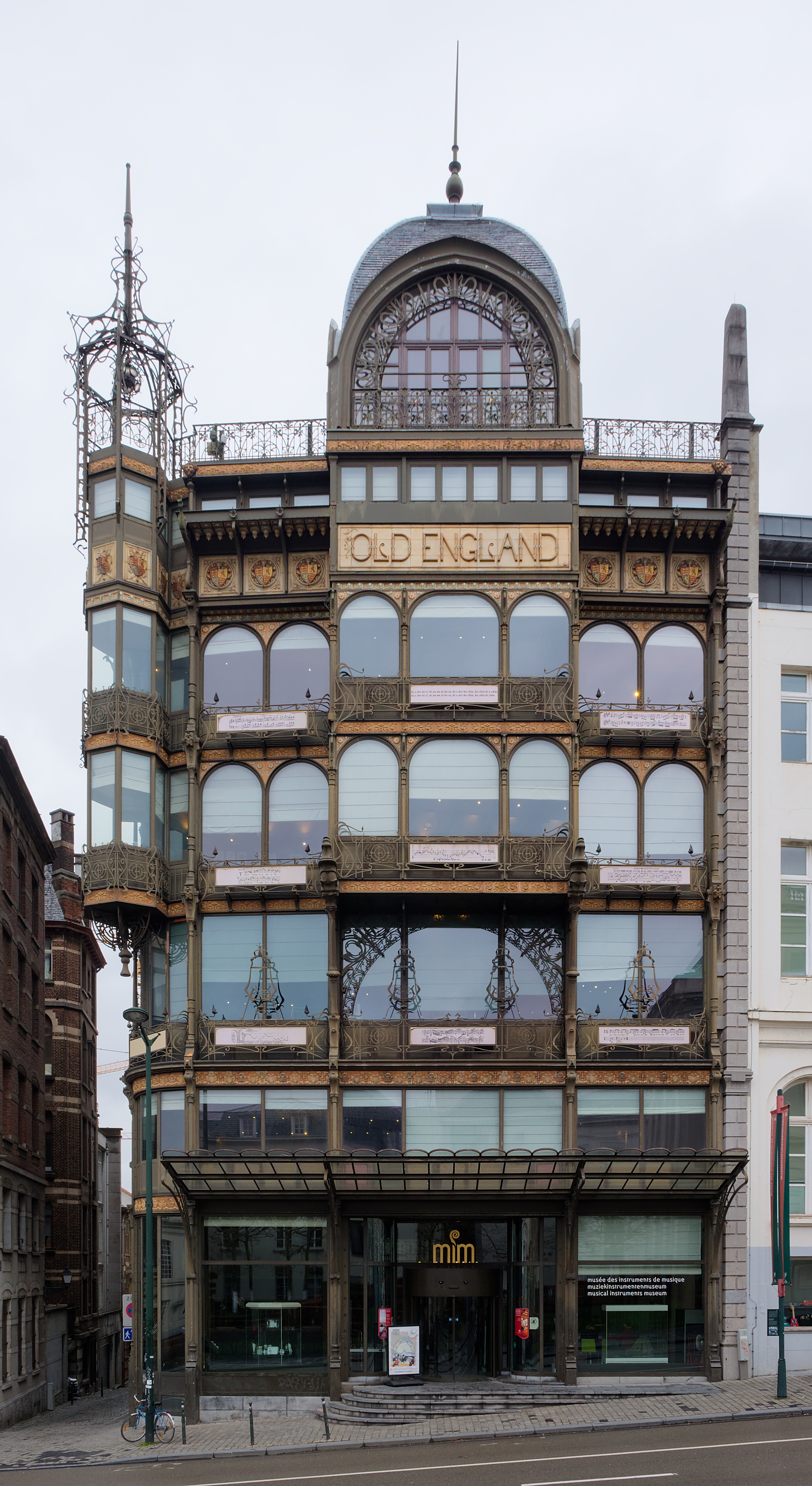
Old England department store, Brussels

Architecture

- Victor Horta, Maison du Peuple, Brussels
- Paul Saintenoy, Old England (department store), Brussels

Art

- Constantin Meunier, The Horse at the Pond

== Births ==
- 25 January – Paul-Henri Spaak, statesman (died 1972)
- 21 February – Clara Clairbert, soprano (died 1970)
- 28 February – Jacqueline Dyris, actress (died 1962)
- 20 March – Albert-Émile de Beauffort, colonial administrator (died 1983)
- 17 April – Gérard Debaets, cyclist (died 1959)
- 12 May – Maurice Carême, poet (died 1978)
- 17 May – Paul Ooghe, soldier (died 2001)
- 24 May – Henri Michaux, writer (died 1984)
- 21 June – Jean Hénault, athlete (died 1983)
- 30 June – Jean-Marie Plum, composer (died 1944)
- 22 July – Elisabeth van der Noot d'Assche, aristocrat (died 1974)
- 24 August – Albert Claude, Nobel Prize-winning biologist (died 1983)
- 29 September – Gaspard Lemaire, Olympic swimmer (died 1979)
- 20 October – Marnix Gijsen, writer (died 1984)
- 3 November – Julien Vervaecke, cyclist (died 1940)
- 8 November – Ernest Adam, politician (died 1985)
- 15 November – Auguste Pelsmaeker, footballer (died 1976)
- 20 December – Emile Brichard, cyclist (died 2004)
- 31 December – Richard Declerck, politician (died 1986)

== Deaths ==
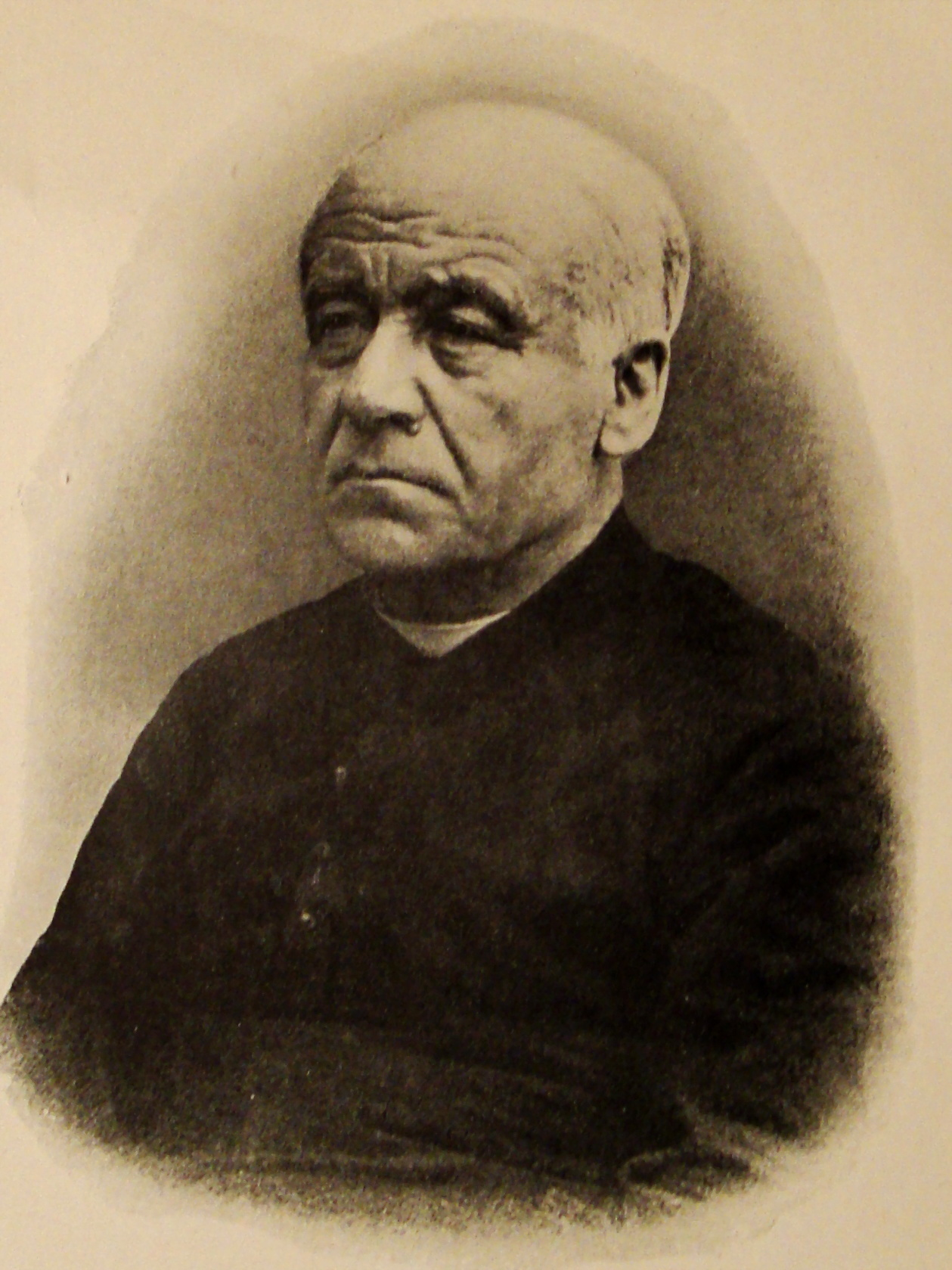
Guido Gezelle (1830–1899)

- 17 January – Camille Everardi (born 1824), baritone and voice teacher
- 1 March – Abraham Mayer (born 1816), physician
- 12 March – Edmond De Schampheleer (born 1824), artist
- 1 April – Clara de Hirsch (born 1833), businesswoman
- 28 May – Charles Piot (born 1812), archivist
- 14 July – Charles-Joseph de Harlez de Deulin (born 1832), Orientalist
- 27 August – Emmanuel Hiel (born 1834), writer
- 4 September – Théodore Baron (born 1840), painter
- 6 September – Jean Baptiste Carnoy (born 1836), priest-scientist
- 27 November – Guido Gezelle (born 1830), priest-poet
- 27 December – Henri Evenepoel (born 1872), artist
