= Childhood memory =

Early life experiences often memorable for life

Childhood memory refers to memories formed during childhood. Among its other roles, memory functions to guide present behaviour and to predict future outcomes. Memory in childhood is qualitatively and quantitatively different from the memories formed and retrieved in late adolescence and the adult years. Childhood memory research is relatively recent in relation to the study of other types of cognitive processes underpinning behaviour. Understanding the mechanisms by which memories in childhood are encoded and later retrieved has important implications in many areas. Research into childhood memory includes topics such as childhood memory formation and retrieval mechanisms in relation to those in adults, controversies surrounding infantile amnesia and the fact that adults have relatively poor memories of early childhood, the ways in which school environment and family environment influence memory, and the ways in which memory can be improved in childhood to improve overall cognition, performance in school, and well-being, both in childhood and in adulthood.

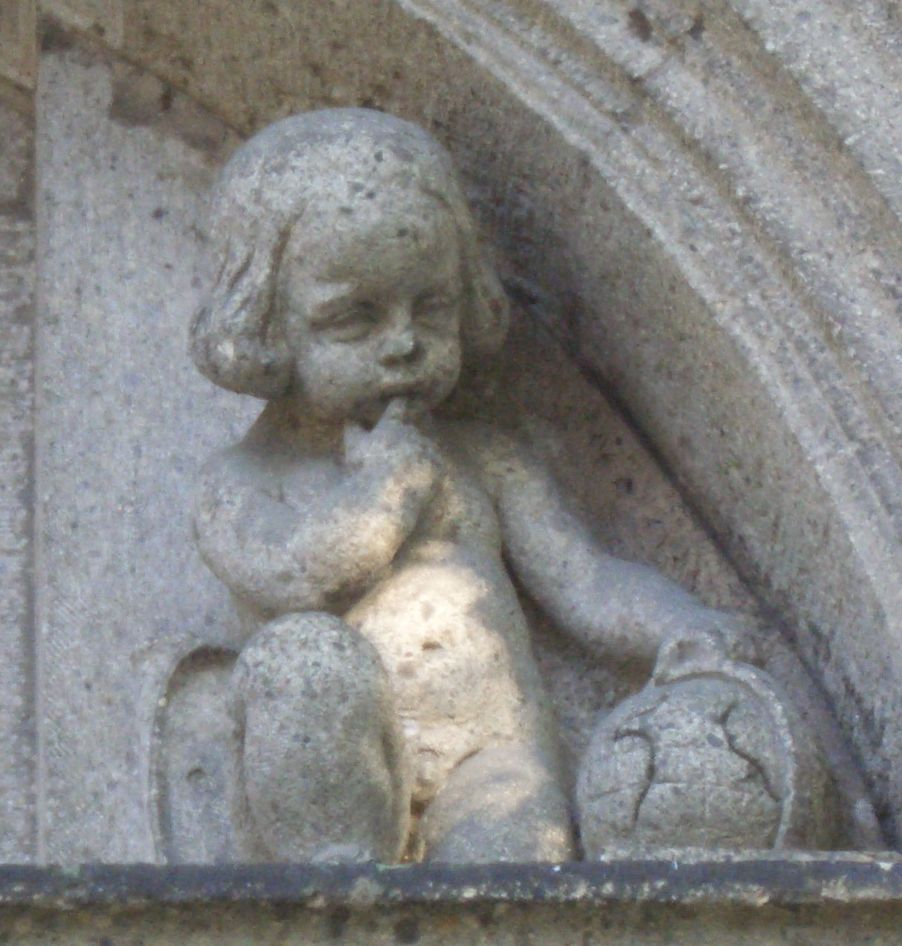
Sculpture around 1910. To be found at the entrance of Paulsen-Gymnasium, Berlin-Steglitz.

== Development of memory in childhood ==
Childhood memories have several unique qualities. The experimental psychologist and cognitive neuroscientist Endel Tulving refers to memory as “mental time travel”, a process unique to humans. However, early memories are notoriously sparse from the perspective of an adult trying to recall his or her childhood in depth. Explicit knowledge of the world is a form of declarative memory, which can be broken down further into semantic memory, and episodic memory, which encompasses both autobiographical memory and event memory. Most people have no memory prior to three years of age, and few memories between three and six years of age, as verified by analysis of the forgetting curve in adults recalling childhood memories.

Childhood memory research is relatively recent, having gained significant amounts of scientific interest within the last two decades. Several hypotheses have been proposed to explain the mechanisms underpinning childhood memory. Until relatively recently, it was thought that children have only a very general memory and that “overwrite mechanisms” prevented the later retrieval of early memories. Newer research suggests that very young children do remember novel events, and these events can be recalled in detail from as young as two and a half years old. Previous research presupposed that children remember pieces of information from specific events but generally do not keep episodic memories. Contrary to previous research, newer research has shown that children can recall specific episodic memories for up to two years prior to the onset of the earliest autobiographical memories reported by adults. The same research argues against the Freudian theory that early memories are repressed because of negative affective content.

Another older hypothesis that has been thrown into question is that of the prominent psychologists Daniel Schacter (1974) and Ulrich Neisser (1962), who hypothesized that memories are forgotten because cognitive schemas change between childhood and adulthood, meaning that information is lost with an adult's reconstruction of childhood events because present (adult) schemas are not suitable. Schemas change drastically around age six due to socialization and language development. However, as highlighted by katherine Nelson this theory has received criticism. Recent data suggest that a preschooler's schemas are not dramatically different from the older child's or the adult's, meaning that the ways of representing and interpreting reality do not change markedly from childhood to adulthood. Tests of very young children and adults show that in all age groups, memory recall shows the same sequential cause-and-effect pattern. One interpretation is that childhood memories differ from adult memories mainly in what is noticed: an adult and a child experiencing an event both notice different aspects of the event, and will have different memories of the same event. For example, a child may not show remarkable memory for events that an adult would see as truly novel, such as the birth of a sibling, or a plane trip to visit relatives. Conversely, children show stronger memories for aspects of experiences that adults find unremarkable. Therefore, the schematic organization hypothesis of childhood amnesia may be inadequate to explain what is remembered and later recalled.

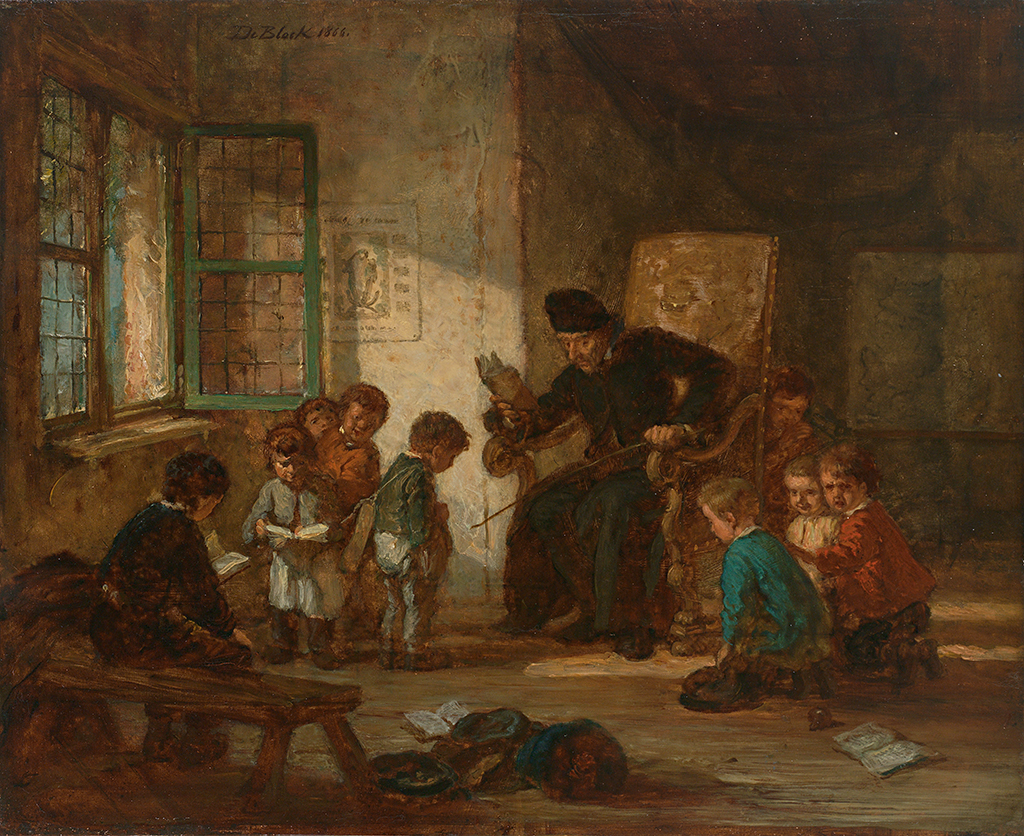
Schoolchildren in Belgian painting by Eugène-François de Block, 1866.

Another theory that has gained attention is the social interaction model of autobiographical memory development, or the means by which social interaction influences ability to remember specific events in the context of a life narrative. The social interaction model describes the way in which a child develops the ability to construct memories as narratives when the child has the opportunity to discuss events with others, such as parents. Parenting style is highly relevant to this theory. For example, different parents will ask different numbers of memory-relevant questions, will try to elicit different types of memory, and will frame the discussions in different ways. Nelson (1992) describes two different parenting styles: pragmatic and elaborative. Pragmatic mothers use primarily instrumental instructions that are relevant to a task the child is performing, whereas elaborative mothers construct narratives with the child about what they and the child did together. An elaborative style yields more detailed memories of events. The same researcher who found these results also made reference to Tessler's studies (1986, 1991) of memory for events in childhood. In these studies, children were taken on a trip to a museum. A week later, aspects of the trip and items that were seen in the museum were only recalled if they had been discussed at the time of the trip. Items that were not talked about were not recalled.

Although previous hypotheses have suggested that the role of the memory talk is active rehearsal, newer research suggests that its role might be reinstatement. In the context of infant memory studies, a learned response (example: playing with a mobile) that would otherwise be forgotten can be reinstated if the context is re-presented within a given time period. In this sense, verbal rehearsal of events between a child and a family member might serve to reinstate the cognitive context of the original event.

== Recall ==
The types of childhood memories that an adult recalls may be linked to personality. Research on both children and adults reminiscing about childhood memories is not well-established. However, considerable attention has been devoted to assessing the validity of strategies that can be used to recall early memories, particularly in situations where the accuracy of recall is critical. Some people claim to have vivid memories from very early ages, while others remember life events beginning around age five. Variables that affect age of first childhood memory include early family environments. One such factor is maternal reminiscing style. There is a long-lasting improvement in autobiographical memory in children whose mothers used an elaborative style of conversation after experiencing an event with the child. Autobiographical memory improves with age along with semantic knowledge of the world and ability to construct a coherent life narrative, but age and gender may influence ability to recall early memories. One study found that older adolescents and females perform better on both episodic autobiographical memory and memory for everyday events, given that females tend to provide more emotional, accurate, vivid, and detailed recollections, although conditions of high retrieval support (probing questions) reduced this sex difference.

The accuracy of recalled childhood memories in adulthood is the subject of extensive research and debate. Controversies exist surrounding the authenticity of recovered memories, particularly in the context of child abuse or trauma, such as the debatable accuracy of the spontaneous recovery of distressing memories that were previously forgotten due to inhibitory control. Because memory is reconstructive, false memories may be recalled. Errors might be made even with authentic memories when the adult has to infer missing details, is given inadequate retrieval cues, or recalls inaccurate details due to the power of suggestion from a therapist. Cognitive abilities, personality, interactions with the therapist, and genetic differences also play a role in the types of memories that an adult recalls and how accurate these memories are.

== Neurobiology ==
Different memory retrieval tasks involve different cognitive mechanisms. According to dual-coding theory, recognition of a memory stimulus can be studied via two cognitive mechanisms: recollection and familiarity. Familiarity is context-free, or independent of the context in which the stimulus was encoded, and concerns whether a person "knows" they have encountered a stimulus previously. Recollection is context-dependent on the details incidental to encoding of a target memory, and is related to the cognitive feeling of "remembering" something. Within the medial temporal lobe, familiarity tends to be associated with the perirhinal region while recollection is associated with the hippocampus. Cortical regions related to conscious recollections (feelings of "time travel" according to Tulving) include the frontal lobes, while unconscious feelings of "knowing" may be located elsewhere. Dissociation of recollection vs. familiarity has already been seen in 7-8 year-old children as they grow to adolescence.

=== Familiarity processes ===
Lateral prefrontal cortex, superior parietal cortices

The contribution of the lateral prefrontal cortex to working memory has already been recognized in adults. Also, the superior parietal cortex is activated for individual items that have been encountered previously. It has only recently, however, been demonstrated that the LPFC is already active in children by the ages of 5 and 6. It is still not known whether the LPFC is active in preschool children during working memory tasks.

=== Recollective processes ===
Anterior medial prefrontal cortex, lateral parietal / temporal regions, hippocampus

According to a study by Riggins et al.(2009), observations lend support to age-related increases in contextual memories. This is linked to maturation of frontal lobe structures and connectivity between the prefrontal cortex and medial temporal lobe. Recollection memory for details of individual objects is related to heightened activity in the anterior medial prefrontal cortex and lateral parietal/temporal regions. Recollection for details include the temporal order of events, and this is demonstrated to improve with age even between ages 3 and 4.

=== Recollection and familiarity dissociation ===
Assessment of childhood memory development shows a difference for familiarity of individual objects versus recollection of the details associated with these objects. Familiarity development tends to be more stable, while recollection continues to develop into adolescence. Methods used to assess these processes include behavioral, as well as electrophysiological (ERP), measures.

== Impact of school environment ==
Understanding how memory functions in children and adolescents might lead to more effective teaching strategies in the classroom. Executive functioning skills are the cognitive skills a child or teenager can exert over other cognitive processes to direct attention and achieve goals. Working memory is one subset of executive functioning. Executive functioning skills are rarely taught in classrooms despite the fact that executive functioning is very important for academic achievement, possibly even more important than IQ or entry-level mathematics skills or reading skills. Kindergarten teachers often describe self-discipline and attentional control in children as even more valuable in the learning environment than knowledge of the school material. Working memory (mentally holding and manipulating information) and inhibitory control (the ability to resist distractions) can predict math and reading scores from preschool through to high school. Many children lack executive functioning skills. Because teachers rarely receive instruction in how to improve children's executive functioning skills, children as young as preschoolers are frequently removed from class for exhibiting poor self-control. Associated problems include attention-deficit hyperactivity disorder, teacher burnout, student dropout rates, and increases in substance abuse and crime rates, particularly in children from low-income families.

One way of mitigating executive control problems is to alter the learning environment by implementing smaller class sizes or relaxing settings, which will improve working memory performance. Another way is to promote play as an essential activity, not a frivolous activity. Some researchers have found that mature, dramatic play enhances executive function. The same researchers found that the more a task relies on executive functioning, the more it is positively correlated with accomplishment. A third method draws from a series of studies in 2004-2005 (Klingberg et al.) which demonstrated improvement in children with working memory deficits, using training via computer games. The studies emphasize the use of working memory training that incorporates activities children are naturally drawn to. Improving school performance by improving memory through natural activities might significantly reduce dropout rates and save money for school districts.

== Improving memory ==
Techniques have been developed to improve memory by directing attention to internal and external experiences as they occur in the present. This has been used in the health care industry to help individuals overcome anxiety and other problems that interfere with memory retrieval in adults. Success in this area has led researchers to propose mindfulness as a tool for working with children. Relaxation is a way to reduce the flow of stressful or uncontrolled thoughts. Children may show decreased symptoms of attention-deficit hyperactivity disorder and aggressive behaviour along with improved memory in classrooms and in sports settings. Caution is required because some children may be uncomfortable with meditation. Smaller class sizes might also be a means of improving memory by reducing stress.

=== Long term memory ===
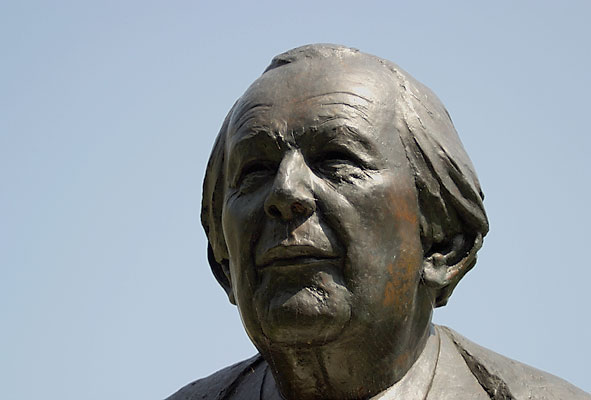
Jean Piaget

Operative training task to improve long term memory

The renowned developmental psychologist Piaget thought that memory and intelligence are linked. In Piaget's theory of cognitive development, operative intelligence is the conceptual framework of a child's understanding of the world, and this framework changes as the child learns. Piaget and Inhelder (1973) proposed a link between operative intelligence and memory, specifically that a child's ability to accurately recall an event or an image corresponds with the child's operative level. Previous studies showed very little improvement in operative development with training. However, one study points to inadequacies in older test designs. A study was designed using an operative concept of “verticality”, referring to a child's ability to accurately represent true vertical lines, such as drawing a chimney perpendicular to a slanted roof or perpendicular to the ground. Verticality is a test of the child's ability to comprehend and represent the three-dimensional environment. Children were presented with an array or pattern formed by sticks. Children reproduced the pattern more accurately after a longer intervening interval (6 months) than after a shorter interval (1 week). This has led to research to see if training such operative skills can improve long-term memory.

The results by Liben et al. were inconclusive due to the test design. The initial presentation of the stimulus itself improved recall performance months later, possibly because presenting the stick array led children to pay more attention to vertical lines in their environment after leaving the testing room. However, the memory gains might have occurred during various phases of the testing, but not necessarily within the long-term retention interval itself. In addition, the memory improvement might not generalize to children who are not in operative concept development transition stages. Nonetheless, these memory gains were unexpected, and might lend credence to the idea that operative development can be facilitated by presenting a stimulus that the child can generalize to his or her environment.

=== Short term memory ===
Context-dependent memory cues improve learning

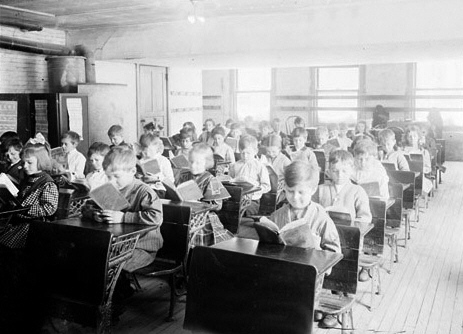
Children reading at desks in a classroom at the "Robert Emmet School" in 1911. The school was located at 5500 West Madison Street in the Austin community area of Chicago, Illinois

Emotion and memory are linked. The influence of the learning environment relates to both the encoding specificity principle and to the attention given to the test material. Arguably, a more relaxed school environment will improve memory and performance on tests. As hypothesized by Easterbrook (1959), Emotionality can negatively affect attention towards retrieval cues. Relaxation can be induced with music and odors, which cue involuntary memory on both free recall and recognition tasks. An experiment by H.J. Cassaday specifically used lemon and lavender odors to induce a calm learning environment which was later reinstated for retrieval tasks. As well, tests have shown that two retrieval cues seem more effective than one A test conducted by Cassaday focused on environmental conditions deemed to be relaxing such as smaller rooms and a lavender scent. This was carefully chosen with the additional element of familiarity (classical music already associated with school assembly). This study specifically used more than one cue because memory is multi-modal and context-dependent. Mood itself is a modality. Children can benefit from consistent learning environments that support less anxious states for encoding and retrieval of test material. It was also noted that relaxed encoding conditions followed by relaxed retrieval conditions improved performance compared with neutral conditions. This suggests that neutral conditions offer impoverished context cues for memory and retrieval.

=== Verbal memory ===
Music shown to improve verbal memory

Music training is known to improve mental performance and memory in certain domains in both children and adults. It has been well publicized that music training can improve mental performance and memory and that this can be seen in children as well as adults. The effects have been documented in a study that compared the effects of music on verbal as well as visual memory. The results show no improvement for visual memory but measurable improvement for verbal memory. Even those who discontinued the study outperformed a control group on verbal memory tests. It was found that even one year of musical training improved verbal memory. Training on an instrument results in stronger development of the left temporal lobe, which is linked to verbal processing. This type of usage-based neuroplasticity guides the development of synapses and brain structures in children.

=== Working memory ===
Exercise improves working memory

A study of school children in Germany has shown that moderate exercise can improve working memory. This has the most benefit for those children who have demonstrated prior learning problems. One neuroimaging study showed a relationship between fitness, hippocampal volume, and some types of memory tasks. Children with higher levels of fitness have larger hippocampi and perform better on a relational memory task. Another study found that exercise improves working memory in low-performing adolescents. According to Baddeley's model of working memory, working memory involves integrating multiple sources of information concurrently to guide behaviour. Procedural memory requires the involvement of the central executive in following verbal instruction while staying visually aware of the environment, ignoring distraction. In one study, participation in sports was found to improve working memory through the co-activation of the motor and cognitive systems, specifically the cerebellum and the dorsolateral prefrontal cortex. Improved motor skills correlate with increased activity in the cerebellum, enhancing memory and thus enhancing cognition.

Memory training activities followed by reinforcement tasks

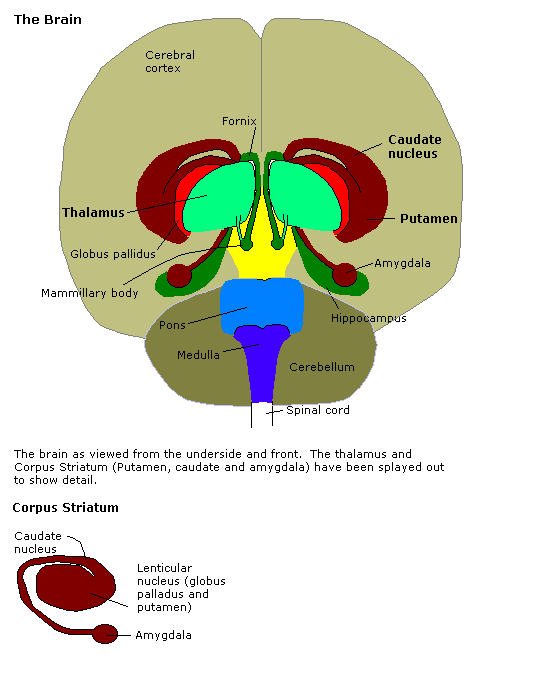
View of brain showing hippocampus and amygdala.

A study on reading activities has examined two conflicting hypotheses on the benefits of reading in either a context that does not offer repetition or discussion, or a discussion-based, usually family-oriented, repetition-of-facts context. It is commonly thought by educators that reading frequency on its own is essential to learning. However, without verbal or subverbal repetition, certain areas of the brain are not properly activated for remembering. These areas include the hippocampus and, possibly to a larger extent, the amygdala. The amygdala, specifically the basolateral amygdala, has a primary link with emotion and is thought to play a role in memory consolidation through emotionally stimulating reading of material facilitated by repetition. In addition, the CA3 area of the hippocampus "replays" story events through repetition, which promotes long-term memory. Discussion and review of storylines can be categorized as a form of environmental enrichment which aides in survival of granule cells and glial cells as the hippocampus develops. Finally, the use of pictures is an elaboration technique that enhances mental visual representations as a type of priming for later memory retrieval. Tests have shown improved memory in enriched storytelling environments.

== Memory in adolescence ==
Prospective memory can be studied as one memory system which shows drastic changes in adolescence. One of the last forms of memory to mature, prospective memory places heavy demands on the frontal brain regions, which are also among the last to fully develop in human beings. Prospective memory involves remembering to carry out an action at a certain time in the future. Although it is possibly absent in preschoolers, prospective memory starts to develop and continues to develop after preschool. Time-based prospective memory develops between 7 and 12 years of age as children make more efficient use of external reminders. In comparison with other types of memory development, time-based prospective memory requires greater executive functioning skills and is therefore mastered at a later age as neural networks become more sophisticated. Neural input streams from the frontal lobe become increasingly proficient as a child reaches adolescence and progresses into adulthood.

Prospective memory is responsible for planning, inhibition, anticipation, self-initiation of actions, and self-monitoring. It leads to more successful retrieval of source information. Usually, it is studied using a dual-task paradigm where participants work on an ongoing task while remembering to act when a cue is presented. One study examined age differences in event-based prospective memory. Participants were given two tasks: an ongoing task involving math questions and a personality questionnaire, and an embedded task that required participants to respond whenever a cue was presented. Young adults showed an improved prospective memory performance relative to teenagers, likely because the executive functions associated with the prefrontal cortex are among the last to mature. The prefrontal cortex does not finish developing until the second decade of life. More research is required to determine the nature of the complex interactions between growth hormones, variables such as social environment, and memory development as neural development reaches its peak.

== See also ==
- Baddley's model of working memory
- Child development
- Childhood amnesia
- Cognitive development
- Cognitive psychology
- Early childhood education
- Environmental enrichment
- Experimental psychology
- Memory
- Memory consolidation
- Memory encoding
- Memory rehearsal
- Methods used to study memory
- Neural development
- Neuroplasticity
- Parenting styles
- Recovered memory
- Self-concept
- State-dependent learning
