= 1900 in Belgium =

- Decades: 1880s; 1890s; 1900s; 1910s; 1920s
- See also: Other events of 1900; List of years in Belgium

Events in the year 1900 in Belgium.

== Incumbents ==
- Monarch: Leopold II
- Prime Minister: Paul de Smet de Naeyer

== Events ==
- 4 April – Jean-Baptiste Sipido shoots at the Prince of Wales in Brussels-North railway station
- 27 May – Belgian general election, 1900
- 3 June – Provincial elections
- 2 October – Wedding of Albert I of Belgium and Elisabeth of Bavaria.

== Publications ==
Periodicals

- Annales de la Société d'Archéologie de Bruxelles, vol. 14 (Brussels, Alfred Vromant)

Scholarship

- Maurice De Wulf, Histoire de la Philosophie Médiévale (Leuven, Paris and Brussels)
- Karl Hanquet, Étude critique sur la Chronique de Saint-Hubert dite Cantatorium
- Henri Pirenne, Histoire de Belgique, vol. 1.
- Max Rooses (ed.), Het schildersboek: Nederlandsche schilders der negentiende eeuw, vol. 4,
- Emile Vandervelde, Le propriété foncière en Belgique

Literature

- Émile Verhaeren, Le cloître (Brussels, Edmond Deman)
- Émile Verhaeren, Petites légendes (Brussels, Edmond Deman)

== Arts and architecture ==
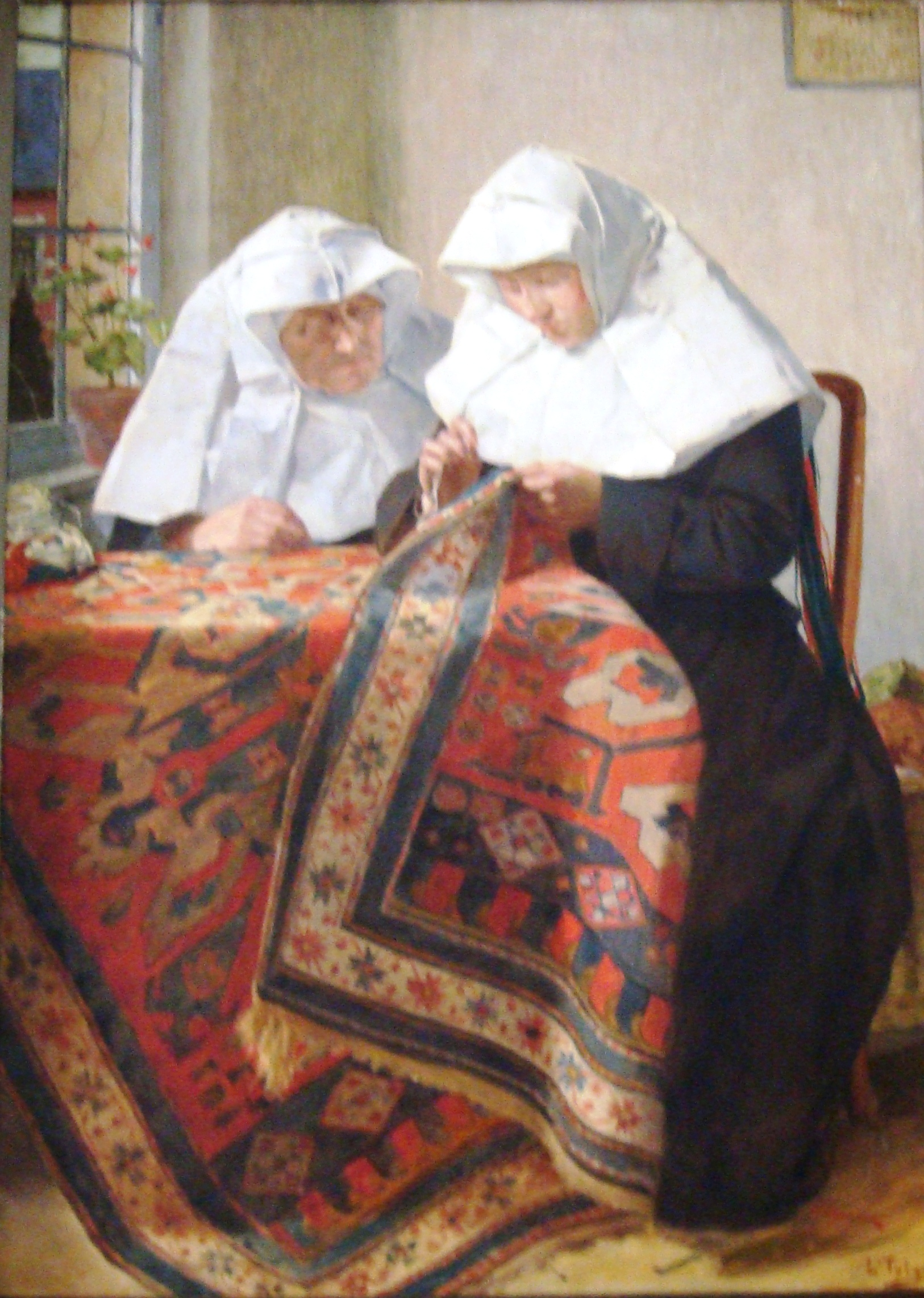
Louis Tytgadt, Beguines at Work (1900)

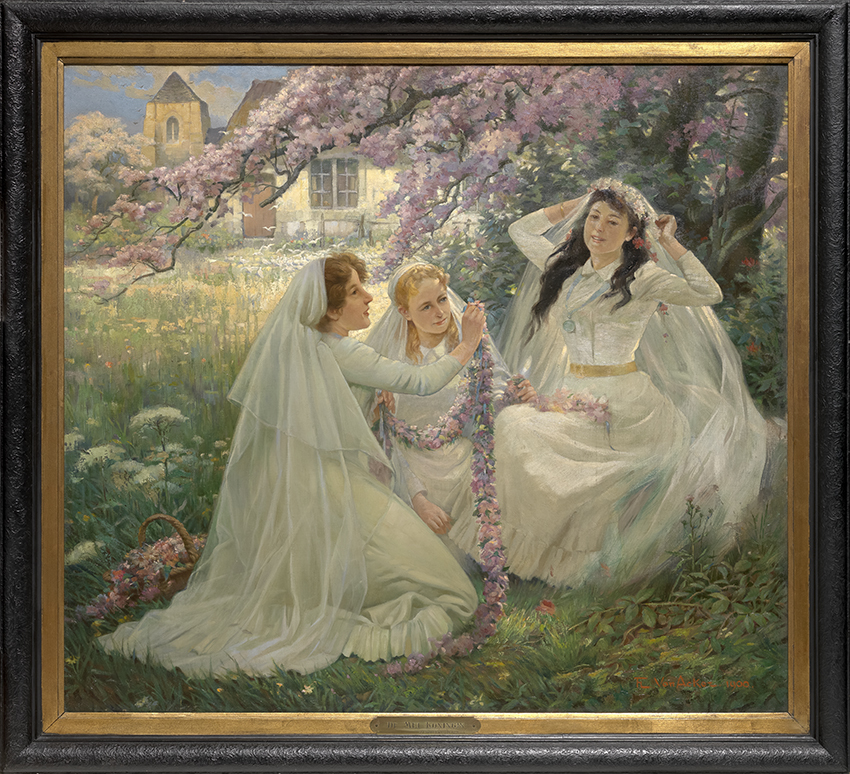
Flori van Acker, The May Queen (1900)

- Louis Tytgadt, Beguines at Work
- Flori van Acker, The May Queen

== Births ==
- 13 March – Andrée Bosquet, painter (died 1980)
- 1 April – Albert Ayguesparse, writer (died 1996)
- 22 May – Vina Bovy, operatic soprano (died 1983)
- 19 September – Marguerite Massart, engineer (died 1979)
- 25 December – Karel Maes, artist (died 1974)

== Deaths ==
- 4 August – Étienne Lenoir (born 1822), engineer
- 22 November – Georges Brugmann (born 1829), banker
