= Ludwig von Hagn =

German painter

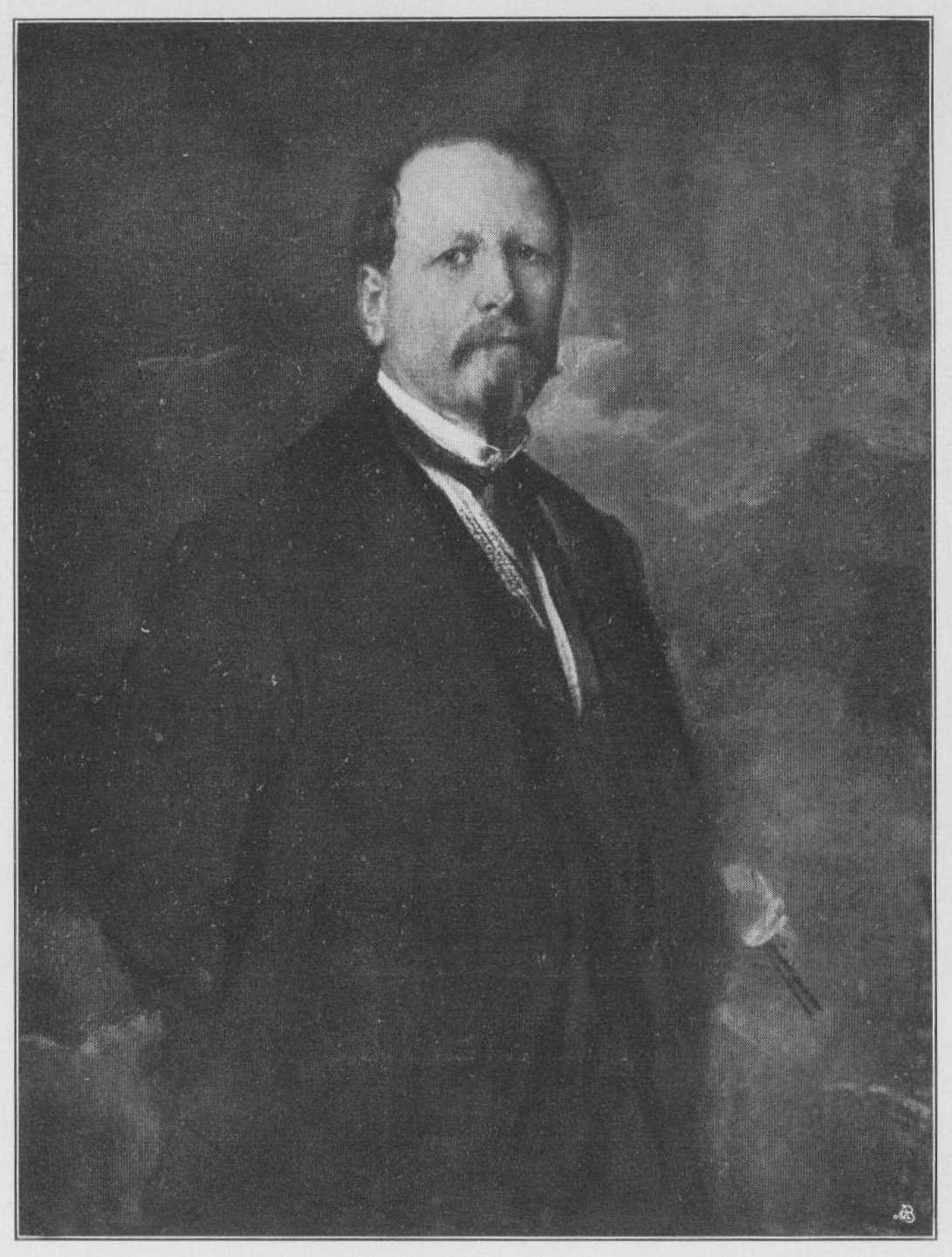
Ludwig von Hagn, portrait by Franz von Lenbach (1863).

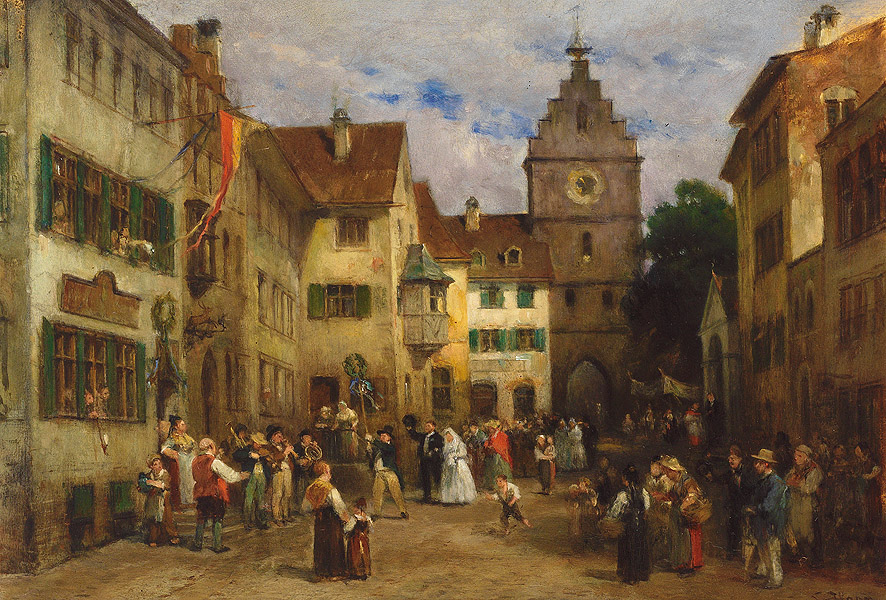
Busy Street with Wedding Party in Überlingen

Ludwig von Hagn (or Louis von Hagn; 23 November 1819 – 15 January 1898) was a German genre painter.

== Biography ==
He was born in Munich, the son of a businessman Karl von Hagn and his wife Josepha Schwab. His older sister, Charlotte von Hagn, was a well-known actress.

After a brief public education, he followed his family's wishes and entered the local Cadet School. Following a visit to Berlin with his sister in 1840, he developed an interest in art. Soon after, he left the Cadet Corps and became a student of the marine painter Wilhelm Krause. Upon returning to Munich, he enrolled at the Academy of Fine Arts, where his instructors included the history painter Clemens von Zimmermann and the landscape painter Albert Zimmermann (no relation).

In 1846, he became one of the first artists from Munich to study in Antwerp. His instructors there were Gustave Wappers and Eugène-François de Block. He spent a year with the latter, working at his studio in Brussels. In 1850, he returned to Berlin to study architecture and was influenced by the works of Adolph Menzel. His visits to Sanssouci began to give his paintings a Rococo touch.

From 1853 to 1855, he was in Paris, where he became interested in the works of Léon Cogniet, Paul Delaroche, Jean-Louis-Ernest Meissonier and Joseph Nicolas Robert-Fleury. During this time, he became lifelong friends with his former Belgian colleagues Florent Willems and Alfred Stevens.

In 1855, he settled in Munich and became a freelance painter, forming a small circle of like-minded acquaintances that included Franz von Lenbach, Victor Müller and August von Pettenkofen. From 1863 to 1865, he continued his studies in Florence, Italy, and moved away from the Rococo style. He died in his home city of Munich.
