= Methods used to study memory =

The study of memory incorporates research methodologies from neuropsychology, human development and animal testing using a wide range of species. The complex phenomenon of memory is explored by combining evidence from many areas of research. New technologies, experimental methods and animal experimentation have led to an increased understanding of the workings of memory.

== Human subjects ==
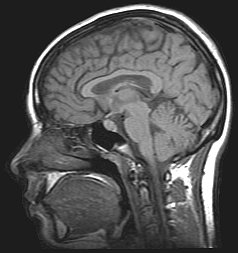
MRI of the human brain.

It is usually desirable to study memory in humans because we have the ability to subjectively describe experiences, and have the intellect to perform complex and indirect tests of memory. Lesion studies allow us to reduce the neural mechanisms of memory, and results from finely constructed psychological tests can help us make inferences about how memory works. Neuropsychologists attempt to show that specific behavioural deficits are associated with specific sites of brain damage. The famous case of HM, a man who had both his medial temporal lobes removed resulting in profound amnesia, illustrates how brain damage can tell us a lot about the inner workings of memory. One of the fundamental problems with studying human patients who have already acquired brain damage is the lack of experimental control. Comparisons usually have to be made between individuals; exact lesion location and individual differences cannot be controlled for.

=== Item list memory tasks ===
==== Ebbinghaus ====
Hermann Ebbinghaus began the scientific study of human memory with this treatise On Memory in 1885. Ebbinghaus experimented on himself by testing his own ability to memorize lists of randomly arranged syllables presented at a regular pace of 2.5 syllables per second. He would record how long it took him to memorize a list of syllables and also how quickly he would lose the memorization. With this data, he traced learning and forgetting curves. Ebbinghaus also collected data on his ability to memorize at different times of the day and under different conditions. His work later influenced G.E. Müller who continued the tradition of lists of items to conduct memory experiments on human subjects and using behavioural data to develop models of memory. The two most common types of memory studied using these methods are recognition and recall.

==== Recognition ====
Recognition memory is the ability to judge whether or not the cued item was previously presented on the list usually with a yes or no response. This memory is akin to the type of memory used for police line-ups. The particular task described used to be called "item recognition". Scientists study the rates of hits (correct "yes" responses) related to the rates of false alarms (incorrect "yes" responses) with statistical analysis to develop theories on how the recognition judgement is stored and retrieved. These theories are then developed into memory models.

==== Recall ====
Recall memory is the ability to retrieve stored information either by being cued by a particular associated item or without an associated cue. The first is called cued recall and the second is called free recall. In cued recall the participant studies a list of paired items and then is presented one half of those pairs and must recall the associated other half. A common additional task is to have the participant learn a new set of associations with the cued items and study the amount of interference from prior association that occurs. These experiments help to develop theories on how we learn associations and what conditions affect that learning. The free recall does not use item pairs. Instead, participants study a list of items and then recall that list in the order that they retrieve the items from memory. In these experiments the data is drawn from the order in which items are recalled and the inter-response times. This data is used to develop models of memory storage and retrieval.

=== Children ===
Humans are extremely dependent on memory for survival as we are dependent on our ability to identify and remember a wide range of material in order to learn and function, which is why the capability for memory is developed at a very young age. Memory in children is displayed in simpler ways than in adults due to lack of verbal communication and mental capabilities, and therefore the testing methods are similar but are modified to suit age specific abilities.

Observational and experimental methods are used to test children's memory by documenting either their physical actions, emotional (facial) response or attention/ focus, depending on the age (ability) of the child and the type of task provided. An older child can provide answers to both verbal and non-verbal tests to more complex tasks in a more detailed and accurate way and therefore produce more direct data. The change of methods according to age is necessary for several reasons particularly because memory ability expands at certain stages of childhood and can be influenced by biological advances and environmental experience.

From birth, children use observational (imitation) and auditory learning styles with increasing ability to remember complex sequences and concepts. The rapid growth in ability to retain information is partly due to the increase of myelin, which increases the speed of impulses between neurons, especially in the visual and auditory cortexes which become myelinated very early in the development processes. The amount of myelination has a direct effect on the speed of information-processing and in turn the speed and strength at which we are able to remember things. Understanding of contexts and relationships, as well as memory strategies such as chunking and learning of schemas, can also influence the strength of memories and therefore must be considered when choosing a method of testing.

==== Action oriented memory ====
A well known study used to show early signs of recall memory, examines 3 month old infants behavior with mobiles. The experiment entailed tying a string on a colourful mobile to the infant's foot, so that kicking would cause the mobile to move, pleasing the baby. After the initial training, it was shown that a week later the infants kicked in order to produce movement. Two weeks later the infant resumed the kicking behavior after a short reminder session where they watched the mobile moving (unattached to their foot). This experiment showed a recognition of the mobile, as well as recall (after one week), and cued recall (after 2 weeks). Recognition and recall are two essential aspects of memory; these are particularly useful in children since verbal reporting of memory may not be available yet or as reliable when testing very young participants. At the age of approximately 9 months some infants are able to reproduce some simple actions they observe up to 24 hours after witnessing them. The reproduction of behaviors such as choosing one object over another or repeatedly placing an object in a certain spot is a type of situational memory test used to identify the child's level of memory capability. Deferred imitation, the ability to reproduce behaviour without cuing, can be seen and tested near the age of 18– 24 months. Children become able to replicate more complex events with greater detail, from memory.

Jean Piaget, a child development psychologist, conducted a study testing the cognitive and memory abilities of children around 2 years of age. These tests were conducted using objects presented to the child followed by their removal from sight. This causes very young infants to believe the object no longer exists. At approximately 8–12 months, children will look for the missing object and this display shows memory, as well as a comprehension that it still exists when it is not directly seen. This led to the theory of object permanence which demonstrates the stage at which memory and cognitive development have reached the level of mental representation.

==== Facial recognition ====
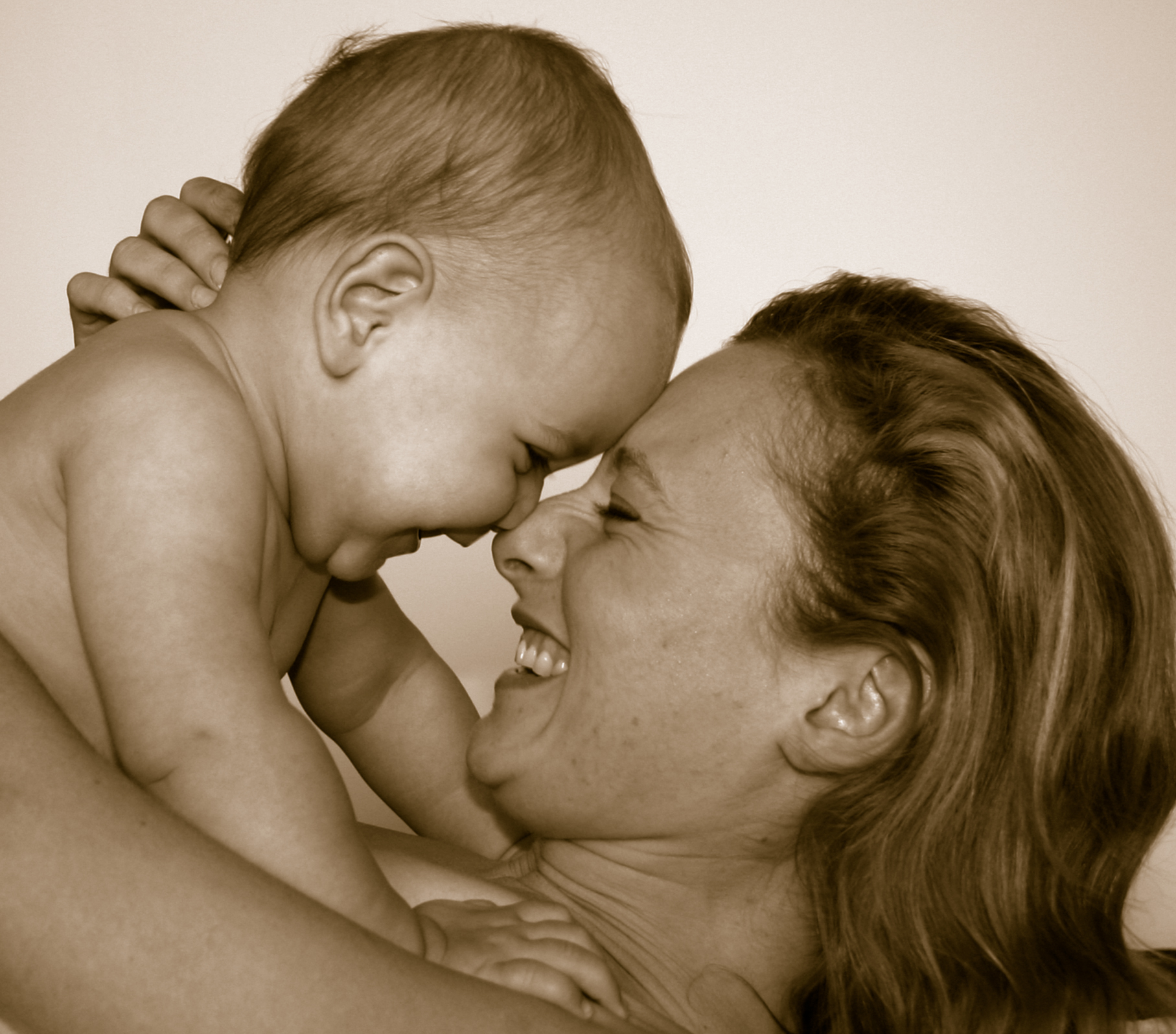
Recognition of a motherly face.

A child as early as 7 days old can shows signs of facial expression imitation such as tongue or lip protrusion and opening of their mouth. There is some debate as to whether this is a voluntary or reflexive action though the ability to imitate demonstrates the infants ability to encode the image and imitate it. Evidence of facial memory over longer delays can be seen in children as early as 2–3 weeks old. Changes in behavior such as crying less and smiling more shows evidence for recognition of a familiar face.

Recognition can also be shown with habituation, the process of attending a familiar stimuli less in preference for a new one. This can be seen as early as 5 months of age in several forms including auditory and visual identification. In a study of 8-10 month infants, both familiar objects/faces and newly presented ones were introduced at different intervals and time delays. Looking time and first looks were recorded, and the results indicated habituation and memory recall.

==== False memories ====
Accuracy of memory is an important factor when studying memory in children as it has been demonstrated that children's memory more susceptible to suggesting and implanting of false memories than adults. In a study on preschoolers, using a questionnaire method in a yes/no and multiple choice format, the result of forcing an answer in response to a controlled situation differed according to question style. The children showed a preference to saying 'yes' to 'no' and showed an equal preference for the multiple choice (when neither were correct), neither are an ideal test for memory accuracy in children. The Criterion-Based Content Analysis (CBCA) is designed to decipher truthful from false memories in children and is a part of the Statement Validity Analysis (SVA) which consists of structured interviews, systematic analysis of verbal statements and statement validity checklist. This is a comprehensive protocol that tests the reliability of a child witness's memory of an event or situation which relies on the assumption that false memories are of weaker quality then truthful and accurate memories.

Recognition memory in a legal setting is also different in children than in adults. In a meta-analysis study a line-up style test was used for a child witness to identify a culprit among other suspects. The results show that children over the age of 5 were able to identify a culprit (when the culprit was present) at a comparable rate to adults but children up to age 14 produced far greater number of false identifications when the culprit was not present. It was speculated by Pozzulo & Lindsay that false positives were caused by an inability to produce correct absolute judgments (recall) while relative judgments (recognition) are more successful.

=== Technologies ===
High resolution fMRI of the human brain.

Cognitive neuroscience aims to reduce cognition to its neural basis using new technologies such as fMRI, repetitive transcranial magnetic stimulation (rTMS) and Magnetoencephalography (MEG) as well as older methods such as Positron emission tomography (PET) and Electroencephalography (EEG) studies. Due to the correlational designs used in fMRI, many scientists have coined this up and coming field as the new phrenology in the sense that techniques such as fMRI rely heavily on complex statistics. Type 1 errors can lead scientists to draw premature and incorrect causal relationships if improper designs are used.

=== Ethics ===
Human subject research must be carefully designed as to not have any adverse effects on the subject, and not impose on their rights as a human being. Neurological procedures that intentionally lesion the brain are illegal, and therefore those who have already obtained brain damage must be studied. The study of brain damaged patients has its drawbacks, however case studies of brain injured patients has greatly improved our understanding of the neural basis of memory.

All subjects (or their legal representative) must have a clear understanding of the experimental procedure, including any potential dangers to themself, and be in a right state of mind to express consent to the researcher before any tests can be started.

The American Psychological Association uses a strict ethical code concerning research in psychology.

=== Experimental designs ===
A major complication that is raised in memory research is its fallible nature in humans. Having the ability to recall memories does not necessarily mean they are accurate. Our ability to store and process what is going on around us relies on memory being a constructive, fallible process. The technologies explained above may show areas of activation associated with certain behaviors, but without any idea of lesion location, it is difficult to pinpoint exactly what part of the brain relates to which behavioral deficits observed. Neuropsychologists have created various tasks designed to assess specific types of memory so that inferences about lesion location can be drawn from poor performances on these tests. Neuropsychological tests can aid us in understanding specific types of memory associated with specific sites of brain damage.

==== Corsi block tapping ====
An assessment of visual-spatial memory involves mimicking a researcher as he/she taps nine identical spatially separated blocks. The sequence starts out simple, usually using two blocks, but becomes more complex until the subject's performance suffers. This number is known as the Corsi Span, and averages about 5 for normal human subjects. An fMRI study involving subjects undergoing this test revealed that while the sequence length increases, general brain activity remains the same. So while humans may show encoding difficulty, this is not related to overall brain activation. Whether able to perform the task well or not the ventrolateral prefrontal cortex is highly involved. Corsi blocks tasks with a normal forward order requires support from the visuospatial sketch pad, but not from the phonological loop. When the sequence to be recalled becomes longer than three or four items, central executive resources are used

== Animal subjects ==
The study of memory has greatly benefited from experimentation with animals. Current ethical guidelines state that using animals for scientific purposes is only acceptable when the harm (physical or psychological) done to animals is outweighed by the benefits of the research. Keeping this in mind, we can use research techniques on animals that would not necessarily be performed on humans.

=== Basic research ===
Knockout mouse breeding scheme.

Our understanding of memory has benefited greatly from animal research. Animals brains can be selectively lesioned using surgical, or neurotoxic methods and be assessed before and after the experimental manipulation. Groundbreaking new technology has allowed for genetic manipulation and the creation of knockout mice. Scientists genetically engineer these mice to lack functionally or behaviourally important alleles or have missing or altered gene sequences. Careful observation of behaviors and phenotypes may help uncover the neural substrates of memory and prove to be an essential tool for the study of gene-behaviour interactions.

=== Genetics ===
Animals can be selectively bred for certain behavioural characteristics, such as having strong maze-solving skills. Although the genetic underpinnings of observable phenotypes are extremely difficult to show, behavioural characteristics can be selectively bred. The difficulty lies in the subjective determination of the phenotype. How can one show that an animal has a good memory? There are many confounds when breeding for behaviours, however if animals can be selected for memory and learning ability, maybe we can learn something about how genes contribute to memory systems.

=== Technologies ===
Functional magnetic resonance imaging (fMRI) has intriguing implications for the study of memory in humans, however it can also be used in animal models. fMRI can be used to assess brain functionality in monkeys in the context of a variety of behavioral tasks. Structural MRI can be used to examine the extent and location of brain lesions, so that behavioral abnormalities observed can be directly linked to specific brain structures. High-resolution fMRI can help locate and assess the functionality of large neural networks so that these regions can be further studied using more traditional electrophysiological recording devices.

Single-unit recording directly measures action potentials and can be used in a variety of animals. This technique employed in the macaque monkey led to the discovery of the mirror neuron which has major implications for learning, memory and the perception of self. Single cell recordings can be used to record the activity of single neurons while animals perform tasks related to memory.

Cortical cooling is a relatively new technique that allows for a temporary disruption of function in a chosen area of the brain. Due to the use of large, surgically implanted devices this technique is generally used on primates, however the use of small cryotip implants has implications for use in rats. This exciting new technology allows for reversible lesions, which removes variations between animals so that better causal relationships can be shown. Animals can act as their own controls and this is ideal for any neuroscientific research.

The neurotoxic lesion technique has proven to be essential for studying the neural basis of behavior and memory in animals. Neurotoxins can be used to selectively damage very specific nerve tracts in the brain. Pertaining to the study of memory, areas of interest include the hippocampus, the rhinal cortex, the pre-frontal cortex, and the frontal cortex. The neurotoxic lesion technique uses neurotoxins such as ibotenic acid to selectively disrupt or kill specific neural tracts in any of the areas described above. The animal is anaesthetized and immobilized so that stereotaxic instruments can be used to drill holes in specific locations of the skull. Scientists can then carefully administer microinjections of neurotoxins to damage only the neurons in specific brain areas. This technique allows for the selective lesioning of areas of interest and leaves surrounding supportive tissue unaffected.

=== Advantages ===
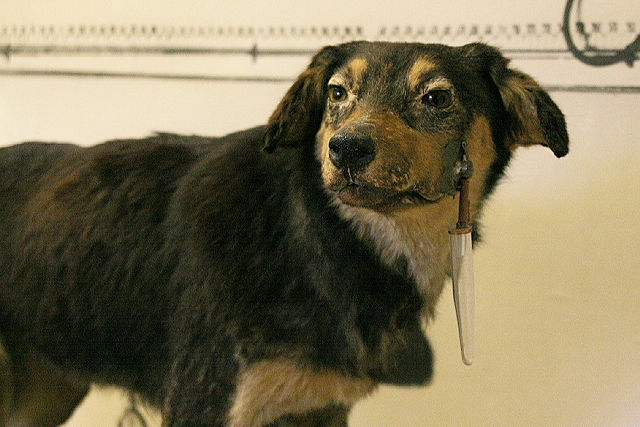
A dog in a pavlovian study.

Research animals are a good substitute for humans because similar principles are assumed to underlie basic mechanisms of brain function. In order to fully understand human memory, cross-species comparisons in neuropsychology are used so that multiple variables can be manipulated. The more experimental control we have, the easier it is to eliminate confounding variables, and better causal conclusions can be made.

Although there is no single ideal animal model of a human, for each problem of interest there is an animal upon which it can be most conveniently studied. For example, the study of spatial memory has benefitted greatly from experimentation and observation of food caching birds. To study auditory learning and memory, songbirds can be used. To study more complex systems such as motor learning, object recognition, short term memory and working memory, often primates such as the macaque monkey are used because of their large brains and more sophisticated intelligence. Small rodents can be used to study aversive conditioning and emotional memory, and contextual/spatial memory. To reduce memory and learning to its genetic basis, mice can be genetically modified and studied. Generally animal studies depend on the principles of positive reinforcement, aversion techniques and Pavlovian conditioning. This type of research is extremely useful and has shed much light on learning and memory in humans.

=== Experimental designs ===
Scientific reductionism has pushed our understanding of memory closer to the neural level. In order to broaden our understanding, we need to draw conclusions from converging evidence. Studying memory in animals such as birds, rodents, and primates is difficult because scientists can only study and quantify observable behaviors. Animal research relies on carefully constructed methodologies, and these are species specific.

A major obstacle to research on the innateness of memory is the scarcity of subjects with apparent superior memory quality to make up a sample from which statistically significant conclusions can be drawn. One solution to this was the brainchild of memory researcher and methodologist, Dr Peter Marshall.The Great Memory Show was a series of events where memory performers were invited to show off their memory abilities to a live audience, in front of TV cameras, but the real motive was to attract a pool of people who may have naturally superior memory quality, to take part in memory research at Royal Holloway, University of London.

==== Primates ====
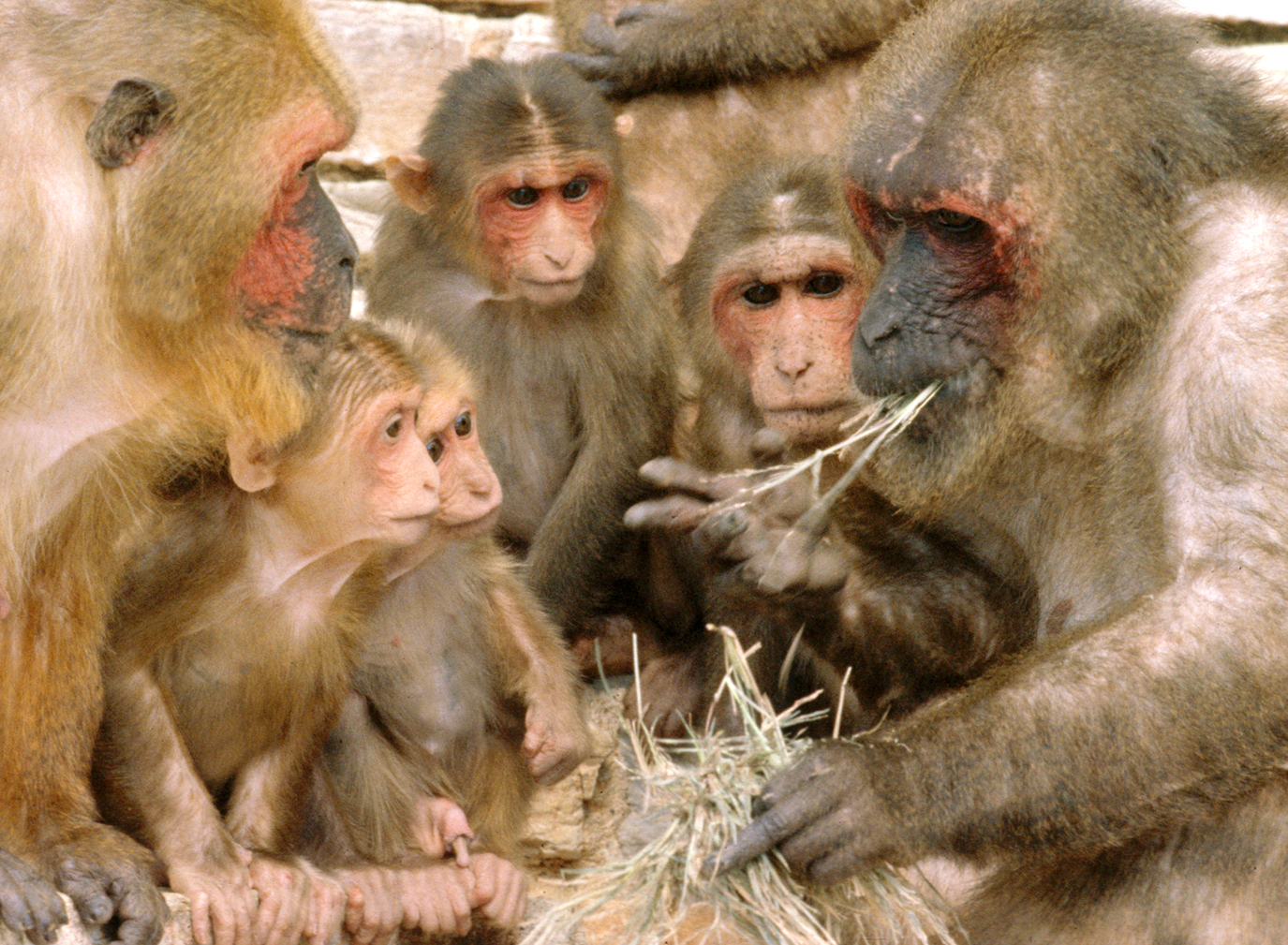
Macaques of the primate genus.

The textbook Fundamentals of Human Neuropsychology by Kolb and Whishaw describes some designs used to study memory in the macaque monkey. Elizabeth Murray and her colleagues trained monkeys to reach through the bars of their cage after a brief delay in order to displace objects under which a reward may be located. During the brief delay the monkey had to use either object recognition memory, or contextual memory to remember where the reward was located. Object recognition is tested with a matching-to-sample task where the monkey had to remember visual characteristics of the object in order to obtain the reward. Alternatively, in the non-matching-to-sample design the monkey must remember the location of the previously seen object. The monkey must then use context and spatial memory in order to correctly displace an object in the same location as previous, in order to obtain the food reward. These two tasks can be used to differentiate between object recognition memory and contextual memory. Murray and her colleagues were able to show that hippocampal lesions impaired contextual memory whereas rhinal cortex lesions impaired object recognition memory. This experimental design allowed for the dissociation of two mutually exclusive brain regions devoted to specific types of memory.

In experiments with the macaque monkey, Earl Miller and his colleagues used the delayed matching to sample (DMS) task to assess working memory in monkeys. The monkey was required to fixate on a computer screen while coloured images were displayed serially for 0.5 seconds, and separated by a one-second delay. The first image shown was the sample, and the monkey was trained to pull a lever when the sample object was shown a second time. In this experiment single-cell recordings were taken from the prefrontal cortex, an area thought to be involved with working memory. In order to verify the location of the recording device, MRI and stereotaxic instruments were used. The ability to use single cell recordings solely for experimental purposes is exclusive to animal testing and has greatly increased our understanding of memory systems.

==== Caching birds ====
Comparisons of the neuroanatomy of caching and non-caching birds has shed light on the neural basis of spatial memory. David Sherry and his colleagues devised experiments using the displacement of landmarks, to show that caching birds rely on spatial memory and landmark cues to find their caches, and local changes in cache appearance had no effect on food retrieval. They were able to show that changes in neurogenesis are directly related to food storing behavior. Food caching behavior reaches a maximum in August, continues through the winter and declines in the spring. They showed that the amount of neurons added to the hippocampus was also at a max during August and winter, and declined into the spring. Using selective hippocampal lesions, cause-effect relationships were shown. Lesions disrupted cache retrieval and other spatial behavior, however had no effect on actual food caching. The hippocampus has been implicated as a key structure for spatial memory in humans, and studying behavior in food caching birds and other animals has been extremely influential on this view. Sherry and his colleagues were also able to show that food-caching birds have much larger hippocampus' than non food-caching birds. Without techniques such as cell labeling, neuronal staining and careful post mortem analysis, these comparison studies would be impossible.

==== Songbirds ====
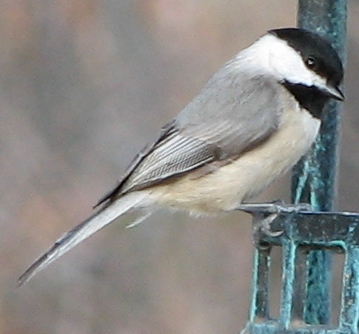
A Carolina chickadee, a common songbird.

Songbirds are excellent animal models for studying learning and auditory memory. These birds have highly developed vocal organs, which give them the ability to create diverse and elaborate birdsongs. Neurotoxic lesions can be used to study how specific brain structures are key for this type of learning and scientists can also manipulate the environment in which these birds are raised. In addition, with functional MRI the response to different auditory stimuli has been studied in vivo. In experiments with songbirds, using these two methodologies has led to very interesting discoveries about auditory learning and memory. Much like humans, birds have a critical period when they must be exposed to adult birdsong. The cognitive systems of vocal production and auditory recognition parallel those in humans, and experiments have shown that there are critical brain structures for these processes.

==== Rodents ====
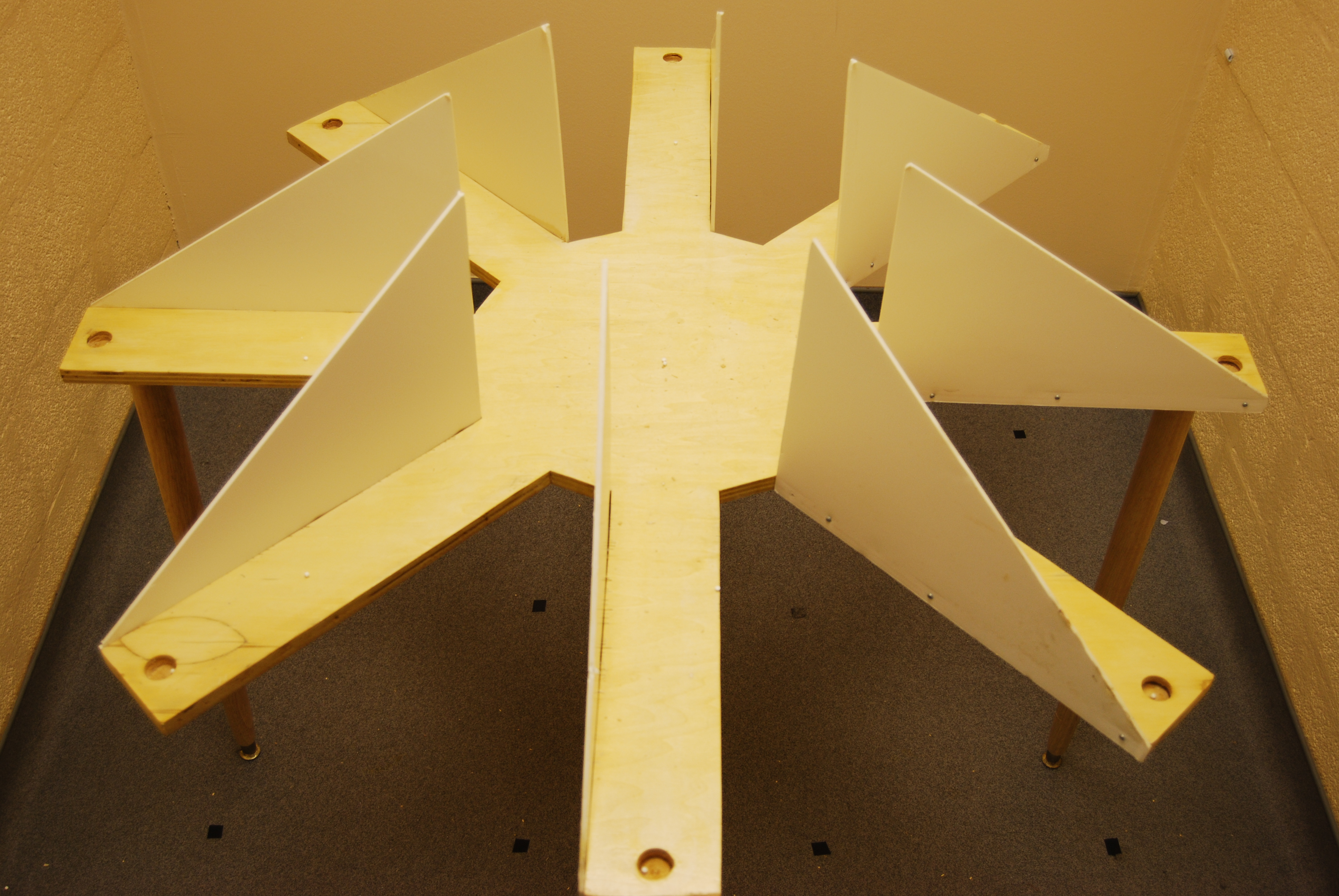
A simple radial maze.

Rodents are small mammals capable of learning, displaying complex behaviors, and are relatively inexpensive to raise. They are an ideal animal to use for the study of memory. The assessment of learning and memory in rodents has been employed in scientific research for a long time, and there are many experimental methods used. Generally tests of spatial memory employ maze designs where the rodent must run a maze in order to receive a food reward. Learning can be shown when the rodent reduces its average number of errors or wrong turns. Aversive techniques such as the Morris Water Maze can also be used to study spatial memory. The rat is placed in murky water surrounded by sheer walls containing spatial cues. Learning is shown when the rat swims a more direct route to the obscured platform. Small rodents can also be easily conditioned using taste aversion or odor aversion techniques. Performing neurotoxic lesions in these conditioned rodents is an excellent way to study the neural basis of aversion learning and memory.

=== Converging evidence ===
Psychologists who work with animals assume that the things they learn can be applied to the human brain. Memory is a complex system that relies on interactions between many distinct parts of the brain. In order to fully understand memory, researchers must cumulate evidence from human, animal, and developmental research in order to make broad theories about how memory works. Intraspecies comparisons are key. Rats for example display extremely complex behaviours and most of the structures in their brain parallel those in humans. Due to their relatively simple organization, slugs can be useful for studying how neurons interconnect to produce observable behaviour. Fruit flies are useful for studying gene-behaviour interactions because many generations with genetic alterations can be quickly bred in the laboratory.
