= Jean-Marie Plum =

Belgian composer and organist

Jean-Marie Plum (30 June 1899, in Liège – 28 March 1944, in Brussels) was a Belgian composer and organist.

== Life ==
Born in Liège, Plum studied philosophy at the Diocesan Seminary and later attended the music class of Lucien Mawet (1875-1947). He was ordered priest in 1927 and became organist Order of Servants of Mary in Brussels. He left an important production of sacred and organ music (196 opus numbers).

== Compositions ==
=== Sacred Music ===
- Hymnus Septem S.S. Fundatorum, Op. 10
- Missa tertia in honorem Sancti Joannis Apostoli et Evangelistae, Op. 25
- Missa Exsultet, à 3 voix égales et orgue, Op. 70
- Missa Gloria Laus, à 2 voix mixtes, Op. 72
- Tria motecta, 1 vocis comitante organo, Op. 75
- Te Deum, pour 3 voix égales et grand orgue, Op. 82
- Messe de Pâques, pour orgue ou harmonium, Op. 89
- Missa Lauda Sion, à trois voix mixtes sans orgue, Op. 90
- Deux Motets, à 2 voix égales, Op. 91
- Messe de Noël, à 2 voix mixtes, Op. 95
- Ergo sum, motet pour Messe des défunts à une voix, orgue et violoncelle ad libitum, Op. 96
- Missa Vexilla Regis, 2 vocum aequalium cum organo, Op. 100
- Missa Pange Lingua, ad tres voces aequales, organo comitante, Op. 106
- 7 Cantica Eucharistica (I. Ave Verum, II. O quam suavis, III. O sacrum convivium, IV. Panis Angelicus, V. O salutaris, VI. Adoro te, VII. O Esca viatorum), Op. 107
- 7 Laudes mariales (Ave Maria, Beatam me dicent, Recordare, Inviolata, Sub tuum, Tota pulchra, O gloriosa), Op. 112
- In honorem Coredemptricis Generis Humani: Magnificat, Op. 113
- In honorem Coredemptricis Generis Humani: Stabat Mater, Op. 114
- Ad laudes vespertinas, 4 motetta tribus vocibus aequalibus comitante organo, Op. 116
- Missa facillima ad unam vel duas voces aequales, Op. 118
- 7 Tantum ergo à une voix, Op. 119
- Cantique de communion, Op. 121
- Missa Crux fidelis, tribus vocibus æqualibus, comitante Organo, Op. 125
- Laudate Dominum in chordis et organo, motettum 4 vocum in-vel aequalium cum organo, Op. 132
- Pie Pellicane, Tota pulcra, ad duas voces aequales comitante organo, Op. 135
- Laudate pueri, ad duas voces aequales comitante organo, Op. 136
- Missa Alleluia, ad 4 voces mixtas sine organo, Op. 137
- Missa Ubi caritas et amor, ad 2 voces mixtas cum organo, Op. 143
- Cantique à la Vierge Marie, Op. 159
- Missa Salve Regina, à deux voix égales et orgue, Op. 160
- 2.ème Salut, à 3 voix égales et orgue (I. Ave verum, II. Sub tuum praesidium, III. Tantum ergo, IV. Lauda Sion), Op. 162
- 5.ème Salut, à 2 voix égales et orgue (I. Homo quidam, II. Ave Maria, III. Tantum ergo, IV. Laudate Dominum), Op. 163
- Missa Regina servorum tuorum, pour 3 voix égales et orgue, Op. 167
- Magnificat, Op. 172
- 6. ème Salut, à 2 voix égales [et orgue] ( I. Panis angelicus, II. O quot undis, III. Tantum ergo, IV. Memorare), Op. 179
- Stabat Mater, soloists, choir, organ, Op. 192

=== Organ Music ===
- Trois pieces pour grand orgue, Op. 30
- Fantaisie, pour grand orgue, Op. 46
- Sursum corda, pour grand orgue, Op. 53
- Messe de mariage, trois pièces pour harmonium, Op. 56
- Toccata, pour grand orgue, Op. 59
- Lauda Sion, pour grand orgue, Op. 64
- Marche héroïque, pour grand orgue, Op. 77
- Messe breve, pour orgue ou harmonium, Op. 79
- Scherzando, pour grand orgue, Op. 81
- Pièce funèbre, pour grand orgue, Op. 83
- Etude concertante, pour le pédalier, Op. 88
- 20 Sorties ou Versets, pour orgue ou harmonium, Op. 103
- 20 Elévations ou communions, pour orgue ou harmonium, Op. 104
- 20 Offertoires, pour orgue ou harmonium, Op. 105
- Sortie sur un thème de choral, pour grand orgue, Op. 108
- Symphonie eucharistique, pour grand orgue, Op. 115
- Clementissime Domine, pour grand orgue, Op. 124
- Procession, pour grand orgue, Op. 126
- 3.ème offertoire sur trois noëls, pour orgue ou harmonium, Op. 134
- Introduction, Variations et Final sur le Stabat Mater traditionel, pour grand orgue, Op.138
- Entrée Pontificale, pour grand orgue, Op.149
- Regnavit Dominus, pour grand orgue, Op.150
- Toccata no. 2, pour grand orgue, Op.152
- Toccata no. 3 (Big-Ben), pour grand orgue, Op.154
- Triptyque, pour grand orgue, Op. 158
- Via Crucis, pour grand orgue, Op. 168
- Symphonie Nuptiale, pour grand orgue, Op. 170
- Suite brève, pour Orgue ou Harmonium, Op. 173
- Etude concertante, pour le pédalier ou grande orgue, Op. 188
- Entrée. Improvisation sur un Cantique de Profession, pour grand orgue, Op. 196 (posthume).

=== Piano Music ===
- Tryptique (I. Allegretto, II. Adagio, III. Allegro vivace), pour piano, Op. 78
- Roumont, suite pittoresque pour piano, Op. 97
- Impromptu-Lied, Op. 142
- Chant pastoral pour piano, Op. 147

== Sources ==
- Biographie de Jean-Marie Plum
- Lebrun A., ofm, Le Père Jean-Marie Plum, Bruxelles, Éditions du Chant d’Oiseau, 1945.
- Gallé P., osm, Un amant de la Beauté éternelle: le frère Jean-Marie Plum, in Monte Senario, n. 6 (settembre-dicembre 1998), pp. 34–40.
