= Emile Brichard =

Belgian cyclist (1899–2004)

Personal information
- Born: 20 December 1899 Arsimont, Belgium
- Died: 8 July 2004 (aged 104) Villers-Poterie, Belgium

Cycling career
- Sport: Cycling
- Discipline: Road
- Role: Rider

Emile Brichard (Arsimont, 20 December 1899 – Villers-Poterie, 8 July 2004) was a Belgian cyclist. Brichard participated in the Tour de France in 1926, and was also known for being the penultimate surviving Belgian veteran of World War I.

== Life ==
During World War I, Brichard escaped together with his parents to Wolverhampton in the United Kingdom, where he went to work in a factory producing soldiers boots. He joined the British Army in 1915, joining the medical corps, serving at De Panne.

After the war, Brichard went to work as a miner, and started to pursue cycling in his leisure time, where he mainly participated in local cycling competitions in the Namur and Henegouwen provinces of Belgium. Although he became a skilled cyclist, a competition victory would continuously elude him. In 1926 he joined the 'Alcyon-Dunlop cycling crew as an assistant to Adelin Benoît.

Brichard was selected for the 1926 Tour de France, which would enter the history books as the longest ever edition of the race. Brichard had to abandon the tour in the first stage from Évian-les-Bains to Mulhouse, due to a leaking tyre, as he had already consumed all his spare tyres. He continued to race for a few more years, while also continuing to work in the mines. In 1930 he retired from both cycling and the mining industry, and opened his own liqueur and wine distillery and shop.

Brichard remained anonymous until the start of the 21st century, when he was discovered to be one of few remaining survivors of the first World War. In 2004 he was interviewed as the oldest living Tour de France participant, in connection with that years tour which included the south of Belgium and even passed his own home town of Villers-Poterie. He died just a few days after the tour had exited Belgium.
