= Jean Hénault =

Belgian high jumper

Personal information
- Nationality: Belgian
- Born: 25 November 1898 Herve, Belgium
- Died: 14 November 1983 (aged 84)

Sport
- Sport: Athletics
- Event: High jump

Jean Hénault (25 November 1898 – 14 November 1983) was a Belgian athlete. He competed in the men's high jump at the 1920 Summer Olympics and the 1924 Summer Olympics.
