= Auguste Pelsmaeker =

Belgian footballer

Personal information
- Date of birth: 15 November 1899
- Place of birth: Antwerp, Belgium
- Date of death: 19 November 1976 (aged 77)

International career
Years	Team	Apps	(Gls)
- Belgium

Auguste Pelsmaeker (15 November 1899 – 19 November 1976) was a Belgian footballer. He competed in the men's tournament at the 1924 Summer Olympics.
