= Eugène-François de Block =

Belgian painter

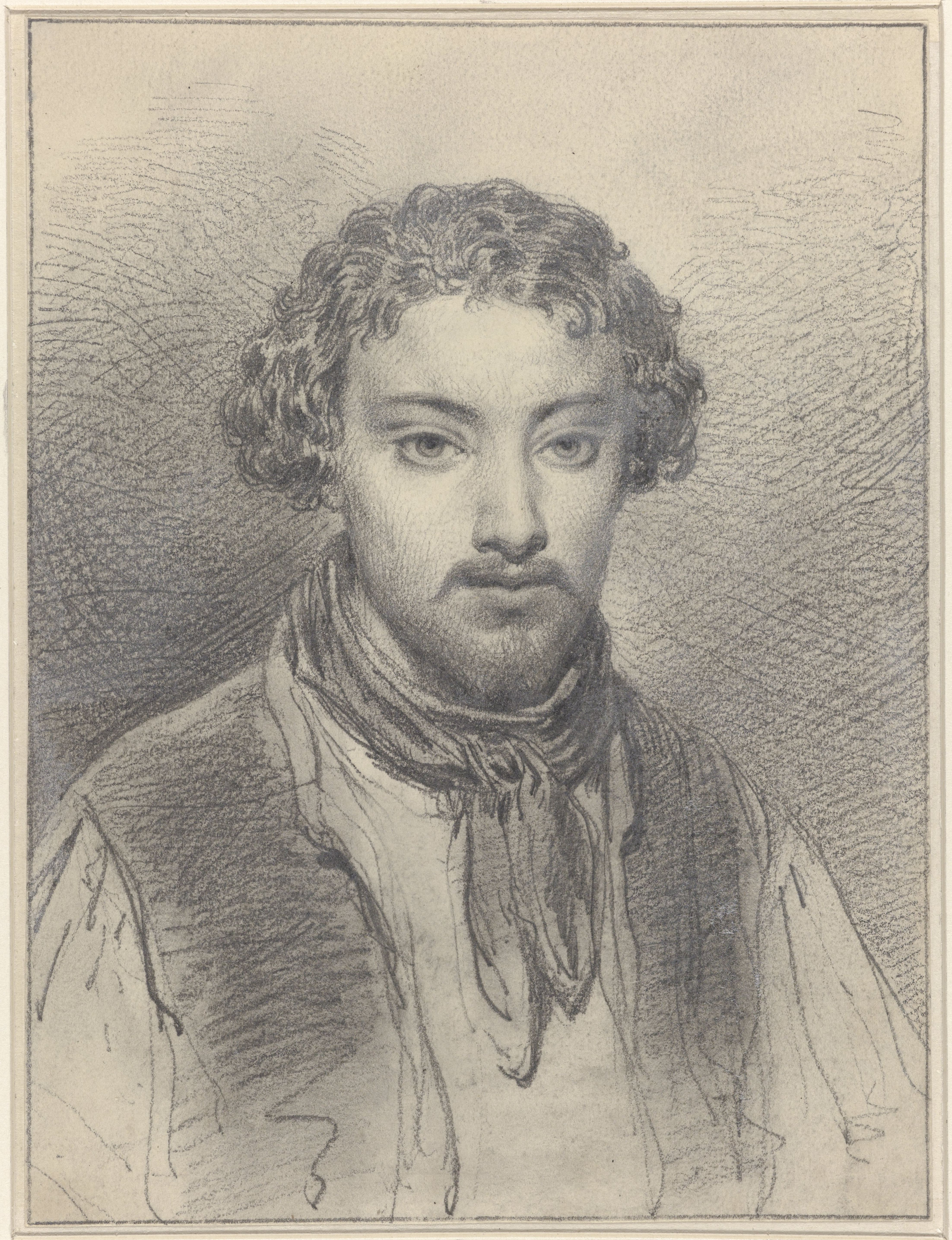
Self-portrait (1830s)

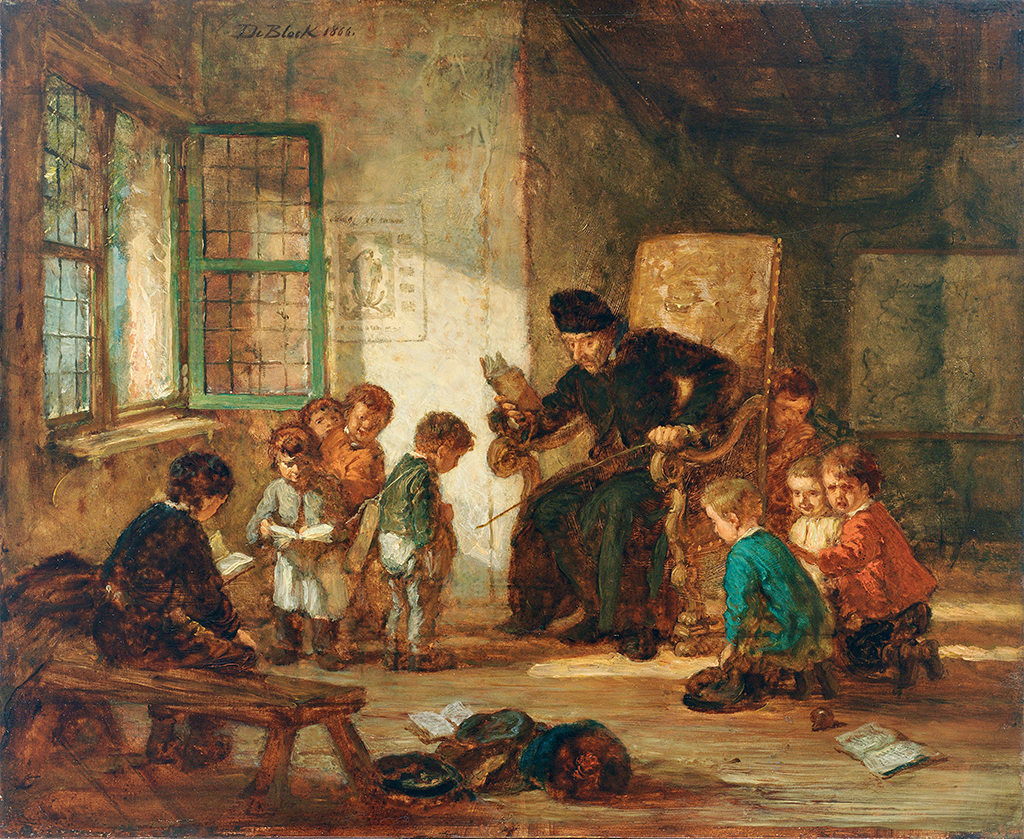
Teacher with Elementary School Class

Eugène-François de Block (14 May 1812, in Geraardsbergen – 23 January 1893, in Antwerp) was a Belgian genre painter, etcher and draftsman.

== Biography ==
He received his first art education at the Tekenschool in Geraardsbergen. Later, he became a student of the history painter, Pierre Van Huffel. After 1834, he lived in Antwerp, where he completed his artistic training with Ferdinand de Braekeleer.

At first, he was heavily influenced by De Braekeleer's work but, around 1860, broke free and developed his own, more refined use of color. His early works were mostly humorous in nature, but he later moved into genre scenes, interiors, portraits and even religiously-themed works.

One of his students was the German painter, Ludwig von Hagn, who worked with him at his studios in Antwerp and Brussels. Edmond De Schampheleer was another one of his better known students.

He served as Curator for the Royal Museum of Fine Arts Antwerp from 1885 to 1891.

His works may be seen there, at museums in Brussels and Liège and at the Rijksmuseum in Amsterdam, which owns sixty-seven of his works.

== Sources ==
- Berko, Patrick; Berko, Viviane, Dictionary of Belgian painters born between 1750 & 1875; Brussel : Laconti, 1981
- Flippo, Willem G., Lexicon of the Belgian romantic painters; Antwerpen : International Art Press, 1981
- Allgemeines Künstlerlexikon : die bildenden Künstler aller Zeiten und Völker [Saur]
- P. Piron, De Belgische beeldende kunstenaars uit de 19de en 20ste eeuw; uitgeverij Art in Belgium (1999), ISBN 90-76676-01-1
