= Jacqueline Dyris =

American actress

Jacqueline Alexandra Dyris (February 28, 1899 in Belgium – March 14, 1962 in Los Angeles, California) was a petite stage actress and silent film star, a native of Brussels, Belgium. Her father was of English and Dutch descent and her mother was Spanish and French. Jacqueline was educated in Europe and later Montreal, Quebec, Canada, Chicago, Illinois, and New York, New York.

== Career ==
She was initially associated with Jack Norworth of Norworth and Bayes in Odds and Ends. Soon she participated in several vaudeville sketches. She relocated from New York to California for health reasons in the early 1920s. In 1925 the actress appeared in the stage play, White Collars. The play continued more than a year at the Egan Theater in Los Angeles, California.

== Movies ==
Jacqueline's most noted movies are The Man Who Saw Tomorrow (1922) and The Godless Girl (1929). The latter was directed by Cecil B. Demille and starred Marie Prevost, Noah Beery, George Duryea, and Lina Basquette. She acted with Ina Claire in The Awful Truth (1929).
