= Edmond De Schampheleer =

Belgian painter (1824–1899)

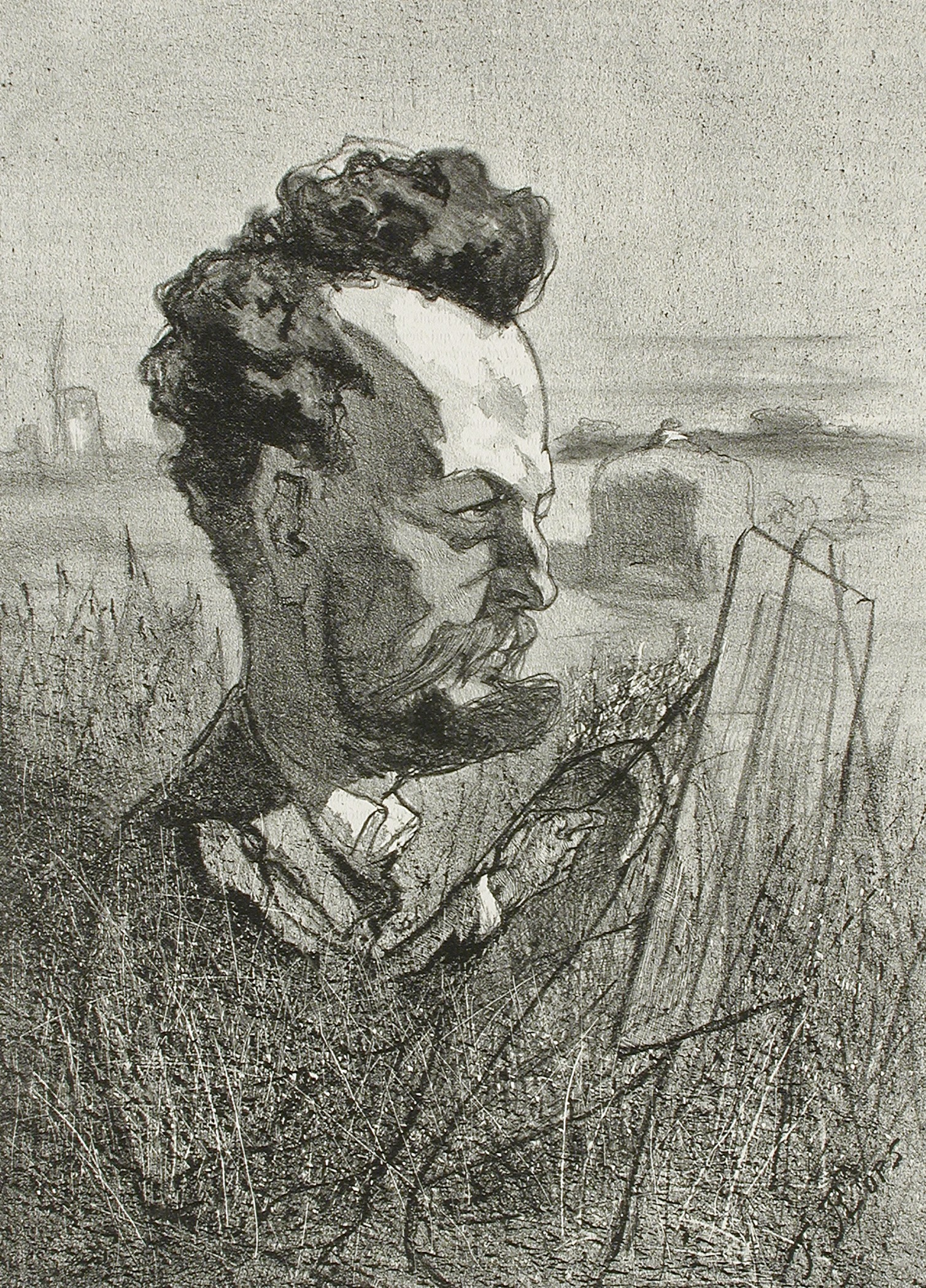
Edmond Schampheleer, by Félicien Rops, 1857

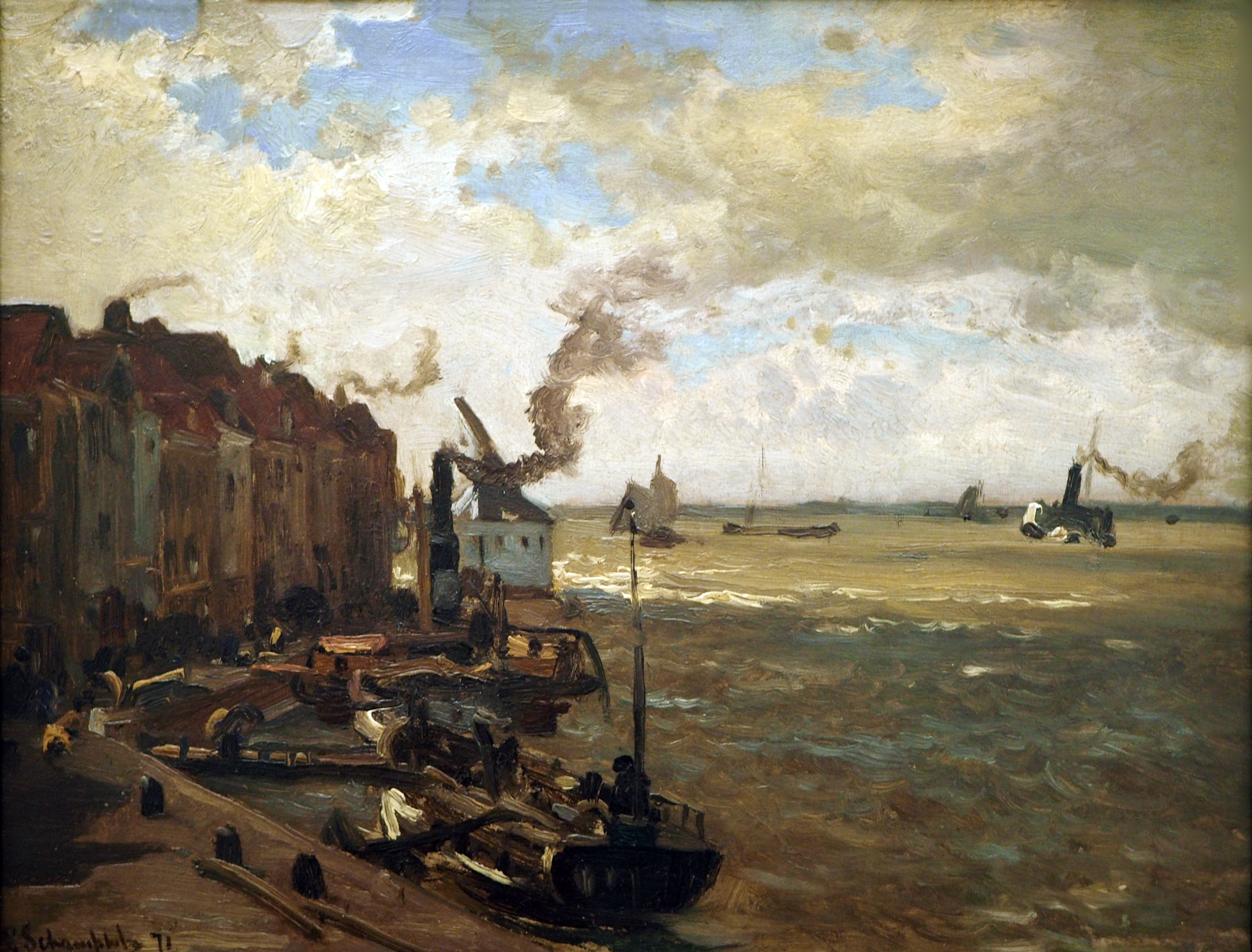
On the Quay at Nijmegen

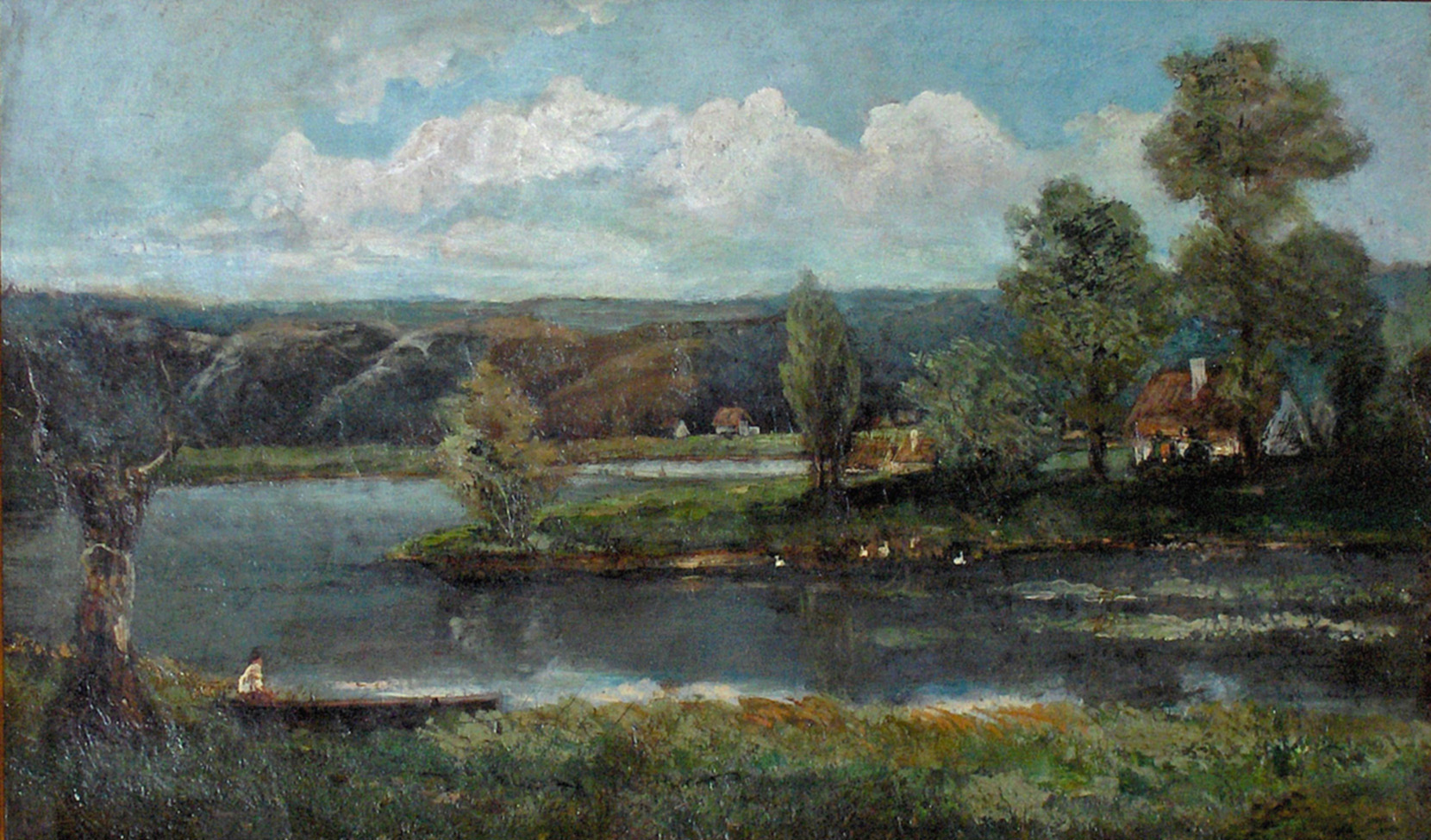
Landscape with River

Edmond De Schampheleer (21 July 1824, in Brussels – 12 March 1899, in Molenbeek-Saint-Jean) was a Belgian landscape painter and engraver.

== Biography ==
After completing his studies with Eugène-François de Block in Antwerp, he set himself up as a landscape painter; taking a realistic approach, derived from Théodore Fourmois and the French artists of the Barbizon School. He also combined plein aire techniques with large-scale painting in his studio.

He undertook a number of journeys in search of motifs; visiting Bavaria, the Netherlands and France, where he associated with the artists in Barbizon. It would appear, however, that his favorite area was Oosterbeek in Gelderland; a site where many painters congregated. His style increasingly came to resemble that of the 17th century Dutch artists. He also liked to paint in the vicinity of Genk. There, together with Théodore Baron, Fourmois, Alphonse Asselbergs, Edmond Tschaggeny and Franz Courtens, he was part of what came to be known as the Genkse School.

He was a close friend of the animal painter, Edmond De Pratere. His students included Clemens Van den Broeck (1843-1922) and Euphrosine Beernaert. The works of Louis Pulinckx (1843-1910) display his influence.

Together with Charles de Groux, Henri-Joseph Duwée (1810-1884), Félicien Rops, Camille van Camp and Otto Von Thoren, he illustrated the Contes Brabançons, by Charles De Coster. Later, he was also one of the illustrators for De Coster's Les Légendes Flamandes.

In 1869, he was named a Knight in the Order of Leopold.

== Sources ==
- Patrick & Viviane Berko, Dictionnaire des peintres belges nés entre 1750 et 1875, Laconti, Brussels, 1981
- Willem Flippo, Lexicon of the Belgian Romantic Painters, Ruygrok, Antwerp, 1981
- Norbert Hostyn, "Edmond De Schampheleer", in: Nationaal Biografisch Woordenboek, vol.14, Koninklijke Vlaamse Academie, 1992.
- Wim & Greet Pas, Biografisch Lexicon Plastische Kunst in België. Schilders- beeldhouwers grafici 1830-2000, Arto, 2000 ISBN 978-90-7613-802-2
- Paul Piron, Dictionnaire des artistes plasticiens de Belgique des XIXe et XXe siècles, Lasne, 2003 ISBN 978-2-930338-53-8
- Kristof Reulens, et al., Genk door schildersogen. Landschapsschilders in de Limburgse Kempen 1850-1950, Davidsfonds, 2010 ISBN 978-90-582-6749-8
