= Maurice De Wulf =

Belgian Thomist philosopher and professor (1867–1947)

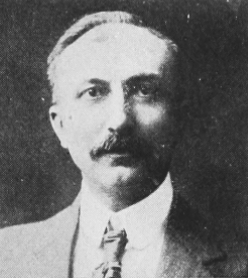
- Born: Maurice Marie Charles Joseph De Wulf; 6 April 1867; Poperinghe, Belgium
- Died: 23 December 1947 (aged 80); Poperinghe, Belgium
- Education: Catholic University of Leuven
- Occupation: Philosopher

Maurice Marie Charles Joseph De Wulf (6 April 1867 – 23 December 1947), was a Belgian Thomist philosopher, professor of philosophy at the Catholic University of Leuven, was one of the pioneers of the historiography of medieval philosophy. His book History of Medieval Philosophy appeared first in 1900 and was followed by many other editions and translations.

== Life and work ==
Maurice Marie Charles Joseph De Wulf was born at Poperinghe, Belgium on 6 April 1867. He studied at the Catholic University of Leuven, where he became a Doctor of Thomistic Theology. He taught the history of medieval philosophy, logic, and criteriology. He was named an honorary president of the 1911 International Congress of Philosophy.

During the 1920s he taught at Harvard and his Philosophy and Civilization in the Middle Ages was published at Princeton in 1922. He was a Knight of the Order of Leopold, and a member of the Imperial and Royal Academy of Brussels, and the Administrative Council of the Royal Library of Belgium. De Wulf contributed articles relative to philosophy to the Catholic Encyclopedia.

Very early it was noted that "In his Histoire de la Philosophie Médievale, Mr. de Wulf departs from the common view which identifies Scholasticism with Mediaeval philosophy, and discovers in the Middle Ages two antithetical currents: Scholasticism proper, represented by Thomas Aquinas, Duns Scotus, Albert the Great, etc.; and anti-Scholasticism, of which Scotus Erigena is the father, and which is continued by the Catharists, the Albigenses and the Pantheistic schools. Mr. de Wulf's view on this point has not met with a ready acceptance. It has been rejected, among others, by Elie Blanc and Picavet. Mr. de Wulf, however, still holds the same opinion, and has defended it again in his Introduction à la Philosophie Neo scolastique."

Maurice De Wulf was a close friend of Cardinal Désiré-Joseph Mercier. The "De Wulf-Mansion Centre for Ancient and Medieval Philosophy" was founded (1956) at the Institute of Philosophy in Leuven.

De Wulf retired to Poperinghe in late 1947, and died there on 23 December.

== Bibliography ==
- 1892 - La Valeur Esthétique de la moralité dans l'Art
- 1895 - Histoire de la Philosophie Scolastique dans les Pays-Bas et la Principauté de Liège, jusqu'à la Révolution française
- 1896 - Études Historiques sur l'Esthétique de Saint Thomas d'Aquin
- 1900 - Histoire de la Philosophie Médiévale
- 1901 - Le Traité De Unitate Formae de Gilles de Lessines (texte et étude)
- 1904 - Un Théologien-Philosophe du XIIIe. Étude sur la Vie, les œuvres et l'Influence de Godefroid de Fontaines
- 1910 - Histoire de la Philosophie en Belgique
- 1915 - Guerre et Philosophie
- 1920 - L'Œuvre d'Art et la Beauté
- 1922 - Philosophy and Civilization in the Middle Ages (Princeton University Press)
- 1932 - Initiation à la Philosophie Thomiste

=== Works in English translation ===
- Scholasticism Old and New,, translated by Peter Coffey, M. H. Gill & Son, Ltd., 1907.
  - An Introduction to Scholastic Philosophy, Medieval and Modern, Dover Publications, Inc., 1956.
  - An Introduction to Scholastic Philosophy, Medieval and Modern, Editiones Scholasticae, 2012.
- Mediaeval Philosophy: Illustrated from the System of Thomas Aquinas, Harvard University Press, 1922.
  - The System of Thomas Aquinas, Dover Publications, Inc., 1959.
  - The System of Thomas Aquinas, Editiones Scholasticae, 2013.
- Philosophy and Civilization in the Middle Ages, Princeton University Press, 1922.
  - Philosophy and Civilization in the Middle Ages, Editiones Scholasticae, 2013.
- History of Mediaeval Philosophy, Longmans, Green & Co., 1909.
  - History of Mediaeval Philosophy, Dover Publications, Inc., 1952.
- Art and Beauty, Herder, 1950.

=== Articles ===
- "Western Philosophy and Theology in the Thirteenth Century," The Harvard Theological Review, Vol. XI, 1918.
- "The Teaching of Philosophy and the Classification of the Sciences in the Thirteenth Century," The Philosophical Review, Vol. 27, No. 4, Jul., 1918.
- "The Society of Nations in the Thirteenth Century," International Journal of Ethics, Vol. XXIX, 1919.
- "The Autonomy of Mediaeval Philosophy," The Harvard Theological Review, Vol. 16, No. 2, Apr., 1923.
- "Mystic Life and Mystic Speculation in the Heart of the Middle Ages," The Catholic Historical Review, Vol. 9, No. 2, Jul., 1923.

=== Other ===
- "Scholasticism." In Encyclopaedia of the Social Sciences, Vol. XIII, The Macmillan Company, 1934.

== See also ==
- Neothomism
- Scholasticism
