= Cortical cooling =

Cortical cooling refers to the cooling methods restricted to the cerebral cortex, where most higher brain processes occur. Neuroscientists generate various studies to help explain many of the complex connections and functions of the brain. Most studies utilize animal models that have varying degrees of comparison to the human brain; for example, small rodents are less comparable than non-human primates. One of the most definitive ways of determining which sections of the brain contribute to certain behavior or function is to deactivate a section of the brain and observe what behavior is altered. Lowering the temperature of the neural tissue has the effect of reducing metabolic activity in the affected region. This metabolic suppression slows down or inhibits neural firing, synaptic transmission, and other cellular processes that rely on energy. Below is a list of current cooling methods, their advantages and limitations, and some studies that have used cooling to elucidate neural functions.

== Methods of neural tissue cooling ==
There are a few options for cooling neural tissue; the chosen method depends on the experimental design including the section of the brain being cooled (the section of interest) and the volume of that section.

=== Cryoloops ===
Cryoloops are cooling devices that use 23 gauge stainless steel hypodermic tubing shaped into a loop that can fit into sulci or on the gyri of the section of interest of the cerebral cortex. A pump draws methanol from a reservoir, and the fluid flows through a dry ice bath to be cooled. The cooled methanol flows through Teflon tubing into the cryoloop’s metal tubing, which is secured by passing through a threaded post. A thermocouple connector receives the wires from a microthermocouple at the base of the loop (where the inflow and outflow tubes meet) that measures the tubing temperature. The post, the thermocouple connector, and heat-shrink Teflon tubing, which envelopes the microthermocouple wires and the inflow and outflow tubes between the post and microthermocouple, are sealed using dental acrylic.

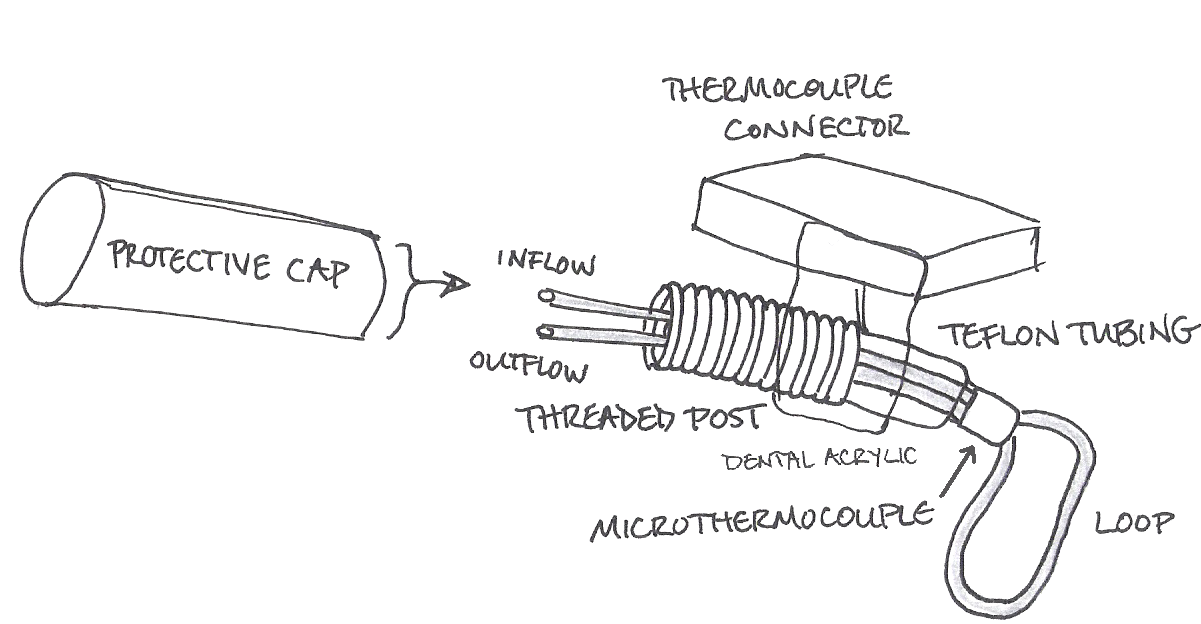
Cryoloop

After implantation, when the animal is not participating in an experiment, a protective cap is placed over the open inflow and outflow tubes. During experimentation, the inflow and outflow tubes are attached to the Teflon tubing connected to the reservoir setup. The thermocouple connector is connected to a switchbox and a thermometer so cryoloop temperature can be monitored.

Cryoloops are considered the most adaptable form of cooling available due to the customization necessary for each experiment. The investigator must form the functional cooling loop of the cryoloop to fit with whatever part of the brain he/she wishes to study, and several cryoloops can be used for one brain. Each device can cool a range of tissue areas from less than 10 mm^{3} to 75 mm^{3}. Although it may be considered a hassle to have to form each device for each section of interest, this customization allows for a more controlled region of cooling and for more efficient animal use because of the possibility for multiple cooling sites within each animal. Head restraint is unnecessary because the loops are chronically implanted and secured to the skull by screws and dental acrylic.

=== Cooling plates ===
Cooling plates are flat devices that are generally circular in shape and can cool tissue volumes of 35mm^{3} to 100mm^{3}, usually by using thermoelectric cooling. Some investigators may use a similar setup to one necessary for the cryoloop to cool the plate (flow of coolant through a dry ice bath). However, the electrical connections required for cooling are a simpler method than the setup necessary for tubes filled with coolant. To ensure the stability of the plate upon implantation, the animal must undergo fixed-head restraint, which limits the type of behavior that can be studied. Also, plates cannot conform to some areas of the cerebrum due to the disparate shapes of the plate and the brain, and they have not been successfully introduced into sulci.

=== Cryotips ===
Cryotips are made of two stainless steel hypodermic-needle tubes, such as 18 gauge tube surrounding a 24 gauge tube, soldered together. Like the cryoloop, cooled methanol flows through the inner tube to cool the device. If the investigator chooses to insulate the shaft of the tube, a low-resistance heater-wire can be wrapped around the outer tube except for 2 mm at the tip; passing a direct current through the wire keeps the shaft at normal brain temperature. This ensures localized cooling at the tip, which is inserted into the brain to reach deeper structures, without cooling the overlying structures. More than one microthermocouple is required to measure shaft and tip temperatures. Modified versions of this device use smaller gauge tubing (21 and 30 gauge), and additional tubing is attached to form a y-shaped fork with HFC-134a cooling agent flowing through the double tubing while the fork is under vacuum. The vacuum causes the coolant to flow from the inner tubing into the outer tubing (so the coolant is in between the inner and outer tubes as well as inside the inner tube). Cryotips are usually used to cool deeper structures of the brain that cannot be thermodynamically cooled from the surface. They are not used much in cortical cooling due to the small volumes that are cooled – investigators cooling cortical tissue are usually interested in larger sections than this device can cool. Cryotips cool tissue volumes of 2 mm^{3} to 5 mm^{3}. Usually the shaft of the device is insulated or even heated for localized cooling, however, some studies have used uninsulated cryotips to cool surface structures in addition to the deeper sections.

=== Other ===
Epileptic patients can undergo surgical resection to reduce the occurrence of seizures, and cortical stimulation mapping identifies functional neural tissue to preserve it. However, up to 5% of these patients will suffer from an intraoperative seizures during mapping. Recently, cooled saline was used during surgical resection in some of these patients and was found to reduce intraoperative epileptiform discharges (electroencephalogram spike frequency decreased), suggesting the potential of intraoperative seizure can be decreased by cooling the tissue.

== Advantages and limitations ==
A common method of deactivation when studying brain function is ablation of neural tissue, but there are several drawbacks. The exact location and extent of ablation, whether caused by chemicals or lesions, can only be defined post mortem. If the ablation occurred in an undesired location or has deactivated more of the tissue than intended, the time and resources were already been spent while obtaining results unrelated to the designed investigation. Also, ablation permanently deactivates the section of interest due to damage or removal of the neural tissue. Since the tissue cannot be reactivated, control measures that can be directly compared to the deactivation-induced effects cannot be obtained. Comparisons must be made between animals, which will have inherent differences, so internal double dissociations are not possible. Another major drawback in using ablation to deactivate tissue is that because the brain is plastic, while animals are recovering from ablation surgery, the cerebral cortex is able to modify the neural networking by activating new connections or strengthening pre-existing ones. This could cause the resulting behavior in the investigation to appear normal even though part of the animal’s brain has been deactivated, and then investigators would not be able to tell the contribution of the deactivated section to normal function. To overcome many of these drawbacks, cortical cooling devices may be used instead of ablation.
While allowing a range of tissue areas to be cooled (small with cryotips to very large if using multiple cryoloops or a cooling plate), using cooling devices is a reversible method that enables control of the period of inactivation and, when turned off, takes only minutes for the animal to recover full function. These advantages hold even when deactivations are repeated over long periods of time, from months to years, with no evidence of attenuation.

=== Absence of neural compensation ===
Cortical cooling devices do not cause any damage to the neural tissue when they are implanted or used repeatedly to cool the section of interest. This allows reversal of the deactivation and eliminates the concern of neural compensation. Cooling can be quickly initialized and terminated with the currently available devices, so the neural tissue has no time to create or strengthen neural networks. This ensures the deactivation induces an effect in neural function, and the behavior being studied is produced from the deactivated tissue and not from modified networks.

=== Efficient animal use ===
Reversibility of the deactivation enables animals to be used as their own controls, which removes variation between animals designated as “control” and animals in the experimental group and allows for internal double dissociations. Large amounts of data can be gathered for each animal since it can undergo several trials in one experiment or, in the case of the chronically implanted cryoloops and cryotips, be used in more than one experiment. These advantages allow for fewer animals needed for each experiment while obtaining reliable results.

=== Control of deactivated tissue parameters ===
Based on thermodynamic principles, thermoclines can be determined to establish the spread of cooling from particular cooling surfaces. Therefore, for each cooling device with a known and consistent surface area, the temperature can be set at the same value for each trial or experiment to generate the same thermoclines and replicate the same volume of deactivation. Therefore, specifically selected regions of tissue can be reversibly deactivated in a controlled and reproducible way. 20°C has been found to be the critical temperature for active neuronal signals; below this temperature, afferent signals cannot activate neurons and the tissue is considered deactivated. As long as the desired tissue reaches below the critical temperature while the surrounding tissue remains above it, the thermoclines generated by the device can be pre-calculated so that the temperature can be set to only deactivate the tissue of interest.
Cooling can also be initiated and terminated with the same time required to reach either deactivation temperature or normal physiological temperature each time. This enables control over the onset of deactivation, its duration, and recovery for each experiment.

=== Experimental limitations due to physical setup ===
Because the devices require an external mechanism to be cooled, the animals will be restrained to some extent. With cooling plates, fixed-head restraint is necessary to ensure the plate remains over the desired section of tissue, and plates require an electrical connection to be cooled. With cryoloops and cryotips, the animals do not require fixed-head restraint because the devices are chronically implanted, but they have a limited space in which they can move due to the distance allowed by the tubes supplying the cooled methanol. The tubes are usually 1 meter in length to ensure the methanol is at the desired cool temperature by the time it reaches the functional cooling surface; otherwise, the tubing should be insulated. These restrictions limit some of the behaviors that can be studied compared to those possible when no external setup is required.

=== Studying damaged tissue ===
Using cooling methods to deactivate tissue is not always the best choice. If a study aims to determine the effects of damage on behavior or function, likely a reversible method that does not damage tissue to disrupt neural activity is not the best model to use. In studying damaged tissue, using ablation would probably generate the most similar behavioral and functional deficits.

== Uses in neuroscience ==
These cooling methods have been used to deactivate neural tissues in several studies, and investigators have elucidated contributions of several brain regions to normal function and behavior.

=== Traumatic brain injury ===
In non-human primates, it was found that cooling the cortex after traumatic brain injury had occurred could reduce necrosis volume by 50% up to 10 days post-injury and edema volume by 50% up to 40 hours post-injury. Therefore, cooling helps preserve the tissue after injury.

=== Auditory cortex studies ===
To determine what parts of the auditory cortex contribute to sound localization, investigators implanted cryoloops to deactivate the 13 known regions of acoustically responsive cortex of the cat.

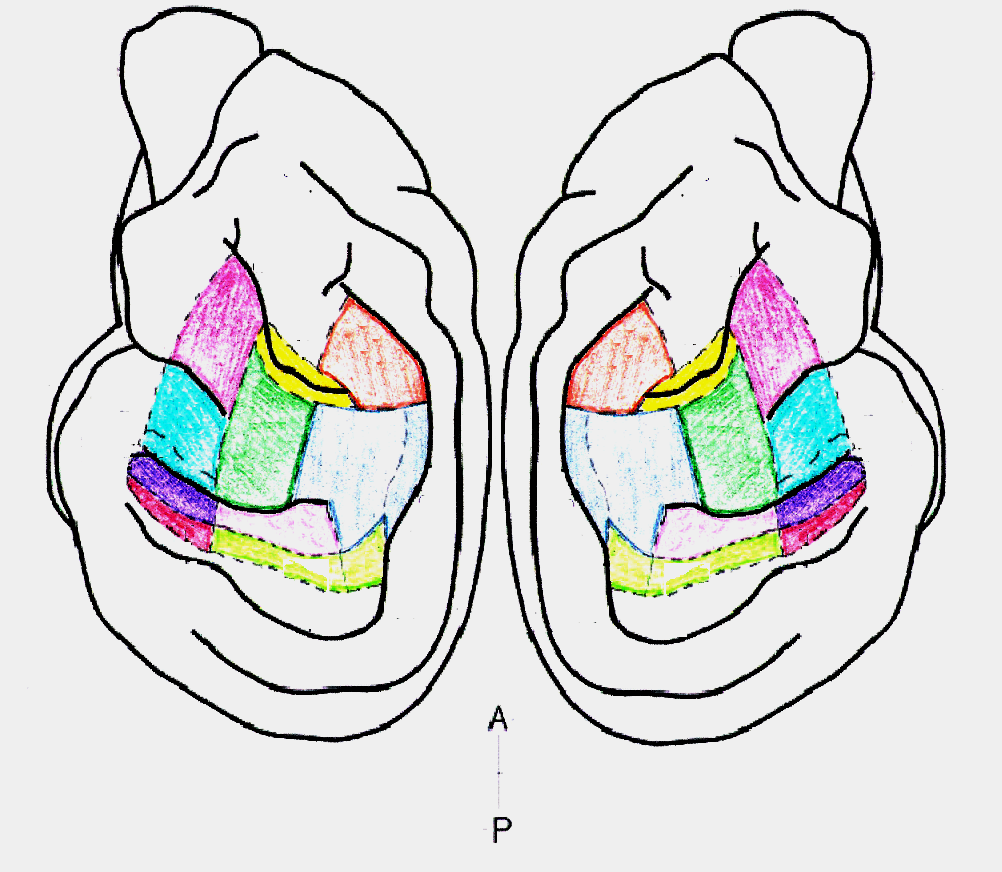
Auditory cortex of a cat brain. The colored sections are those implanted with cryoloops (10 total), which encompass the 13 acoustically responsive sections of the cat auditory cortex. A – anterior, P – posterior.

Cats learned to make an orienting response by moving their heads and approaching a 100-ms broad-band noise stimulus emitted from a central speaker or one of 12 peripheral speakers located at 15° intervals from left 90° to right 90°along the horizontal plane after attending to a central visual stimulus generated by a red LED. After the cats had reached at least 80% accuracy in identifying the location of the sound stimulus, each was implanted with one or two bilateral pairs of cryoloops over the different sections of the auditory cortex; 10 sections were defined. Cryoloops were turned on so that the loops reached a temperature of 3°C (plus or minus 1°C), first unilaterally, then bilaterally, next unilaterally on the other side, and finally baseline task performance was recorded after recovering from cooling. This cycle was repeated several times for each cat.

Of the 10 sections that were deactivated, only deactivation of 3 sections, the AI (primary auditory cortex)/DZ (dorsal zone), PAF (posterior auditory field), and AES (anterior ectosylvian sulcus) sections, were found to have an effect on sound localization. At baseline, cats were able to locate 90% of the sound stimuli. Unilateral deactivation of any one of these sections resulted in a contralateral impairment in sound localization, or 10% accuracy. Bilateral deactivation of any combination of these three sections resulted in a 180° deficit to 10% of sound locations identified, although this accuracy implied that cats were still able to orient to the hemifield where the sound occurred above chance (7.7%). Since the primary auditory cortex and dorsal zone were concurrently cooled, the investigators performed another study in which the AI and DZ were examined as separate entities to further establish the sections of auditory cortex contributing to sound localization. The experimental design was the same as the above-mentioned design with the exception that only the AI and DZ sections were implanted with separate cryoloops. Again, it was found that unilateral simultaneous cooling deactivation of the AI and DZ generated contralateral sound localization deficits while bilateral deactivation created a deficit in both hemifields (10% sound location identification). Bilateral deactivation of AI alone resulted in only 45% accuracy within 30° of the target. Bilateral deactivation of DZ resulted in 60% accuracy but with larger errors, often into the hemifield opposite the target. Therefore, AZ deactivation produces a higher number of small errors while deactivation of DZ leads to larger but fewer errors. This finding that AI and DZ deactivation produce partial deficits in sound localization implies that the previous finding that PAF and AES deactivation have more considerable contributions to sound localization than either the AI or DZ.

=== Visual cortex studies ===
In cats, the ability to disengage visual attention and redirect it to a new location is normally localizable to posterior middle suprasylvian (pMS) cortex, and investigators wanted to determine if, when primary visual cortical areas 17 and 18 are removed at birth, the neural functions of these areas are redistributed across other sections of the visual cortex, such as the pMS. This neural compensation would spare the function of areas 17 and 18 but at a possible cost of reducing the functional capabilities of the compensating cortex. After birth, areas 17 and 18 were lesioned in four cats, and they were then trained on behavioral tasks requiring detection and orienting to a visual or sound (as a negative control) stimulus. Then bilaterial cryoloops were implanted over the pMS and ventral posterior suprasylvian (vPS) cortices. The vPS lies adjacent to the pMS, and these areas were previously surmised to receive networks from other visual areas. Investigators found that, for moving visual stimuli, unilateral deactivation of pMS cortex partially impaired task performance when visual stimuli were moved into the hemifield opposite the side of the brain being cooled. Additionally deactivating the ipsilateral vPS cortex produced more complete task impairment. Bilateral deactivation of the pMS cortex, either alone or in combination with bilateral vPS deactivation, largely reversed the unilaterally cooling-induced impairments. For static visual stimuli, unilateral deactivation of pMS fully impaired task performance in the contralateral hemifield, while bilateral deactivation created full neglect of stimuli across the entire field of vision. For the vPS, unilateral deactivation had no effect on task performance, while bilateral deactivation generated inconsistencies in performance. All impairments were completely reversed when cooling was terminated. This study showed that the plasticity of neural tissue enabled functions from removed brain sections to redistribute to functionally distinct sections of cortex. Reversible cooling was performed on slices of rat visual cortex, and spike characteristics were observed. Cooling depolarized the neural tissue, bringing the cells closer to the threshold necessary for an action potential (spike). Cooling increased spike width, and between 12 and 20°C, spike amplitudes were greatest. Cooling decreased passive potassium conductance while increasing the activation threshold and lowering the amplitude of voltage-gated potassium channels (thus essentially reducing the cells’ capability to repolarize after an action potential). No sodium channel characteristics were altered. Hence, basic membrane properties were changed due to the modified conductance ratio of potassium and sodium, and this change was temperature dependent.

=== Somatosensory cortex studies ===
Part of the somatosensory cortex of rats is arranged in distinct sections called barrels that account for stimuli sensed by each whisker. Cooling the somatosensory cortex surface helps to dissociate the activity generated in different barrels, thus bringing to light some of the dynamics involved in cortical processing of sensory inputs.

=== Other ===
Cryotips were used in male rats to cool the caudate putamen (CP) to study consumption behaviors. The shaft of the cryotips were not insulated, so overlying tissue including meninges and cortex overlying the CP were also cooled. All three regions were subsequently cooled in combinations and separately to determine which areas contribute to consumption reduction. Cooling the cortex alone created a conditioned consumption reduction; consumption reduction was contingent on pairing a sucrose solution (to be consumed) with cortical cooling.

== See also ==
- Ablation
