= Clara Clairbert =

Belgian soprano

- Born: Clara Pierre Impens; 21 February 1896; Brussels, Belgium
- Died: August 16, 1970 (aged 74); Brussels, Belgium
- Other names: Clary Annie, Clara Pierre Impens
- Occupation: Singer
- Known for: Les Contes d'Hoffmann

Clara Pierre Impens (21 February 1896 – 16 August 1970) was a Belgian soprano who sang under the stage-name Clara Clairbert. A celebrated coloratura soprano, she had an international opera career from 1924 until her retirement in 1953. She was most active at La Monnaie where she performed throughout her career. She also performed in operas and concerts as a guest in European and American theatres. In her later life she worked as a voice teacher in Brussels.

== Early life ==
Clara Clairbert was born with the name Clara Pierre Impens on 21 February 1896 in Saint-Gilles, Brussels, Belgium. She began studying music in Anderlecht at the age of seven. During the First World War her father, a civil servant, followed the Belgian government into exile, settling his family in Le Havre. There, Clara sang in a Belgian choir, coming to the attention of choir-master Philippe Mousset who arranged for Clara to be trained as a soloist in Paris under Mme Monel.

Clairbert worked as a secretary for the Belgian War Ministry in Le Havre during World War I. After the war, she appeared regularly at benefit concerts for Belgian veterans and war wounded throughout Belgium. She continued her vocal training in Brussels, and under the name Clary Annie sang Marie in La fille du régiment in an amateur production which brought her to the attention of Maurice Corneil de Thoran, the director of La Monnaie, who offered her a contract.

== Performance career ==
Taking the stage name Clara Clairbert, she first sang at La Monnaie as Olympia in Offenbach's The Tales of Hoffmann in 1924. She was a resident prima donna at La Monnaie from 1924-1928, and again from 1939 to 1952; however in the intermittent years when she was not a resident artist with company she was still active there as a regular guest performer. At La Monnaie Violetta in La traviata was her most frequently performed role; a part which she sang 225 times at the theatre between 1925 and 1950.

Some of the other parts she performed in Belgium included Amina in La sonnambula, Countess Almaviva in The Marriage of Figaro, Donna Elvira in Don Giovanni, Fiordiligi in Così fan tutte, Juliette in Roméo et Juliette, Leïla in Les pêcheurs de perles, Micaëla in Carmen, Musetta in La bohème, the Nightingale in L'enfant et les sortilèges, Ophélie in Hamlet, Philine in Mignon, the Queen of the Night in The Magic Flute, Sophie in Der Rosenkavalier, Tsaritsa of Shemakh in The Golden Cockerel, and the title roles in Esclarmonde, Lakmé, Manon, and Mireille.

In the autumn of 1930 Clairbert made her United States debut as Violetta at the San Francisco Opera (SFO); a role she repeated with that same year with the Los Angeles Grand Opera at the Shrine Auditorium. Her San Francisco and Los Angeles engagements were both conducted by Gaetano Merola and co-starred John Charles Thomas as Germont and Beniamino Gigli as Alfredo. She also made a guest appearance with the Chicago Civic Opera and performed in Philadelphia, and gave further performances with the SFO in the title role of Lucia di Lammermoor and as Philine in Mignon. She appeared at the Opéra de Monte-Carlo as Massenet's Manon in 1931 and as Bizet's Leila in 1933.

Clairbert gave a successful first performance in Paris as Gilda in Rigoletto at the Palais Garnier 1933. She also gave tours of Romania, Denmark, Switzerland, and France. She was also active as a concert singer. In assessing her career Karl-Josef Kutsch and Leo Riemens stated she was "one of the most important coloratura sopranos of the French speaking world within her generation; her voice had impressively technical brilliance and superior musicality".

== Later life and death ==
After retiring from the stage in 1953, Clairbert had a second career as a voice teacher in Brussels where operated a private studio. She died in Brussels on 16 August 1970.
