= Abraham Mayer =

Abraham Mayer (10 July 1816 – 1 March 1899) was a German-born Belgian physician.

== Life ==
Mayer was born in Düsseldorf, Kingdom of Prussia. After studying medicine at Bonn (MD, 1839) he settled in Antwerp in 1848, where he practised as a physician until his death. He took an active part in public life and in the medical activities of his adopted country. For some years he was assistant surgeon in the Belgian regiment of the Hussars of the Guard; and he became a member of the board of medical inspectors to the schools at Antwerp, and president and vice-president of various medical societies in Belgium.

== Works ==
Mayer contributed many essays to the medical journals of Belgium, including the following: "Un cas de mort par suite de brûlure (perforation duodénale)", 1866; "Un cas d'eclampsie puerpérale au commencement du neuvième mois de la grossesse : enfant né vivant à terme", 1868; "Quelques observations sur les hôpitaux de Londres", 1869; "Une cause insolite de l'intoxication saturne : par le tabac à priser", 1870; "Deux cas d'intoxication puerpérale", 1878; "Une note sur le traitement du choléra", 1885. Most of these were published in the proceedings of the Société de médecine and the Société médico-chirurgicale, both of Antwerp.

== Bibliography ==
- Jew. Chron. March 10, 1899;
- Annales de la Société médico-chirurgicale d'Anvers, pp. 89 et seq., Antwerp, Feb., 1899.
