= 1909 in Belgium =

- Decades: 1880s; 1890s; 1900s; 1910s; 1920s
- See also: Other events of 1909; List of years in Belgium

The following lists events that happened during 1909 in the Kingdom of Belgium.

== Incumbents ==
- Monarch: Leopold II (until 17 December), Albert I (from in 23 December)
- Prime Minister: Frans Schollaert

== Events ==
- disbanding of the Athletic and Running Club de Bruxelles
- disbanding of the Olympia Club de Bruxelles
- December 23 – Albert I sworn in as King, following the death of his uncle King Leopold II, on December 17

== Publications ==
- Hippolyte Fierens-Gevaert, Les Primitifs Flamands, volume 1 (Brussels, G. Van Oest)
- Godefroid Kurth, La Cité de Liège au Moyen̂-Age, vol. 1 (Brussels, A. Dewit)
- C. Liebrechts, Congo: Léopoldville, Bolobo, Équateur, 1883-1889 (Brussels)
- Joseph Van den Gheyn, Catalogue des manuscrits de la Bibliothèque royale de Belgique, vol. 9.

== Art and architecture ==
Buildings

- Henri Van Dievoet, Hotel Astoria, Brussels

== Births ==
- 19 March – Jean Brachet, chemist (died 1988)
- 30 August – Edgard Darimont, poster artist (died 1980)

== Deaths ==
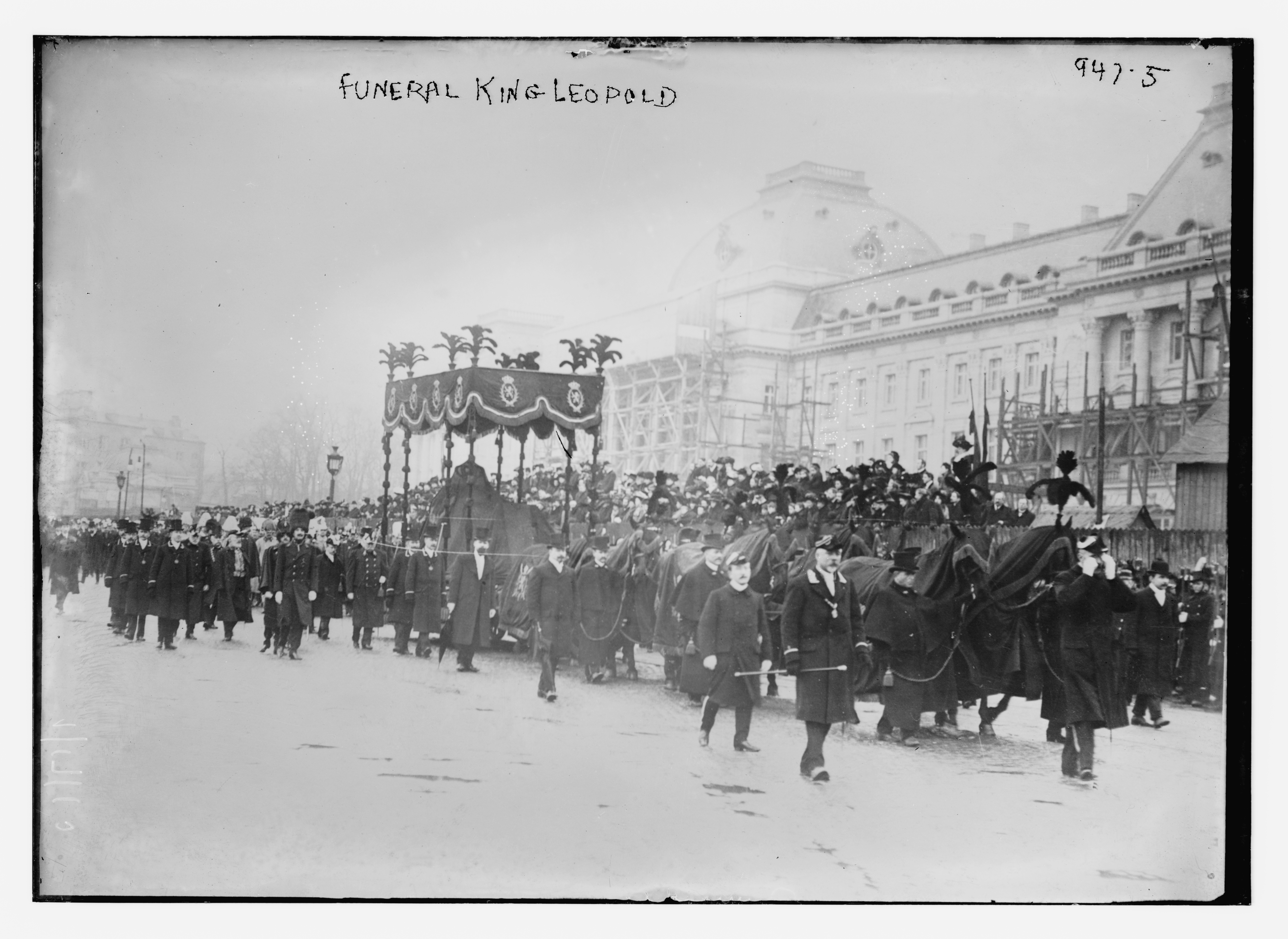
Funeral cortege for King Leopold II

- 4 February – Léon Roget (born 1858), colonial officer
- 2 September – Louis Delacenserie (born 1838), architect
- 3 September – Jean Stecher (born 1820), literary historian
- 11 December – Jenny Minne-Dansaert (born 1844), lacemaker
- 17 December – King Leopold II
