= 1904 in Belgium =

- Decades: 1880s; 1890s; 1900s; 1910s; 1920s
- See also: Other events of 1904; List of years in Belgium

The following lists events that happened during 1904 in the Kingdom of Belgium.

== Incumbents ==
- Monarch: Leopold II
- Prime Minister: Paul de Smet de Naeyer

== Events ==
- Institut de Droit International awarded the Nobel Peace Prize

April

- 17 April – Edmond de Gaiffier d'Hestroy replaces Maurice Joostens as Belgian ambassador to China

May

- 1 May – Belgium national football team plays its first international, against France
- 21 May – Belgium national football association a founder member of FIFA
- 29 May – 1904 Belgian general election

June

- 5 June – Provincial elections

October

- 29 October – Extradition treaty with Cuba concluded.

== Art and architecture ==
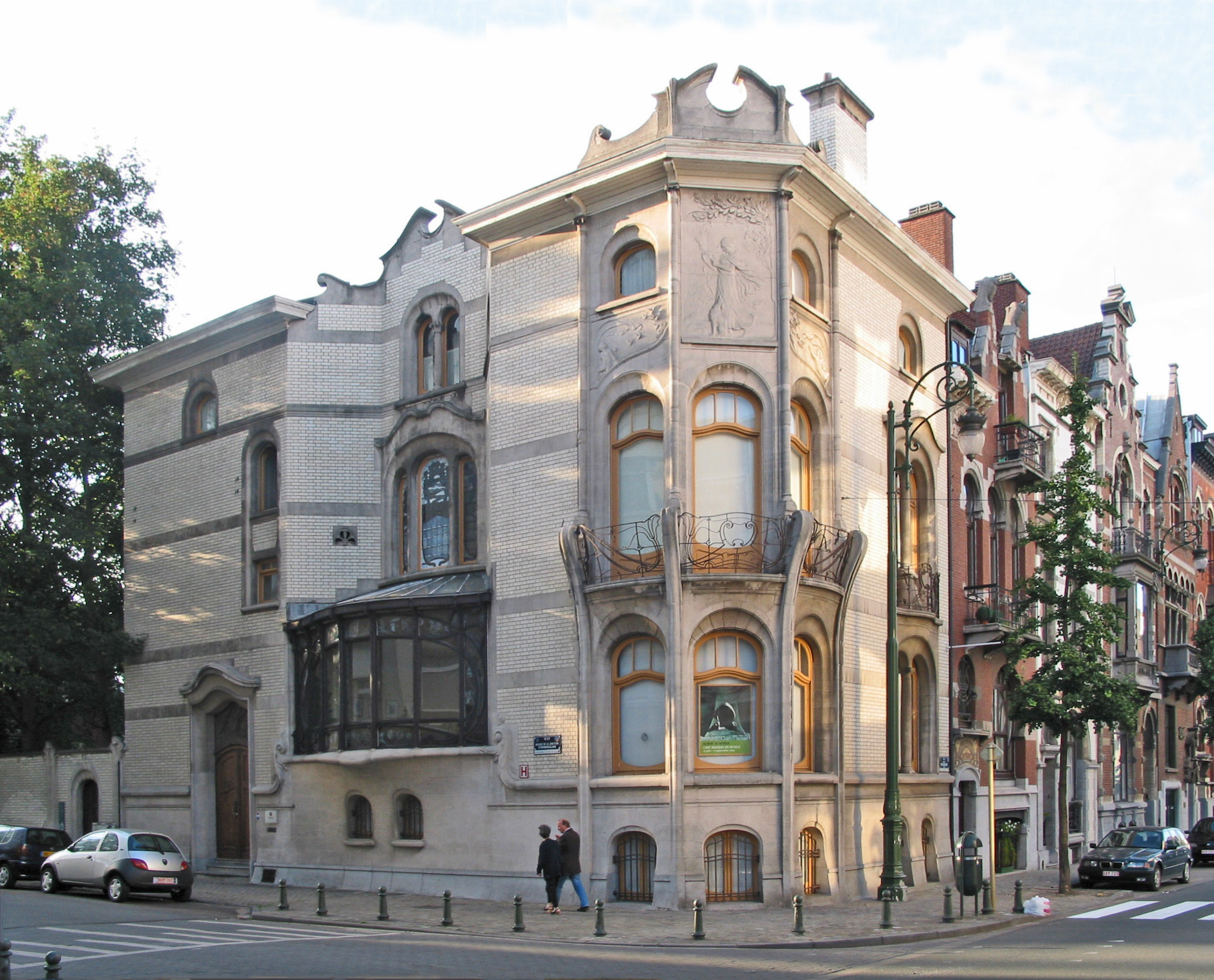
Hôtel Hannon in Saint-Gilles, completed 1904

Alfred Verhaeren, Interior of a Sacristy (1904)

Buildings

- Hôtel Hannon, an Art Nouveau villa in Saint-Gilles, designed by Jules Brunfaut for Édouard Hannon

Paintings

- Alfred Verhaeren, Interior of a Sacristy

== Publications ==
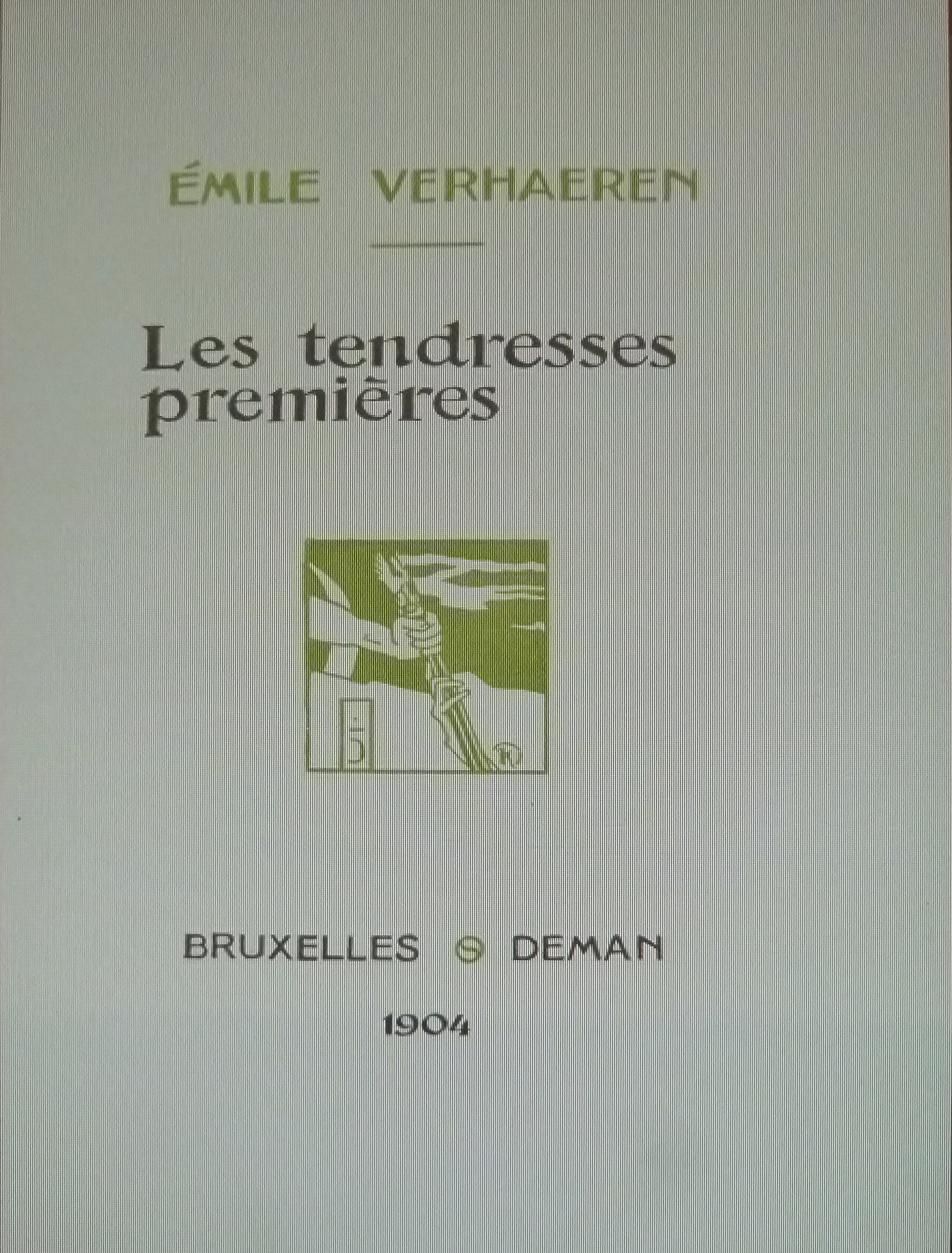
Émile Verhaeren, Les tendresses premières, illustrated by Théo van Rysselberghe (Brussels, Edmond Deman, 1904)

Periodicals

- Annuaire de l'Institut de droit international begins publication
- Bulletin des Sociétés Chimiques Belges begins publication
- Het Missiewerk begins publication

Reports and studies

- Casement Report
- E. D. Morel, King Leopold's Rule in Africa

Scholarship

- Jean Capart, Les débuts de l'art en Égypte (Brussels, Vromany)
- G. Des Marez, L'organisation du travail a Bruxelles au XVe siècle (Brussels)
- Maurice De Wulf, Introduction à la philosophie néoscolastique.
- Joseph Van den Gheyn, Catalogue des manuscrits de la Bibliothèque royale de Belgique, vol. 4.

Guides

- First Michelin Guide for Belgium published
- Touring Club Belgium publishes road map of Belgium

Literary writing

- Henry Carton de Wiart, La cité ardente
- Émile Verhaeren, Les tendresses premières, illustrated by Théo van Rysselberghe (Brussels, Edmond Deman)

== Births ==
- Louis Pevernagie, painter (died 1970)
- 6 January – Aimée Bologne-Lemaire, activist (died 1998)
- 25 January – Albert De Roocker, Olympic fencer
- 9 February – Karel Bossart, engineer (died 1975)
- 10 February – Henri Hébrans, boxer
- 13 February – Lucien Debleyser, boxer
- 21 February – Armand Preud'homme, composer (died 1986)
- 2 March – Jan Mertens, cyclist (died 1964)
- 30 March
  - Marguerite Acarin, dance artist (died 1999)
  - Edgar P. Jacobs, comic book creator (died 1987)
- 8 April – Piet Vermeylen, politician (died 1991)
- 15 April – René Lagrou, Nazi collaborator (died 1969)
- 9 May – Pol Demeuter, motorcycle racer (died 1934)
- 12 May – Adolphe Groscol, Olympic athlete (died 1985)
- 17 May – Fernand Dineur, cartoonist (died 1956)
- 30 June – Edith Kiel, film maker (died 1993)
- 8 July – Roger Motz, politician (died 1964)
- 10 July – Jules Herremans, Olympic athlete (died 1974)
- 16 July – Leo Joseph Suenens, Archbishop of Mechelen-Brussel (died 1996)
- 27 July – Omer Taverne, cyclist (died 1981)
- 17 August – Raymond Jeener, biologist (died 1995)
- 18 September – Paul Van den Broeck, sportsman
- 6 October – Victor Larock, politician (died 1977)
- 23 October – Maximilien de Furstenberg, prelate (died 1988)
- 19 November – Louise Janson-Scheidt, writer (died 1997)
- 12 December – Jacques Van Melkebeke, artist and writer (died 1983)

== Deaths ==
- Robert Vinçotte (born 1844), engineer
- 15 January – Eduard Lassen (born 1830), composer
- 23 January – Gédéon Bordiau (born 1832), architect
- 26 March – Ferdinand Pauwels (born 1830), painter
- 21 April – Piatus of Mons (born 1815), theologian
- 10 May – Henry Morton Stanley (born 1841), explorer of Congo
- 9 June – Hendrik Frans Schaefels (born 1827), painter
- 12 June – Camille of Renesse-Breidbach (born 1836), entrepreneur
- 15 August – Frans de Potter (born 1834), writer
- 19 November – August Snieders (born 1825), journalist
- 13 December – Henri Van Cutsem (born 1839), patron of the arts
- 24 December – Julien Dillens (born 1849), sculptor
