= 1906 in Belgium =

- Decades: 1880s; 1890s; 1900s; 1910s; 1920s
- See also: Other events of 1906; List of years in Belgium

The following lists events that happened during 1906 in the Kingdom of Belgium.

== Incumbents ==
- Monarch: Leopold II
- Prime Minister: Paul de Smet de Naeyer

== Events ==
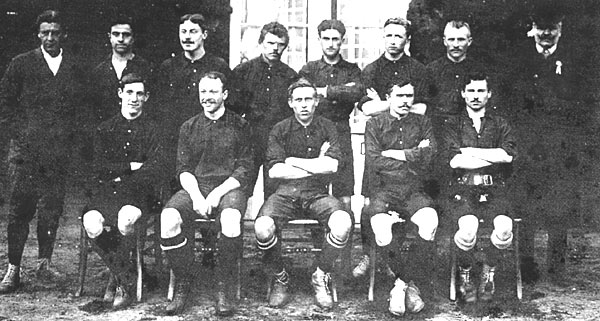
Belgium national football team before an international match on 29 April 1906

- 7 February – Murder of Jeanne Van Calck in Brussels.
- 24 February – Chilean diplomat Ernesto Balmaceda Bello murdered in Brussels.
- 10 April – Chief of the General Staff reports to Minister of War on confidential conversations held earlier in the year with the British military attaché regarding the landing of a British expeditionary force in the event of a German invasion.
- Belgian Olympic Committee founded, with Édouard de Laveleye as first president.
- 22 April to 2 May – 16 Belgian athletes participate in the Intercalated Games in Athens, winning 6 medals.
- 29 April – Belgium national football team play against Netherlands national football team at Antwerp, winning 5–0. Robert De Veen scored a hat-trick in the second half.
- 27 May – Partial legislative election
- 6 July – Belgium a signatory to the Geneva Convention of 1906.
- 15 to 19 August – Seventeenth International Eucharistic Congress held in Tournai.
- 28 October – Union Minière du Haut Katanga incorporated

== Publications ==
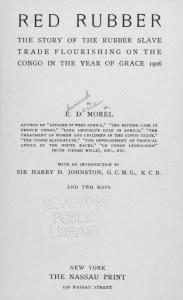
E. D. Morel, Red Rubber (1906), title page

Periodicals

- La Belgique Artistique et Littéraire, vols. 2 (January–March), 3 (April–June), 4 (July–September), 5 (October–December).

Books

- Félicien Cattier, Étude sur la situation de l'État indépendant du Congo
- Ernest Gilliat-Smith, The Story of Brussels, illustrated by Katharine Kimball and Guy Gilliat-Smith (Medieval Towns Series; London, J.M. Dent)
- Karl Hanquet (ed.), La Chronique de Saint-Hubert dite Cantatorium (Brussels, Hayez, Imprimeur de L'Academie)
- E. D. Morel, Red Rubber (New York)
- Max Rooses, Jordaens' leven en werken
- Joseph Van den Gheyn, Catalogue des manuscrits de la Bibliothèque royale de Belgique . Tome sixième: Histoire des ordres religieux et des églises particulières (Brussels, Henri Lamertin), vol. 6 of the catalogue of manuscripts of the Royal Library of Belgium.
- Emile Vandervelde, Le Socialisme et l'agriculture (1906)
- Émile Verhaeren, Les heures d'après-midi (Brussels, Edmond Deman)

== Art and architecture ==
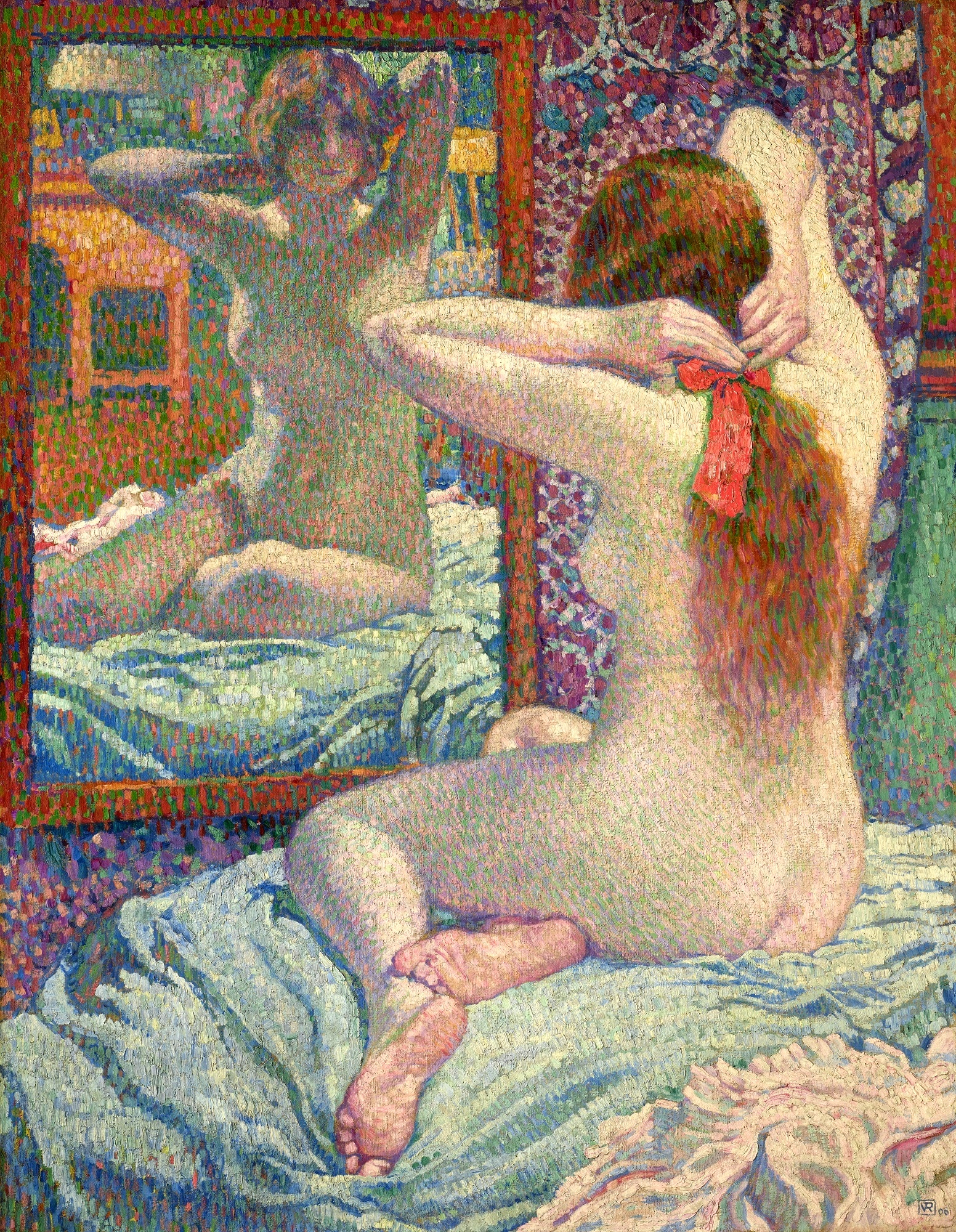
Théo van Rysselberghe, The Scarlet Ribbon (1906)

- 12th Brussels Salon of the Société Royale des Beaux-arts

Paintings

- Théo van Rysselberghe, The Scarlet Ribbon

Buildings

- Royal Galleries of Ostend completed

== Births ==
- 5 January – Mark Severin, graphic designer (died 1987)
- 25 January – Eddy Blondeel, SAS commander (died 2000)
- 14 February – Felix Meskens, athlete (died 1973)
- 18 February – Placide Tempels, missionary (died 1977)
- 22 March – Marcel Hastir, artist (died 2011)
- 29 May – Max Cosyns, explorer (died 1998)
- 8 June – Charles Janssens, actor (died 1986)
- 15 June – Léon Degrelle, fascist (died 1994)
- 3 July – Fernand Dehousse, politician (died 1976)
- 29 July – Alice Roberts, actress (died 1985)
- 4 August – Marie José of Belgium, Queen of Italy (died 2001)
- 5 August – Francis Walder, writer and soldier (died 1997)
- 8 August – André Demedts, educator (died 1992)
- 15 September – Charles of Limburg Stirum, courtier (died 1989)
- 16 September – Joseph Donceel, Jesuit (died 1994)
- 25 September – Madeleine Bourdouxhe, author (died 1996)
- 22 November – Rita Lejeune, medievalist (died 2009)

== Deaths ==
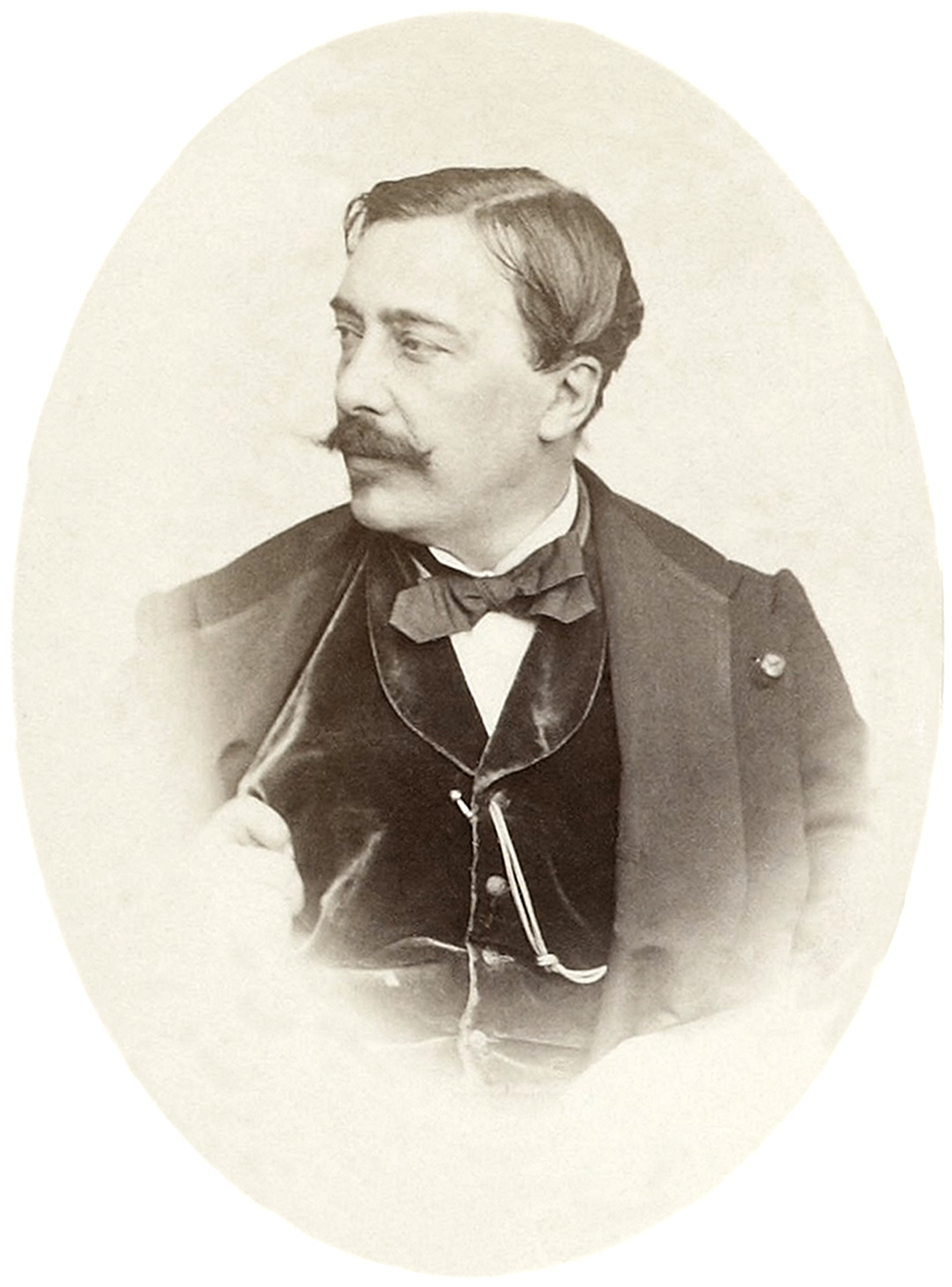
A photograph of Alfred Stevens (1823–1906) by Erwin Hanfstaengl, from Édouard Manet's personal album

- 25 January – Pierre-Lambert Goossens (born 1827), Archbishop of Mechelen
- 25 February – Jean Baptiste Abbeloos (born 1836), orientalist
- April – Victor Warot (born 1834), opera singer
- May – Jan-Baptist Huysmans (born 1826), painter
- 24 April – Georges Montefiore-Levi (born 1832), industrialist
- 24 August – Alfred Stevens (born 1823), painter
- 23 September – Jan Van Rijswijck (born 1853), politician
- 26 September – Paul Splingaerd (born 1842), mandarin
- 27 September – Felix Leopold Oswald (born 1845), science populariser
- 9 November – Léon Vanderkindere (born 1842), historian
- 30 December – Eugène Goossens, père (born 1845), conductor
- 31 December – Hippolyte Lippens (born 1847), industrialist
