= 1907 in Belgium =

- Decades: 1880s; 1890s; 1900s; 1910s; 1920s
- See also: Other events of 1907; List of years in Belgium

The following lists events that happened during 1907 in the Kingdom of Belgium.

== Incumbents ==
- Monarch: Leopold II
- Prime Minister: Paul de Smet de Naeyer (to 2 May); Jules de Trooz (2 May–31 December); Frans Schollaert (from 31 December)

== Events ==
- Royal Belgian Hockey Association founded.
- 24 March – Football season 1906-1907 ends with Royale Union Saint-Gilloise at the top of the Belgian First Division.
- 14 April – Belgium national football team plays Netherlands national football team in Antwerp.
- 21 April – Belgium national football team plays France national football team in Brussels.
- 9 May – Belgium national football team plays Netherlands national football team in Haarlem.
- 16 May-14 June – Ostend 1907 chess tournament.
- 8 July – Scheldeprijs cycling race first organised by the Antwerp branch of the Belgian cycling federation
- 23 July – Port of Zeebrugge formally opened.
- 16 October – Copyright convention with Germany agreed in Brussels; ratified May 1908.
- 18 October – Belgium a signatory to the Hague Convention of 1907
- 26 October – Ratification of the German-Belgian railway convention of 1903.

== Publications ==
Periodicals

- La Belgique Artistique et Littéraire, vols. 6 (January–March), 7 (April–June), 8 (July–September), 9 (October–December).

Books

- Jules Barbey d'Aurevilly, Le rideau cramoisi, illustrated by Armand Rassenfosse (Brussels, Edmond Deman)
- Félix Magnette, Les émigrés français aux Pays-Bas, 1789-1794 (Brussels, Hayez)
- Henri Pirenne, Histoire de Belgique, vol. 3 (Brussels, Henri Lamertin)
- Stijn Streuvels, De vlaschaard
- Joseph Van den Gheyn, Catalogue des manuscrits de la Bibliothèque royale de Belgique, vol. 7.

== Art and architecture ==
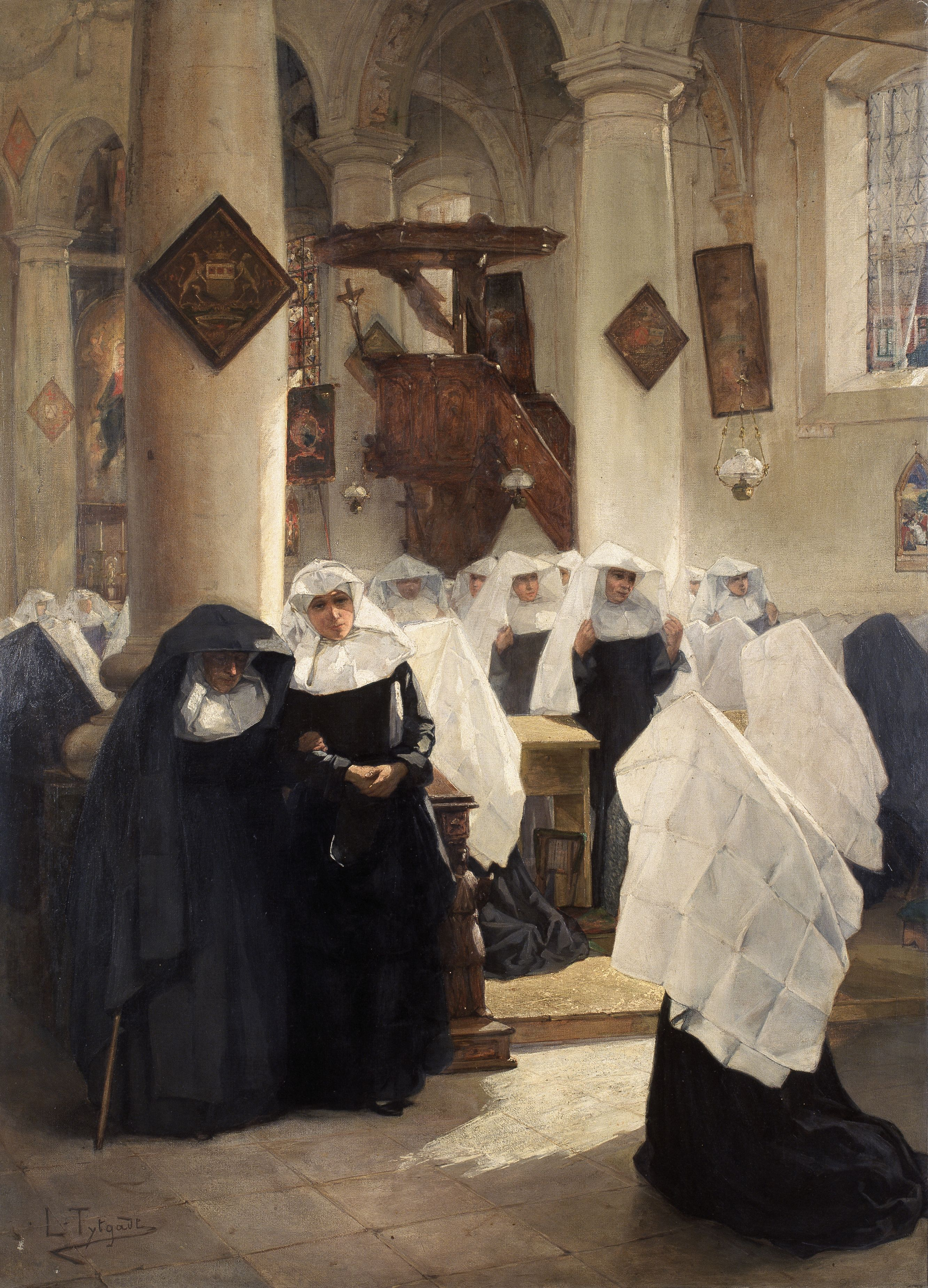
Louis Tytgadt, After Mass in the Beguinage

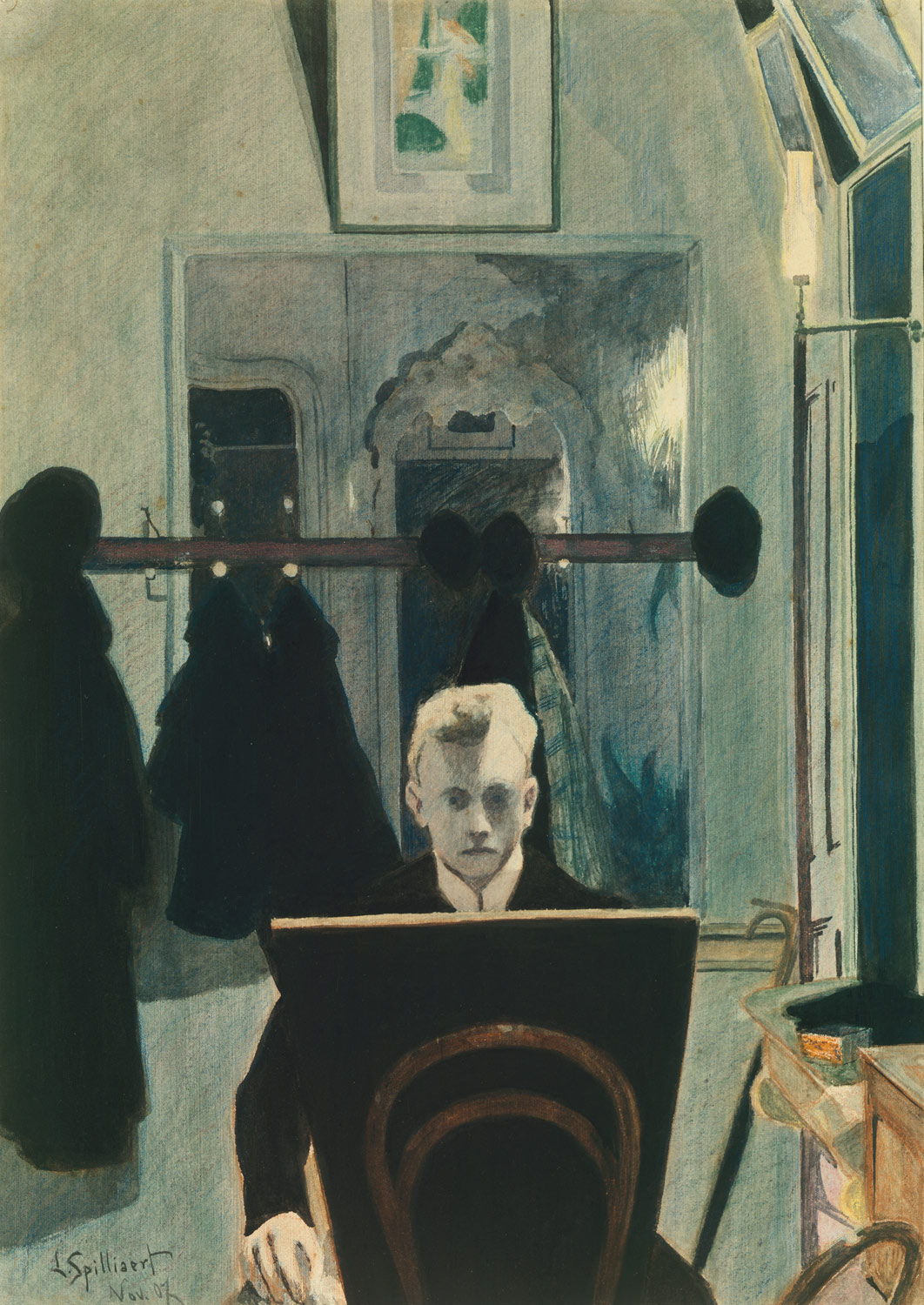
Léon Spilliaert, Self-Portrait

- Henry De Groux, Portrait of James Ensor
- Léon Spilliaert, Self-Portrait
- Louis Tytgadt, After Mass in the Church of the Onze-Lieve-Vrouw Ter Hoye Beguinage in Ghent

== Births ==
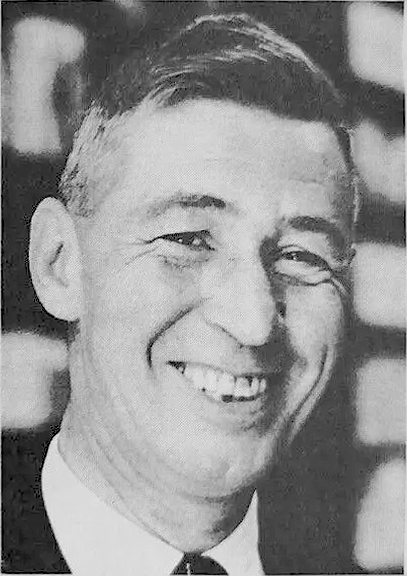
Hergé

- 3 February – Charles Verlinden, historian (died 1996)
- 17 March – Jean Van Houtte, prime minister (died 1991)
- 19 March – Charles-Emmanuel Janssen, politician (died 1985)
- 28 April – Raymond Braine, footballer (died 1978)
- 22 May – Hergé, comics author (died 1983)
- 24 May – Jules François, ophthalmologist (died 1984)
- 11 June – Raoul Henkart, fencer (died 1955)
- 2 July – Jean-Charles Snoy et d'Oppuers, politician (died 1991)
- 11 December – Pol Duwez, scientist (died 1984)

== Deaths ==
- 8 January – Theodoor Verstraete (born 1850), painter
- 21 January – Louis Willems (born 1822), immunologist
- 7 February – Jean-Charles Jacobs (born 1821), entomologist
- 19 June – Léon Herbo (born 1850), painter
- 8 November – Marie Sasse (born 1834), soprano
- 5 December – Charles Leickert (born 1816), painter
- 31 December – Jules de Trooz (born 1857), prime minister
