= 1901 in Belgium =

- Decades: 1880s; 1890s; 1900s; 1910s; 1920s
- See also: Other events of 1901; List of years in Belgium

A map of Belgium (1901)

Events in the year 1901 in Belgium.

== Incumbents ==
- Monarch: Leopold II
- Prime Minister: Paul de Smet de Naeyer

== Events ==
The customs depot in Antwerp after the fire of 8 June 1901

- 8 June – Customs depot in Antwerp burns out
- 25 July – Bishop Antoon Stillemans consecrates Church of St Anthony of Padua, Ghent
- 2 August – Deposits of coal discovered at As in the province of Limburg

== Publications ==
Series

- Biographie Nationale de Belgique, vol. 16.
- Maurice De Wulf launches 15-volume collection Les Philosophes Belges
- Ernest Gilliat-Smith, The Story of Bruges, illustrated by Edith Calvert and Herbert Railton (Medieval Towns Series; London, J.M. Dent)
- Joseph Van den Gheyn, Catalogue des manuscrits de la Bibliothèque royale de Belgique, vol. 1.

Studies

- Eugène Demolder, Constantin Meunier (Brussels, Edmond Deman)
- Pol de Mont, Het schildersboek: Vlaamsche schilders der negentiende eeuw, ed. Max Rooses, vol. 5.

== Art and architecture ==
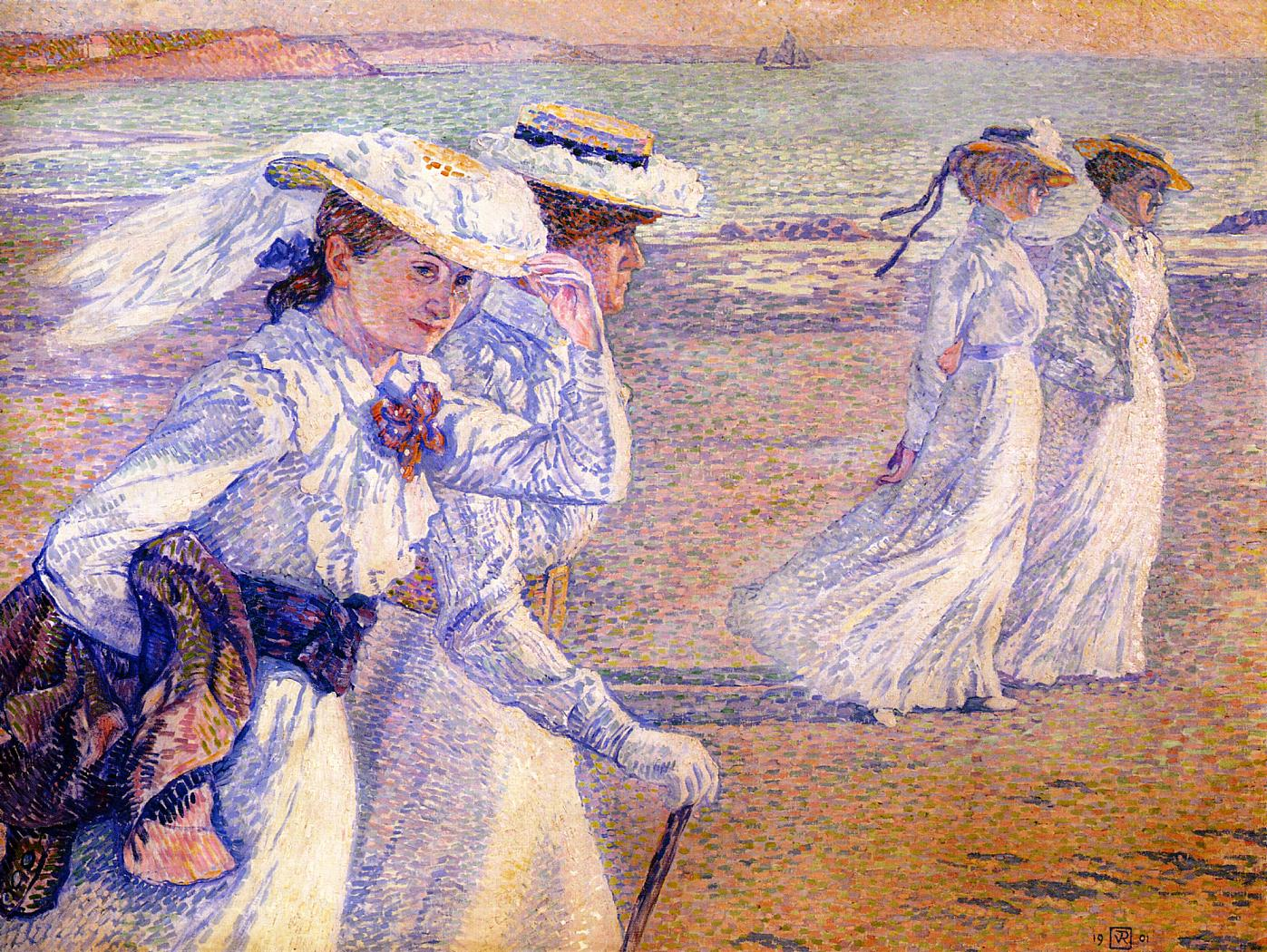
Théo van Rysselberghe, La Promenade (1901)

James Ensor, The Roofs of Ostend (1900–1901)

Paintings

- James Ensor, The Roofs of Ostend
- Théo van Rysselberghe, La Promenade

== Births ==
- 21 May – Suzanne Lilar, writer (died 1992)
- 3 November – Leopold III of Belgium (died 1983)
- 25 December – Marie-Noële Kelly, traveller and hostess (died 1995)

== Deaths ==
Commemorative medal with a portrait of Peter Benoit (1834–1901)

- 20 January – Zénobe Gramme (born 1826), electrical engineer
- 18 February – Egide Walschaerts (born 1820), inventor
- 8 March – Peter Benoit (born 1834), composer
- 30 May – Victor D'Hondt (born 1841), lawyer and mathematician
- 7 July – Euphrosine Beernaert (born 1831), landscape painter
- 24 August – Victor Joseph Doutreloux (born 1837), bishop of Liège
- 22 October – Alfred Ronner (born 1851), artist
