= 1905 in Belgium =

- Decades: 1880s; 1890s; 1900s; 1910s; 1920s
- See also: Other events of 1905; List of years in Belgium

The following lists events that happened during 1905 in the Kingdom of Belgium.

== Incumbents ==
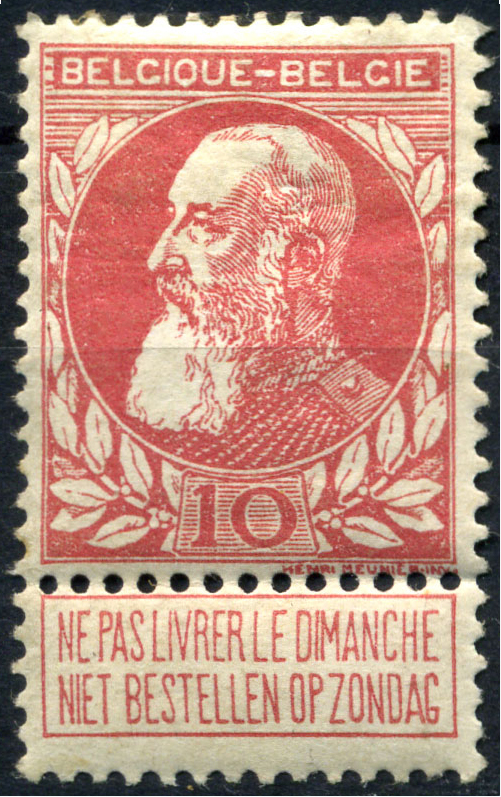
A Belgian postage stamp, 1905

- Monarch: Leopold II
- Prime Minister: Paul de Smet de Naeyer

== Events ==
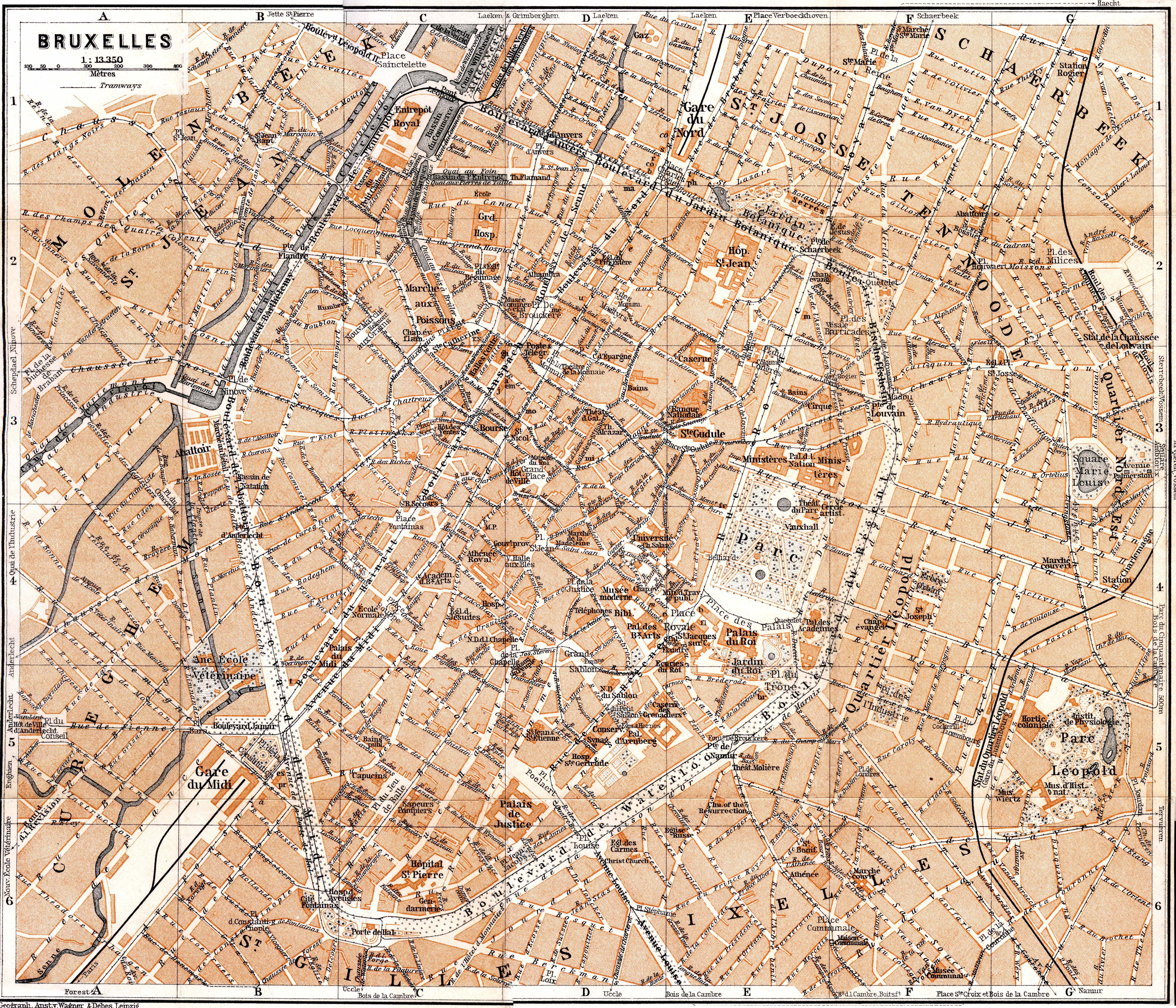
Baedeker map of Brussels, 1905

February

- 5 February – General strike in Belgian coal fields begins.
- 10 February – Belgian Labour Party provides striking miners with 12.5 francs each in strike pay.

March

- 1 March – Art association Kunst van Heden founded in Antwerp.
- 11 March – General strike in the coal fields ends.

April

- 27 April – Opening of the Exposition Universelle et Internationale de Liège.
- 30 April – First international football fixture between Belgium and the Netherlands held in Antwerp; Dutch win 1–4.

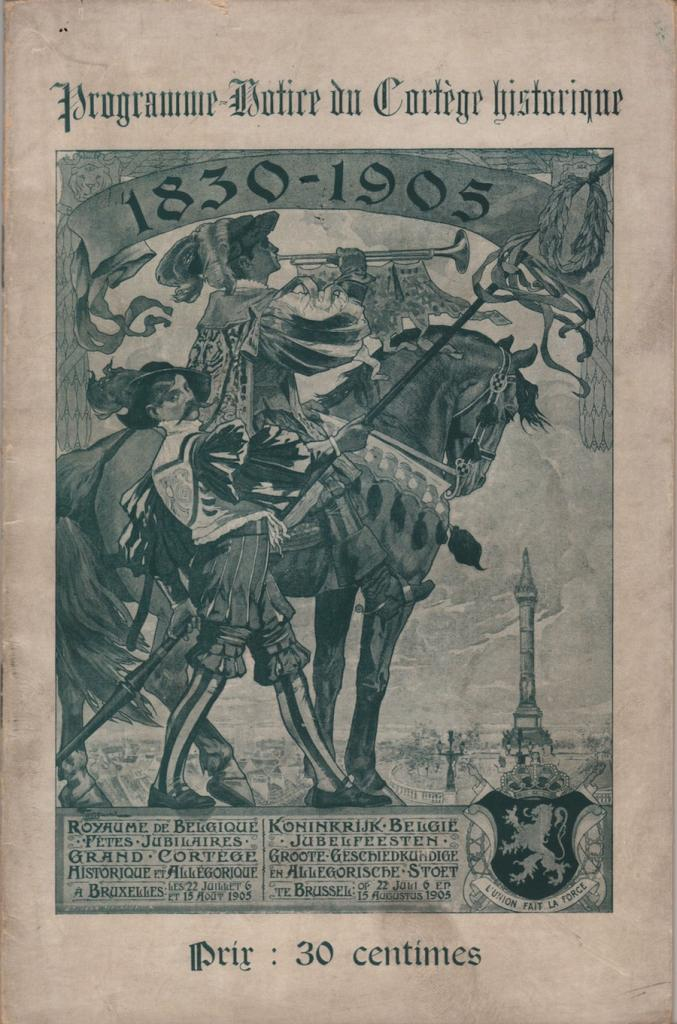
Programme of the pageant to celebrate the 75th anniversary of Belgian independence

May

- 1 May – Season of events to celebrate 75th anniversary of Belgian independence opened.
- 7 May – Belgians win international football fixture against France in Brussels, 7–0.

June

- 23 June – Strikes for shorter hours in Ghent textile mills.

July

- 26 July – Law promulgated making Sunday an obligatory day of rest in trade and industry.
- 27 July – Edward Joris arrested in Istanbul for his part in the Yıldız assassination attempt.

August

- 1 to 6 August – 1905 European Rowing Championships held on the Ghent–Terneuzen Canal in Ghent.
- 12 August – King opens new sports stadium in Antwerp.

September

- 27 September – King ceremonially opens Arcade du Cinquantenaire in Brussels.

October

- 12 October – First stone of the Basilica of the Sacred Heart, Brussels laid.

November

- 5 November – Independent committee of enquiry into abuses in the Congo Free State, set up in response to the publication of the Casement Report the previous year, releases its findings.
- 6 November – Exposition Universelle et Internationale de Liège closes.
- 12 November – Formal opening of the Belgian-engineered Beijing–Hankou railway.
- 25 November – Christian democrats obtain episcopal recognition as a Catholic organisation.
- 30 November – Walloon Congress in Liège to promote the culture of French-speaking Belgium and to oppose the movement for greater use of Dutch in public life.

== Publications ==
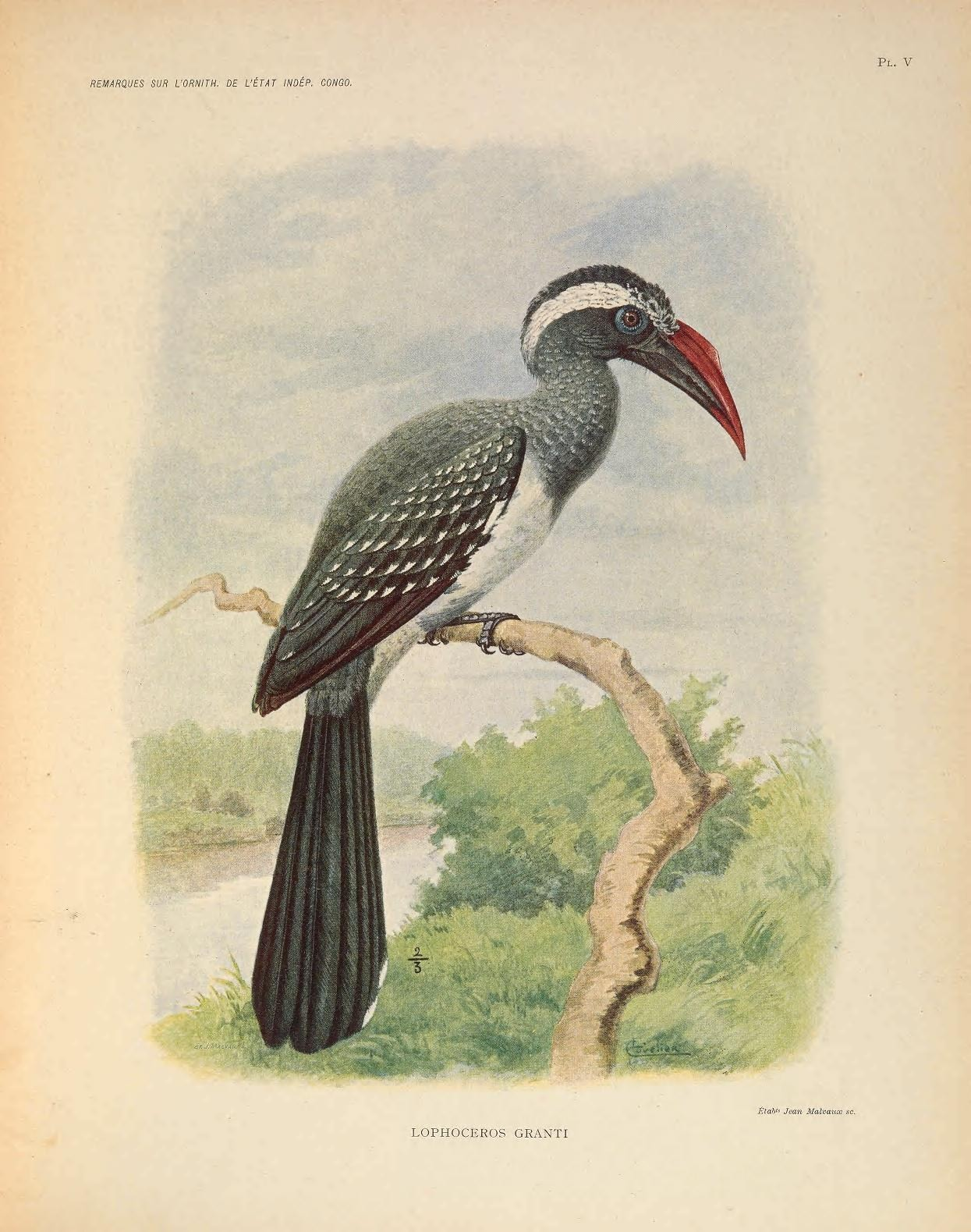
Eastern little hornbill from Alphonse Dubois, Remarques sur l'ornithologie de l'État indépendant du Congo (Brussels, 1905)

- La Nation Belge, 1830-1905, conférences jubilaires faites à l’Exposition Universelle et internationale de Liège en 1905 (Liège, Ch. Desoer & Brussels, P. Weissenbruch)

Periodicals

- La Belgique Artistique et Littéraire begins publication.

Scholarship

- Biographie Nationale de Belgique, vol. 18.
- Ernest Closson, Chansons populaires des provinces belges (Brussels, Mainz, London, Leipzig)
- Alphonse Dubois, Remarques sur l'ornithologie de l'État indépendant du Congo
- Hippolyte Fierens-Gevaert, La Renaissance septentrionale et les premiers maitres des Flandres (Brussels, Librarie Nationale d'Art et d'Histoire)
- Godefroid Kurth, La Patrie Belge: 75è Anniversaire de l'Indépendance Nationale (Namur)
- Joseph Van den Gheyn, Catalogue des manuscrits de la Bibliothèque royale de Belgique, vol. 5.
- Joseph Van den Gheyn, La préhistoire en Belgique (1830-1905) (1905)

Literature

- Mark Twain, King Leopold's Soliloquy (Boston)
- Émile Verhaeren, Les heures d'après-midi (Brussels, Edmond Deman)

== Art and architecture ==
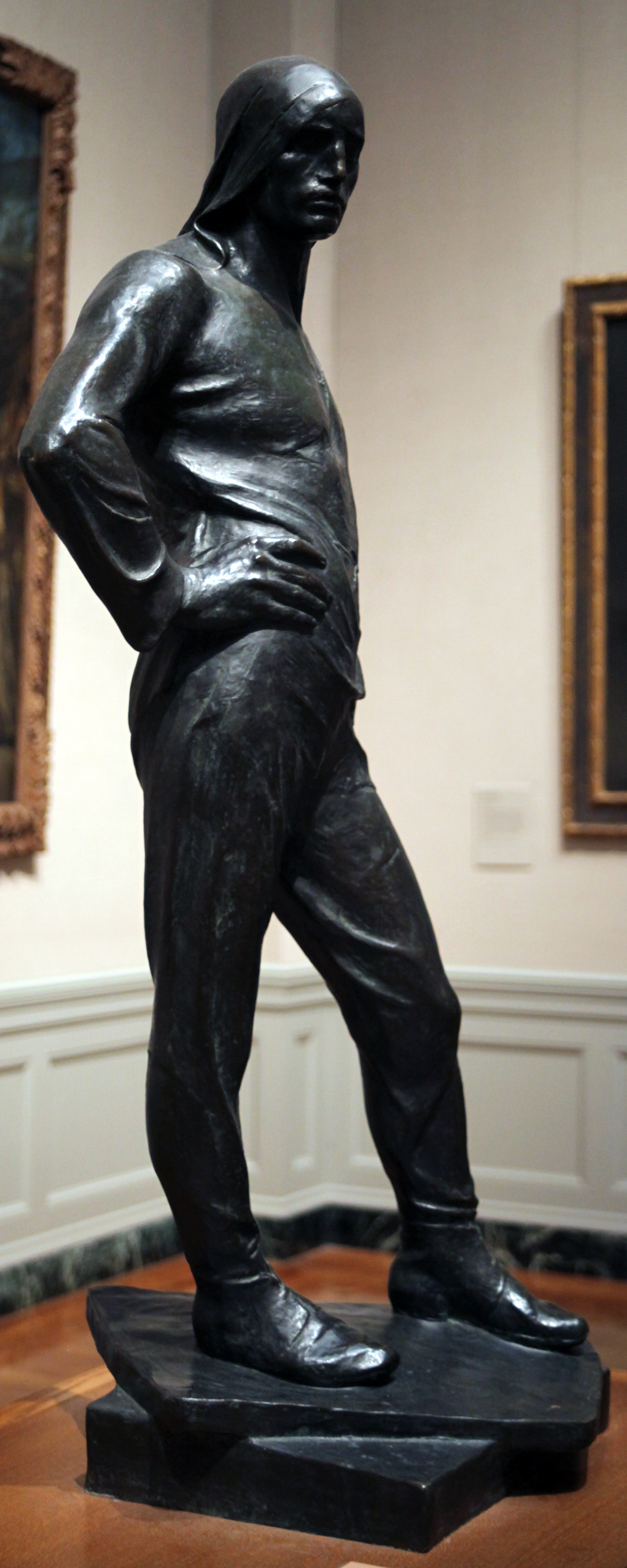
Constantin Meunier, The Docker (1905)

Exhibitions

- 15 July to 2 November – Retrospective of Belgian art, 1830-1905, Brussels

Sculpture

- Constantin Meunier, The Docker

Buildings

- Victor Horta, Magasins Waucquez
- Gédéon Bordiau and Charles Girault, Arcade du Cinquantenaire, Brussels

== Births ==
- 15 January – Jean Van Buggenhout, cyclist (died 1974)
- 10 March – René Bernier, composer (died 1984)
- 28 March – Jenny Toitgans, athlete
- 1 April – Gaston Eyskens, politician (died 1988)
- 3 April – Georges Lemaire, cyclist (died 1933)
- 10 April – Edgard Viseur, athlete
- 4 May – Désiré Acket, painter (died 1987)
- 21 June – Alfred De Taeye, politician (died 1958)
- 6 July – Suzanne Spaak, resistance operative (died 1944)
- 22 October – Maurice Geldhof, cyclist (died 1970)
- 17 November – Astrid of Sweden, Queen of the Belgians (died 1935)
- 27 November – Daniel Sternefeld, composer (died 1986)
- 18 December – Jane Graverol, painter (died 1984)

== Deaths ==
- 9 March – Paul Costermans (born 1860), deputy governor general of the Congo Free State, by his own hand
- 4 April – Constantin Meunier (born 1831), painter and sculptor
- 9 April – Léon d'Andrimont (born 1836), politician
- 23 April – Théodore Nilis (born 1851), colonial official
- 6 August – Léo Errera (born 1858), plant physiologist
- 10 August – Georges Nagelmackers (born 1845), engineer and entrepreneur
- 17 November – Prince Philippe, Count of Flanders (born 1837), heir presumptive to the Belgian throne.
- 12 December – Reimond Stijns (born 1850), writer
