= 1902 in Belgium =

- Decades: 1880s; 1890s; 1900s; 1910s; 1920s
- See also: Other events of 1902; List of years in Belgium

Events in the year 1902 in Belgium.

== Incumbents ==
- Monarch: Leopold II
- Prime Minister: Paul de Smet de Naeyer

== Events ==
- 6 February – Contract signed for the Belgian concession of Tianjin.
- 11 February – Police and universal suffrage demonstrators are involved in a physical altercation in Brussels.
- 18 April – Clashes in Leuven between the civic guard and demonstrators for universal manhood suffrage leave six workers dead and fourteen injured.
- 25 May – Belgian general election, 1902
- 15 June – Exposition des primitifs flamands à Bruges opens (to 5 October).
- 3 July – Prince Albert and Princess Elisabeth visit Bruges for the Exposition des primitifs flamands à Bruges.
- 17–25 August – "Groeninghefeesten": pageants and celebrations to mark the sixth centenary of the Battle of the Golden Spurs in Kortrijk.
- 19 August – Antoon Stillemans, bishop of Ghent, consecrates the new abbey church of Dendermonde Abbey, built in Gothic Revival style.
- 3–7 September – Fourteenth International Eucharistic Congress held in Namur.
- 15 November – Italian anarchist Gennaro Rubino fails to assassinate Leopold II.

== Publications ==
Studies and reports

- Annuaire de la Législation du Travail, 1901 (Brussels, Ministère de l'Industrie et du Travail, 1902)

Exhibitions

- William Henry James Weale, Exposition des Primitifs flamands et d'Art ancien (Bruges, Desclée, De Brouwer)

Scholarship

- Paul Fredericq, Corpus documentorum inquisitionis haereticae pravitatis Neerlandicae, vol. 5.
- Henri Pirenne, Histoire de Belgique, vol. 1, revised edition.
- Joseph Van den Gheyn, Catalogue des manuscrits de la Bibliothèque royale de Belgique, vol. 2.

Literature

- Stijn Streuvels, Langs de wegen

== Art and architecture ==
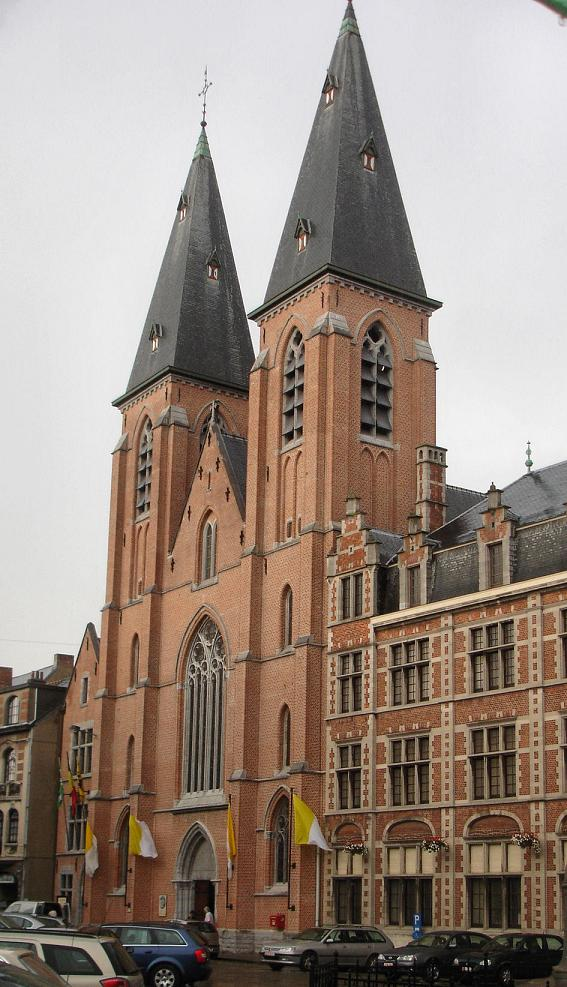
Abbey Church in Dendermonde

Buildings

- Gothic Revival Abbey Church in Dendermonde

== Births ==
- 21 January – Paul Harsin, historian (died 1983)
- 3 March — Hélène Mallebrancke, civil engineer and resister (died 1940)
- 19 March – Louisa Ghijs, actress (died 1985)
- 11 July – Leo Collard, politician (died 1981)
- 21 August – Omer Becu, trade unionist (died 1982)
- 10 November – Jean Denis, collaborator (died 1992)

== Deaths ==
- 23 November – Cornelius Van Leemputten (born 1841), painter
