= 1903 in Belgium =

- Decades: 1880s; 1890s; 1900s; 1910s; 1920s
- See also: Other events of 1903; List of years in Belgium

Events in the year 1903 in Belgium.

== Incumbents ==
- Monarch: Leopold II
- Prime Minister: Paul de Smet de Naeyer

== Events ==
- 30 July-6 August – 2nd Congress of the Russian Social Democratic Labour Party in Brussels.
- 15 August – German-Belgian railway convention signed.

== Publications ==
- Biographie Nationale de Belgique, vol. 17.
- Henri Pirenne, Histoire de Belgique, vol. 2
- Max Rooses, Rubens' leven en werken
- Joseph Van den Gheyn, Catalogue des manuscrits de la Bibliothèque royale de Belgique, vol. 3.
- Emile Vandervelde, L'Exode rural et le retour aux champs

== Art and architecture ==
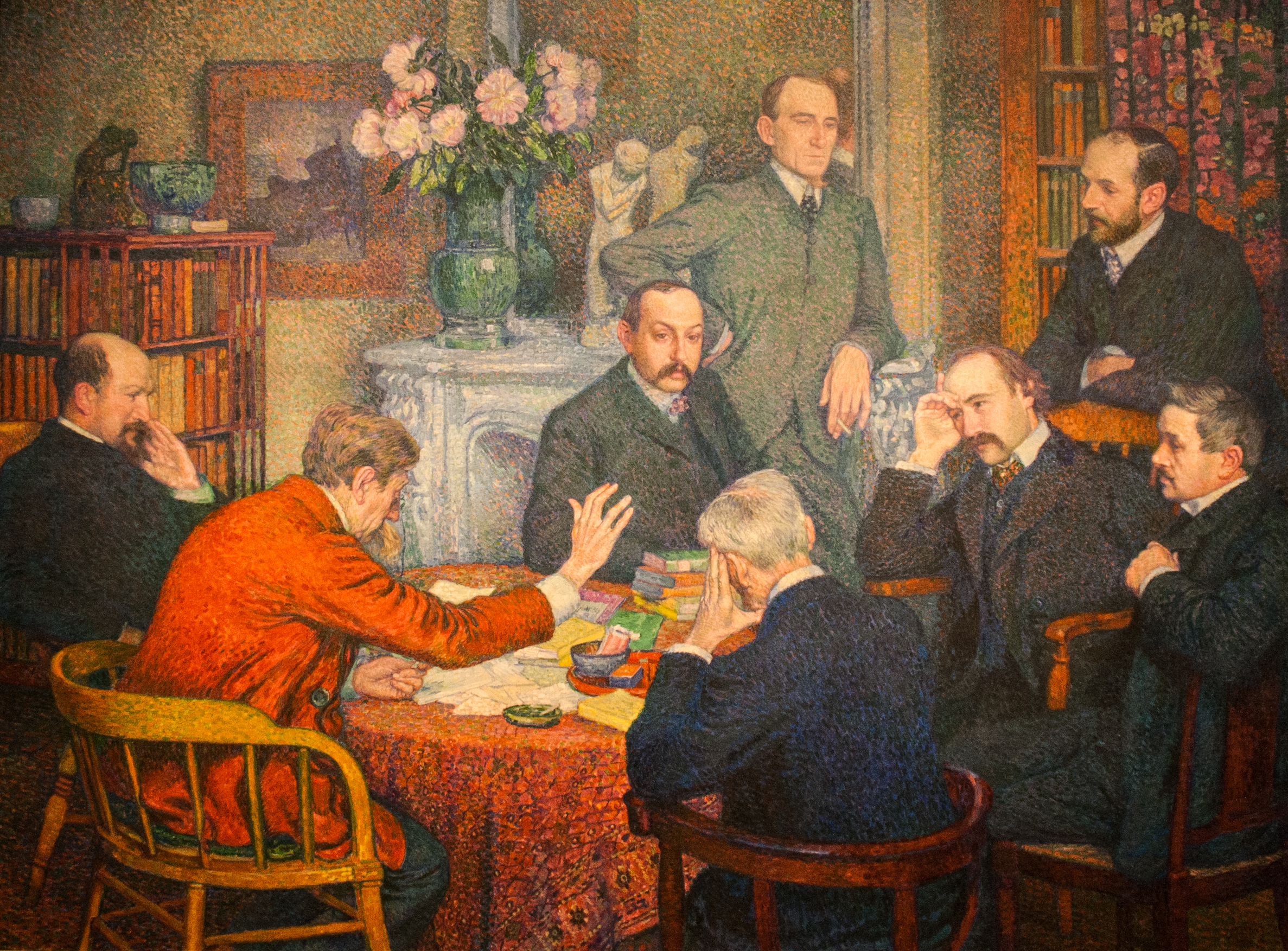
Théo van Rysselberghe, The Reading (1903)

- Théo van Rysselberghe, The Reading

== Births ==
- 8 June – Marguerite Yourcenar, French novelist (died 1987)
- 14 July – Henricus Cockuyt, Olympic sprinter (died 1993)
- 19 August - Gérard Devos, footballer (died 1972)

== Deaths ==
- 19 June – Fernande de Cartier de Marchienne (born 1872)
- 21 July – Henri Alexis Brialmont (born 1821), military architect
