= 1908 in Belgium =

- Decades: 1880s; 1890s; 1900s; 1910s; 1920s
- See also: Other events of 1908; List of years in Belgium

The following lists events that happened during 1908 in the Kingdom of Belgium.

== Incumbents ==
- Monarch: Leopold II
- Prime Minister: Frans Schollaert

== Events ==
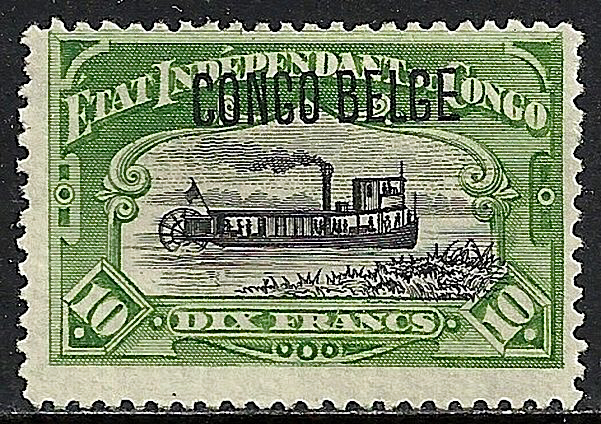
Congo Free State postage stamp franked Belgian Congo

- 9 January – Frans Schollaert formally takes office as prime minister, after the sudden death of Jules de Trooz at the end of the previous year.
- 19 April – Confédération syndicale belge organization is founded.
- 24 May – Partial legislative elections
- 25 May – Parliament ratifies the 1907 copyright convention with Germany.
- 14 June – Provincial elections
- 10 July – Paul Van Asbroeck wins a gold medal at the 1908 Olympic Games
- 30 September – Premiere of Maurice Maeterlinck's The Blue Bird at the Moscow Art Theatre
- 18 October – Belgian Parliament passes the Colonial Charter on the Belgian annexation of the Congo Free State.
- 30 October – Cabinet reshuffle with Jules Renkin becoming first Minister for Colonies
- 15 November – Congo Free State becomes Belgian Congo
- 22 November – Tobacco Workers' Union established

== Publications ==
- Émile de Borchgrave, Souvenirs diplomatiques de quarante ans (Brussels)
- Fernand Crommelynck, Le sculpteur de masques (Brussels, Edmond Deman)
- Stijn Streuvels, Tieghem: Het Vlaamsche lustoord (Ghent, Vercauteren)
- Joseph Van den Gheyn, Catalogue des manuscrits de la Bibliothèque royale de Belgique, vol. 8.
- Emile Verhaeren, James Ensor (Brussels, G. Van Oest)

Periodicals

- L'Expansion belge begins publication.

== Art and architecture ==
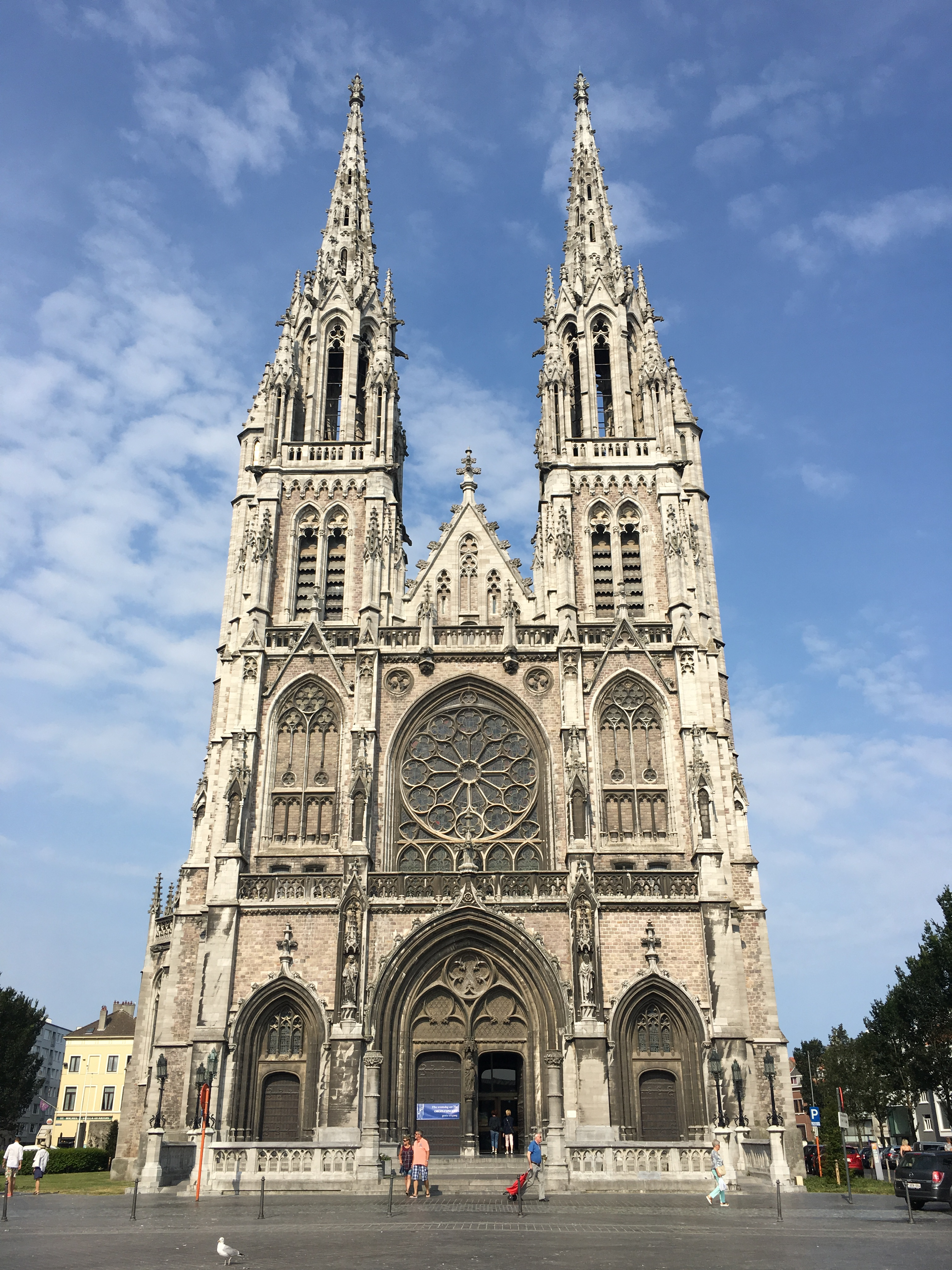
Sint-Petrus-en-Pauluskerk, Ostend

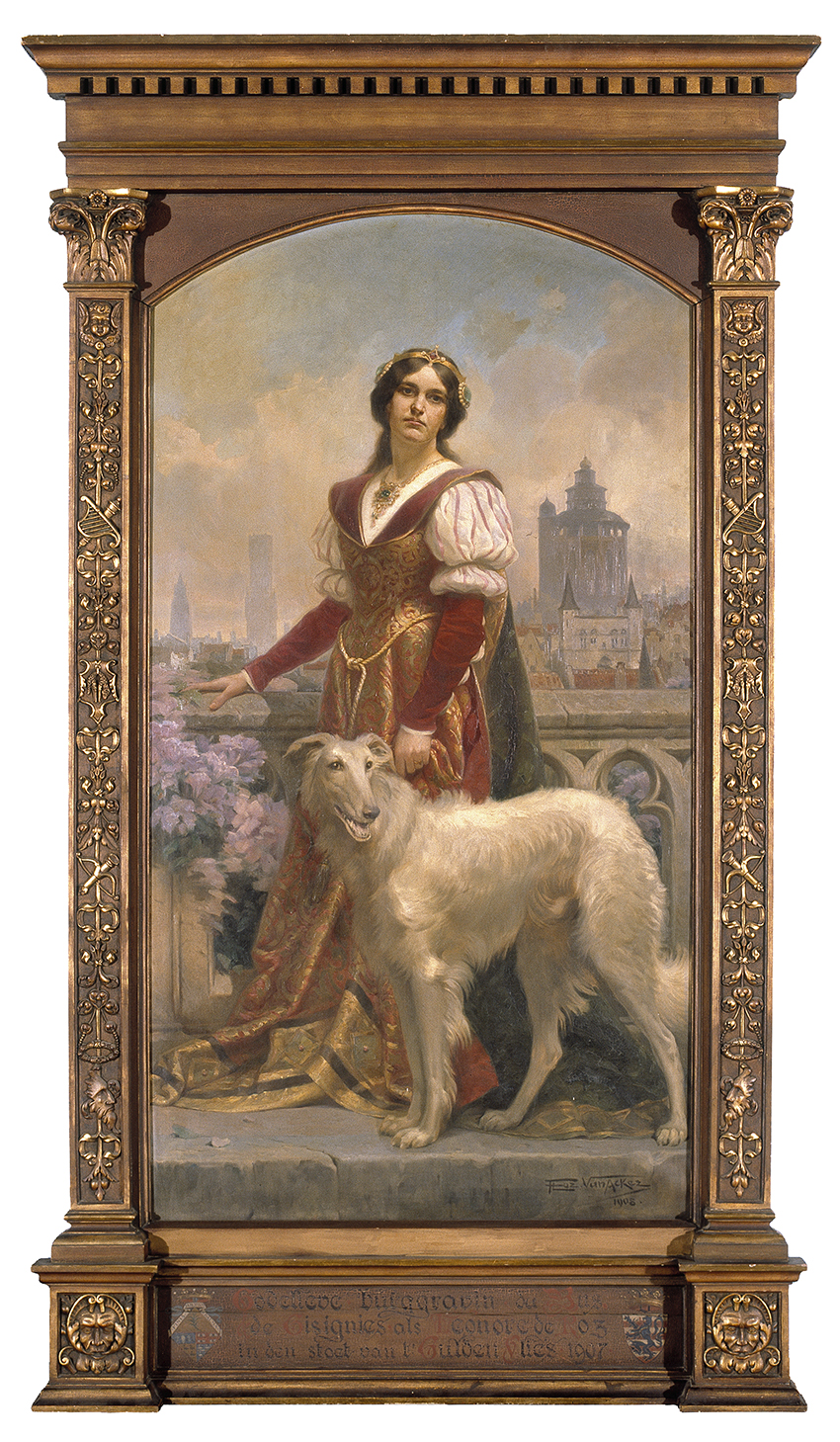
Flori van Acker, Portrait of Godelieve du Bus de Gésignies (1908)

Buildings

- Sint-Petrus-en-Pauluskerk, Ostend (begun 1899)

Paintings

- Flori van Acker, Portrait of Godelieve du Bus de Gésignies

Films

- Durch Brüssel in 10 Minuten (9-minute documentary).

== Births ==
- 2 January – André Verbeke, architect (died 1978)
- 23 January – Stanislas-André Steeman, writer (died 1970)
- 14 March – Joseph André, priest (died 1973)
- 14 May – Jules Lismonde, artist (died 2001)
- 20 September – Simon Dewinter, boxer (died 1972)
- 4 October – Celeste van Exem, missionary (died 1993)
- 16 November – Emmanuelle Cinquin, religious sister (died 2008)
- 24 November – Hubert Ansiaux, banker (died 1987)
- 28 November – Claude Lévi-Strauss, anthropologist (died 2009)

== Deaths ==
- 4 February – Albert Lancaster (born 1849), meteorologist
- 6 February – Jan Portielje (born 1829), painter
- 22 February – Édouard van den Corput (born 1821), physician
- 10 May – Eugène Lafont (born 1837), missionary
- 5 June – Jef Lambeaux (born 1852), sculptor
- 21 June – Luís Cruls (born 1848), astronomer
- 19 June – Louis van Waefelghem (born 1840), viola d'amore player
- 4 August – Piet Verhaert (born 1852), painter
- 24 December – François-Auguste Gevaert (born 1828), musicologist
