= Piatus =

Piatus may refer to:

- Piatus of Tournai (d. 286), bishop of Tournai and saint
- Piatus of Mons (1815–1904), French theologian
