= Akarova =

Artist, choreographer, dancer (1904–1999)

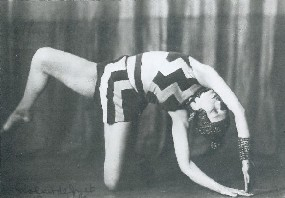
Akarova.

Marguerite Acarin (30 March 1904, in Saint-Josse-ten-Noode – 24 June 1999, in Ixelles) was a Belgian dancer, choreographer, and artist.

== Biography ==
Acarin is generally known by her stage-name, Akarova. She was called "the Belgian Isadora Duncan". She studied music and dance under Émile Jaques-Dalcroze, creator of eurhythmics, after which she joined the Antwerp ballet. She soon left due to disputes with the ballet mistress..

In 1922, attending a meeting arranged by Isadora Duncan's brother Raymond, she met artist Marcel-Louis Baugniet, with whom she would collaborate for many years. Baugniet coined Marguerite's stage name. They married on 31 October 1923, but separated in 1928. In this period she danced, choreographed, and designed sets and costumes, in performances to works by composers such as Igor Stravinski and Maurice Ravel. Her second marriage, to artistic patron Louis Lievens, took place on 6 April 1935. This marriage too ended in a separation, in 1939.

Noted Brussels architect Jean-Jules Eggericx constructed a studio, performance venue, and home, for Akarova at number 72, Avenue de l'Hippodrome, Ixelles, in 1937. The venue opened on 30 January 1937 with performances by Akarova from Francis Poulenc's Les Biches, Maurice Ravel's Boléro, and Igor Stravinsky's The Rite of Spring. Performances at the Avenue de l'Hippodrome ended in 1957. After the closure, Akarova devoted her time to painting and sculpture. She died at home in 1999.

== Filmography ==
In 1991, artist Ana Torfs and graphic designer Jurgen Persijn created the video portrait Akarova & Baugniet / L'entre-deux-guerres (Ana Torfs and Jurgen Persijn, 1991). The portrait evokes the life course of both Akarova and Marcel-Louis Baugniet with the help of witness reports and archival material, and places their life and work as artists in the context of the Belgian avant-garde from the interbellum.

In 1991 also Michel Jakar made a video documentary about Akarova: J'aurais aimé vous voir dancer ... Madame Akarova (Michel Jakar, 1991). In the video seven young choreographers / dancers (Michèle Noiret, Marc Vanrunxt, Patricia Kuypers, Nicole Mossoux, Michèle Anne De Mey, Marie Chouinard and Karine Saporta) come together with Akarova in the Akarova studio.

== In Search of Akarova ==
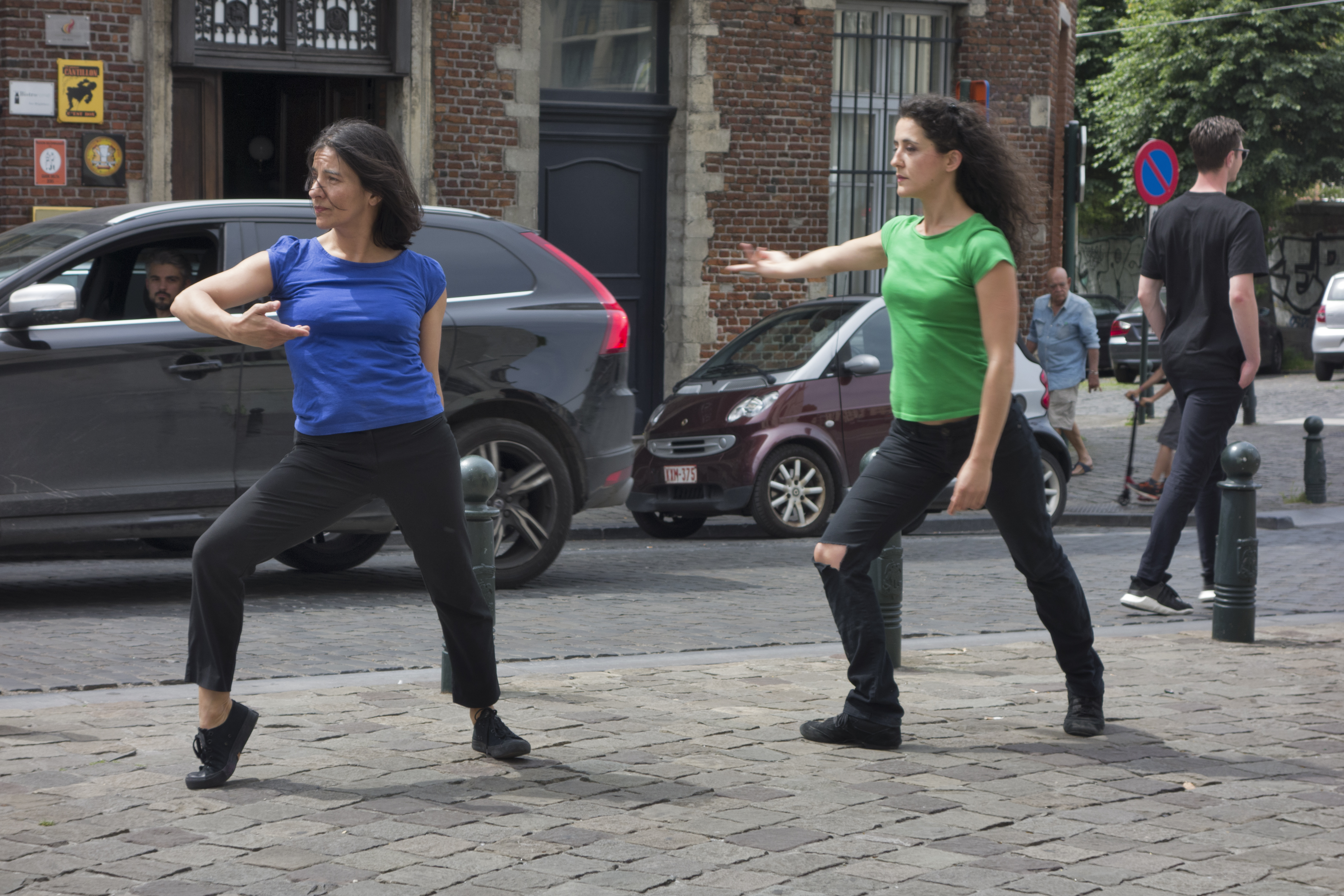
Performance of 'Two Women and a Drummer' within the framework of the project 'In Search for Akarova' at Kapellemarkt / Place de la Chapelle, Brussels. Choreographers: Johanne Saunier, Ine Claes. Drums: Joâo Lobo. Performers: Johanne Saunier (left), Ine Claes (right).

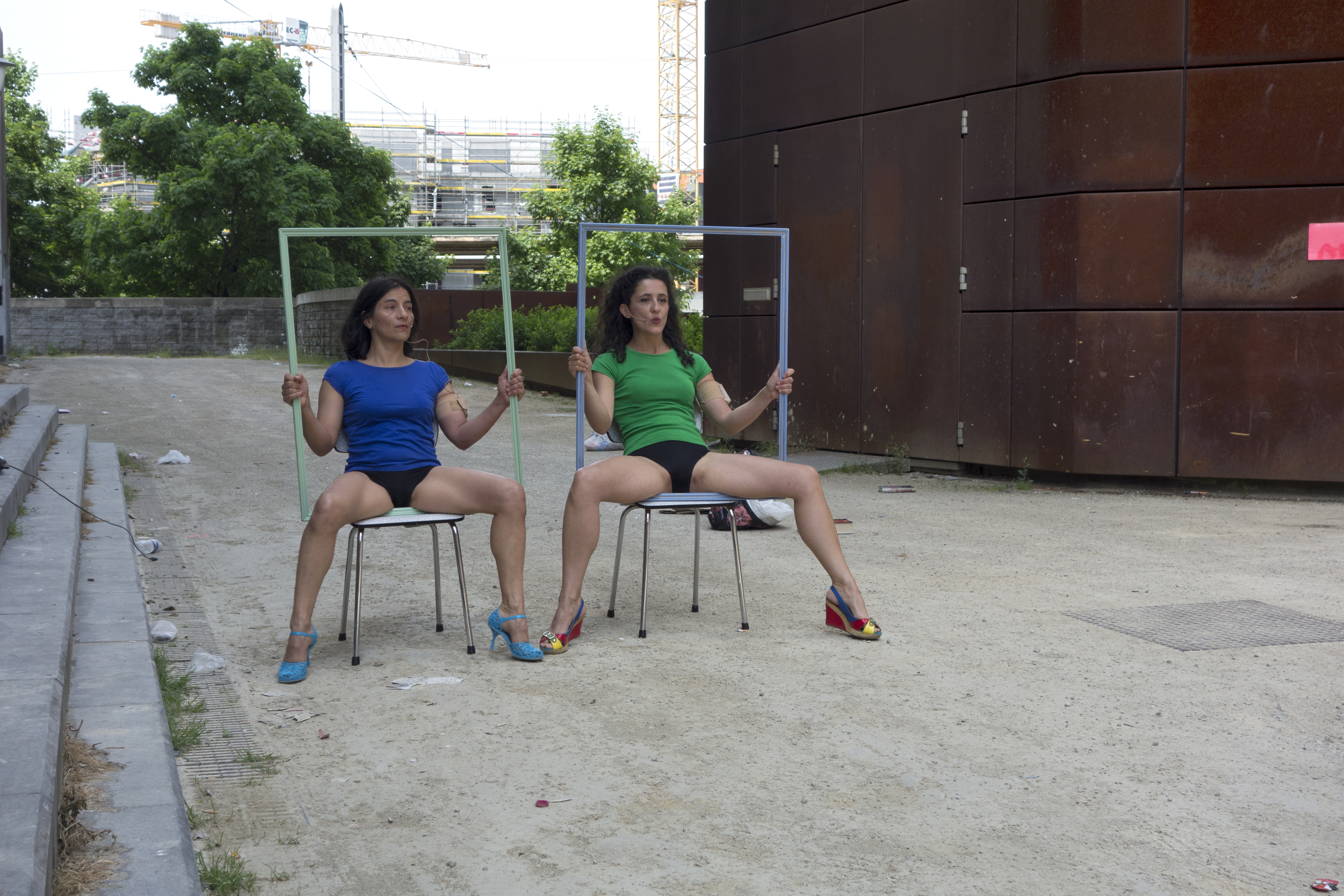
Performance of 'I'm Happy to Separate my Legs' within the framework of the project 'In Search for Akarova' at Akarovaplein / Place Akarova, Brussels. Choreographers: Johanne Saunier, Ine Claes. Text: Martin Crimp. Performers: Johanne Saunier (left), Ine Claes (right).

From 30 April to 11 June 2017, Ballets Confidentiels, a collaboration between choreographers/dancers Johanne Saunier and Ine Claes, organized the project In Search of Akarova. During that period they performed every Sunday a short dance performance, each time at a different location in Brussels. The choice of the different locations was inspired by the life of Akarova, and included the Madouplein / place Madou Saint-Josse-ten-Noode), the Museumstraat / rue du Musée (Brussels), the Koninginneplein / place de la Reine (Schaerbeek, the Park Pierre Paulus / Parc Pierre Paulus (Saint-Gilles), the Akarovaplein / Place Akarova and the Brigitinnenstraat / rue Brigittines (Brussels), the Kapellemarkt / marché de la Chapelle (Brussels), the Weststation / gare de l'Ouest (Molenbeek-Saint-Jean) and the Akarovastraat / rue Akarova (Ixelles). Besides Johanne Saunier and Ine Claes, the dancer Guida Inês Mauricio, the musical duo Different Fountains and the drummers Joâo Lobo and Mathieu Calleja also participated in the project.

== Streets and squares named after Akarova ==
In 2006, Les Brigittines, the Brussels Contemporary Art Center for Movement and Dance, proposed to the city of Brussels to rename the space behind the Brigittinenkapel / Chapelle des Brigittines. The reason was the expansion of art center and the change of view of the existing street behind the Brigittinenkapel. In April 2008, the space was officially renamed Akarovaplein / place Akarova, in honor of Akarova, who was a pioneer for Brussels in the field of movement and dance. Also in Elsene / Ixelles a street was named after Akarova: the Akarovastraat / rue Akarova.
