= Edgard Darimont =

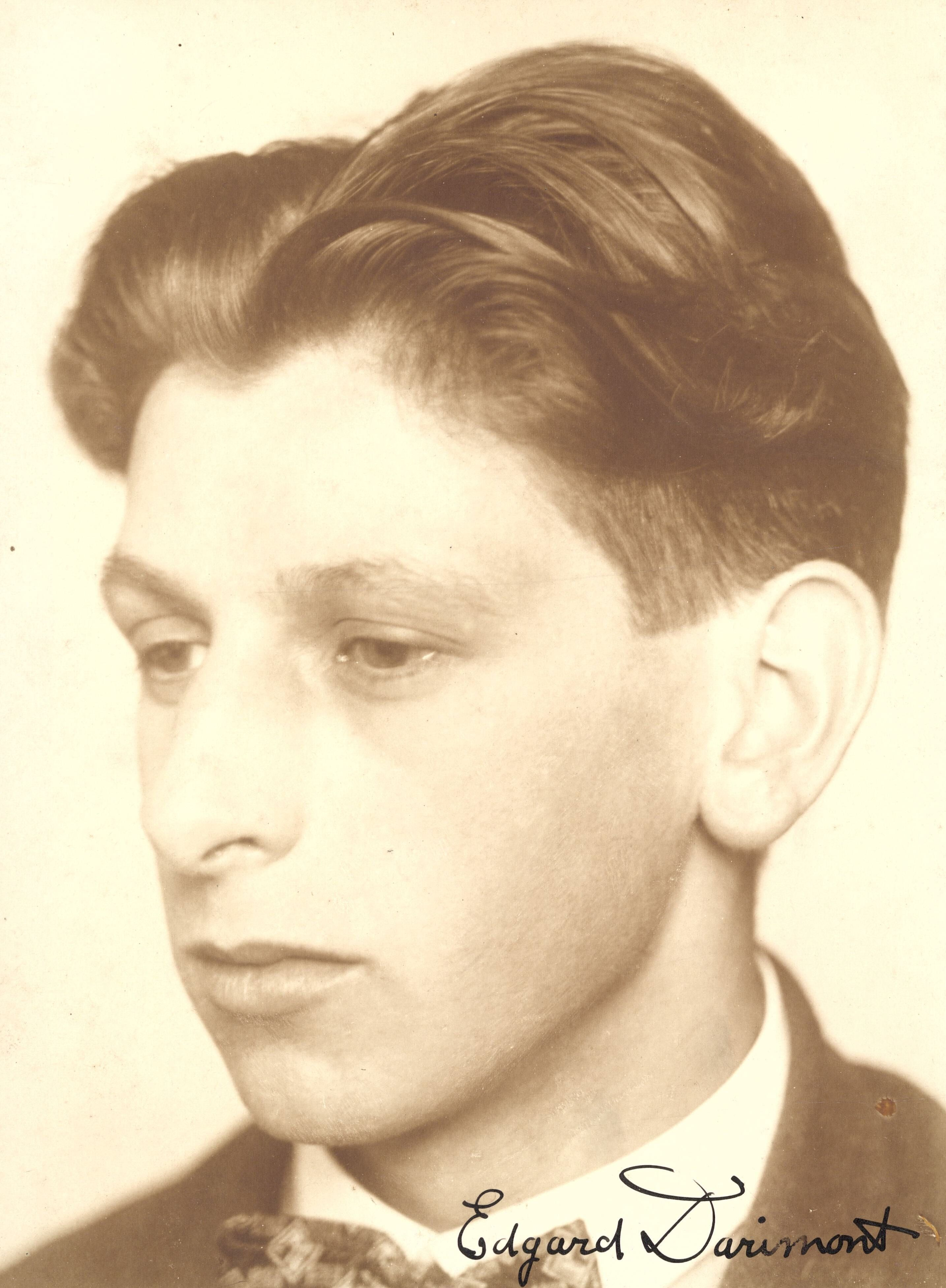
- Photo of Edgard Darimont, around 1925
- Born: 30 August 1909; Hasselt, Belgium
- Died: 14 August 1980 (aged 70); Lanaken, Belgium
- Known for: Painting, graphic arts

Edgard Darimont (1909-1980) was a graphic designer from Hasselt who gained recognition for his posters, advertising designs, and paintings for shop windows and company vehicles for numerous businesses in Hasselt and far beyond. His work for the Antwerp Zoo and Tierpark Hagenbeck in Hamburg is famous among poster collectors and graphic design enthusiasts.

== Early life and education ==
Edgard Darimont was born on 30 August 1909, in Hasselt. He received the family name of his unmarried mother. During the First World War, he grew up with his grandparents in Hasselt. After World War I, his mother moved to Hamburg, where she married Paul Harnisch. Edgard stayed in Hasselt. From the age of twelve, he attended evening classes at the art school and worked at a printing company, presumably Roose printing. He worked long days there. In 1924, when Edgard was fifteen, his mother decided to bring him to Germany.

In Hamburg, he learned the German language and attended evening classes at the school for graphic design.

== Career ==
Thanks to an apprenticeship contract, he was able to work at the renowned lithographic printing company Adolf Friedländer. Darimont quickly proved his talent. At Friedländer he designed five posters for Hagenbeck Zoo.

In 1929, Darimont returned to Belgium to complete his military service in Liège. But after three days, he became ill and ended up in the hospital. He was discharged from the army and moved to Brussels, where he attended classes at the academy in Molenbeek while living in Laeken with his uncle Urbain, who was active in the circus world, including with Circus Demuynck. Edgard probably hoped to find work in Brussels.

However, due to the economic crisis, he could not find work in Brussels. At the end of 1930, he moved to Deurne, where his mother and her German husband Paul Harnisch were living at the time. In Antwerp he sought contact with the Zoo. He designed two striking posters for the zoo and a magazine cover for Cine Zoologie. In 1931 he started the advertising studio Ocapi with graphic artist René Van Poppel, but their collaboration was short. During this period, he worked as a freelancer for various lithographic printing companies in Antwerp and Brussels, as well as for the Roose printing company in Hasselt.

In 1935, Darimont married Maria Hendrikx (1914-1995). The young couple moved to Hasselt, where Darimont could work for printer Ernest Roose. In June 1940, he offered himself – because he mastered German – as an interpreter between the city administration and the German occupiers. In August started to work full-time as an interpreter for the city and as a liaison between the Feldkommandantur and, among others, wartime mayor Jef Deumens. During World War II, Darimont remained active as a graphic designer.

At the liberation in September 1944, Darimont was arrested and taken into provisional detention. He was interned in Hasselt, Zwartberg, and Merksplas. On 12 March 1946, the military court sentenced him to five years of imprisonment due to his work as an interpreter and liaison between the mayor and the Germans. Because of this role, he had access to sensitive information, which partly influenced the penalty. After staying in the Beverlo internment camp and the prisons of Verviers, Saint-Gilles, and Merksplas, he was released early on 10 September 1947.

Once free, Darimont was able to return to work at the Roose printing house, this time as a freelancer. As a “self-employed advertising designer,” he worked for various companies, which made him a popular designer in the post-war years. In 1974, Darimont stopped working. He died on 14 August 1980, in Lanaken, after a period of dementia.

== Work ==
Darimont is one of the few Belgian poster designers who was influenced by major figures in German graphic art, such as Ludwig Hohlwein (1874-1949) and Lucian Bernhard (1883-1972). This is especially evident in his early period. In the beginning, he signed his posters with the pseudonym 'DARI MED'. From 1932 onwards, he used his full name. Animals were a beloved theme for Edgard Darimont. Together with Jos Michielssen (an independent advertising designer for the Antwerp printing company De Smet), he was responsible for the interwar advertising posters of the Antwerp Zoo. He also designed posters for various companies and organizations and created a wide range of promotional material for all kinds of businesses. His productivity was impressive and diverse in form.
He made an important contribution to the visual identity of many companies. After World War II, he expanded his advertising work to new forms of advertising graphics. From then on, he also focused on the graphic design of neon signs, promotional inscriptions on walls, facades, and vehicles, and advertising panels in sports stadiums.

Darimont worked for Hasselt gin distilleries such as Fryns and Smeets, as well as for the Antwerp liqueur manufacturer Heldens, the tobacco processing company Baai-Fina in Alken, the Brussels brewery Wielemans-Ceuppens, and the colonial goods trader Keyenbergh in Sint-Truiden.

The exhibition 'Jenever en ZOO', which ran from 27 September 2025 to 4 January 2026 at the Jenever Museum in Hasselt (Belgium), provided an overview of his publicity work.

=== Posters ===
A total of 31 executed posters by Edgard Darimont are known. Some examples:

- Five posters for Tierpark Hagenbeck in Hamburg (1927-1928). Printed by the lithographic printer Adolf Friedländer. Copies of these posters are preserved in the circus collection of the Allard Pierson Museum in Amsterdam.
- Castle Couwelaer / 1st Tourism Exhibition / 1re Exposition de Tourisme (1932). Printed by the lithographic printer Lombaerts, Deurne. Two different copies are preserved in the Letterenhuis in Antwerp.
- Calais Dover / Liliane Harvey (1931). Film poster printed by Les Atelier Maurice Panneels, Molenbeek.
- Sint-Jan Berchmans College Genk / Preparatory Year - High School (1933). Printed by printer Roose, Hasselt.
- Two posters for Antwerp Zoo: poster with giraffes (1935) and poster with penguins (1933).
- Swimming Dock - Hasselt / Grand Swimming Festival (1938/1949).
