= Ana Torfs =

Belgian visual artist

- Born: 1963 (age 62–63); Mortsel
- Education: KU Leuven, LUCA School of Arts
- Known for: visual art

Ana Torfs (born in 1963, Mortsel) is a Belgian visual artist.

In her installations she uses a wide range of reproducible media, including slide projections, audio, photographs, prints, video, tapestries, and film.

== Life ==
Torfs studied communication science at the University of Leuven and film and video at the Sint-Lukas University College of Art and Design in Brussels. Torfs has lived and worked in Brussels since 1986.

Torfs has had solo exhibitions at "MUAC". in Mexico, City (2021), at "Bozar". in Brussels (2020) the Pori Art Museum in Finland, in the Calouste Gulbenkian Museum in Lisbon, at Wiels, Centre for Contemporary Arts in Brussels, 2014, at Generali Foundation in Vienna in 2010, at Kunstsammlung Nordrhein-Westfalen in Düsseldorf in 2010, at the Sprengel Museum in Hannover, 2008, at the Argos Centre for Art and Media in Brussels in 2007, at daadgalerie in Berlin, 2006, at Gesellschaft für Aktuelle Kunst in Bremen in 2006, and at Bozar in Brussels in 2000. She has participated in numerous international group exhibitions including the 8th Contour Biennial in Mechelen in 2017, the Parasophia International Festival of Contemporary Culture in Kyoto, 2015, the 1st International Biennial of Contemporary Art of Cartagena de Indias in 2014, the Sharjah Biennial in 2013, the Manifesta 9 in Genk in 2012, the 2nd La Biennale de Montreal in 2000 and the 3rd Lyon Biennale of Contemporary Art in 1995. In 2004 she was invited by the Dia Art Foundation in New York to create a web project. In 2004, A Prior Magazine 10 was dedicated to the work of Ana Torfs.
