= Smeets (distillery) =

Gin distillery in Hasselt, Belgium

Coordinates: 50°55′53″N 5°20′20″E

Smeets is a brand of Hasselt jenever. In the past it was also the name of a distillery in the Belgian town of Hasselt. This distillery was founded in 1923 by Gerard Smeets (1894-1966). Nowadays, Smeets' jenever is produced by La Martiniquaise Benelux.

== History ==
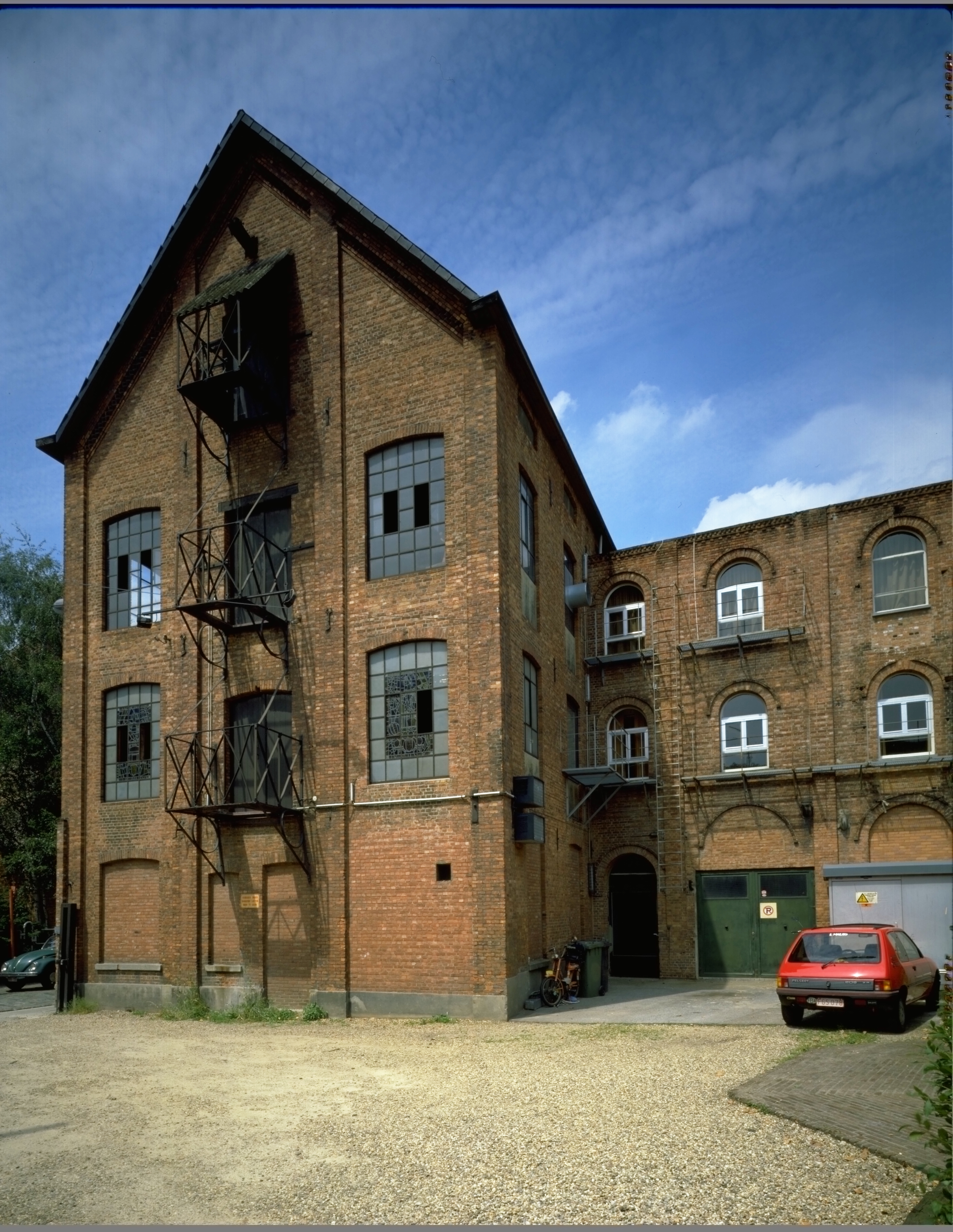
De brandewijnketel (distillery Smeets)

In 1921, Gerard Smeets, his wife Emma Berghmans and his brother Joseph-Antoine opened a business that traded in spirits, liqueurs, aperitifs and tobacco products in Kapelstraat in Hasselt.

In the early years, all of this business's jenever and liqueurs were bought in. To facilitate this Gerard concluded a Limburg exclusivity contract for the Dutch brand De Oude Schiedamsche Genever - Vieux système De Papegaai, produced by the Dutch company Vanverckel & Co. from Delft.

In 1923, Gerard Smeets registered his first own brand of jenever, naming it Oude Genever De Leeuwerik after the distillery he had just opened. The company thereupon switched from reselling to production. In 1928 a further expansion of production led to the purchase of buildings on the Botermarkt (now Zuivelmarkt), with an installation that could also produce liqueurs. The signature green bottle was also introduced. By this time, the company employed seven people.

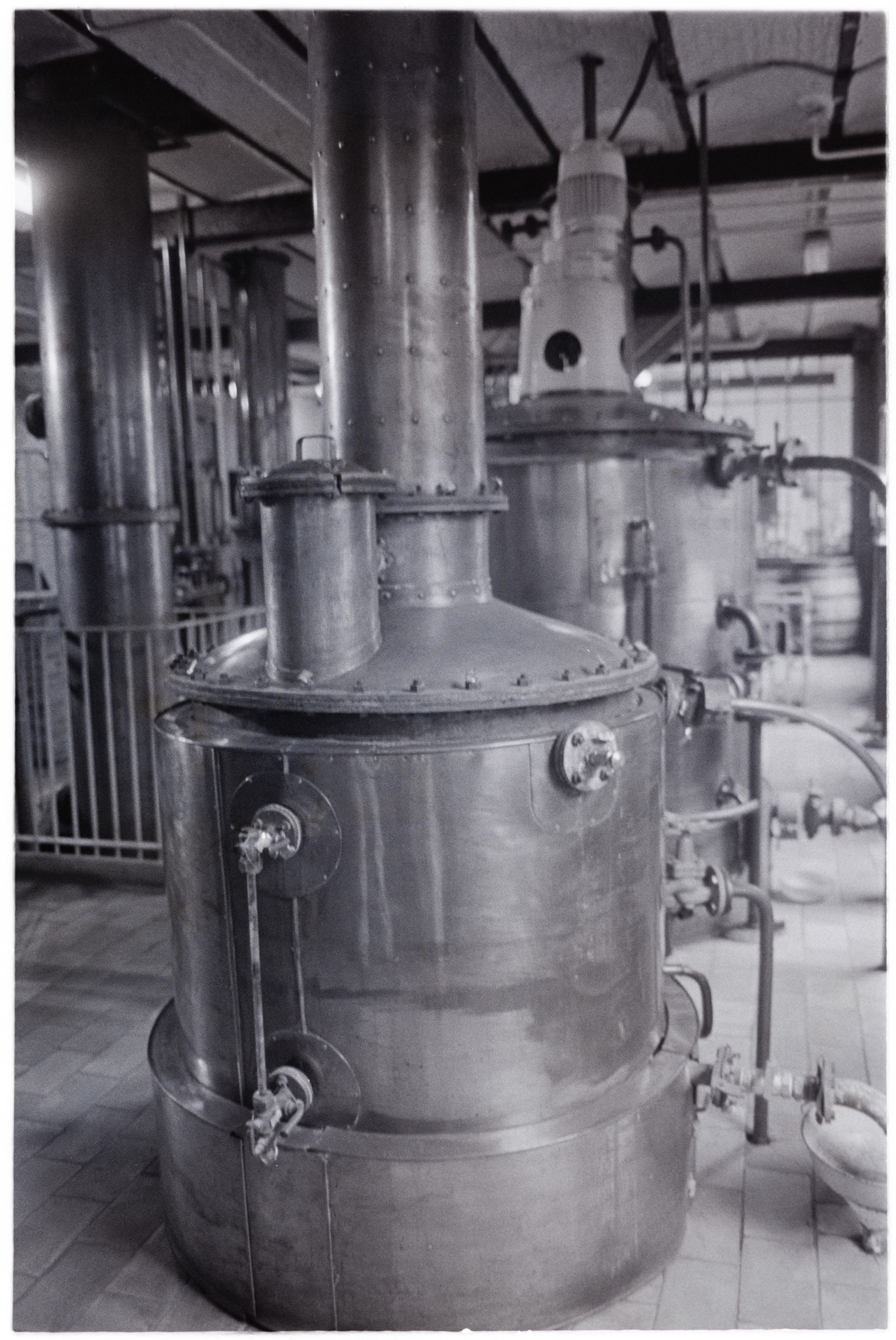
Alembic of distillery Smeets

Between 1941 and 1943 the company expanded further. Gérard bought a building complex that ran from Paardsdemerstraat to Raamstraat from nv Malteries Brepoels-Schoofs, for example. Some of the buildings on Raamstraat were connected to the buildings on the Botermarkt (now Zuivelmarkt). When Gerard Smeets died in 1966, his son Louis had already started to build a new distillery in Sasstraat.

Over three generations, the small family-owned shop grew into a modern production company with sites at various locations in Hasselt inner city. The workforce had meanwhile grown from 15 people in 1930 to 45 people just before the move to Sasstraat.

In 1977, grandson Jo took the lead and under him the company experienced strong growth. At its peak – when exports greatly increased in the 1970s and 1980s – Smeets Distillery employed around 100 people. The company slogan was ‘Zoveel beter, en van bij ons’ (+/-.So much better, and local).

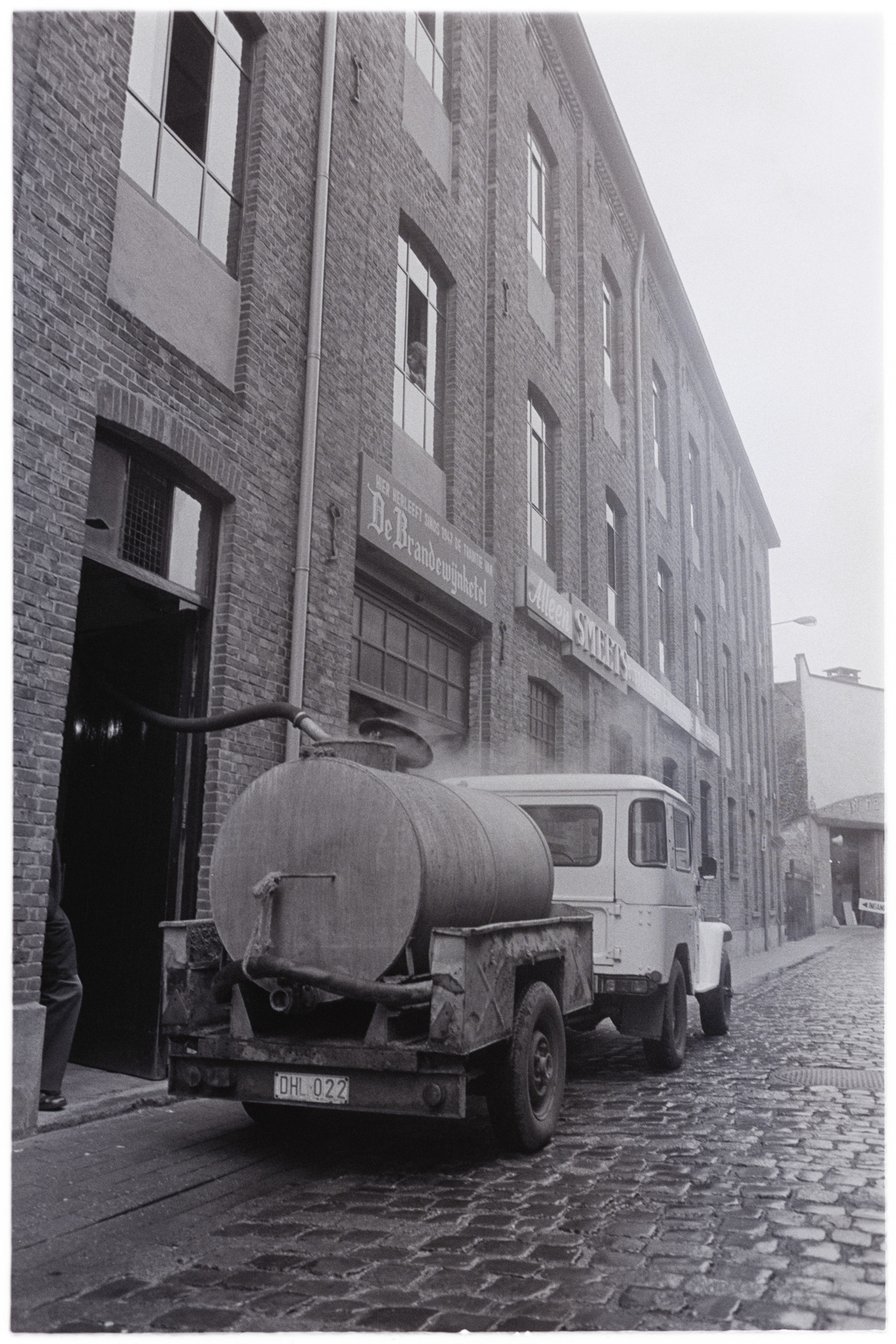

In 2002 Konings Distillery from Zonhoven took over Smeets. In April 2003, Konings moved 75,000 litres of pure, oak-barrelled Smeets to Zonhoven. The company Interbrew set up its commercial depot for Limburg in the buildings on Sasstraat. In 2011, the Ghent-based Bruggeman Distillery took over the Smeets brand. It is now thus a part of the French group La Martiniquaise Benelux.

== Building ==
In the 18th century, when the Elsrack family from Hasselt already ran a distillery there, the building at 17 Raamstraat was called Brandewijnketel (+/- Brandy Kettle. By the mid-19th century that building had fallen into disuse and had not been used as a distillery for quite some time. Later it became a malt house under the name Brepoels-Schoofs.

Stoker Vinckenbosch took over the building and, via the Brepoels family, Smeets jenever distillery became the owner in 1943. In the 1970s, Smeets still regularly heated the installation. In 2002, when Konings took over Smeets, the building was closed and sold. The complex was a fine example of 19th-century functional business architecture.

In 1980, the building was given protected monument status. In 2013, the former distillery building was restored and repurposed as a shopping complex.
