= Charles Verlinden =

Belgian medievalist (1907–1996)

- Born: 3 February 1907; Saint-Gilles, Belgium
- Died: 19 May 1996 (aged 89); Brussels, Belgium
- Education: Ghent University
- Scientific career
- Fields: Medieval history

Charles Verlinden (3 February 1907 – 19 May 1996) was a Belgian medievalist with a particular interest in the history of slavery in Europe. In 1970 he was awarded by the Premio Internazionale Galileo Galilei dei Rotary Italiani for his contribution in Italian history.

== Publications ==
- Les Empereurs Belges de Constantinople (Brussels, Charles Dessart, 1945)
- L'esclavage dans l'Europe médiévale (2 volumes, Bruges, 1955; Ghent, 1977)
