= Katharine Kimball =

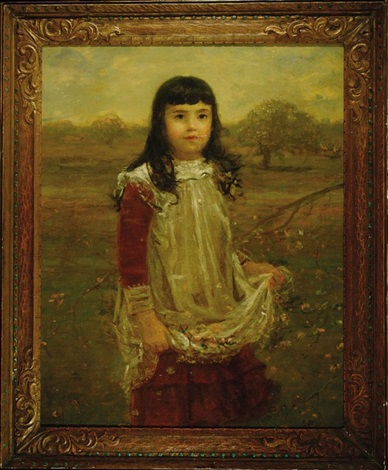
- childhood portrait by George Fuller
- Born: Katharine Lyman Kimball; 17 April 1866; Fitzwilliam, New Hampshire, United States
- Died: 19 March 1949 (aged 82); Bath, England
- Education: National Academy of Design, Royal College of Art
- Known for: Etcher and author

Katharine Kimball A.B.E. (17 April 1866 – 19 March 1949) was an American artist, illustrator, and etcher, who spent most of her later life in England. She is best known for her drawings and etchings of urban and rural landscapes in England and Europe. Many of her images were used to illustrate history and travel publications, such as Paris and Its Story, by T. Okey, and The Story of Canterbury, by G.R. Stirling Taylor.

== Biography ==
Katharine Lyman Kimball was born in Fitzwilliam, New Hampshire the daughter of John Richardson Kimball and Catharine Otis Fulham. As a child Kimball's portrait was painted by George Fuller. Kimball spent some time in Cook County, Illinois and Boston, Massachusetts before studying at the National Academy of Design in New York under her cousin William J. Whittemore and then under Frank Short at the Royal College of Art in London. Her first solo exhibition was "A Catalogue of original pen and ink drawings of known and unknown places of interest by Katharine Kimball" in London at the Clifford Gallery in 1902. In 1909 she was elected an associate member of the Royal Society of Painter-Etchers and Engravers. She lived in Bath from 1915 until her death. Near the end of her life made substantial gifts to the Victoria Art Gallery of works on paper from her own collection. She died at St. James's Square Nursing Home in Bath in 1949 after a short illness.

Kimball donated works to the collections of a number of public art institutions, including: in 1909 and 1911 the Victoria and Albert Museum in London, the Smithsonian American Art Museum, the Portland Art Museum, the Santa Barbara Museum of Art, the Museum of Fine Arts Boston, the Whitney Museum of American Art, in 1923 to the British Museum and in 1937 9 etchings to The Philadelphia Museum of Art. She was a member of the Daughters of the American Revolution and she and her sister donated a number of objects to their museum.

== Career ==
Exhibitions
Year	City	Institution or gallery
1902	London	Messrs. Clifford & Co.
1906	London	Ryder Gallery
1907	London	Royal Academy cat. no. 1370
1909	London	Royal Academy cat. no. 1318
1910	Paris	American Women's Art Association
1910	London	Royal Academy cat. nos. 1297, 1309
1911	London	Royal Academy cat. no. 1400
1911	Paris	Salon d'Automne
1911	New York City	Katz Gallery
1912	London	Royal Academy cat. no. 1523
1913	London	Royal Academy cat. no. 1475
1913	Chicago, IL	Rouiller's Exhibitions
1913	Chicago, IL	Chicago Society of Etchers
1914	London	Royal Academy cat. no. 1133
1915	London	Royal Academy cat. no. 310
1915	Los Angeles, CA	Exposition Park
1916	London	Royal Society of Painter-Etchers
1917	London	Royal Academy cat. no. 406
1919	London	Royal Academy cat. nos. 1202, 1280, 1283
1931	Bath	Victoria Art Gallery

== Bibliography ==
Kimball was the author or illustrator of several books:

- Henry B. Wheatley, The Story of London, (London, 1904)
- T. Okey, Paris and its Story, (London, J.M. Dent, 1904)
- Ernest Gilliat-Smith, The Story of Bruxelles, (London, J.M. Dent, 1906).
- H. MacNaughton-Jones, The Thames, (London, Kegan Paul, 1908)
- Katharine Kimball, Rochester. A Sketchbook, (London, A. & C. Black, 1912)
- G. R. Stirling Taylor, The Story of Canterbury, (London, J.M. Dent, 1912)
