= Ernest Gilliat-Smith =

English writer (1858–1935)

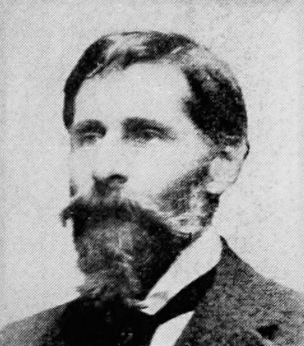
- Gilliat-Smith in 1917
- Born: Frederick Ernest Gilliat-Smith; 8 July 1858; Woodmansterne, England
- Died: 22 February 1935 (aged 76); Newbury, England
- Occupation: Writer
- Spouse: Elinor Cockerell
- Children: 3

Frederick Ernest Gilliat-Smith (July 8, 1858 – February 22, 1935) was an English Catholic poet and author of historical non-fiction.

== Life ==
Gilliat-Smith was born in Woodmansterne, Surrey, on 8 July 1858. He converted to Catholicism in 1879 and pursued a literary career. He married Elinor Cockerell, with whom he had three children, Bernard, Guy and Monica. After living some years in Bruges, Belgium, he moved to Rome in 1913. He died at home in Newbury, Berkshire, on 22 February 1935.

== Publications ==
Gilliat-Smith was a contributor to the Dublin Review, The Tablet, the American Ecclesiastical Review, the Irish Ecclesiastical Record, Catholic World, and the Catholic Encyclopedia. His independent publications include:

- Songs from Prudentius (London, John Lane, 1898)
- Fantasies from Dreamland, illustrated by Flori van Acker (London, 1899)
- Story of Bruges, illustrated by Edith Calvert and Herbert Railton (London, J.M. Dent, 1901).
- Story of Brussels, illustrated by Katharine Kimball and Guy Gilliat-Smith (London, J.M. Dent, 1906).
- St. Clare of Assisi (London, J.M. Dent, 1914).
- Some Notes, Historical and Otherwise, concerning the Sacred Constantinian Order (London, J.M. Dent, 1922).
- Saint Anthony of Padua according to his contemporaries (London & Toronto, J.M. Dent; New York, E.P. Dutton, 1926).
