= Hippolyte Fierens-Gevaert =

Belgian art historian, philosopher, art critic, singer, and writer (1870-1926)

Hippolyte Gevaert or Fierens-Gevaert (1870, Brussels - 1926, Liège) was a Belgian art historian, philosopher, art critic, singer, and writer.

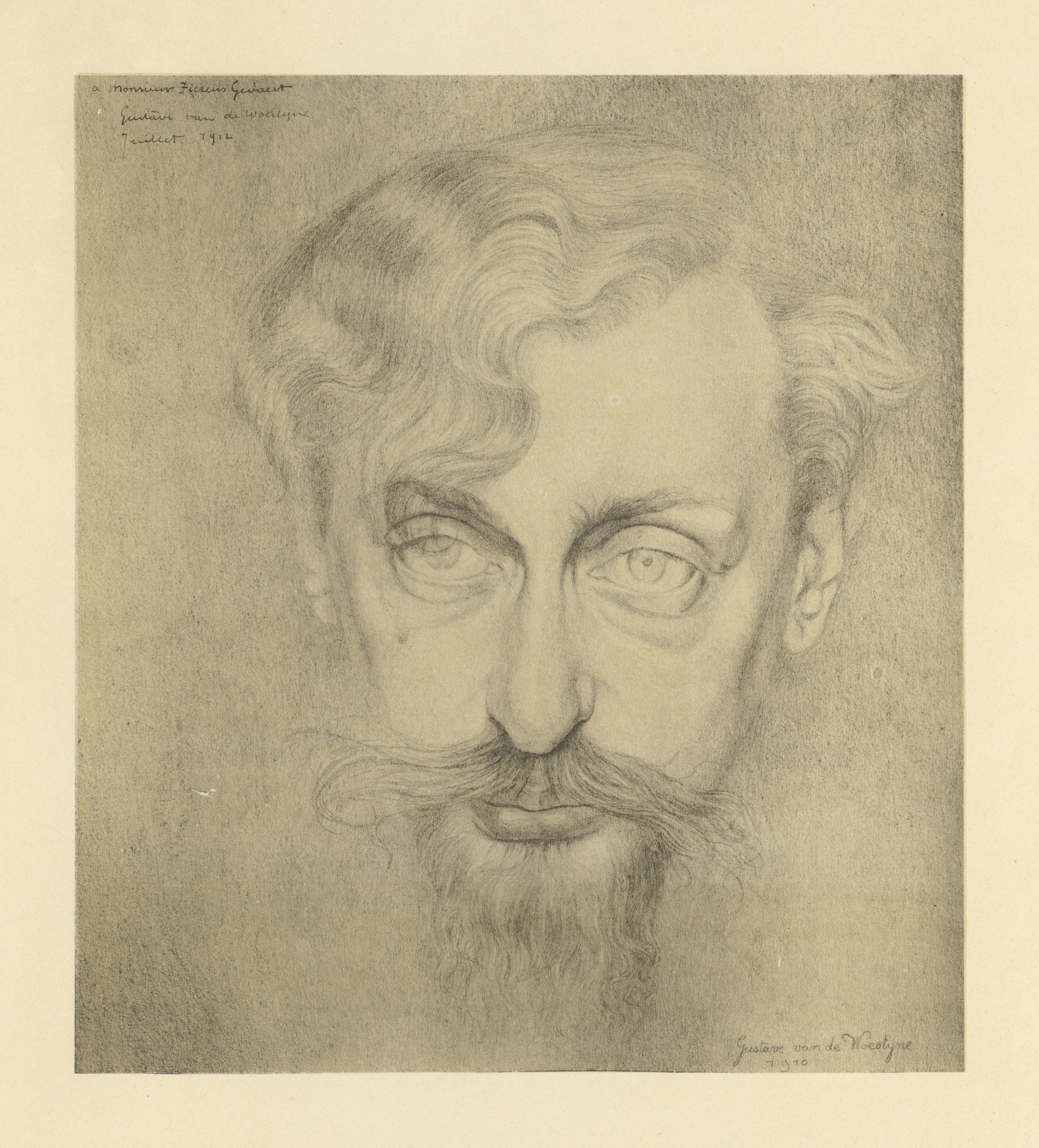
Portrait of Hippolyte Fierens-Gevaert by Gustave van de Woestijne, 1912

== Life ==
He studied from age 17 at the Royal Conservatory of Brussels in 1890 and obtained first prize for singing in 1890. That same year he married Jacqueline Marthe Gevaert, daughter of the then famous musician François-Auguste Gevaert (1828-1908). He then joined the Opéra de Lille, but an accident with his voice ended his singing career. He moved to Paris, where he began working as a journalist, writer and art critic and changed his surname to Fierens-Gevaert.

From 1893 he wrote articles for various magazines, including the Journal des Débats. He further published various essays. In 1902 he returned to Belgium to teach at the University of Liège courses in aesthetics, philosophy of art, art history of the Renaissance and the Modern Era and, from 1906, the history of music.

He later became the first curator of the Royal Museums of Fine Arts of Belgium and was also a professor of aesthetics and art history.

== Works ==
- Essai sur l’art contemporain, Paris : Alcan, 1897
- La tristesse contemporaine, Paris : Alcan, 1899
- Psychologie d’une ville, essai sur Bruges, Paris : Alcan, 1901
- L'Hôtel de ville de Paris, Paris : Librairie de l'art ancien et moderne, 1902
- Van Dyck, Paris : H. Laurens, 1903
- Nouveaux essays sur l’art contemporain, Paris : Alcan, 1903
- Jordaens : biographie critique, Paris : H. Laurens, 1905
- Études sur l'art flamand, La Renaissance septentrionale et les premiers maîtres des Flandres, Brussels : G. van Oest, 1905
- L’Art au XXe siècle et son expression en Belgique, Brussels : Éditions de la Belgique, 1907
- La peinture en Belgique, musées, églises, collections, etc/ Les Primitifs Flamands, 2 vols/, Brussels : G. van Oest, 1908-1909
- La peinture au Musée ancien de Bruxelles, Brussels : G. van Oest, 1913
- L'enseignement de l'histoire de l'art en Belgique, Revue de Synthèse historique 28, 82 (1914) : 82-90,
- Les Très Belles Heures de Jean de France, duc de Berry, Brussels : Weckesser, 1924 [and Fierens, Paul : 3rd vol.]
- Histoire de la peinture flamande des origines à la fin du XVe siècle, 3 vols, Brussels : G. van Oest, 1927-1929
