= Piatus of Mons =

Belgian Catholic theologian

Piatus of Mons, born Jean-Joseph Loiseaux (August 5, 1815–April 21, 1904) was a Belgian Catholic theologian who wrote in Latin and French.

== Biography ==
Loiseaux was born on 5 August 1815. As a student for the priesthood he distinguished himself in moral theology and canon law.

After his ordination as a secular priest of the Diocese of Tournai in Belgium in 1838, he continued his study of canon law at the Catholic University of Leuven. In 1843 he was appointed a vicar of Tournai Cathedral, but the following year he went to Rome, and there spent two years in the Belgian College, studying canon law and working for the congregations. He returned to Belgium in 1846 and the next year was appointed to the chair of canon law and ecclesiastical history at Leuven.

In 1847 in cooperation with Abbé Felise he founded the quarterly magazine Mélanges théologiques and later the Revue théologique and the Nouvelle revue théologique. The first was concerned chiefly with canon law; the second with liturgy. He continued to edit the Nouvelle revue théologique until 1895, when it passed into the hands of the Redemptorists.

He twice refused the Bishopric of Tournai. In 1871 he entered the Order of Capuchin Friars Minor.

He died 21 April 1904 in the monastery of St Claire at Bruges.

== Writings ==
His chief works are

- Praelectiones juris regularis, a dissertation
- De sentia S. Bonaventurae circa essentiam sacramenti Poenitentiae
- Traité du jubilé.

He also wrote a great number of articles in theological reviews.

== Bibliography ==
- Analecta Ord. FF. Min. Capp. (Rome, July, 1904)
- Etudes franciscaines (Louvain, May, July, and August 1912).
