= Joseph Van den Gheyn =

Belgian Jesuit, Bollandist and chief conservator of the Royal Library of Belgium

Joseph Van den Gheyn SJ
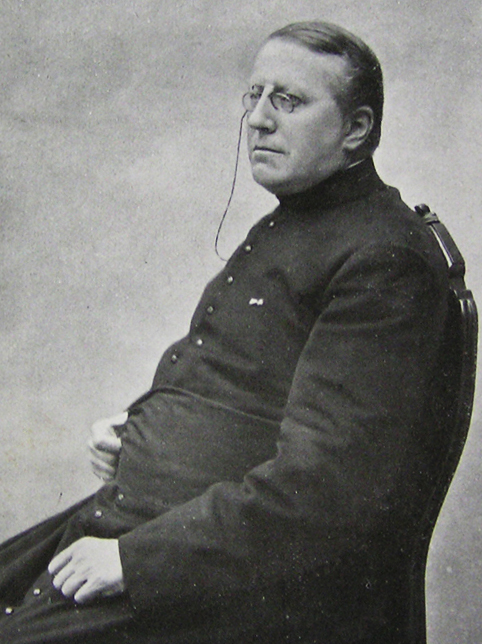
- Van den Gheyn in 1912
- Church: Catholic Church

Orders
- Ordination: 1886

Personal details
- Born: 24 May 1854 Ghent, Belgium
- Died: 29 January 1913 (aged 58) Brussels, Belgium
- Education: Sint-Barbaracollege

Joseph Marie Martin Van den Gheyn SJ (24 May 1854 – 29 January 1913) was a Belgian Jesuit, Bollandist, and chief conservator of the Royal Library of Belgium.

== Life ==
Van den Gheyn was born in Ghent on 24 May 1854, the son of Edouard Van den Gheyn, a professor of chemistry at Ghent University. He was educated at St Barbara's College in Ghent and entered the Jesuit noviciate in Drongen on 27 September 1871. He developed a wide range of intellectual interests and published articles in numerous fields relating to language and culture. He was ordained to the priesthood in 1886. His brother was Canon Gabriel Van den Gheyn, guardian of the treasury of St Bavo's Cathedral, Ghent, who hid the central panels of the Ghent Altarpiece during the First World War.

Joseph was assigned to the Bollandists in 1888, to research Greek and Eastern saints, and taught a course on Sanskrit at the Institut Catholique de Paris. In 1896 he was appointed conservator of manuscripts in the Royal Library of Belgium. He continued to contribute to the work of the Bollandists until 1905. As conservator he systematically catalogued and considerably expanded the Royal Library's manuscript holdings. He was involved in organising the Exposition des primitifs flamands à Bruges, and published editions of several medieval illuminated manuscripts, including Le Bréviaire de Philippe le Bon (1909), Jean le Tavernier's Cronicques et conquestes de Charlemaine (1909), Loyset Liédet's Histoire de Charles Martel (1910), and two books of hours attributed to Jacques Coene (1911). In 1909 he was appointed chief conservator.

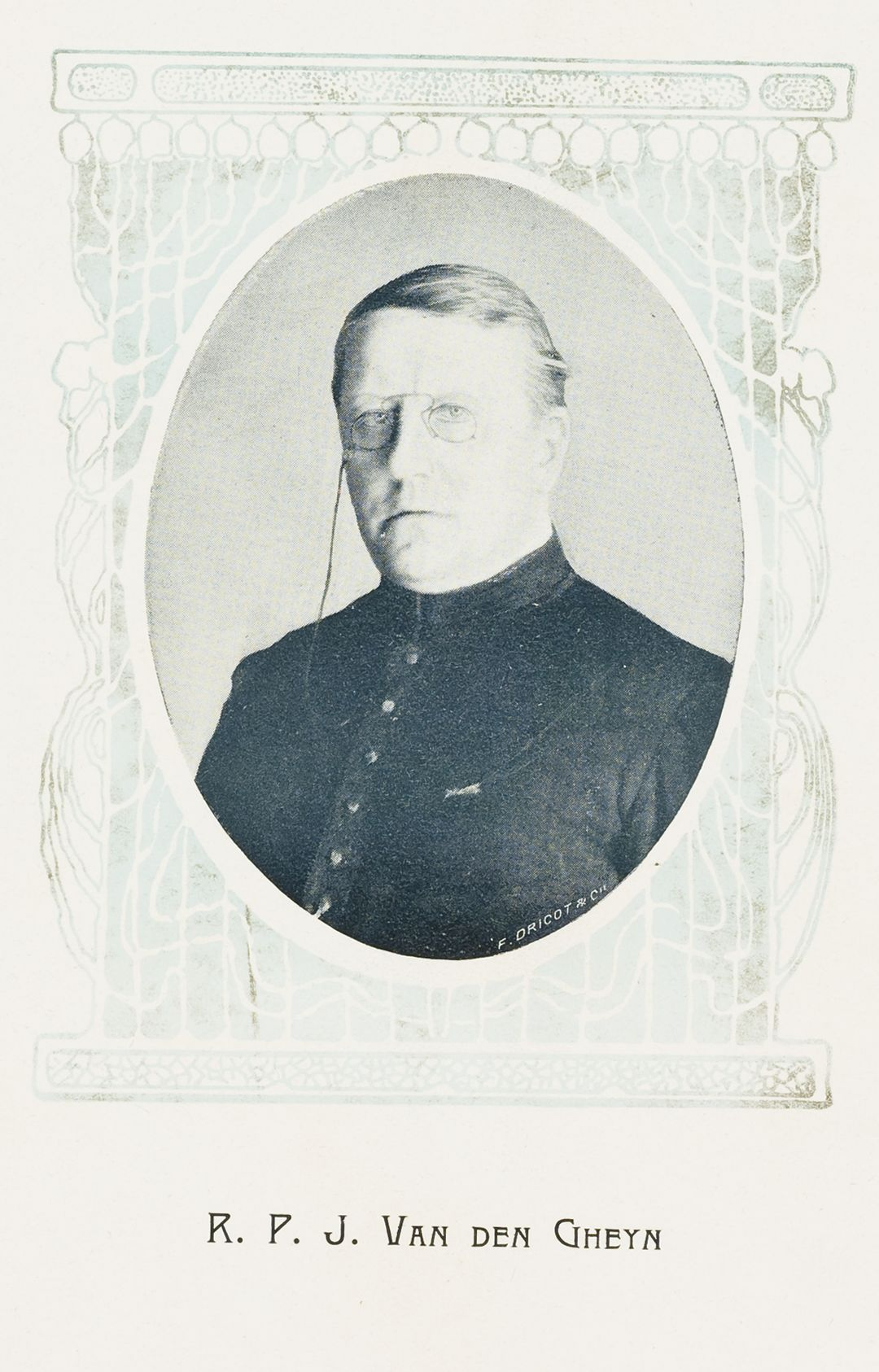
R. P. Joseph Van den Gheyn

Van den Gheyn received an honorary doctorate from the Catholic University of Leuven in 1911. He died in Brussels on 29 January 1913, a few weeks after retiring.

== Publications ==
- Cerbère: étude de mythologie comparée (1881)
- Essais de mythologie et de philologie comparée (1885)
- Catalogue des manuscrits de la Bibliothèque royale de Belgique, vols. 1–9 (Brussels, 1901–1909).
- La préhistoire en Belgique (1830-1905) (1905)
