= Edmond Deman =

Belgian author (1857–1918)

Edmond Deman (1857–1918) was a publisher, antiquarian bookseller and prints dealer in fin-de-siècle Brussels.

== Life ==
Deman was born in Brussels on 26 March 1857. He studied at the Catholic University of Leuven, where he became friends with Émile Verhaeren and edited a student newspaper together with members of the circle that went on to found La Jeune Belgique. In 1880 he married Constance Horwath and together they set up as antiquarian bookdealers in Brussels.

From 1888 onwards, Deman used a logo designed for him by Fernand Khnopff in his catalogues. He also published a relatively small number of bibliophile editions, mainly of leading poets with illustrations by leading artists, particularly Émile Verhaeren and Théo van Rysselberghe. During the First World War he took refuge in his holiday home at Le Lavandou. He died there on 19 February 1918.

== Publications ==
Émile Verhaeren, Les Campagnes hallucinées, 1893

1888

- Émile Verhaeren, Les Soirs, with a frontispiece by Odilon Redon and four vignettes by Fernand Khnopff, printed by Veuve Monnom
- Edgar Allan Poe, Poèmes, translated by Stephane Mallarmé
- Émile Verhaeren, Les Débâcles

1890

- Iwan Gilkin, La Damnation de l'artiste

1891

- Jules Destrée, L'Œuvre lithographique de Odilon Redon
- Stephane Mallarmé, Pages
- Émile Verhaeren, Les Flambeaux noirs

1892

- Iwan Gilkin, Ténèbres

1893

- Émile Verhaeren, Les Campagnes hallucinées

1894

- Maurice Maeterlinck, Alladine et Palomides, Interieur, et La mort de Tintagiles: trois petits drames pour marionnettes

1895

- Émile Verhaeren, Les Villes tentaculaires

1896

- Émile Verhaeren, Les Heures claires

1897

- Gustave Kahn, Limbes de lumières, illustrated by Georges Lemmen
- Camille Lemonnier, Alphonse Wauters, and Armand Heins, Le Palais de la ville de Bruxelles à l'Exposition universelle de 1897

1898

- Léon Bloy, Mendiant ingrat
- Émile Verhaeren, Les Aubes

1899

- Stephane Mallarmé, Poésies
- Émile Verhaeren, Les Visages de la vie
- Villiers de l'Isle-Adam, Histoires souveraines, with ornaments by Théo van Rysselberghe

1900

- Émile Verhaeren, Le Cloître
- Émile Verhaeren, Petites Légendes

1901

- Eugène Demolder, Constantin Meunier
- Eugène Demolder, Trois contemporains: Henri de Brakeleer, Constantin Meunier, Félicien Rops

1904

- Émile Verhaeren, Les Tendresses premières, illustrated by Théo van Rysselberghe

1905

- Émile Verhaeren, Les Heures d'après-midi

1907

- Jules Barbey d'Aurevilly, Le Rideau cramoisi, illustrated by Armand Rassenfosse

1908

- Fernand Crommelynck, Le Sculpteur de masques

1912

- Thomas Braun, Fumée d'Ardenne, with a cover by Georges Lemmen
