= Fernand Khnopff =

Belgian painter (1858–1921)

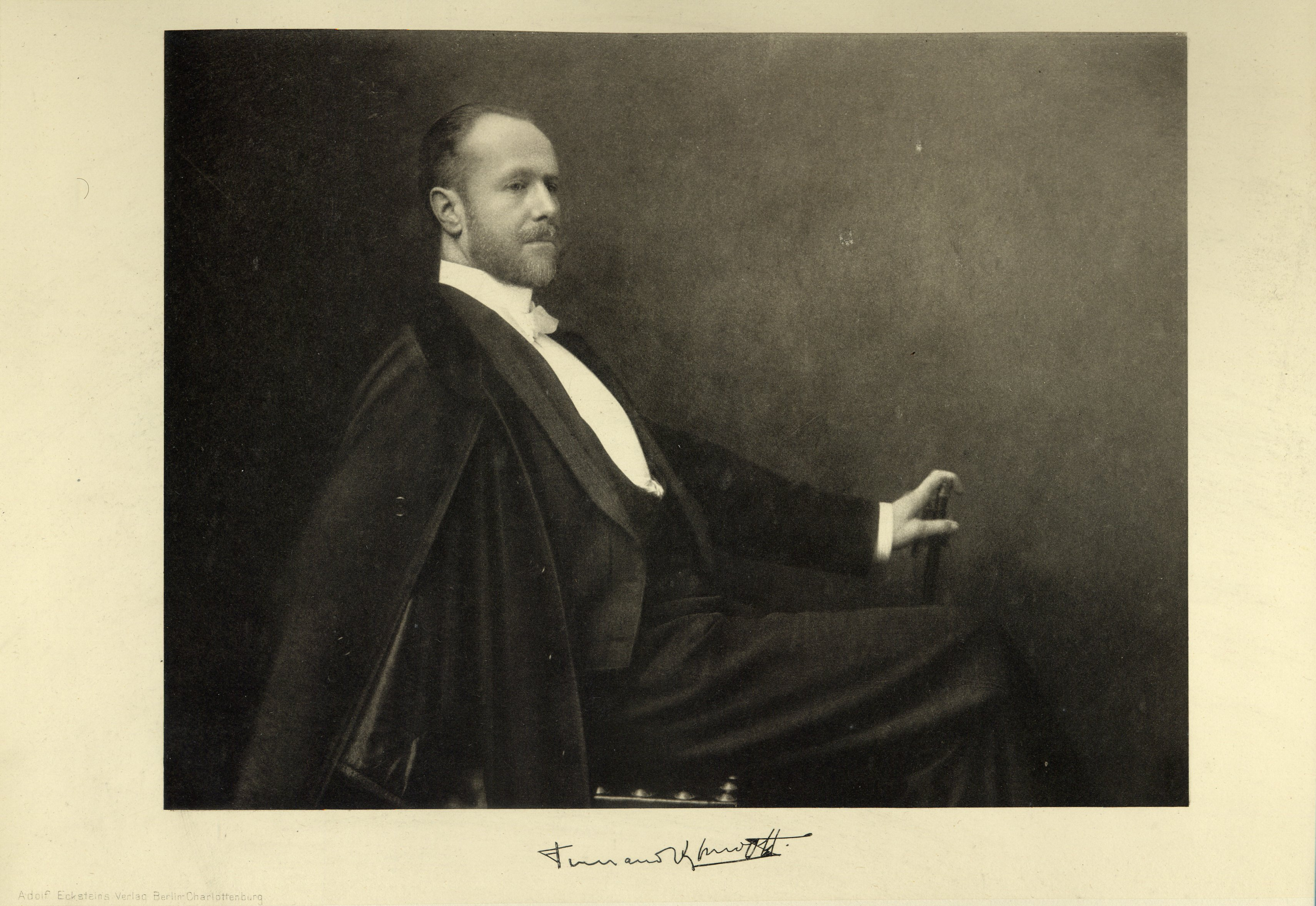
- Fernand Khnopff (c. 1900)
- Born: Fernand Edmond Jean Marie Khnopff; 12 September 1858; Grembergen, Belgium
- Died: 12 November 1921 (aged 63); Brussels, Belgium
- Education: Xavier Mellery; Académie Royal des Beaux-Arts, Brussels; Académie Julian, Paris
- Known for: Painter, sculptor, designer
- Notable work: Caress of the Sphinx
- Movement: Symbolism
- Awards: Commander in the Order of Leopold; Officer of the Légion d'Honneur

Fernand Edmond Jean Marie Khnopff (12 September 1858 – 12 November 1921) was a Belgian symbolist painter and one of the founding members of the avant-garde group Les XX in 1883. His paintings often depict isolation, desire, and the dual image of woman as femme fatale and angelic ideal, a recurring theme in symbolist art. His sister Marguerite was a frequent subject, appearing in numerous portraits throughout his career.

Khnopff had close ties to British Pre-Raphaelitism, befriending Edward Burne-Jones and other British artists, and from 1895 was Brussels correspondent for the art journal The Studio. His work, particularly Caress of the Sphinx (1896), influenced the Vienna Secession and Gustav Klimt after Khnopff exhibited 21 works at the Secession's first exhibition in 1898.

Khnopff also designed theater sets and opera costumes, working with director Max Reinhardt and on productions at Brussels' Théâtre Royal de la Monnaie. From 1900, he designed a home and studio in Brussels around his motto "On a que soi" (One has but oneself); the house, inspired by the Vienna Secession, with a golden circle inscribed on the white mosaic floor of the studio, was his "Temple of the self" until his death in 1921.

== Life ==
=== Youth and training ===
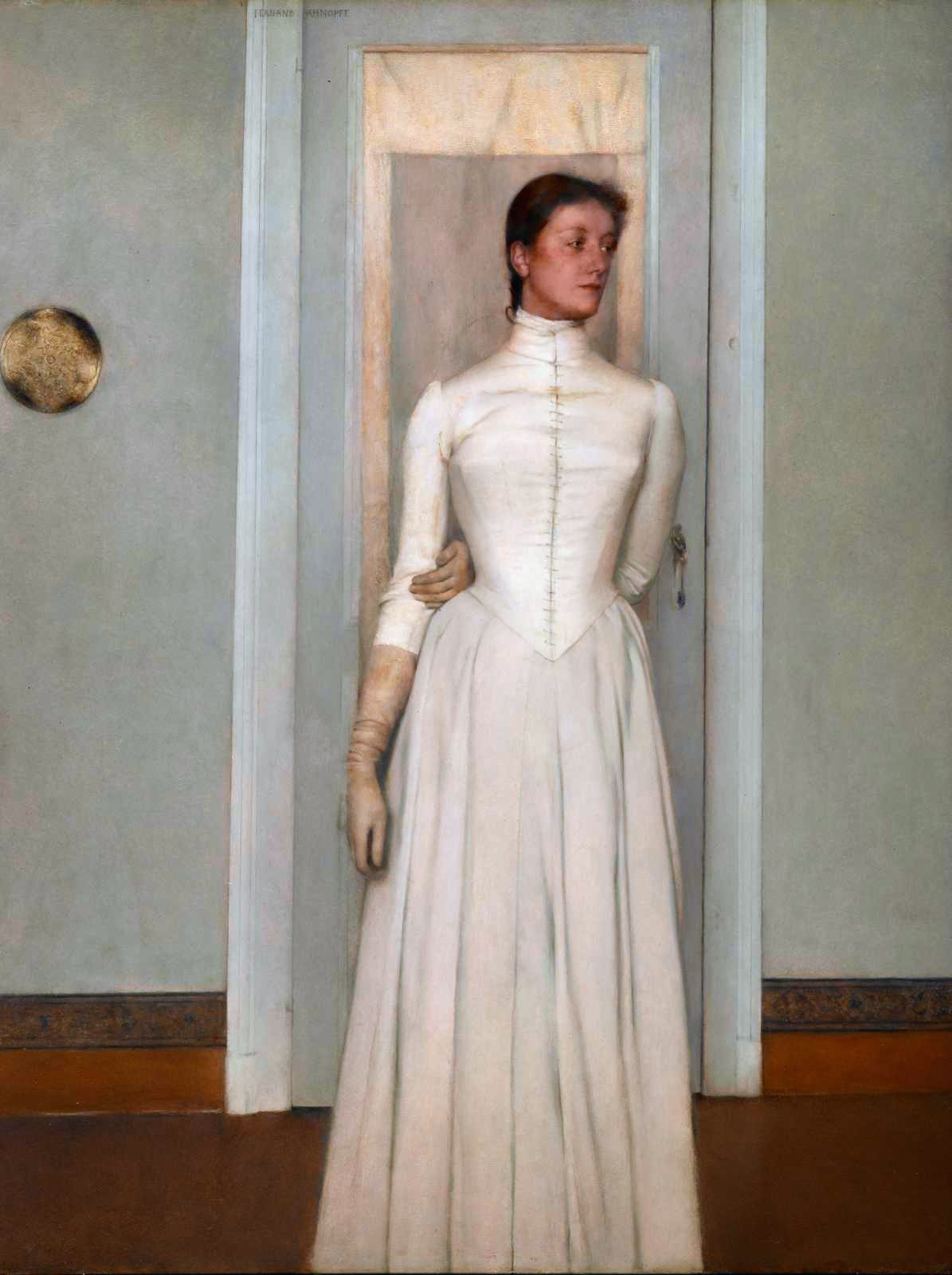
Portrait of Marguerite Khnopff (1887), by Fernand Khnopff

Fernand Khnopff was born to a wealthy family that had been part of the high bourgeoisie for generations. Khnopff's ancestors had lived in the Vossenhoek area of Grembergen, Flanders, since the early 17th century but were of Austrian and Portuguese descent. Most male members of his family had been lawyers or judges, and young Fernand was destined for a juridical career. In his early childhood (1859–1864), he lived in Bruges, where his father was appointed substitut du procureur du roi (deputy public prosecutor). His childhood memories of the medieval city of Bruges would play a significant role in his later work. In 1864, the family moved to Brussels. In his childhood Khnopff spent part of his summer holidays in the hamlet of Tillet, (Note: As of 1977, Tillet is part of the Sainte-Ode commune.) not far from Bastogne in the Luxemburg province, where his maternal grandparents owned an estate. He painted several views of this village.

To please his parents, he went to law school at the Free University of Brussels (now divided into the Université Libre de Bruxelles and the Vrije Universiteit Brussel) when he was 18 years old. During this period, he developed a passion for literature, discovering the works of Baudelaire, Flaubert, Leconte de Lisle and other mostly French authors. With his younger brother Georges Khnopff – also a passionate amateur of contemporary music and poetry – he started to frequent Jeune Belgique ("Young Belgium"), a group of young writers including Max Waller, Georges Rodenbach, Iwan Gilkin, and Emile Verhaeren.

Khnopff left university for lack of interest in his law studies and began to frequent the studio of Xavier Mellery, who introduced him to painting. On 25 October 1876, he enrolled in the cours de dessin après nature ("course of drawing after nature") at the Académie Royale des Beaux-Arts. At the Académie, his most famous fellow student was James Ensor, whom he disliked from the start. Between 1877 and 1880, Khnopff made several trips to Paris, where he discovered the work of Delacroix, Ingres, Moreau and Stevens. At the Paris World Fair of 1878 he became acquainted with the work of Millais and Burne-Jones. During his last year at the Académie in 1878–1879 he neglected his classes in Brussels and lived for a while in Passy, where he attended the open courses of Jules Joseph Lefebvre at the Académie Julian.

=== Early career with Les XX ===
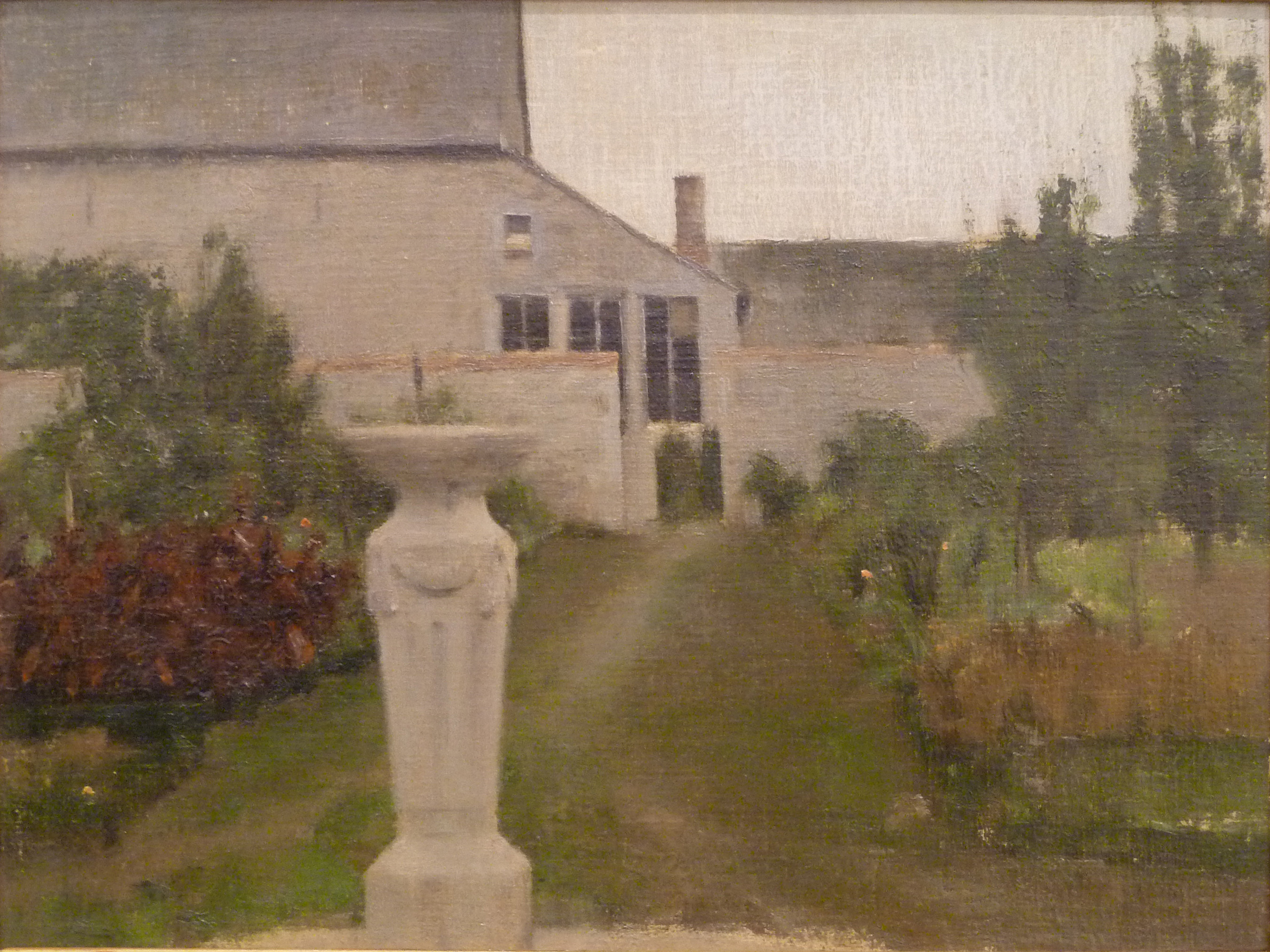
The Garden (1886)

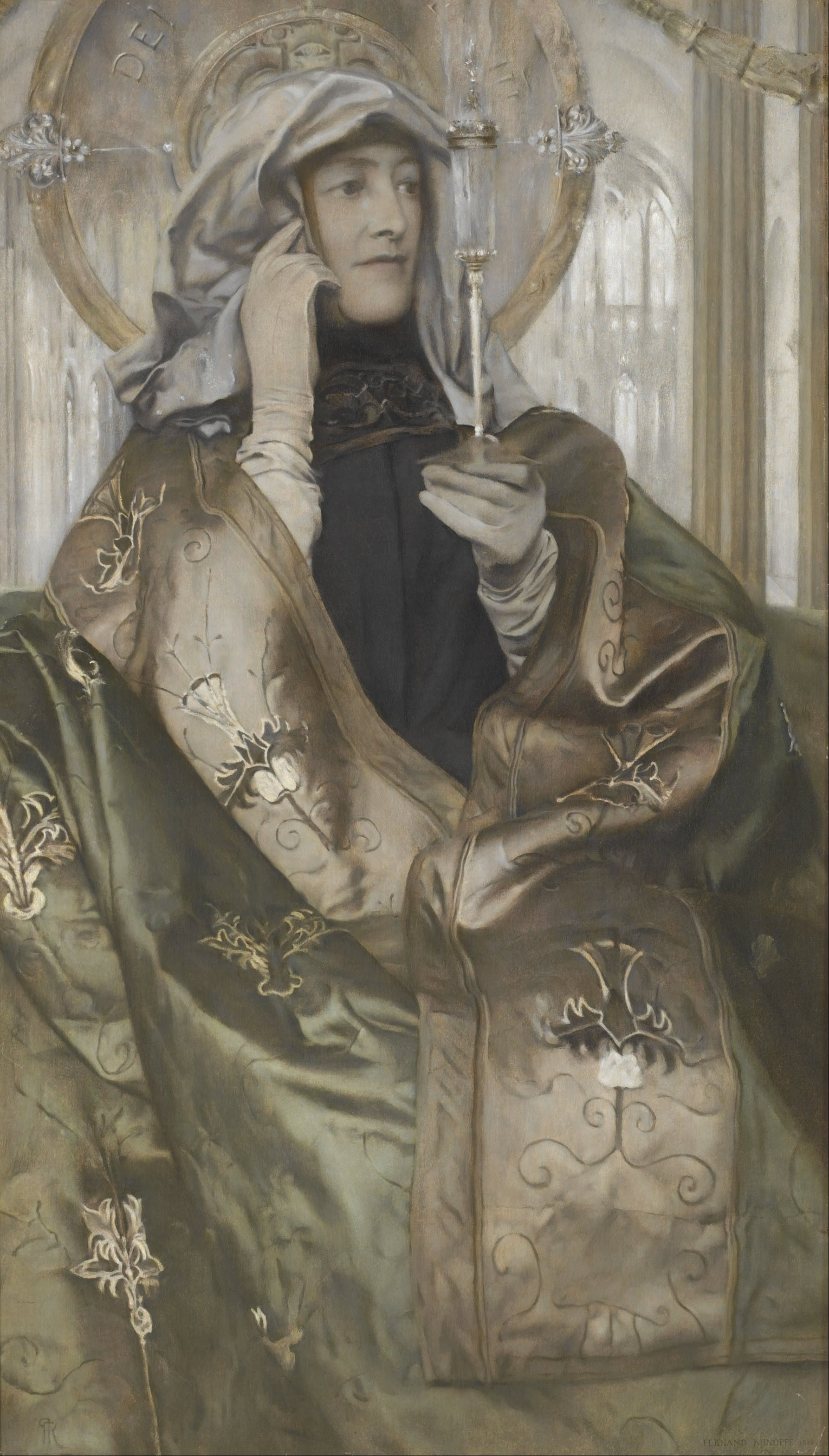
Incense by Fernand Khnopff

In 1881, he presented his works to the public for the first time at the "Salon de l'Essor" in Brussels. The critics' appraisal of his work was very harsh, with the exception of Emile Verhaeren, who wrote a commending review. Verhaeren would remain a lifelong supporter and would write the first monograph on the painter. In 1883, Khnopff was one of the founding members of the group Le Groupe des XX. Khnopff exhibited regularly at the annual "Salon" organised by Les XX.

In 1885, he met the French writer Joséphin Péladan, the future grandmaster of the Rosicrucian "Ordre de la Rose + Croix". Péladan asked Khnopff to design the cover for his new novel Le Vice suprême. Khnopff accepted this commission but destroyed the work later because the famous soprano Rose Caron was offended by the imaginary portrait of Leonora d'Este (a character in Péladan's Le Vice suprême) that Khnopff had designed to adorn the cover, in which Caron thought she recognised her own face. The vehement reaction of "La Caron" caused a scandal in the Belgian and Parisian press and helped to establish Khnopff's name as an artist. Khnopff continued to design illustrations for the works of Péladan, most notably for Femmes honnêtes (1888) and Le Panthée (1892). On several occasions (1892, 1893, 1894 and 1897) Khnopff was invited as guest of honour at the exhibitions of the Parisian "Salon de la Rose + Croix" organised by Péladan.

=== Later years ===
In 1889, Khnopff made his first contacts with England, where he would stay and exhibit regularly in the future. British artists such as Hunt, Watts, Rossetti, Brown and Burne-Jones became friends. From 1895 Khnopff worked as a correspondent for the British art journal The Studio. Until the outbreak of World War I in 1914, Khnopff was responsible for the column "Studio-Talks-Brussels", in which he reported on artistic developments in Belgium and continental Europe. In March 1898 Khnopff presented a selection of 21 works at the first exhibition of the Vienna Secession. In Vienna his work was received with great admiration. The works he presented at the Secession were a major influence on the work of Gustav Klimt.

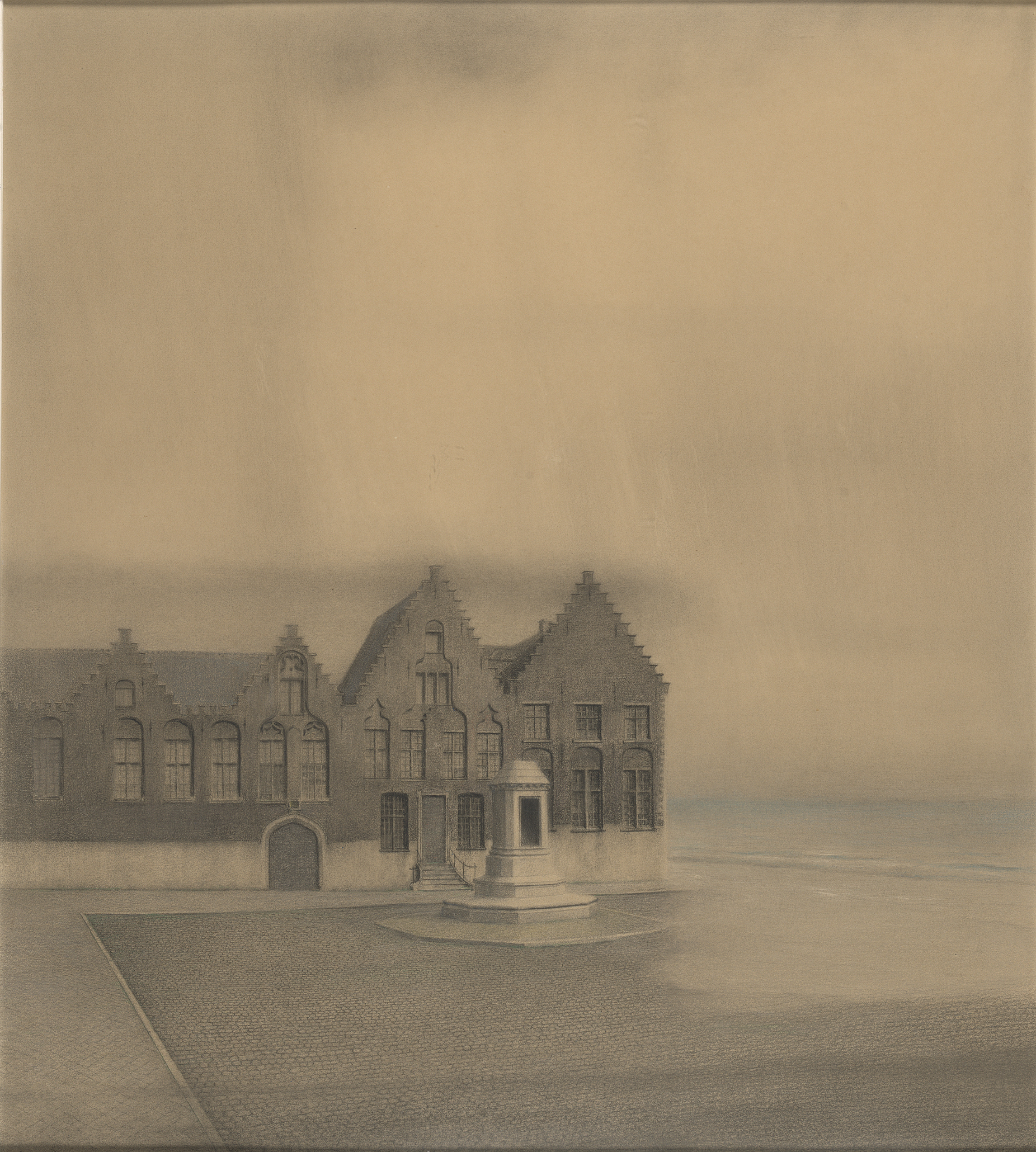
The Abandoned City, a symbolist drawing by Fernand Khnopff, was inspired by the landscape of Woensdagmarkt square in Bruges.

From 1900 onwards, Khnopff was engaged in the design of his new home and studio in Brussels (demolished). The house, which he shared with his sister Marguerite, was inspired by the Vienna Secession, in particular the architecture of Joseph Maria Olbrich. To the sober architecture and decoration Khnopff added a highly symbolic, spatial and decorative concept that turned his home into a "Temple of the self". The house functioned as a shrine in which the genius of the painter could flourish. His motto "On a que soi" (One has but oneself) was inscribed above the entrance door, and in his studio he painted in the middle of a golden circle inscribed on the white mosaic floor. (Note: A description and photographs of the house and its interiors were published in The Studio in 1912.) This almost theatrical setting reflected Khnopff's passion for theatre and opera. Khnopff's first designs for the theatre date from 1903, when he sketched the sets for a production of Georges Rodenbach's play Le Mirage at the Deutsches Theater Berlin. This production was directed by Max Reinhardt, and the sets, evoking the gloomy streets of the mysterious city of Bruges where Khnopff had spent his early childhood, were much appreciated by the Berlin public and critics. After Khnopff was engaged to design the costumes and sets for the world premiere of Ernest Chausson's opera Le Roi Arthus at the Théâtre Royal de la Monnaie in Brussels in 1903, he collaborated on more than a dozen opera productions given at "La Monnaie" in the following decade. In 1904 the city council of Saint-Gilles commissioned him to decorate the ceilings of the "Salle des Marriages" (Wedding Room) of the new Municipal Hall, and in the same year he was approached by the banker Adolphe Stoclet to design decorative panels for the music room of the Stoclet Palace. Here Khnopff again came into contact with prominent artists from the Vienna Secession: the architect of the Stoclet Palace, Josef Hoffmann, and Gustav Klimt, who had designed a decorative mosaic for its dining room.

Although reserved and secluded by nature, Khnopff achieved cult status during his lifetime. He received the Order of Leopold. His most famous painting is probably Caress of the Sphinx ("L'Art ou Des Caresses").

Khnopff is buried in Laeken Cemetery.

== Honours and legacy ==
- 1919: Commander of the Order of Leopold. (Note: Royal Decree of H.M. King Albert I on 14 November 1919.)
- Member of the Royal Academy of Science, Letters and Fine Arts of Belgium.
- A street in Grembergen, Belgium, is named after him: "Fernand Khnopffstraat".
- In 2021, rapper Bladee used a Khnopff painting as his Twitter avatar.

== Works in public collections ==
The catalogue numbers (dCOZ) refer to Catherine de Croës and Gisèle Ollinger-Zinque's 1987 catalogue raisonné.

Location	Title	Original title	Date	dCOZ
Amsterdam, Van Gogh Museum	Portrait of the Violinist Achille Lerminiaux		1885	75
Antwerp, Koninklijk Museum voor Schone Kunsten	Portrait of Edmond Khnopff, Father of the Painter		1881	33
Bruges, Groeningemuseum	Secret-Reflection	Secret-Reflect	1902	378
Brussels, Royal Museums of Fine Arts of Belgium	Listening to Schumann	En écoutant Schumann	1883	52
Brussels, Royal Museums of Fine Arts of Belgium	Portrait of Marguerite Khnopff, Sister of the Painter	Portrait of Marguerite Khnopff	1887	100
Brussels, Royal Museums of Fine Arts of Belgium	Silence	Du silence	1890	151
Brussels, Royal Museums of Fine Arts of Belgium	In Fosset, Under the Firs	À Fosset, sous les sapins	1894	242
Brussels, Royal Museums of Fine Arts of Belgium	Caress of the Sphinx		1896	275
Brussels, Royal Museums of Fine Arts of Belgium	Memories or Lawn Tennis		1889	131
Brussels, Royal Museums of Fine Arts of Belgium	Posthumous Portrait of Marguerite Landuyt		1896	280
Brussels, Royal Museums of Fine Arts of Belgium	Portrait of His Royal Highness Prince Leopold of Belgium		1912	499
Brussels, Royal Museums of Fine Arts of Belgium	Portrait of Miss Van der Hecht		1883	57
Brussels, Royal Museums of Fine Arts of Belgium	Portrait of Germaine Wiener		1893	237
Brussels, Royal Museums of Fine Arts of Belgium	White, Black and Gold	Blanc, noir et or	1901	365
Brussels, Royal Museums of Fine Arts of Belgium	A Mask of a Young English Woman	Un masque de jeune femme anglaise	1891	181
Brussels, Royal Museums of Fine Arts of Belgium	Bust in polychromed plaster			
Brussels, Royal Museums of Fine Arts of Belgium	Under the Trees	Sous les arbres	1894	253
Brussels, Royal Museums of Fine Arts of Belgium	An Abandoned City	Une ville abandonnée	1904	401
Brussels, Collection of the BOZAR	Portrait of a Man		c. 1885	89
Budapest, Museum of Fine Arts	In Fosset, A Brook	À Fosset, Un ruisseau	1897	285
Dendermonde, Stedelijke Musea	Landscape at Fosset	Paysage à Fosset	c. 1894	254
Elsene/Ixelles, Musée d'Ixelles/Museum van Elsene	Portrait of Charles Maus (father of Octave Maus, secretary of Les XX)		1885	84
Elsene/Ixelles, Musée d'Ixelles/Museum van Elsene	Chimaera	Chimère	c. 1910	470
Frankfurt-am-Main, Städelsches Kunstinstitut	In Fosset, The Forester Who Waits	À Fosset, Le garde qui attend	1883	49
Ghent, Museum of Fine Arts	Incense	L'Encens	c. 1898	325
Ghent, Museum of Fine Arts	In Fosset, A Track	À Fosset, Un sentier	c. 1890–95	170
Ghent, Museum of Fine Arts	Brown Eyes and a Blue Flower	Des yeux bruns et une fleur bleue	1905	415
Hamburg, Kunsthalle	A Mask (sculpture in polychromed plaster)	Un Masque	1897	299
Liège, Musée d'art moderne et d'art contemporain	Portrait of the Mother of the Artist		1882	39
Liège, Musée d'art moderne et d'art contemporain	Orpheus	Orphée	1913	519
Liège, Musée d'art moderne et d'art contemporain	The Isolation (parts I and III of a triptych: Acrasia, Solitude, and Brittomart) (Note: Part II, Solitude, is held by the Neumann Foundation in Gingins.)	L'Isolement	c. 1890–94	
Liège, Musée d'art moderne et d'art contemporain	Hair	Les cheveux	1892	218bis
Los Angeles, J. Paul Getty Museum	Portrait of Jeanne Kéfer		1885	82
Munich, Bayerische Staatsgemäldesammlungen, Neue Pinakothek	I Lock My Door Upon Myself		1891	174
Neuss, Clemens Sels Museum	In Bruges, A Portal	À Bruges, un portail	c. 1904	405
New York City, Metropolitan Museum of Art	The Offering	L'Offrande	1891	187
Ostend, Museum voor Schone Kunsten	View from the Bridge at Fosset		c. 1882–83	41bis
Paris, Musée d'Orsay	Portrait of Marie Monnom (later wife of Théo van Rysselberghe)		1887	98
Verviers, Musées Communaux	In Bruges, A Church	À Bruges, une église	1904	393
Vienna, Österreichische Galerie Belvedere	The Immobile Water	L'Eau immobile	c. 1894	247
Vienna, Graphische Sammlung Albertina	Head of a Young English Woman (drawing in red chalk)	Tête de jeune femme anglaise	1895	265

== Gallery ==
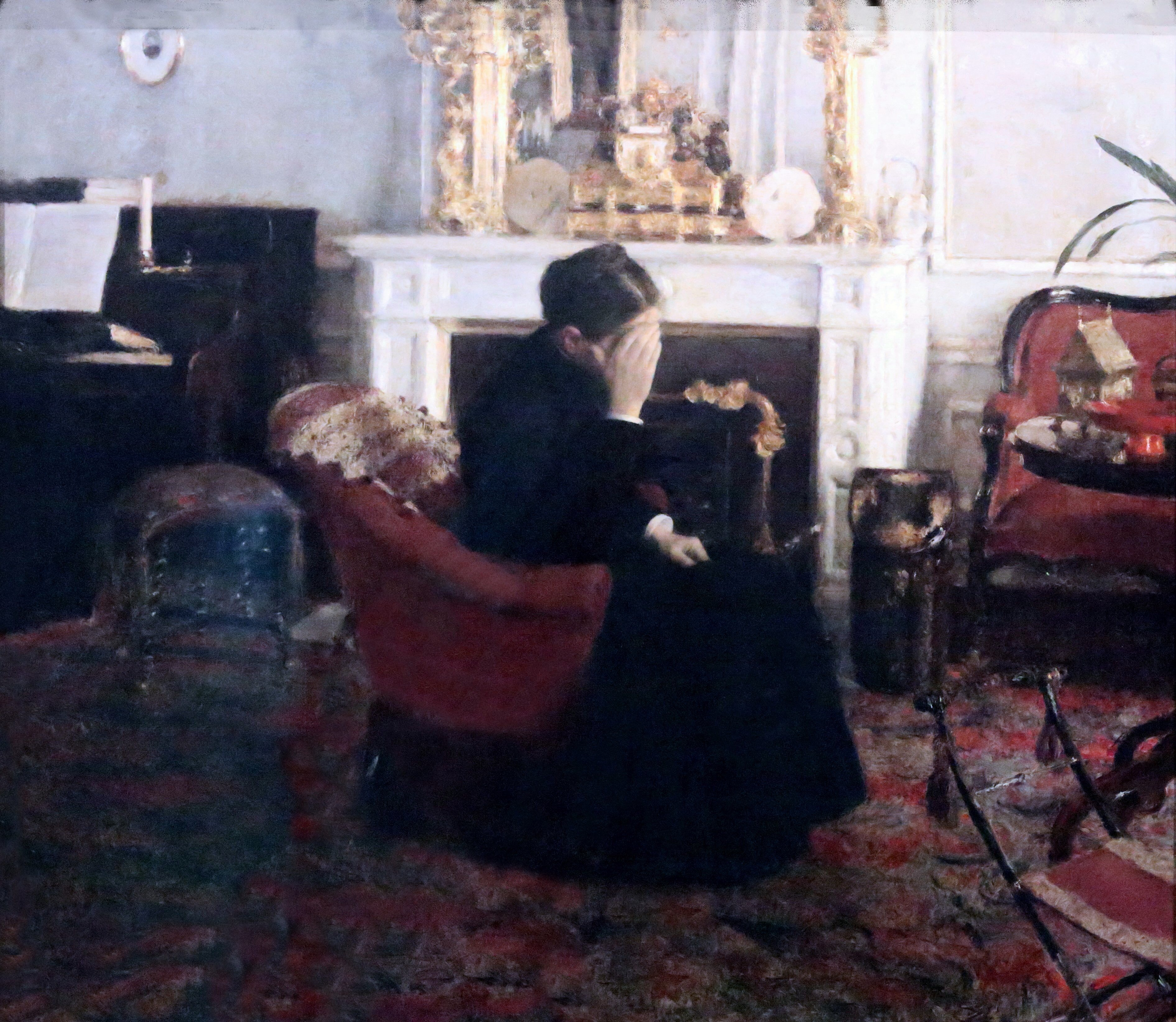
Listening to Schumann, 1883

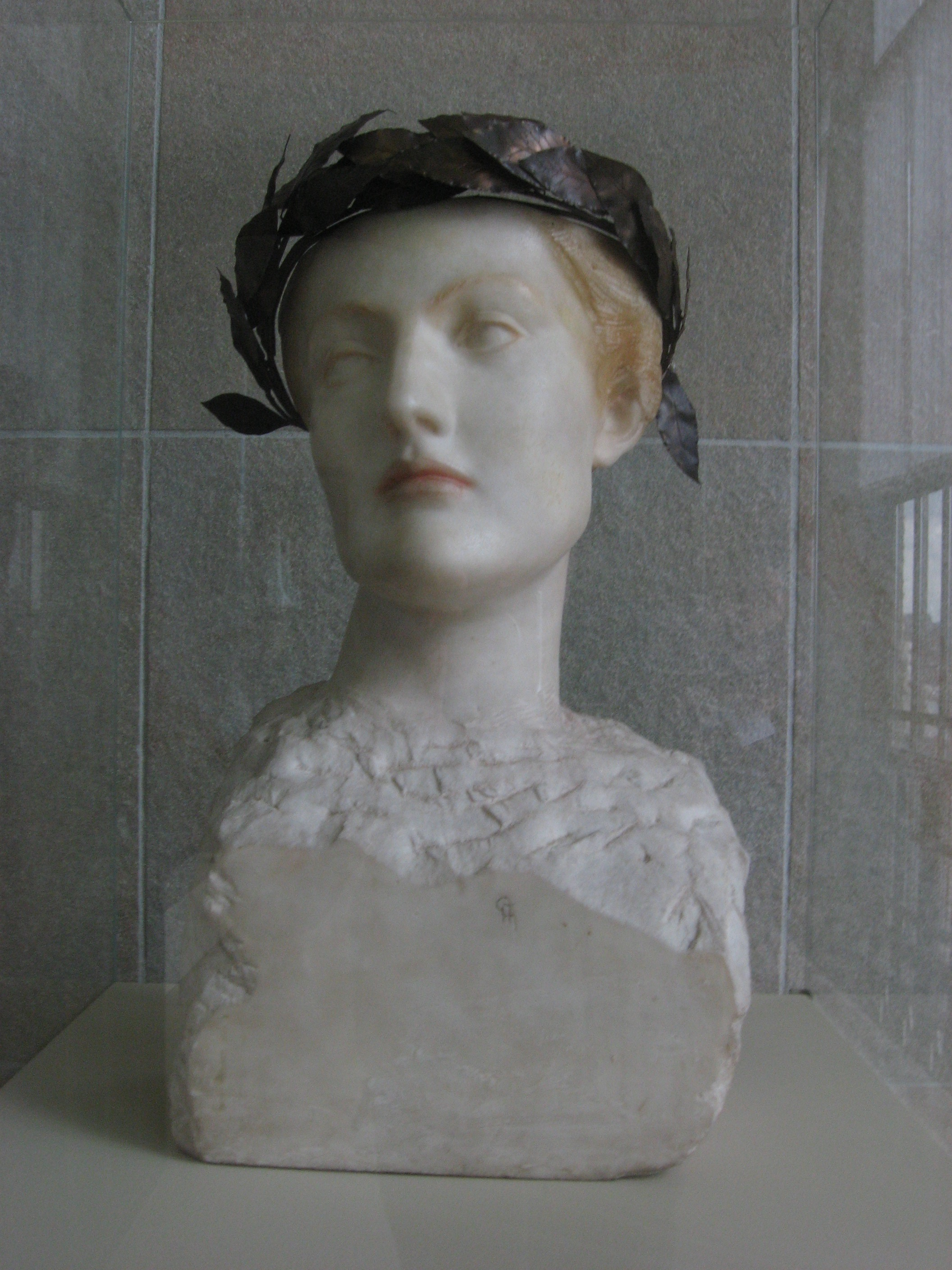
Futur or A Young English Woman, 1898

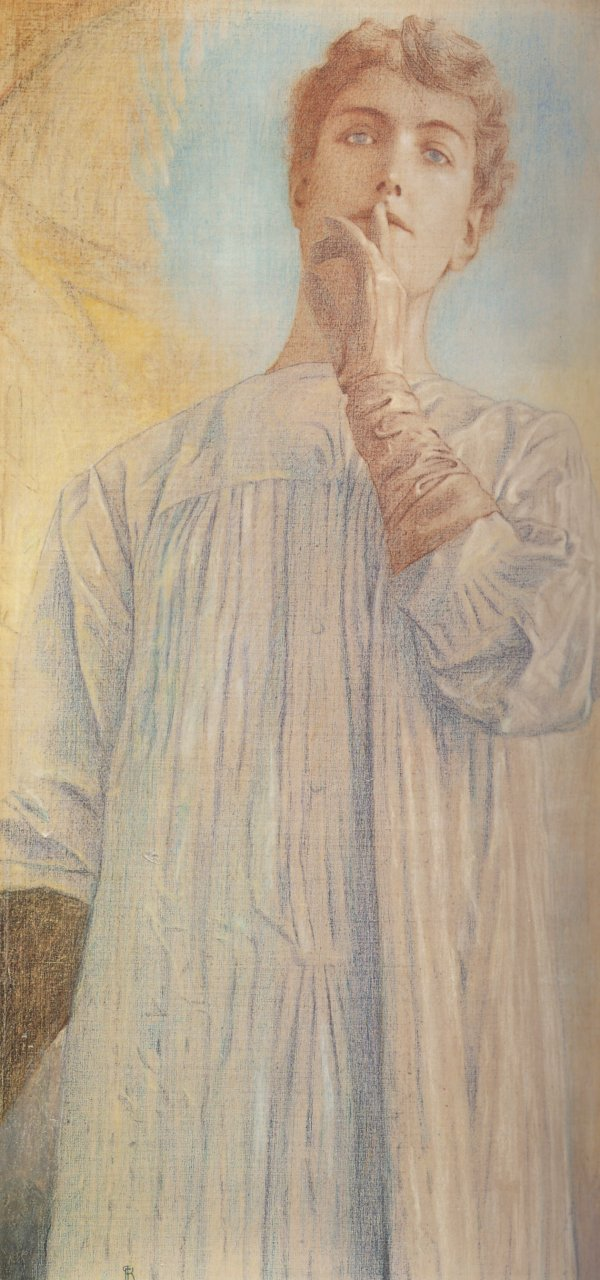
Silence, 1890

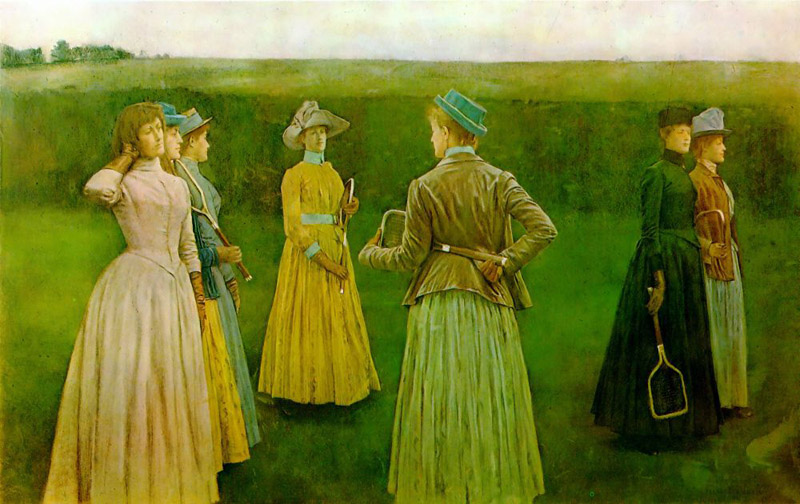
Memories or Lawn Tennis, 1889

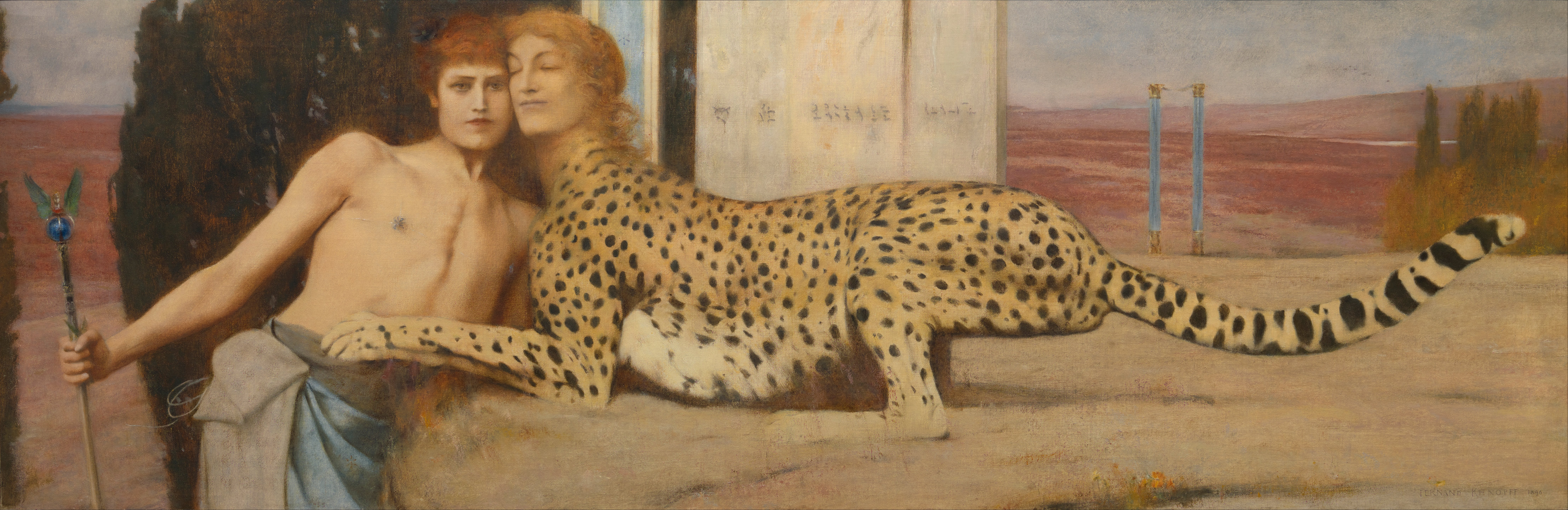
Caress of the Sphinx, 1896

External videos
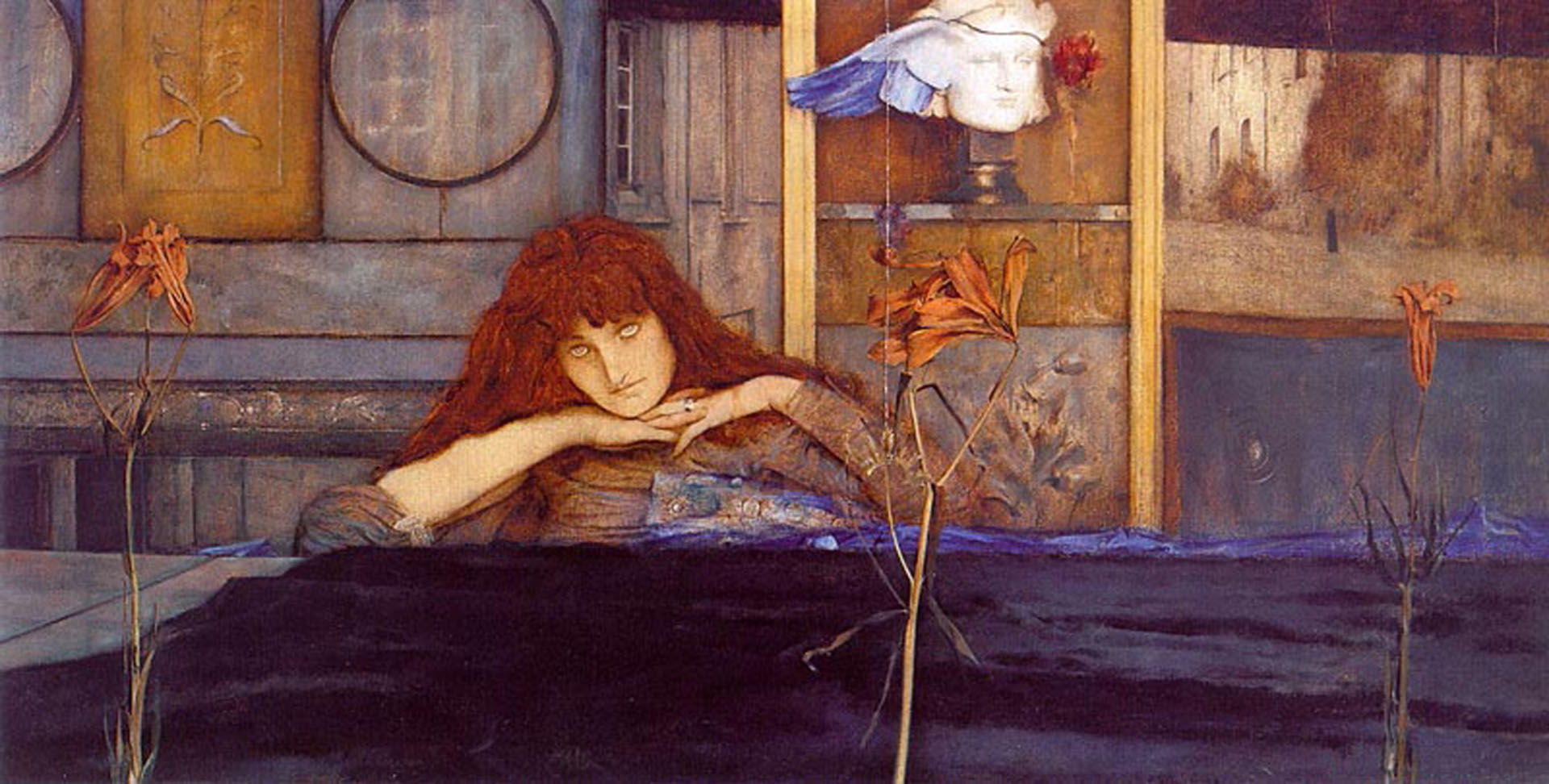
- Khnopff's I Lock the Door Upon Myself, 1891, Smarthistory
- Khnopff's Jeanne Kéfer, Smarthistory
