= Émile Verhaeren =

Belgian poet (1855–1916)

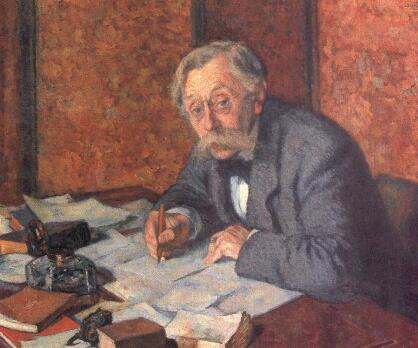
- Portrait of Verhaeren by Théo van Rysselberghe
- Born: 21 May 1855; Sint-Amands, Belgium
- Died: 27 November 1916 (aged 61); Rouen, French Third Republic
- Education: College of Saint Barbara, Ghent
- Alma mater: Catholic University of Louvain
- Occupations: Poet, writer, art critic
- Known for: Symbolism
- Notable work: Les Villes tentaculaires, 1895

Signature
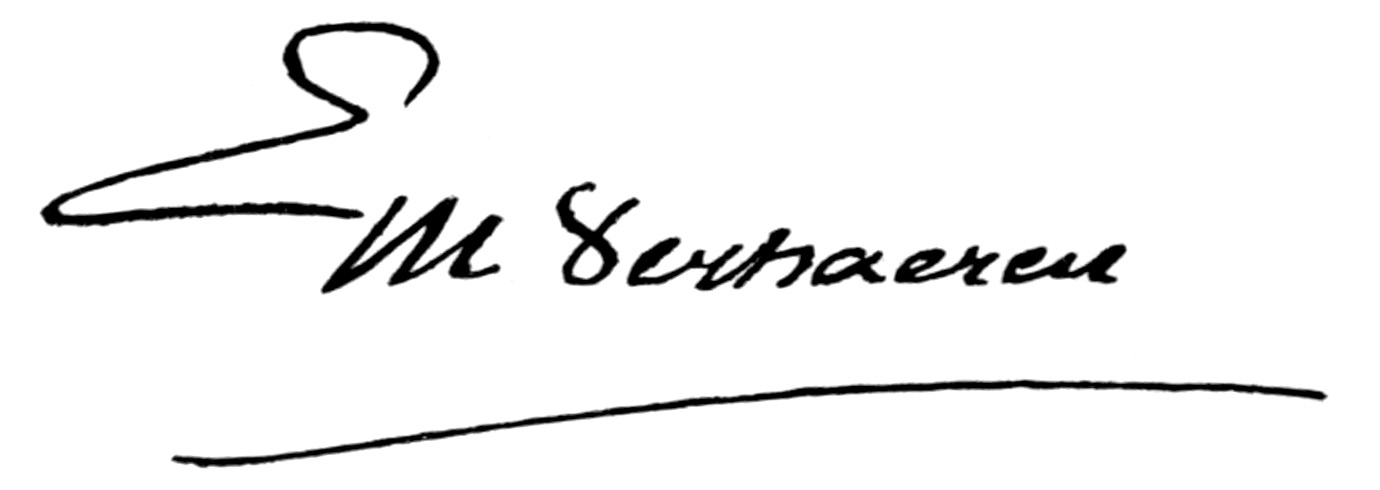

Émile Verhaeren in 1910

Émile Adolphe Gustave Verhaeren (Dutch: [eːˈmilə vərˈɦaːrə(n)]; 21 May 1855 – 27 November 1916) was a Belgian poet and art critic who wrote in the French language. He was one of the founders of the school of Symbolism and was nominated for the Nobel Prize in Literature on six occasions.

== Early life ==
Émile Verhaeren was born into a middle-class French-speaking family in Sint-Amands, a rural commune in Belgium's Province of Antwerp, although he also spoke the local Dutch dialect. At the age of eleven, he was sent to a strict boarding school in Ghent run by Jesuits, the Jesuit College of Sainte Barbe, where he formed a friendship with Georges Rodenbach. He then studied law at the then French-speaking Catholic University of Leuven, where he produced his first literary efforts in a student paper, La Semaine (The Week), which he edited in conjunction with the opera singer Ernest van Dyck. La Semaine was suppressed by the authorities, as was its successor, Le Type, where his colleagues included Max Waller, Iwan Gilkin and Albert Giraud. His like-minded acquaintances later became his collaborators on the revolutionary artistic magazine La Jeune Belgique (Young Belgium).

Having earned his law degree, he trained from 1881 to 1884 under Edmond Picard, a renowned criminal lawyer and influential figure in the Brussels artistic scene. Verhaeren came into frequent contact with young, radical writers and artists at a time of artistic renewal. He spoke in only two court cases before deciding to dedicate his life to poetry and literature.

== Art criticism ==
He soon became the spokesperson for the artistic revival at the turn of the century. Fascinated by the works of the painters of the artistic circle "Les XX", he wrote many articles in La Jeune Belgique and L'Art Moderne with criticism on the artistic-literary works of the Brussels art world. He made himself especially the champion of the impressionist painters, and his articles brought many promising young talents, such as James Ensor and Fernand Khnopff, to the attention of the public.

Through these articles, he became a lifelong friend of the Neo-impressionist Belgian painter Théo van Rysselberghe, resulting in a vast body of letters. In one of these letters, he was described by Maria van Rysselberghe as "a unique personality, a whirlwind with an indomitable character, who didn't bother himself about bourgeois rules and who provoked or overwhelmed everybody by his straightforward directness".

== Literature ==
He was one of the most prolific poets of his era. His first collection of poems, Les Flamandes, was published in 1883. Inspired by the paintings of Jacob Jordaens, David Teniers and Jan Steen, Verhaeren described in a direct and often provocative, naturalistic way his country and the Flemish people. It was an immediate success in avant-garde milieus but caused a great deal of controversy in Catholic circles. His next book, Les Moines (1886), was not the success he had hoped for. This, and his health problems, led to a deep crisis. In this period he published Les Soirs (1888), Les Débâcles (1888) and Les Flambeaux noirs (1891), all with Edmond Deman, who became his usual publisher.

On 24 August 1891 he married Marthe Massin, a talented artist from Liège. His new-found happiness found expression in three poetry books: Les Heures Claires (1896), Les Heures d'Après-midi (1905) and Les Heures du Soir (1911). His later poems include Les Rythmes souverains (1910), Les Villes à pignons (1910), Les Plaines (1911) and Les Blés Mouvants (1912).

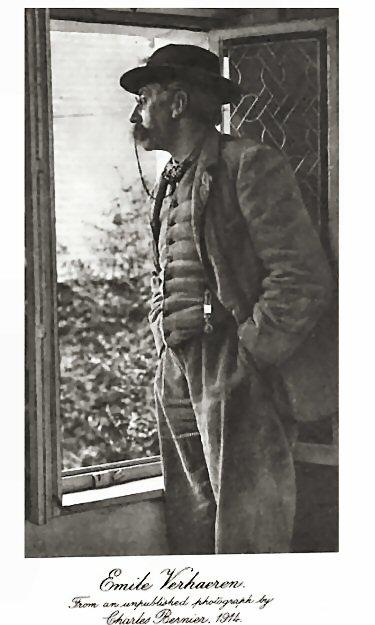
Verhaeren by Stefan Zweig (1914)

He wrote his first play, Les Aubes, in 1898. Here he waged a fight against social injustice and the decline of life in the countryside. In 1912, he produced a tragedy, Hélène de Sparte, which was performed in German and Russian, besides French.

In 1898 he moved to Saint-Cloud, near Paris. By the turn of the century, he had become world-famous. His works were translated into more than twenty languages. His German translator was Stefan Zweig. He travelled, giving lectures, throughout Europe.

Verhaeren was an anarchist. The outbreak of World War I had a devastating effect on the poet's deep pacifist feelings. He went to England, where he received honorary degrees from various universities. During his exile, he published Les Ailes rouges de la Guerre.

== Death ==
Émile Verhaeren died on 27 November 1916 at Rouen station; he fell under a moving train while trying to board it.

St. Amands, his native city, has dedicated a museum to this giant of Belgian literature, showing many original manuscripts of his works and letters along with works of his artistic friends Théo van Rysselberghe, Léon Spilliaert, Constantin Meunier, Paul Signac and Ossip Zadkine. Verhaeren was the cousin of the painter Alfred Verhaeren.

== Honours ==
- 1920: Posthumous Grand Cordon of the Order of Leopold.

== Selected works ==
- Les Flamandes, 1883
- Les Moines, 1886
- Les Soirs, 1888
- Les Débâcles, 1888
- Les Flambeaux noirs, 1891
- Les Campagnes hallucinées, 1893
- Les Villes tentaculaires, 1895
- Les Heures claires, 1896
- Les Visages de la vie, 1899
- Les Forces tumultueuses, 1902
- La Multiple Splendeur, 1906
- Les Rythmes souverains, 1910
- Les Ailes rouges de la guerre, 1916
- Les Flammes hautes, 1917 [written in 1914]
- Belle Chair, 1931 [published posthumously]
