= Les Villes tentaculaires =

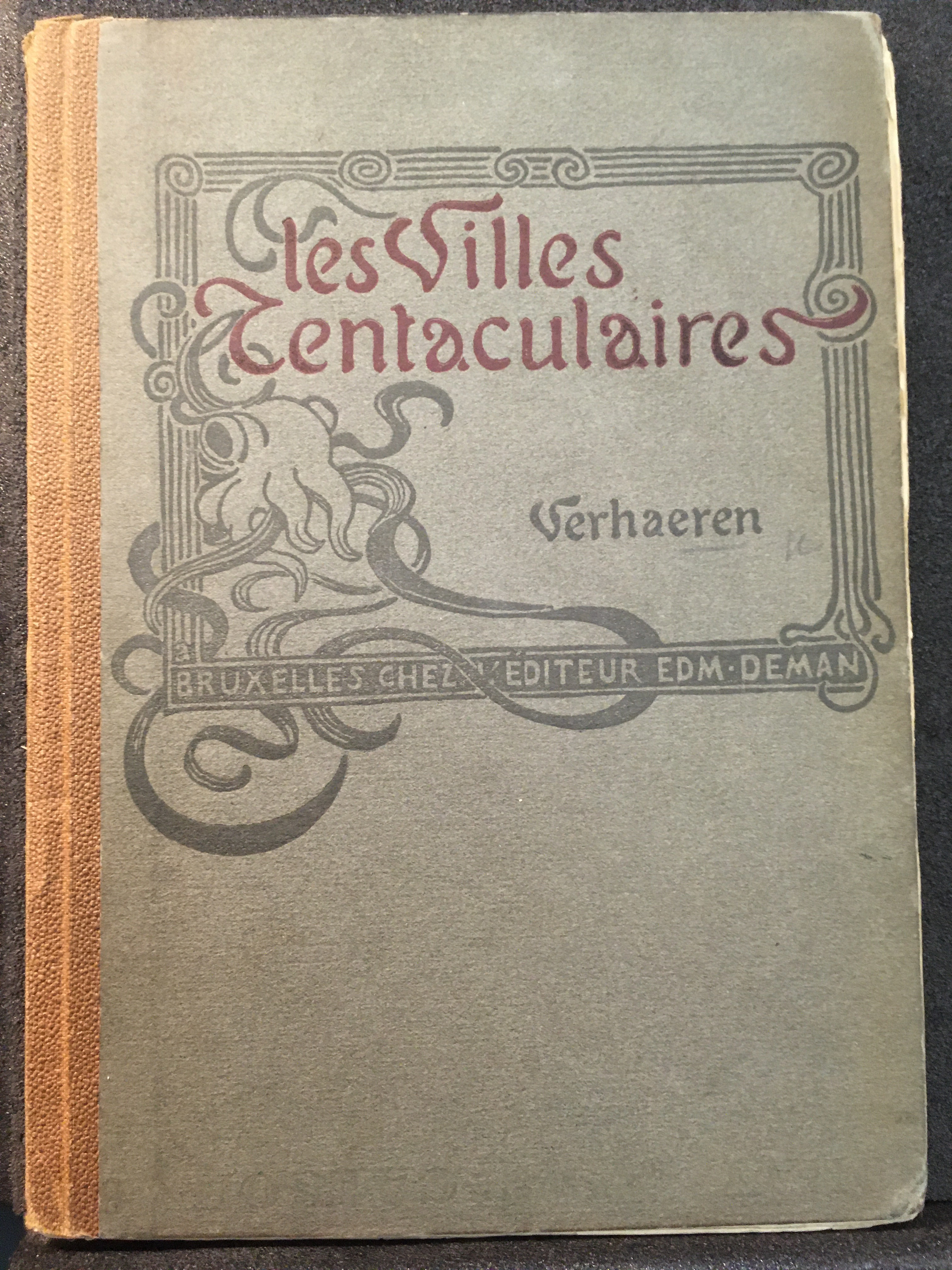
- Author: Émile Verhaeren
- Language: French
- Genre: Symbolist poetry
- Published: 1895
- Publisher: Edmond Deman
- Publication place: Belgium
- Media type: Print
- Original text: Les Villes tentaculaires at French Wikisource

Les Villes tentaculaires (transl. The Tentacular Towns, sometimes rendered The Great Cities or The Many-Tentacled Town) is a volume of Symbolist poetry in French by the Belgian Émile Verhaeren, first published in 1895 by Edmond Deman, with a frontispiece by Théo van Rysselberghe. It established the poet's European reputation, and his stature as "a true pioneer of Modernism". The loose theme of the collection is modern urban life and the transformation of the countryside by urban sprawl.

The theme of urban sprawl had already been broached in Verhaeren's 1893 collection Les Campagnes hallucinées (The Hallucinated Fields). The two collections were generally printed together in one volume from 1904 onwards.

== Contents ==
In the 18th edition of the joint publication Les Villes tentaculaires, précédées des Campagnes hallucinées (Paris, 1920), the poems included were as follows. A few of the poems have been published in English translation by Will Stone.

Les Campagnes hallucinées

Les campagnes hallucinées, 1893

- La Ville (Note: Partially translated by Will Stone as "The Town (excerpt)")
- Les Plaines
- Chanson de fou
- Le Donneur de mauvais conseils
- Chanson de fou
- Pèlerinage
- Chanson de fou
- Les Fièvres
- Chanson de fou
- Le Péché
- Chanson de fou
- Les Mendiants (Note: Translated by Will Stone as "The Beggars")
- La Kermesse
- Chanson de fou
- Le Fléau
- Chanson de fou (Note: Translated by Will Stone as "Madman's Song")
- Le Départ
- La Bêche

Les Villes tentaculaires

- La Plaine (Note: Translated by Will Stone as "The Plain")
- L'Âme de la ville (Note: Translated by Will Stone as "The Soul of the Town")
- Une Statue
- Les Cathédrales
- Une Statue
- Le Port
- Les Spectacles
- Les Promeneuses
- Une Statue
- Les Usines
- La Bourse
- Le Bazar
- L'Étal
- La Révolte
- Au Musée
- Une Statue
- La Mort
- La Recherche
- Les Idées
- Vers le futur
