= Marthe Massin =

Belgian painter (1860–1931)

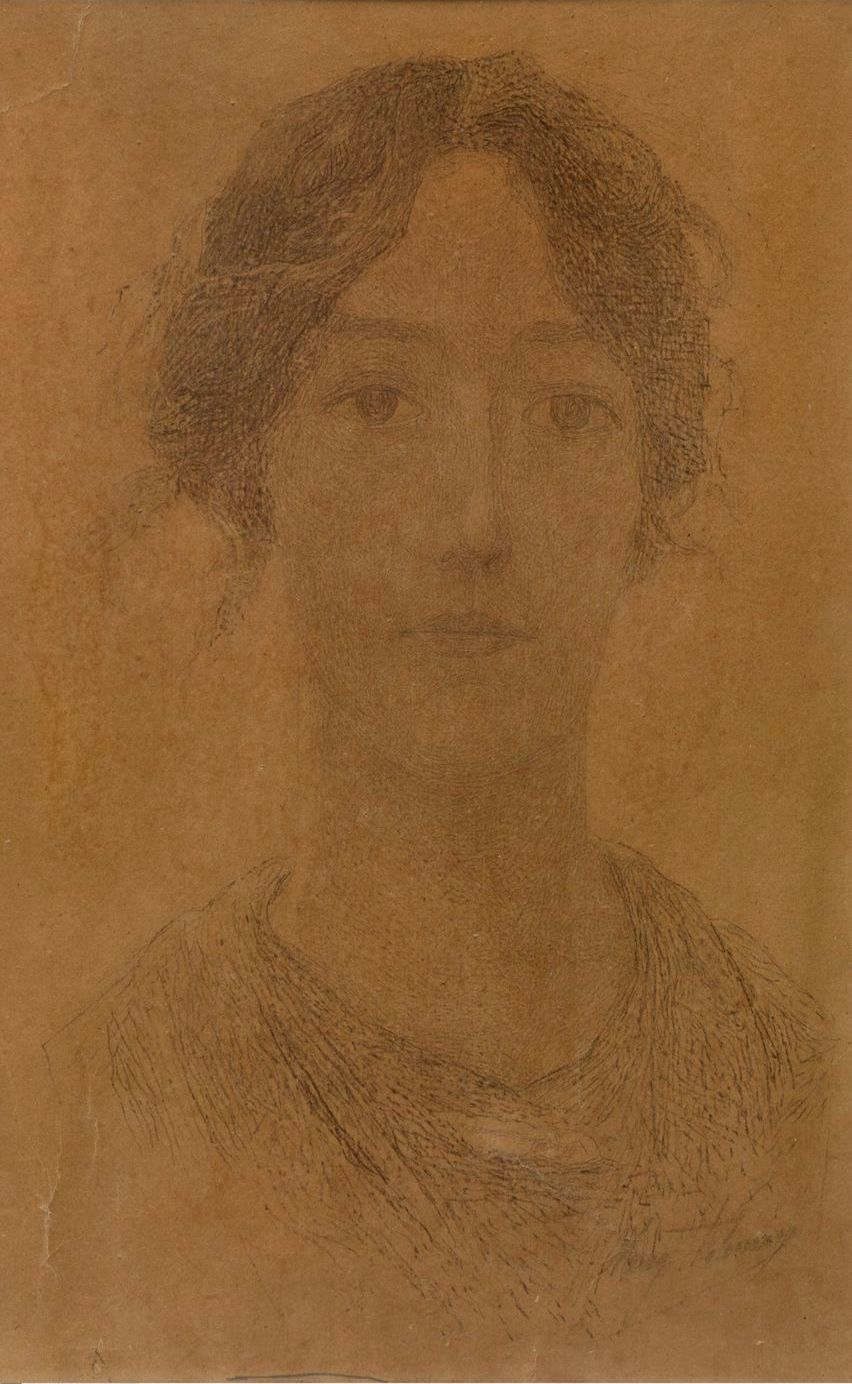
- Portrait by Auguste Donnay
- Born: 6 October 1860; Liege, Belgium
- Died: 2 June 1931 (aged 70); Brussels, Belgium
- Known for: Painting

Marthe Massin aka Marthe Verhaeren (6 October 1860 – 2 June 1931) was a Belgian painter and muse of the famous Belgian poet Émile Verhaeren. She was instrumental in preserving the memory of the work and life of Emile Verhaeren.

== Life ==
Massin was born into a wealthy family on 6 October 1860 in Liège, Belgium. Her mother was Constance Marchet and her father Gustave Massin, a cigar merchant that moved his family to Brussels in 1877. She had a younger sister, Juliette (1866–1919), who married the Belgian painter William Degouve de Nuncques in 1894.

The sisters Massin trained at the private art academy "Blanc-Garin" founded by the Belgian painter Ernest Blanc-Garin in Brussels that, unlike the state academies, accepted female students since 1883.

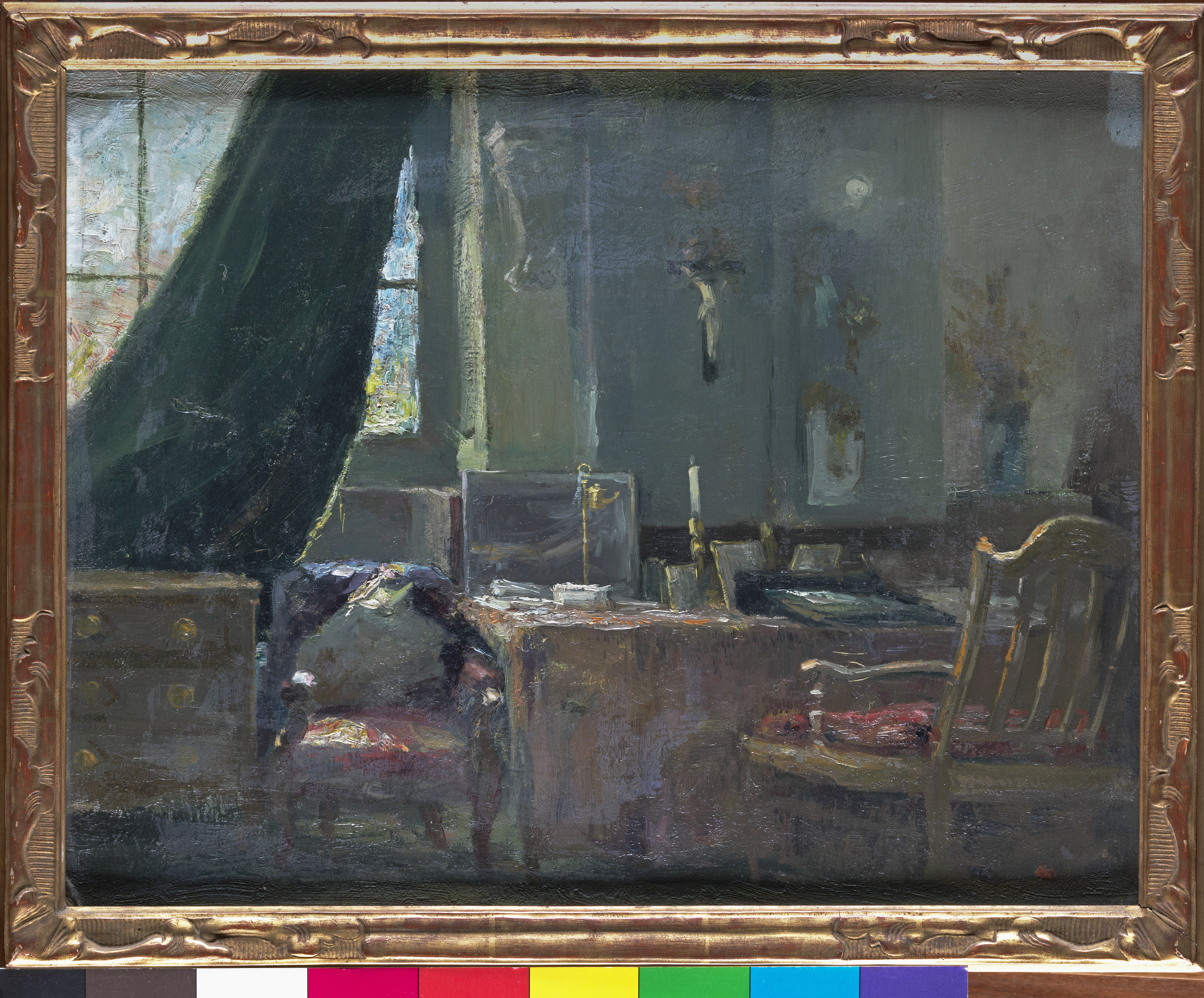
The studio of Marthe Verhaeren in the rue Potagère, by Marthe Massin, Museum Plantin-Moretus (Antwerp)

After her studies, in 1889, she opened her own studio in her parents' house located in Saint-Josse-ten-Noode. Massin painted cityscapes, peasant women and workers. She exhibited her works several times including at the "Salon triennal" in 1884 and the "Salon de Voorwaarts" in 1889. During this period, most of her work focuses on city views, figures of peasant women and workers she met during her summer stays in Borchtlombeek or Bornem.

Massin also taught painting herself among others to the children of Count Marnix von Sint-Aldegonde in Bornem. It was there in 1889 that she met the poet Émile Verhaeren. The meeting is described in Verhaeren's biographies as "love at first sight". The feelings were mutual according to the correspondence following the meeting. The couple married on 24 August 1891.

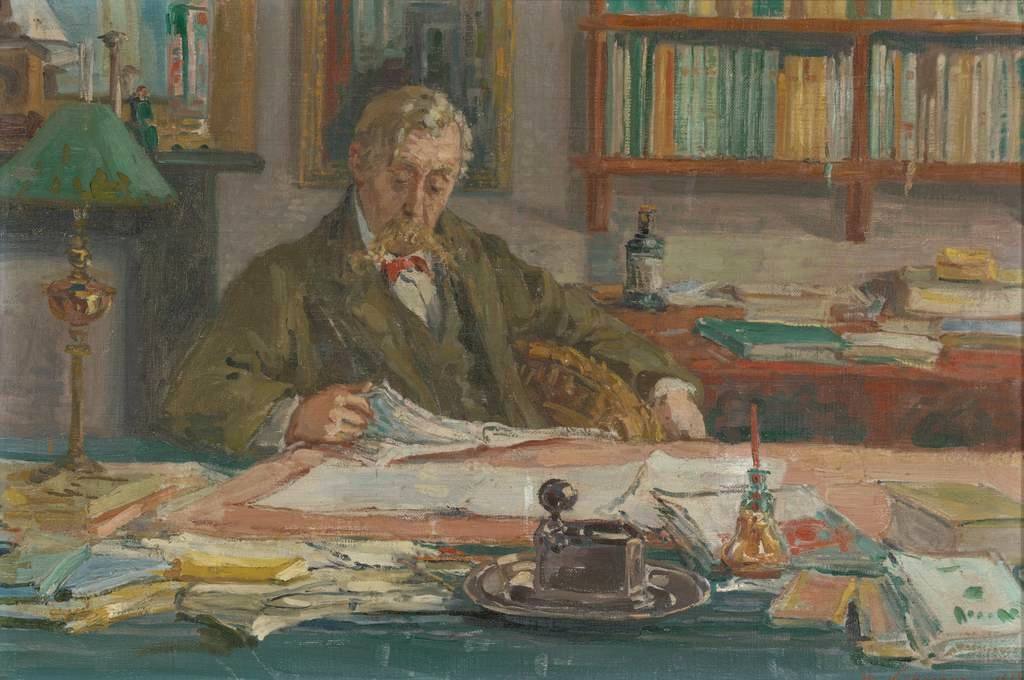
Emile Verhaeren at the Caillou-qui-bique, reading at his work table

The marriage influenced both Massins and Verhaeren's artistic careers. When Marthe entered Émile's life, the torments he manifested in his writing disappeared from his work and started to write several collections of love poems. Massin stopped teaching and their life together became the subject of her drawings and paintings. She painted the garden where they met or their house, using different techniques such as oil paint, red chalk or ink. She made small studies of the pens and pencils on Verhaeren's desk. Verhaeren encouraged her artistic activities and continued to paint but she never exhibited her work publicly again.

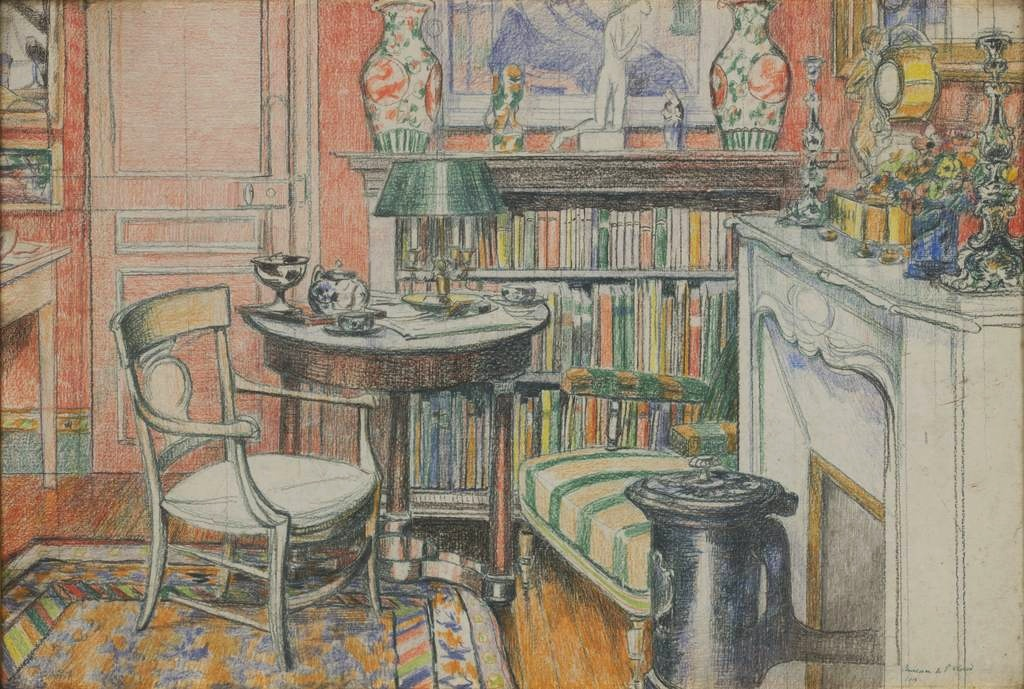
Emile Verhaeren's office in Saint-Cloud by Marthe Massin

Massin assisted her husband in the elaboration of his books of poems. She transcribes the texts and helps him in the compilation of the original manuscripts.

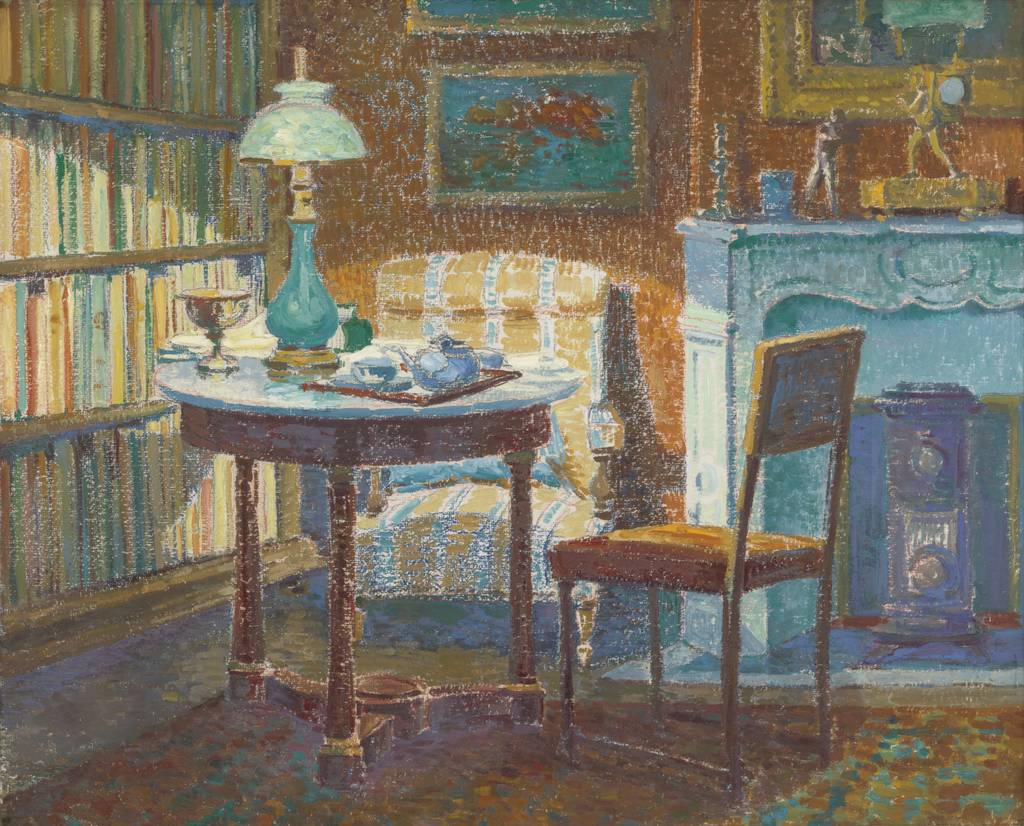
Emile Verhaeren's office in Saint-Cloud by Marthe Massin

Émile Verhaeren died on 27 November 1916 at Rouen station from an unfortunate fall under a moving train while trying to board it. It is with the insistence of Marthe that the body of Verhaeren could rest in Sint-Amands on the banks of the river Scheldt, the poet's birthplace.

Until her own death in 1931, Massin devoted herself to his legacy and memory. She had their house in Caillou-qui-bique, next to Mons, rebuilt after its destruction during World War I. In 1930, she donated of part of Verhaeren's literary legacy to the Royal Library of Belgium, including copies of his private library, special editions, and unpublished poems. In addition, she undertook to have Verhaeren's study in Saint-Cloud rebuilt. The Cabinet Émile Verhaeren, with its original furniture, is now in display at the Royal Library of Belgium. Massin bequested Verhaeren's entire archive to that same library upon her death in 1931.

== Legacy ==
Marthe Massin and Emile Verhaeren had no children. Directly opposite Verhaeren's mausoleum along the Scheldt river, protected by a dike, is the Marthe Massin Garden. The Marthe Massin Garden is home to Jan Mees' sculpture "Love Seasons", dedicated to the Marthe Massin and Emile Verhaeren. Massin was laid to rest in Emile Verhaeren's mausoleum in 1955 during the celebration of his 100th birthday and the statue was dedicated to the two lovers.

Most of Massin's work is kept in the Archives and Museum of Literature in Brussels. Another part of her legacy ended up in the Plantin-Moretus Museum in Antwerp through a private bequest.

A series of drawings and paintings of Massin were exhibited for the first time in 2015 during the exhibition "Fatal flowers/Poetics of love" at the Verhaeren Museum in Sint-Amands. In 2016, some works were on display during an exhibition on Emile Verhaeren at the Musée des Beaux-Arts of Tournai. Since 2018, a portrait of Verhaeren by her hand has been part of the permanent collection of the Verhaeren Museum and become since then part of the museum's collection.

== Gallery ==
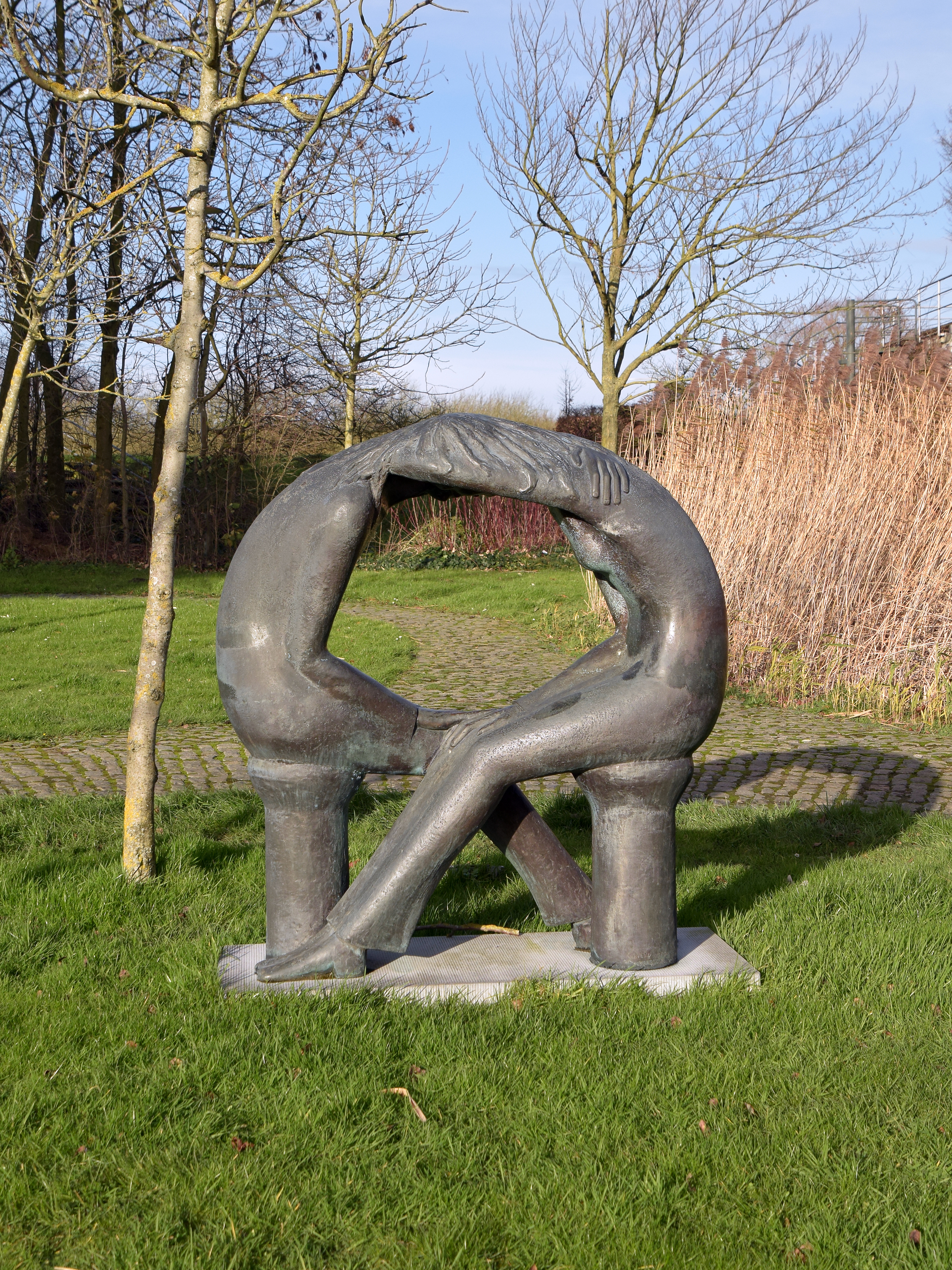
"Love Seasons" by Jan Mees

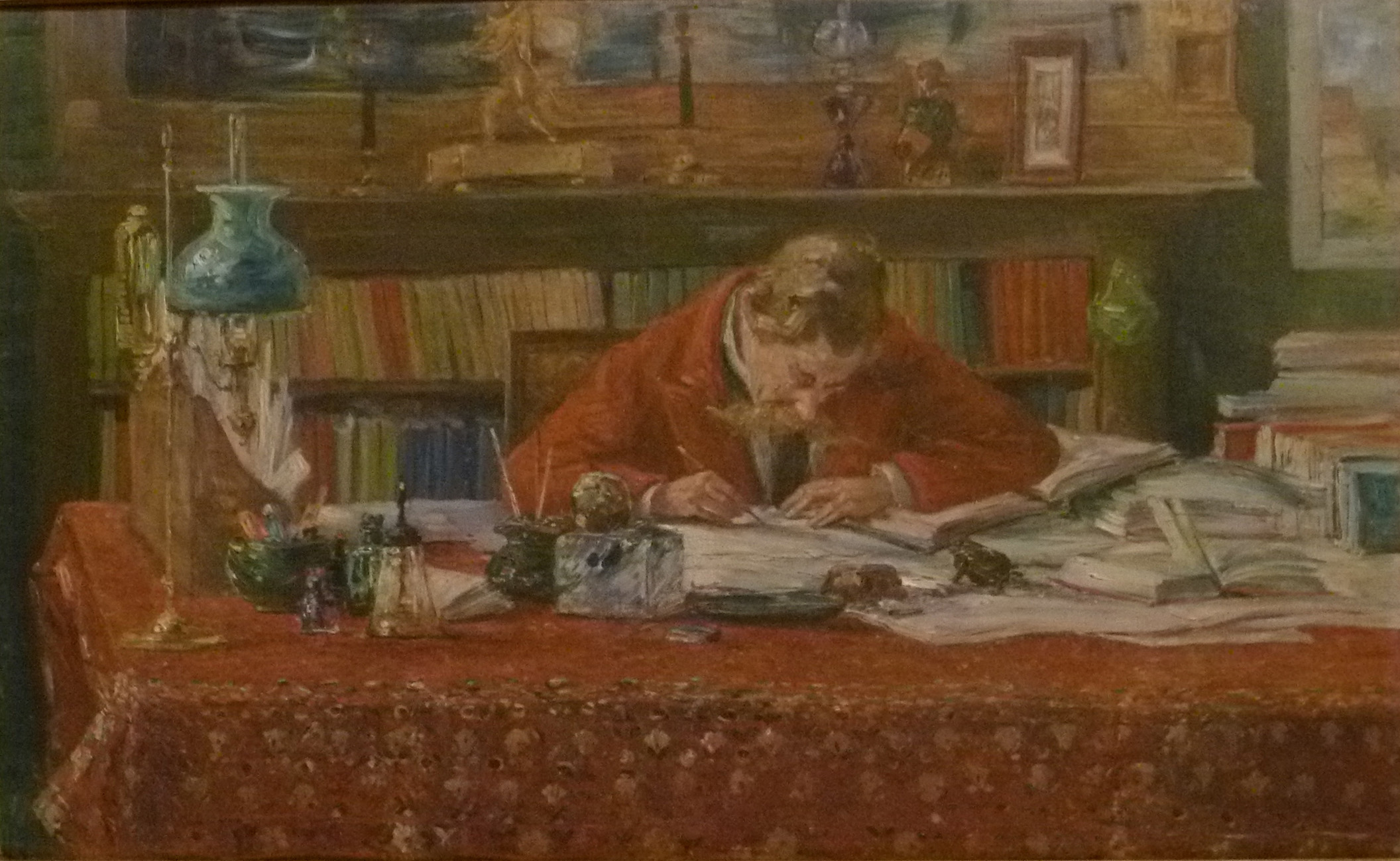
Verhaeren at his work table by Massin

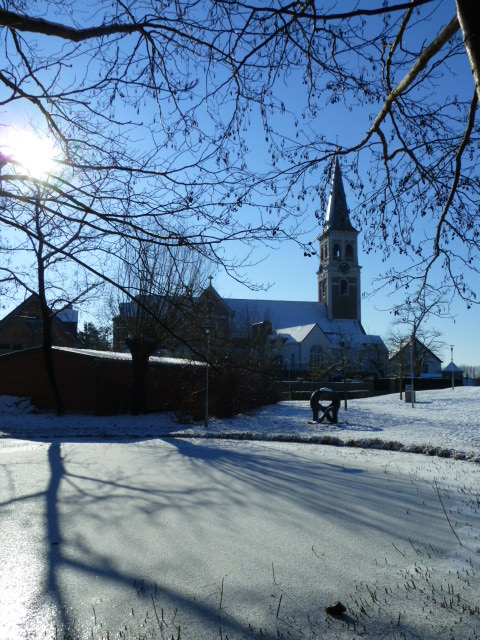
Marthe Massin garden (winter 2021)

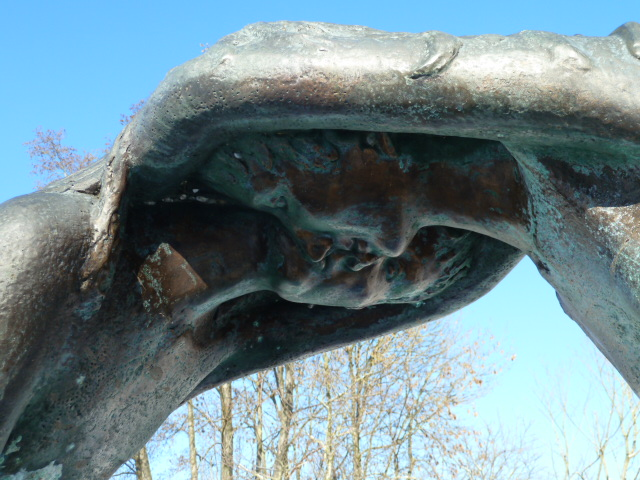
Detail of sculpture "Love Seasons" by Jan Mees
