= Caress of the Sphinx =

1896 painting by Fernand Khnopff

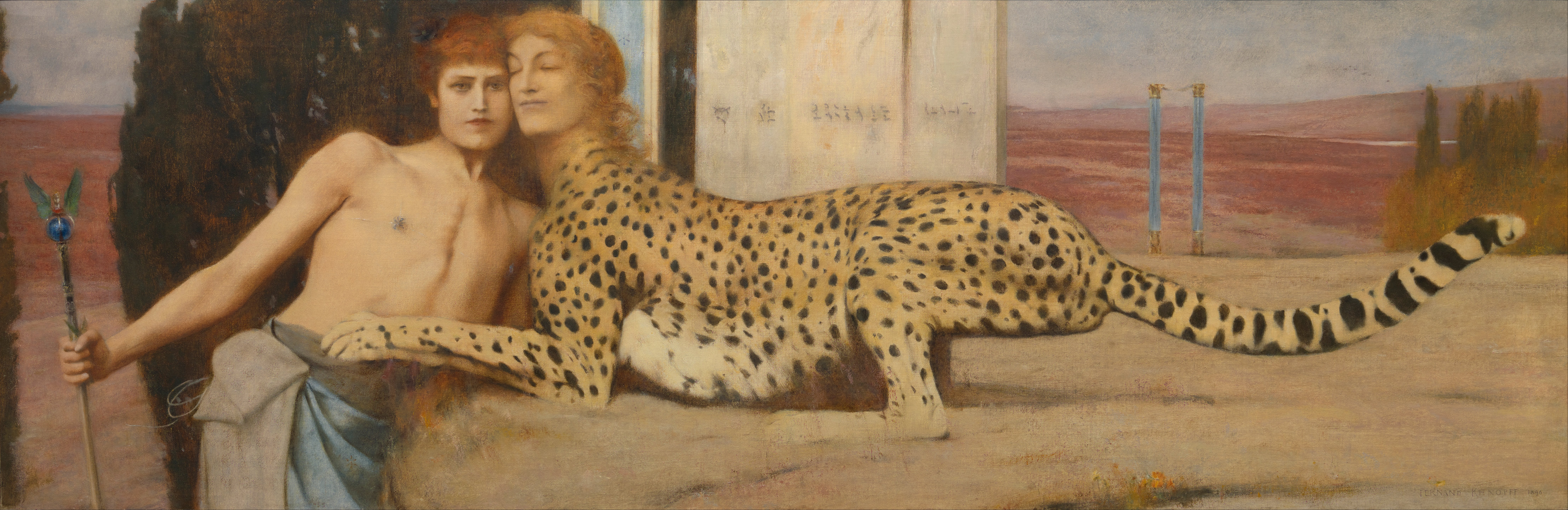
Caress of the Sphinx, 1896

Caress of the Sphinx (also known as Art) is an 1896 painting by the Belgian Symbolist artist Fernand Khnopff (1858–1921) famed for its depiction of androgyny. The work is an interpretation of the French symbolist painter Gustave Moreau's 1864 painting Oedipus and the Sphinx.

It is pointed out in the book Enchanting David Bowie that the album cover artwork by Guy Peellaert for the rock star's 1974 album Diamond Dogs possesses striking similarities to the painting.

The painting plays an important part in the plot of the short story "The Caress" from the 1995 book Axiomatic by Greg Egan.

The painting is in the permanent collection of the Royal Museum of Fine Arts of Belgium in Brussels.

== See also ==
- 100 Great Paintings, 1980 BBC series
