= Portrait of Jeanne Kéfer =

1885 painting by Fernand Khnopff

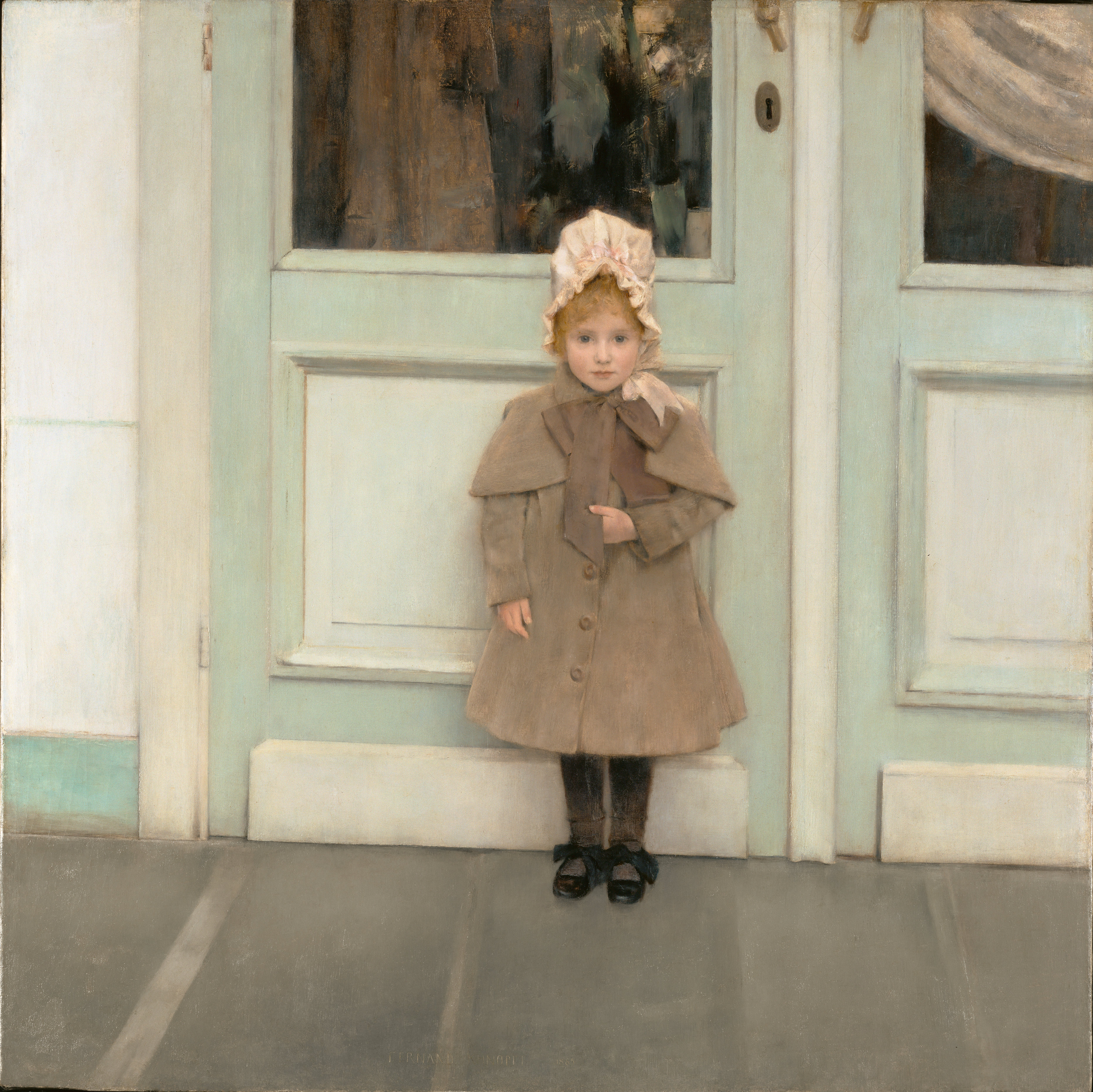
- Portrait of Jeanne Kéfer (1885)
- Artist: Fernand Khnopff
- Year: 1885
- Medium: Oil on canvas
- Dimensions: 80 cm × 80 cm (31.5 in × 31.5 in)
- Location: J. Paul Getty Museum, Los Angeles

Portrait of Jeanne Kéfer is an oil on canvas portrait by Fernand Khnopff, painted in 1885. Currently housed and exhibited in the J. Paul Getty Museum, Los Angeles.

== History ==
A five-year-old Jeanne Kéfer was a daughter of the artist's friend, pianist Gustave Kéfer. The painting had been scheduled to be showcased at Les XX, 1885, in Brussels, but Khnopff had not managed to finish it, and the exhibition took place in 1886. The painting received positive critic reviews.

== Description ==
Jeanne Kéfer is depicted standing on a porch before a closed door with her thumb catching the edge of her bow as she reaches into her coat. The portrait symbolizes the child's vulnerability and uncertainty in facing the outside world. The message is emphasized by the composition itself as the Jeanne's body is framed against the adult-sized door.
