= Xavier Mellery =

Belgian painter

- Born: 9 August 1845; Laken, Belgium
- Died: 4 February 1921 (aged 75); Brussels, Belgium
- Education: Royal Academy of Fine Arts of Brussels
- Occupation: Painter

Xavier Mellery (9 August 1845, Laken – 4 February 1921, Brussels) was a Belgian symbolist painter.

The son of a gardener at the Royal Palace of Laeken, Mellery initially worked with the painter-decorator Charles Albert. He attended the Royal Academy of Fine Arts of Brussels from 1860 to 1867, one of his professors being Jean-François Portaels. Mellery won the Prix de Rome and traveled to Italy where he studied paintings from the Renaissance. His works include The Rondo of the Hours.

Mellery designed the statues of all 48 historical professions in the Petit Sablon/Kleine Zavel garden in Brussels, though they were executed by different sculptors. Each pillar has a unique design, as does each section of fence.

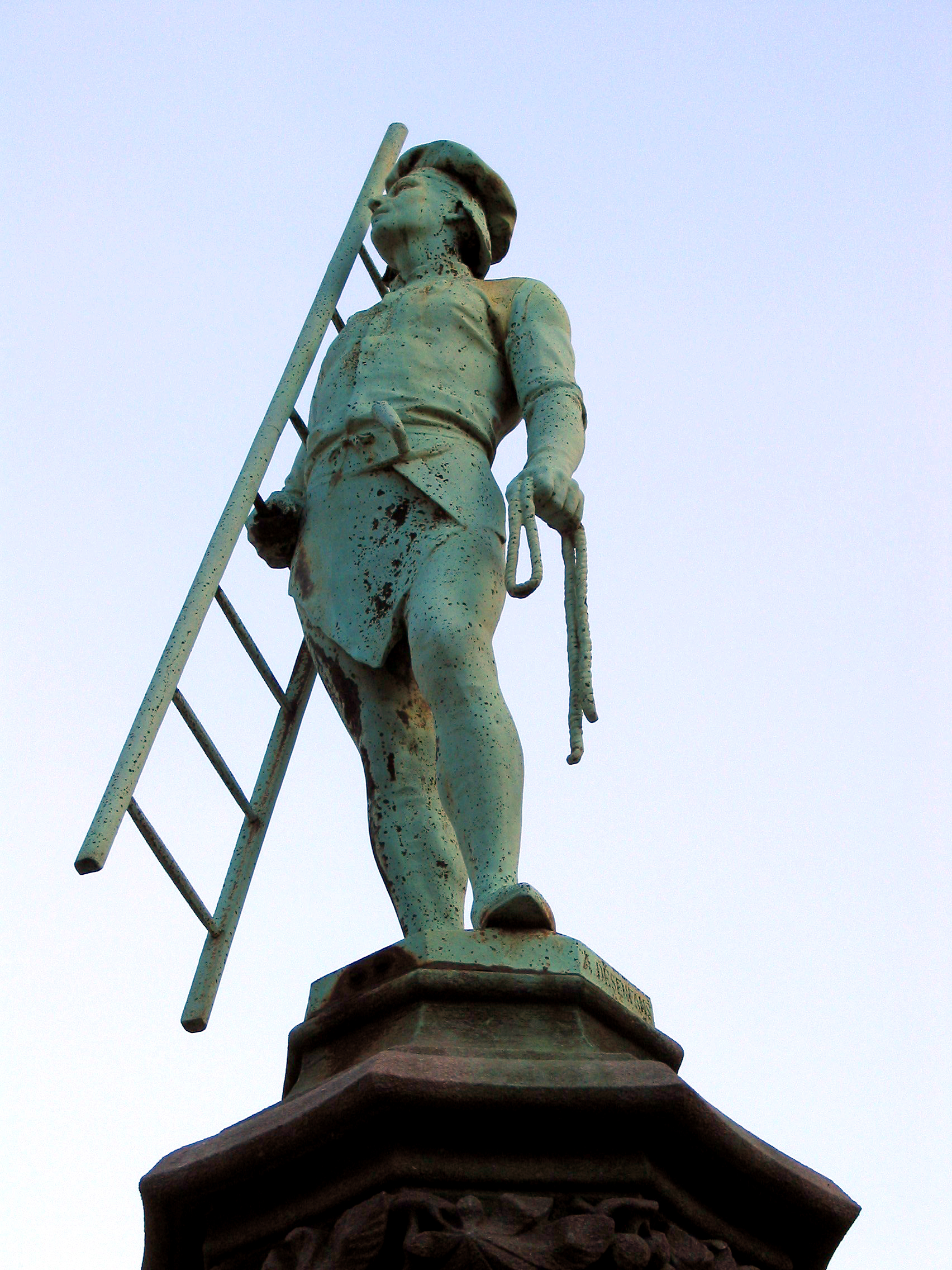
The Slater by Albert Desenfans

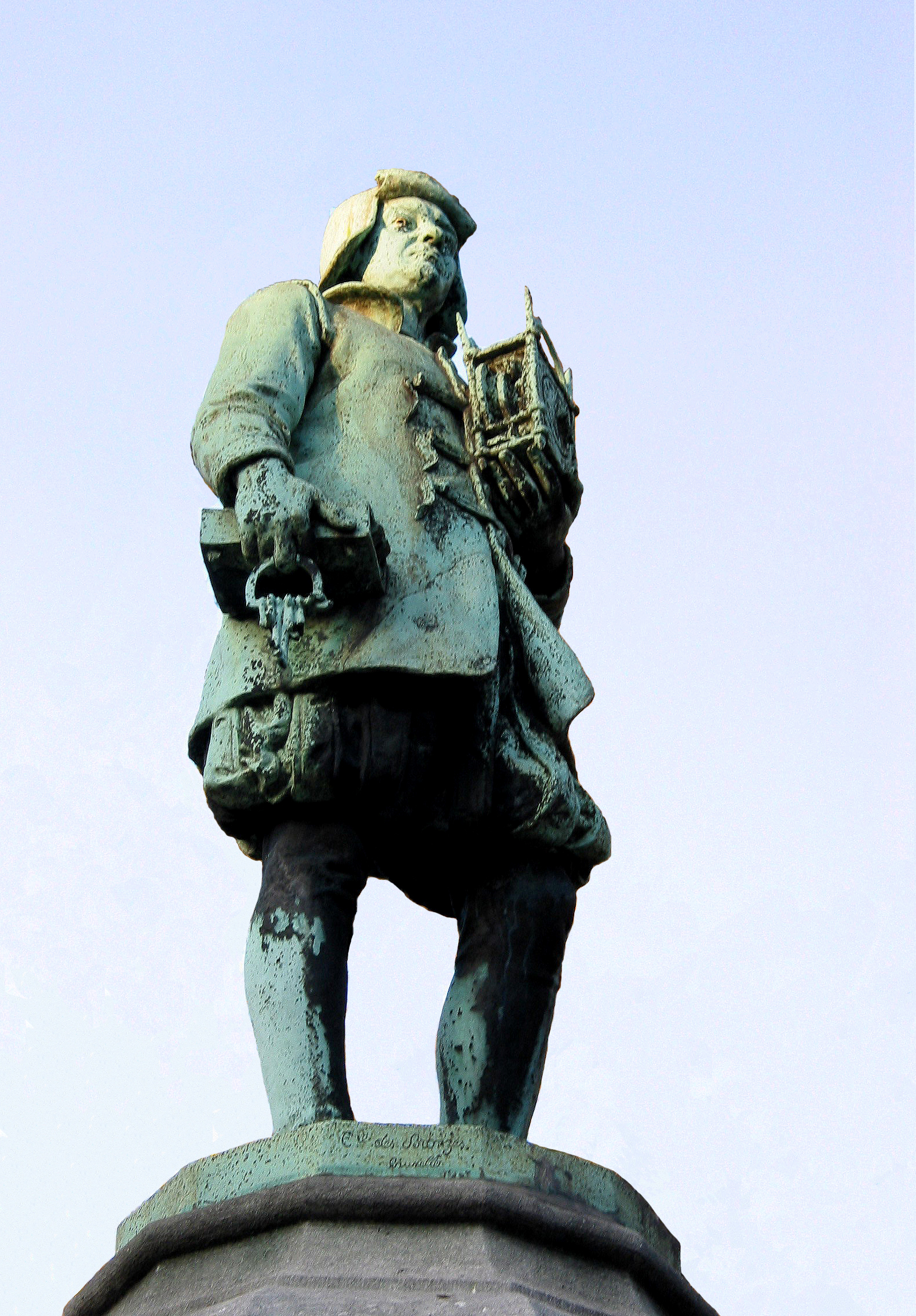
The Clockmaker by Jean Cuypers

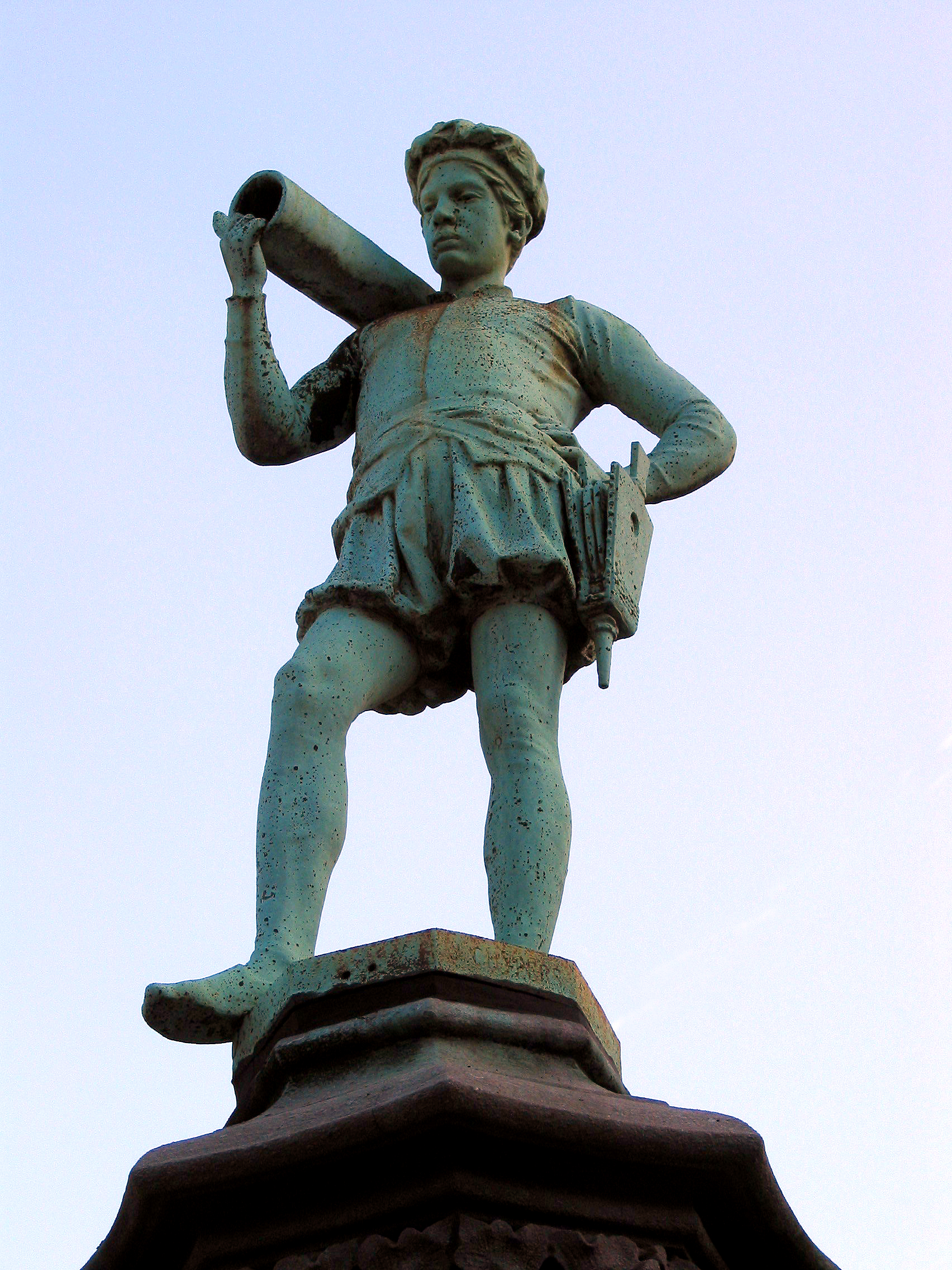
The Plumber by Cuypers

== Honours ==
1885: Knight in the Order of Leopold.
