= La Jeune Belgique =

Belgian literary society and movement

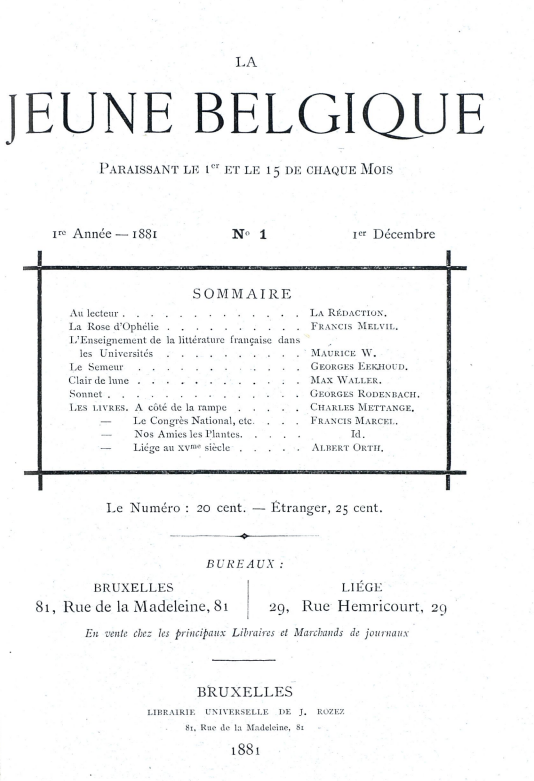
Summary page of the first issue of the magazine La Jeune Belgique in 1881

La Jeune Belgique (meaning The Young Belgium in English) was a Belgian literary society and movement that published a French-language literary review La Jeune Belgique between 1880 and 1897. Both the society and magazine were founded by the Belgian poet Max Waller. Contributors to the review included Georges Rodenbach, Eugene Demolder, Émile Verhaeren, Maurice Maeterlinck, Charles van Lerberghe, Albert Giraud, Georges Eekhoud, Camille Lemonnier and Auguste Jennart.

The magazine was started in 1880 under the name La Jeune revue littéraire which was changed to La Jeune Belgique in 1881. The headquarters of the magazine, which was published biweekly, was in Brussels. In its later year the frequency of the magazine became published monthly and then, bimonthly. In addition, the magazine was published both in Brussels and in Paris during this period.
