= Max Waller (writer) =

Belgian poet, critic, novelist and playwright

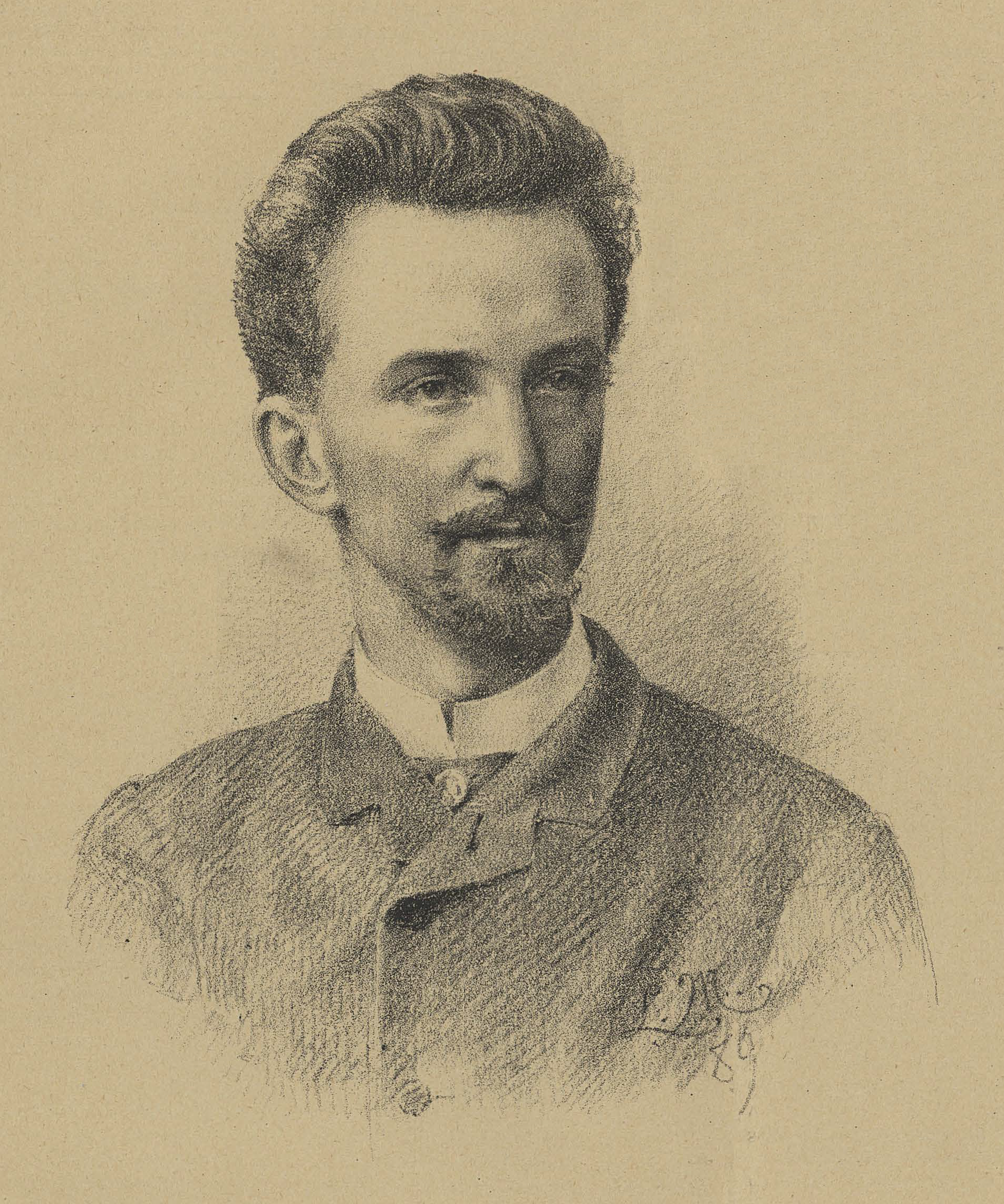
Portrait of Max Waller 1889

Léopold Nicolas Maurice Édouard Warlomont (24 February 1860, Brussels - 6 March 1889, Saint-Gilles), was a Belgian poet, critic, novelist, and playwright, best known under his pen name, Max Waller.

He was one of the founders of the literary review La Jeune Belgique in 1881. At the beginning of his career he published under several noms de plumes: Olivier, Peter Corneille, Jacques (in the literary journal La Nation), Rimaille and Siebel, before adopting the pseudonym Max Waller.

== Sources ==
- Paul André, Max Waller et La Jeune Belgique, Bruxelles, Le Thyrse/Librairie Vanderlinden, 1905, 155 p.
