= Iwan Gilkin =

Belgian poet

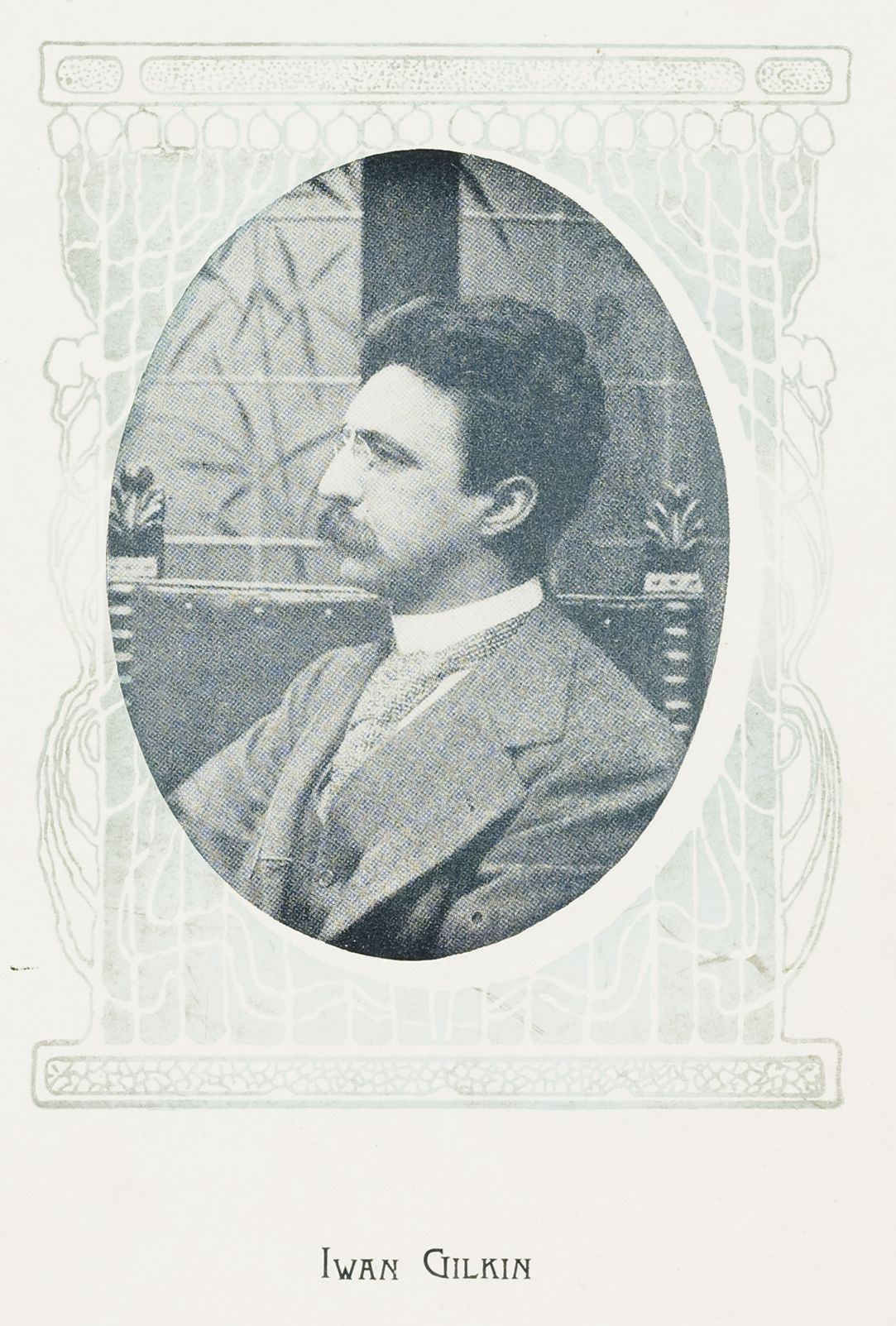
- Iwan Gilkin
- Born: 7 January 1858; Brussels, Belgium
- Died: 28 September 1924 (aged 66); Brussels, Belgium
- Occupation: poet

Iwan Gilkin (7 January 1858 – 28 September 1924) was a Belgian poet. Born in Brussels, Gilkin was associated with the Symbolist school in Belgium.

His works include Les ténèbres (1892, featuring a frontispiece by Odilon Redon) and Le Sphinx (1907). Linked with the development of the literary revue the Parnasse de la Jeune Belgique, he was an early appreciator of the Comte de Lautréamont's infamous work, Les Chants de Maldoror, and sent several copies of the book to his friends, including fellow poet Léon Bloy.

His mature works, which often concerned difficult religious and philosophical themes, reflect a highly pessimistic, spiritual and anti-positivistic outlook, influenced by Charles Baudelaire and Arthur Schopenhauer. A French-language study of Gilkin by Henri Liebrecht was published in 1941.

== Bibliography ==
- La Damnation de l'artiste (1890)
- Ténèbres (1892)
- Stances dorées (1893)
- La Nuit (1893) (→ French Wikisource)
- Prométhée (1897)
- Le Cerisier fleuri (1899)
- Jonas (1900)
- Savonarole (1906)
- Étudiants russes (1906)
- Le Sphinx (1907)
- Le Roi Cophétua (1919)
- Les Pieds d'argile (1921)
- Egmont (1926)
