= Timeline of Brussels (21st century) =

The following is a timeline of the history of Brussels, Belgium, in the 21st century.

== 2001–2009 ==
- 2001
  - Tour & Taxis begins redevelopment.
  - The first Bronze Zinneke is presented to Johan Verminnen.
  - 9 January: The first EXKi fast casual restaurant opens at the Namur Gate.
  - 16 January: Freddy Thielemans is elected mayor for the second time.
  - 26 February: FM Brussel is launched, as the campus radio of RITS.
  - 17 April–8 June: The Butare Four are tried in the city for war crimes during the Rwandan genocide, marking Belgium's first conviction for crimes committed abroad under international law.
  - 28 April: Police Zone: Brussels - Ixelles is formed as the sixth police zone in the city.
  - 13 July: The Lambermont Accord is signed, increasing the representation of Dutch speakers in the Brussels Parliament.
  - 25 October: Princess Elisabeth, Duchess of Brabant is born at Erasmus Hospital.
- 2002
  - The first Brussels Summer Festival is held.
  - 7 May: Ahmed Isnasni and Habiba El-Hajji are shot dead by their neighbour, Hendrik Vyt, at their residence in Schaerbeek. Vyt also wounds two of their sons before committing self-immolation.
  - 1 September: The Jules Bordet Royal Athenaeum becomes part of Institut technique de la Communauté française Chômé-Wyns and changes it name to Leonardo da Vinci Royal Athenaeum.
  - 10 December: The Film Museum in integrated into CINEMATEK.
- 2003
  - The first Brusseleir van’t joêr is presented to Roger Van de Voorde.
  - 13 March: The Iris Festival is created by ordinance.
  - 6 June: Daniel Ducarme becomes Minister-President.
  - 26 June: Brasserie de la Senne is established; The Institute for the Encouragement of Scientific Research and Innovation of Brussels is established by ordinance.
  - 20 September: The Bibliotheca Wittockiana opens to the public.
- 2004
  - The North Galaxy Towers are built.
  - 16 January: Kosovar teacher and independence activist Musa Hoti is assassinated by the UDBA after multiple failed attempts.
  - 18 February: Jacques Simonet becomes Minister-President for the second time.
  - 1 March–17 June: The trial of the Dutroux affair takes place.
  - 14–17 April: The BRussells Tribunal is held as part of the World Tribunal on Iraq.
  - 28 June: The Vlaams-Nederlands Huis is established by the Dutch and Flemish governments to promote the culture of the Low Countries.
- 2005
  - The first Be Film Festival is held.
  - 19 July: The BELvue Museum opens in the Hôtel Belle-Vue; Charles Picqué becomes Minister-President for the second time.

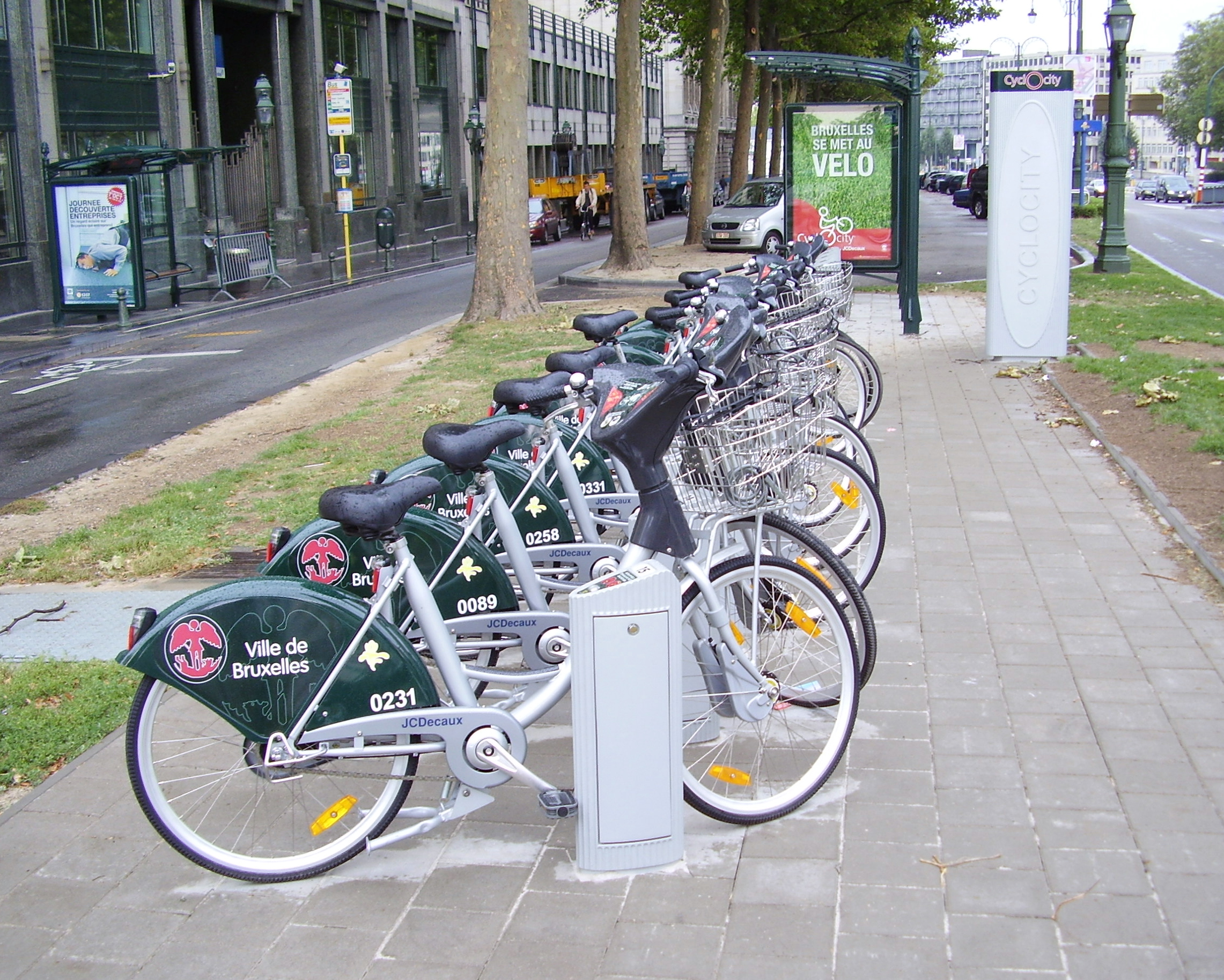
Cyclocity shared bicycles in Brussels, 23 September 2006

- 2006
  - The Atomium is renovated.
  - 6 March: Tram line 24 begins service.
  - 12 April: Joe Van Holsbeeck is fatally stabbed at Brussels-Central railway station in an attempted robbery of his MP3 player.
  - 29 August: Benjamin Rawitz-Castel is murdered during a robbery by Junior Kabunda.
  - 17 September: The Cyclocity bicycle-sharing system is launched in the Pentagon.
  - 23–29 September: Riots break out in the Marolles after Fayçal Chaaban is found dead in his cell.
  - 8 October: Brussels municipal elections are held.
- 2007
  - The Hogeschool-Universiteit Brussel (HUB) is established.
  - 25 March: Brussels Airlines is formed.
  - 25 May: The WIELS contemporary art centre opens in the former Wielemans-Ceuppens brewery.
  - 2 July: Tram line 4 begins service.
  - 28 September: The Manga murder occurs.
- 2008
  - Denis-Adrien Debouvrie, a wealthy local restaurant owner and creator of Jeanneke Pis, is fatally stabbed by the Tunisian restaurant owner Tarek Ladhari.
  - The first Brussels Gallery Weekend is held.
  - The first Offscreen Film Festival is held.
  - 30 June: Tram lines 3 and 51 commence service.
  - November: The Meyboom is added to the Representative List of the Intangible Cultural Heritage of Humanity as part of 'Processional giants and dragons in Belgium and France'.
- 2009
  - The Stoclet Palace is listed as a UNESCO World Heritage Site.
  - 4 April: Reorganisation of the Metro results in the creation of lines 1, 5, and 6.
  - 16 May: Cyclocity is rebranded to Villo! and expanded to the whole region.
  - 2 June: The Magritte Museum opens.
  - 18 June: The Marc Sleen Museum is opened in the presence of Marc Sleen, as well as King Albert II.
  - 17 November: Olivier Bastin is appointed the first Architect of the Brussels-Capital Region.
  - 12 December: The funeral of Queen Fabiola takes place.

== 2010–2019 ==
- 2010
  - Population of the Brussels-Capital Region: 1,089,538.
  - 18 January: André-Joseph Léonard is appointed Archbishop of Mechelen–Brussels.
  - 24 November: The Cercle de Lorraine is reestablished at the Hôtel de Mérode-Westerloo.
  - 26–29 November: The European Assembly for Climate Justice is held.
- 2011
  - 14 March: Tram line 7 begins operations, replacing the routes previously covered by lines 23 and 24.
  - 5 October: A repeater of the Gdańsk Pulsar Clock is installed in the European Parliament.
- 2012
  - 13 March: Muslim scholar Abdullah al-Dahdouh is murdered in an unprovoked attack in the Islamic Center of Imam Reza.
  - 10 June: The first Picnic the Streets occurs.
  - 14 October: Brussels municipal elections are held.
  - 2–4 November: The first Brussels Beer Challenge is held in the Bourse Palace.

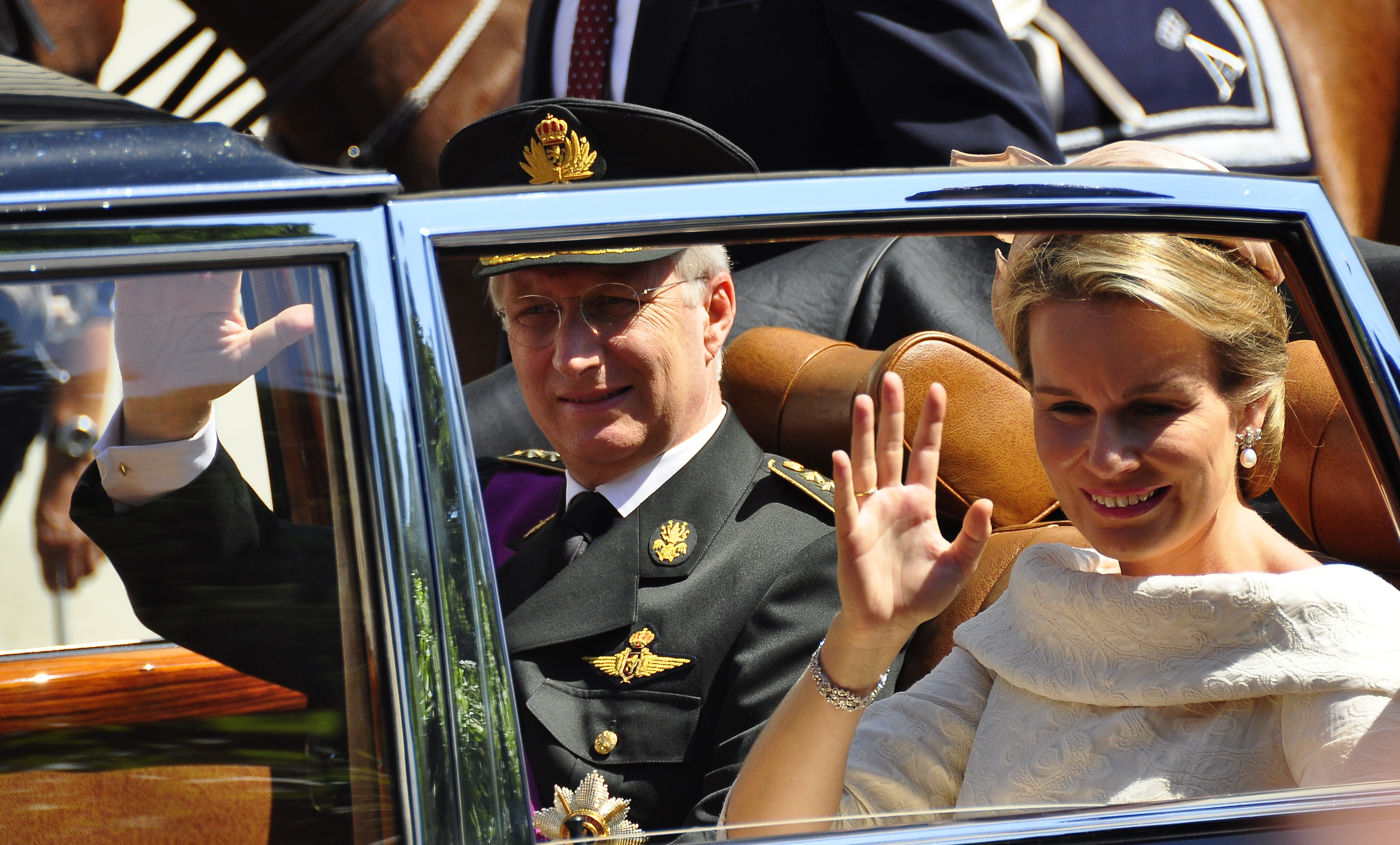
King Philippe and Queen Mathilde wave to crowds in Brussels after his coronation, 21 July 2013

- 2013
  - The first Brusseleir vè’t Leive is presented to Claude Lammens.
  - 19 February: Be.brusseleir is formed.
  - 7 May: Rudi Vervoort becomes Minister-President of the Brussels-Capital Region.
  - 21 July: King Philippe takes the constitutional oath at the Palace of the Nation.
  - 6 December: The Fin-de-Siècle Museum opens.
  - 13 December: Yvan Mayeur is elected mayor.
- 2014
  - 1 January: Odisee is established.
  - 10 March: Vlaams-Brusselse Media forms.
  - 8 May: Tour & Taxis Park opens to the public.
  - 23 May: Choco-Story Brussels is established.
  - 24 May: The Jewish Museum of Belgium shooting occurs, killing 4.
  - 3 June: UP-site is officially opened.
  - 18 June: The .brussels generic top-level domain is added to the DNS root zone.
  - 1 July: The Governor of the Administrative Arrondissement Brussels-Capital is replaced with the Senior Official of the Administrative Arrondissement Brussels-Capital.

Current flag of the Brussels-Capital Region, adopted in 2015

- 2015
  - 9 January: The Brussels-Capital Region adopts a new flag.
  - 25 September: Train World opens in Schaerbeek railway station.
  - 6 November: Jozef De Kesel is appointed Archbishop of Mechelen–Brussels.
  - 21–25 November: The Federal Government imposes a security lockdown, due to information about potential terrorist attacks in the wake of the November 2015 Paris attacks by ISIL on 13 November.
  - 11 December: Art & Design Atomium Museum opens.
  - 13 December: The Brussels S Train begins operating.

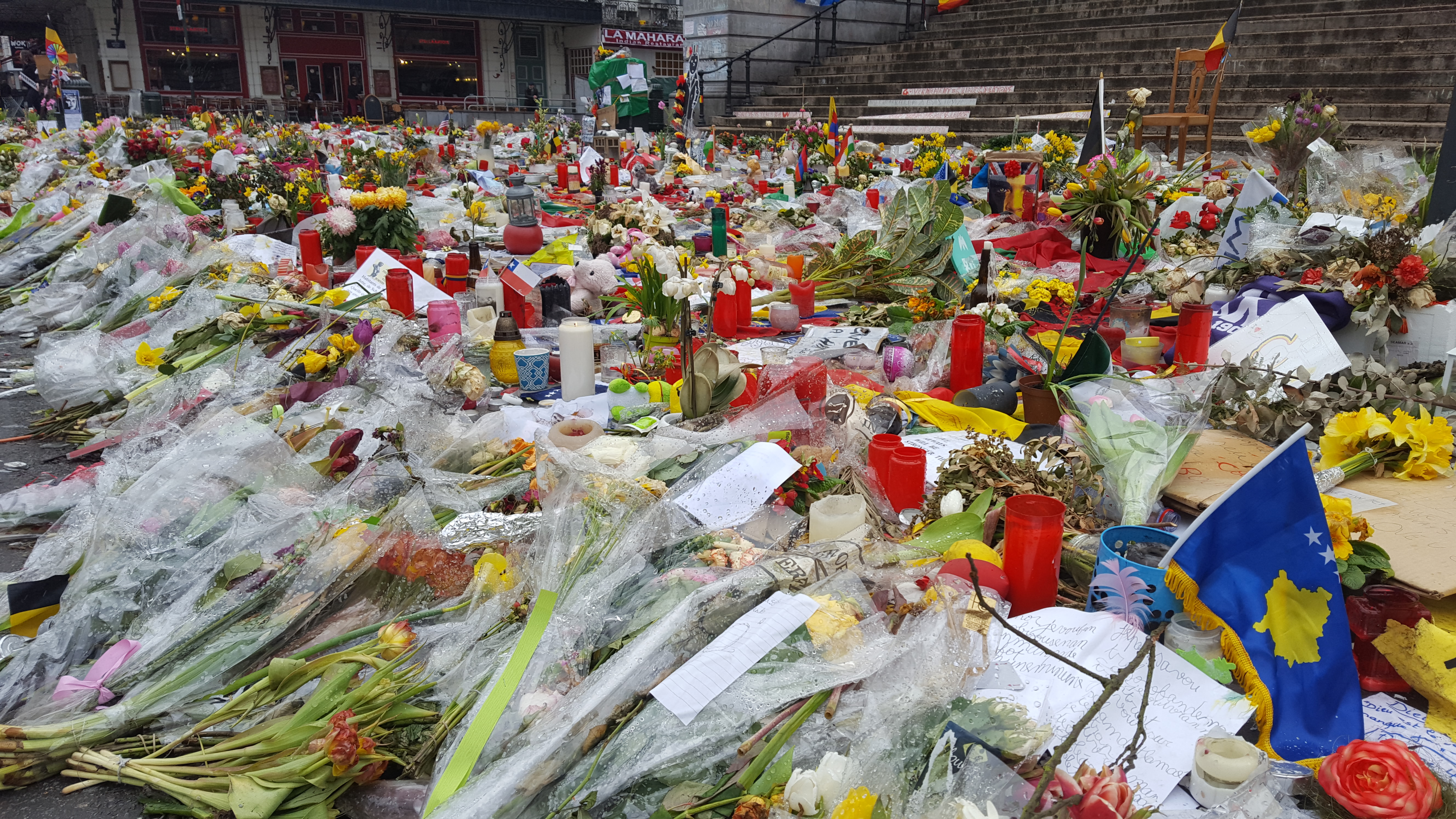
Makeshift memorial in front of the Bourse Palace following the 2016 Brussels bombings, 5 April 2016

- 2016
  - 8 March: The CIVA architectural centre is established.
  - 15–18 March: Police raids are conducted in connection to the attacks in Paris four months earlier.
  - 22 March: The Brussels bombings occur, killing 34 and injuring 230.
  - 4 April: The Schuman-Josaphat tunnel opens.
  - 15 April: The Millennium Iconoclast Museum of Art (MIMA) opens.
  - 5 October: The Brussels stabbing attacks occur, 4 injured including the suspect.
- 2017
  - Parts of the Sonian Forest becomes part of the transnational 'Ancient and Primeval Beech Forests of the Carpathians and Other Regions of Europe' UNESCO World Heritage Site.
  - 8 January: The Village, an open-air food court part of Bruparck closes to make way for the NEO project.
  - 6 May: The House of European History (HEH) opens.
  - 25 May: NATO's new headquarters open.
  - 31 May: The Samusocial scandal breaks in the Brussels Parliament.
  - 8 June: Yvan Mayor resigns as mayor following the Samusocial scandal.
  - 14 June: The fritkot culture is added to the Inventory of Intangible Cultural Heritage.
  - 9 June: Philippe Close is appointed mayor by the Government of the Brussels-Capital Region.
  - 20 June: The Brussels-Central bombing occurs, killing the perpetrator.
  - 25 August: The Brussels stabbing attack occurs, killing the perpetrator and injuring 2.
  - 6 October: The Meyboom is added to the Inventory of Intangible Cultural Heritage.
  - 7 December: 45,000 people gather in the city for Wake Up Europe! in support of Catalan independence.

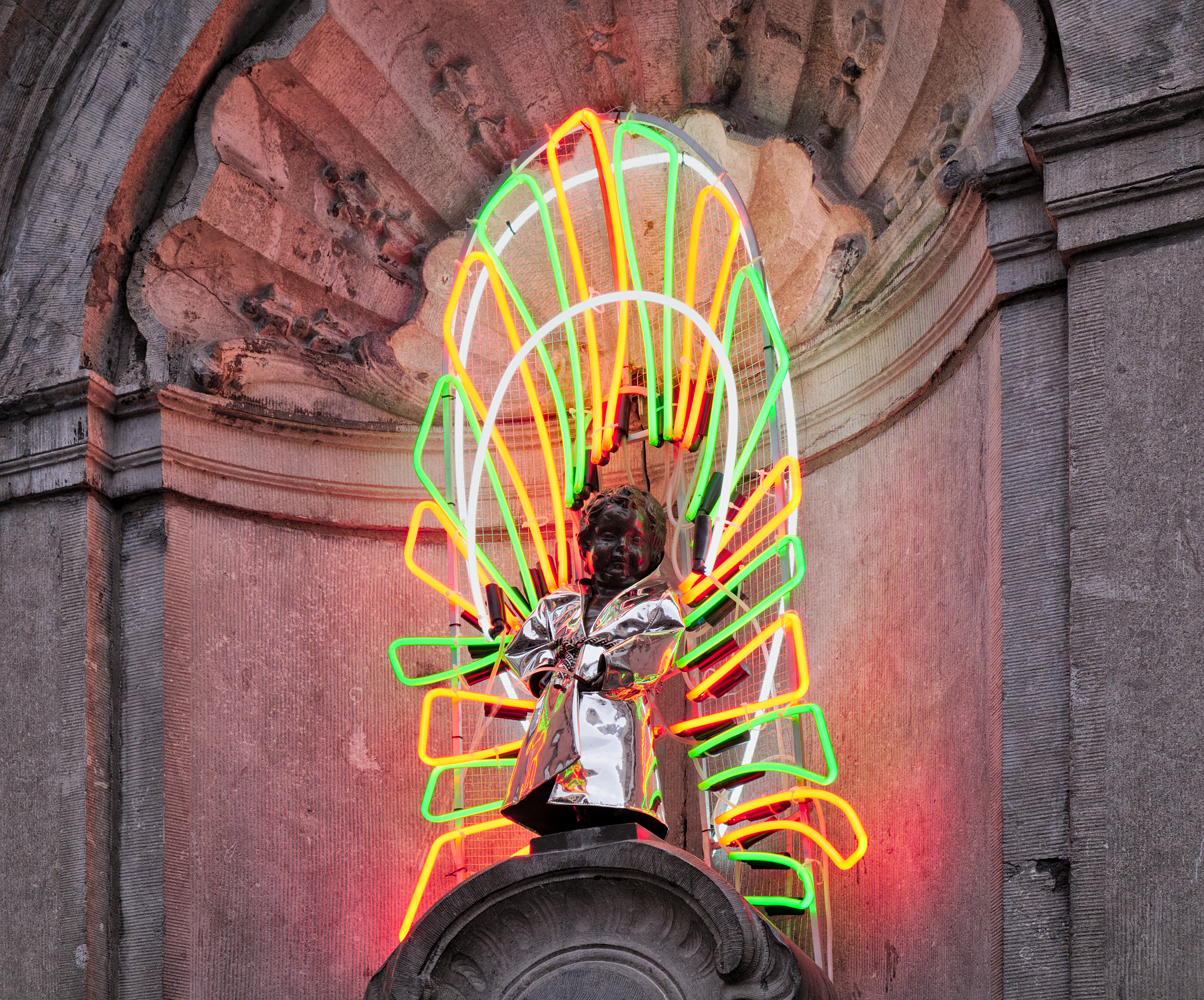
Manneken Pis in his 1000th costume, designed by Jean-Paul Lespagnard, 13 May 2018

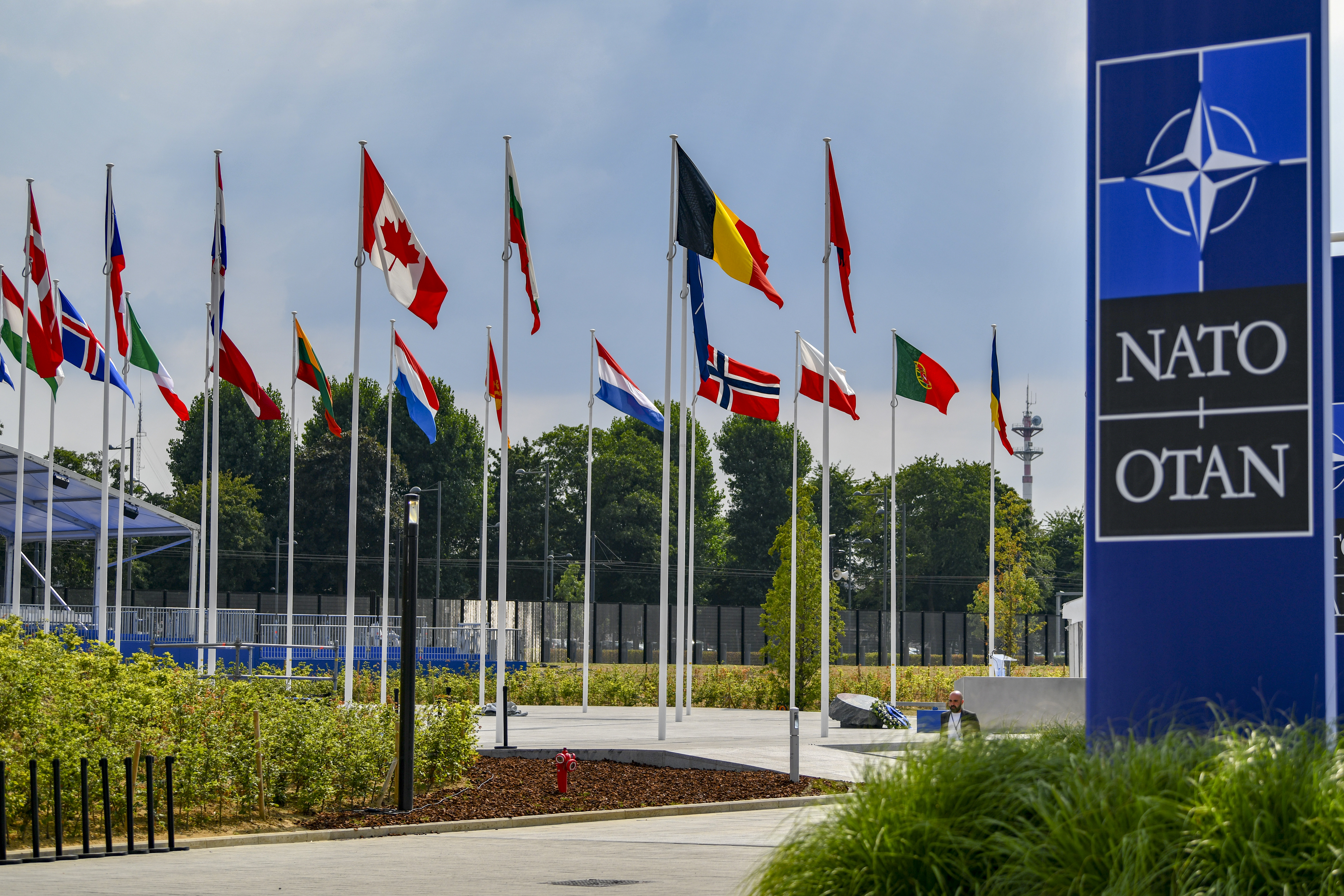
Flags of NATO member states wave at the entrance of NATO's headquarters in Haren, 12 July 2018

- 2018
  - 1 January: The entire Brussels-Capital Region is designated as a low-emission zone (LEZ), except for the Ring and the access roads to park and ride facilities.
  - 10 April: The Royal Theatre Toone is added to the Inventory of Intangible Cultural Heritage.
  - 5 May: KANAL – Centre Pompidou pre-opens in the former Citroën Garage.
  - 12 May: Manneken Pis receives his 1000th costume, created by fashion designer Jean-Paul Lespagnard.
  - 28 May: The giants of Watermael-Boitsfort: Mieke, Janneke and Tichke are added to the Inventory of Intangible Cultural Heritage.
  - 5 June: Nigerian sex worker Eunice Osayande is fatally stabbed by a client, leading to protests by migrant sex worker communities.
  - 20 June: The reestablished Brussels International Film Festival is held.
  - 2 December: The first School Strike for Climate occurs in the city, drawing 65,000 people to the streets.
  - 30 September: Océade, an waterpark part of Bruparck closes to make way for the NEO.
  - 14 October: Brussels municipal elections are held.
  - 20 November: The Brussels stabbing attack occurs, injuring 2 including the perpetrator.
- 2019
  - 21 January: The giants of Stockel are added to the Inventory of Intangible Cultural Heritage.
  - 1–5 May: The city celebrates 150 years of trams and 30 years of the Brussels-Capital Region with a historic tram procession and the European Tramdriver Championship.
  - 26 May: Brussels regional elections are held.
  - 6 July: The 2019 Tour de France starts in the city.
  - 1 August: Saint Verhaegen is added to the Inventory of Intangible Cultural Heritage.
  - 12 October: The MigratieMuseumMigration opens.
  - 11 December: The Ommegang is added to the Representative List of the Intangible Cultural Heritage of Humanity.
  - 14 December: Wolf Sharing Food Market opens in the former ASLK/CGER counter room, becoming the city's first food market.

== 2020–2029 ==
- 2020
  - The Iris Tower is built.
  - 2 February: The first recorded case of COVID-19 in Belgium after nine Belgian nationals living in Hubei, China, are repatriated.
  - 11 March: The first COVID-19 related death in Belgium is confirmed of a 90-year-old female patient who was being treated in Etterbeek.
  - 18 March: The city joins the rest of Belgium in a nationwide lockdown that lasts until 8 June in an attempt to reduce the number of cases.
  - 7 June: About 10,000 protesters gather as part of the George Floyd protests in Belgium.
  - 1 October: The Flower Carpet is added to the Inventory of Intangible Cultural Heritage.
  - 4 December: Speculoos is added to the Inventory of Intangible Cultural Heritage in response to Lotus Bakeries renaming it "Biscoff" in Belgium.

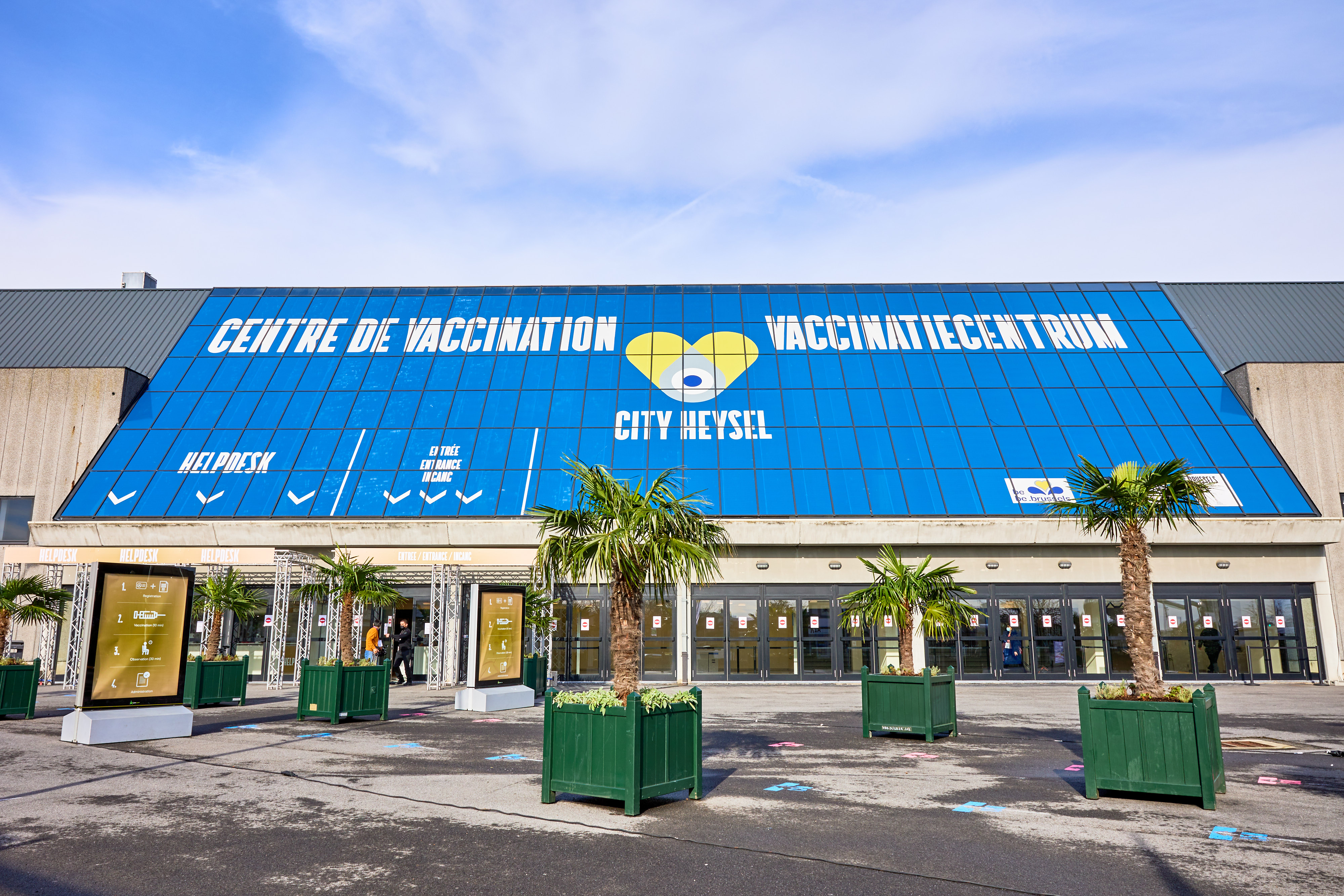
Exterior of a COVID-19 vaccination centre in Brussels, 16 February 2021

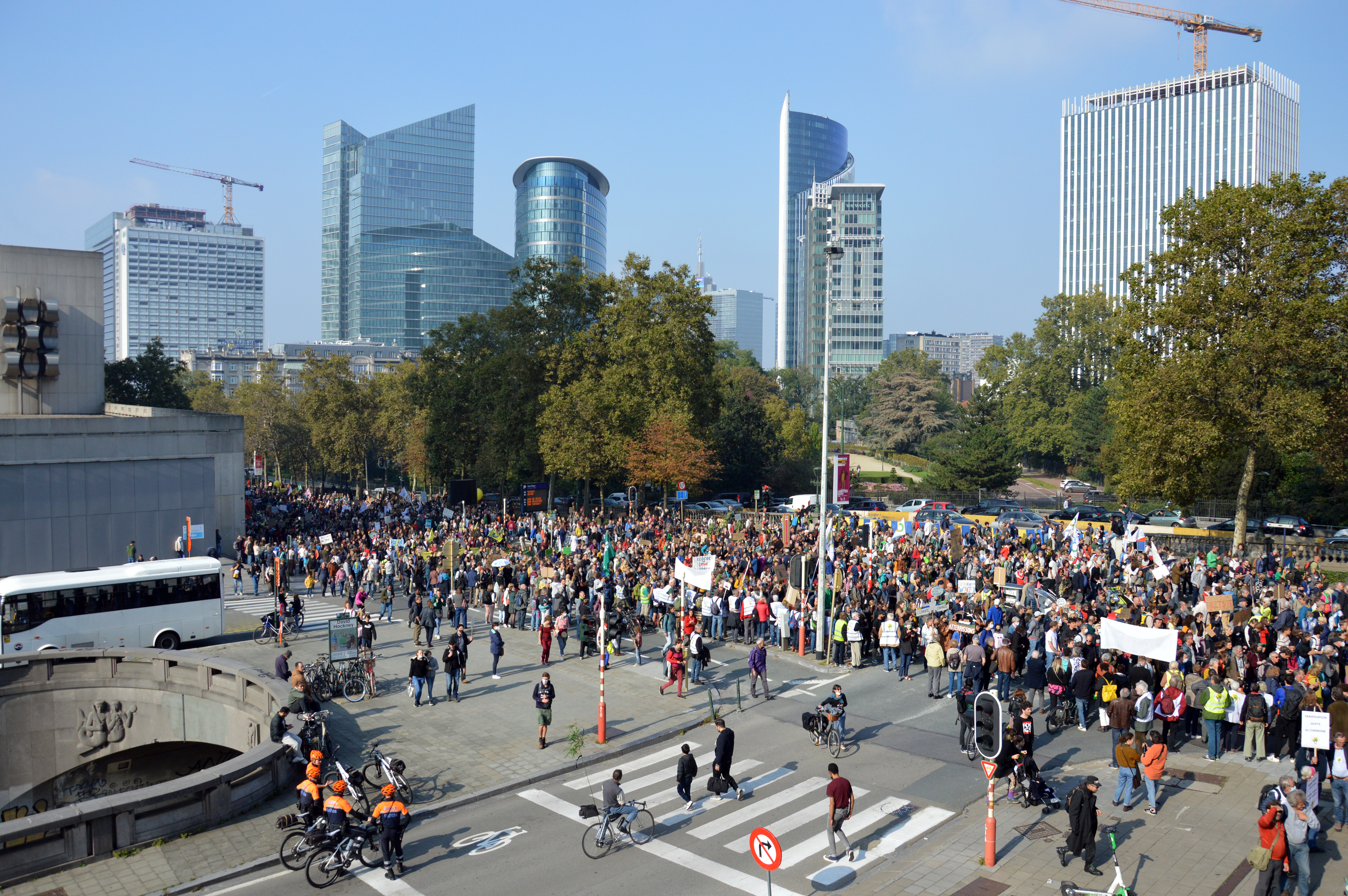
Demonstrators during the Back to the Climate protest in Brussels, 10 October 2021

- 2021
  - 14 January: Riots erupt following the death of Ibrahima Barrie in police custody.
  - 15 January: The living funfair culture is added to the Inventory of Intangible Cultural Heritage.
  - 26 February: The Bridge Productions is established as the first professional English theatre company in the city.
  - 15 March: The cultivation and forcing of chicory is added to the Inventory of Intangible Cultural Heritage.
  - 1 June: The Fanfare des Chasseurs de Prinkères is added to the Inventory of Intangible Cultural Heritage.
  - 10 October: The Back to the Climate protest occurs on the eve of COP26, with police reporting 25,000 participants and organisers claiming 50,000 to 70,000.
  - 15 December: The regional languages of Brussels and the zwanze are added to the Inventory of Intangible Cultural Heritage.
- 2022
  - 24 January: More than 50,000 people protest against COVID-19 rules.
  - 28 April: The MigratieMuseumMigration is awarded the European Heritage Label.
  - 20 June: Patrice Lumumba's children receive their father's remains during a ceremony at the Egmont Palace.
  - 10 July: The Uber Files are published, revealing that Uber extensively lobbied regional transport minister Pascal Smet.
  - 30 September: Haren Prison opens.
  - 4 October: The Suzan Daniel Bridge opens over the Brussels–Scheldt Maritime Canal.
  - 10 November: The Brussels stabbing occurs, killing 1 and injuring 2 including the perpetrator.
  - 5 December: The trial of the perpetrators of the 2016 Brussels bombings begins.
  - 9 December: Police raids related to Qatargate are conducted across the city, leading to arrests in Belgium and Italy.
- 2023
  - 12 January: The Fuse temporarily closes after Brussels Environment restricts its operations due to a noise complaint. In direct response, clubbing culture is added to the Inventory of Intangible Cultural Heritage a few months later.
  - 18 May: The Archives of the International Solvay Conferences on Physics and Chemistry are added to the Memory of the World International Register.
  - 3 September: Luc Terlinden is appointed Archbishop of Mechelen–Brussels.
  - 9 September: Belgian Beer World opens in the Bourse Palace, with the main hall accessible to the public for the first time.
  - 14 September: The Université Saint-Louis – Bruxelles becomes part of Université catholique de Louvain.
  - 16 October: The Brussels shooting occurs, killing 2 and injuring 1.
  - 17 October: The police fatally shoot Tunisian Abdesalem Lassoued, an Islamic State sympathizer in a café, who shot two Swedish tourists the previous day.
  - 18 December: The largest criminal trial in Belgian history begins in the city following the shutdown of Sky Global.

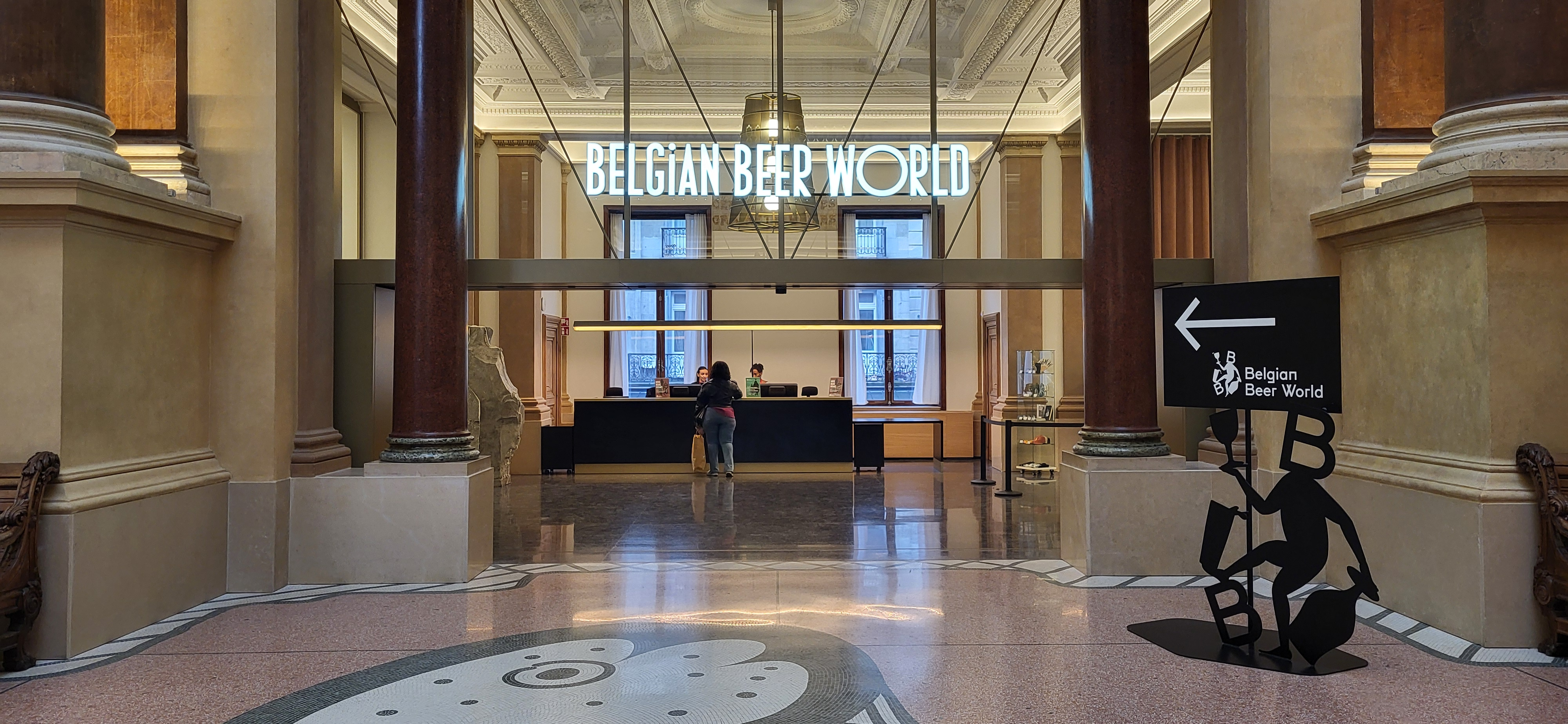
Entrance to Belgian Beer World in the Bourse Palace, 4 March 2024

- 2024
  - The Marc Sleen Museum closes and is integrated into the Belgian Comic Strip Center.
  - 1 February: The Monument to John Cockerill is vandalised during a farmers' protest in front of the European Parliament.
  - 16 April: The police shut down the right-wing National Conservatism Conference attended by Nigel Farage and expected to host Hungarian Prime Minister Viktor Orbán.
  - 17 April
    - The Council of State overturns the decision to shut down the National Conservatism Conference.
    - The Royal Theatre Toone is awarded the European Heritage Label.
  - 19 April: The Brussels-Capital Region declares itself an LGBTIQ+ Freedom Zone in response to the Polish LGBT-free zones and the LGBTQ+ propaganda ban in Nagykáta, Hungary.
  - 23 May: The art of comics is added to the Inventory of Intangible Cultural Heritage.
  - 9 June: Brussels regional elections are held.
  - 19 June: The city declines to host a UEFA Nations League match between Belgium and Israel over security concerns.
  - 13 September: The Brussels Pride is added to the Inventory of Intangible Cultural Heritage, becoming the second pride event recognised after Pride Amsterdam.
  - 23 September: Tram line 10 and 35 begin service taking over most of the route of line 3 which was disbanded.
  - 26–29 September: Pope Francis visits the city, presiding over a mass at King Baudouin Stadium, where he beatifies Anne of Jesus and announces the initiation of King Baudouin's beatification process.
  - 13 October: Brussels municipal elections are held.
  - 29 October: A court convicts 120 people on drugs charges and sentences them to up to 17 years imprisonment in the biggest drugs-related trial in the country.
  - 6 November: The Pride Museum is established.
  - 19 November: An investigation by Pano uncovers fraud and clientelism within the Public Centre for Social Welfare of Anderlecht; The elections in Saint-Josse-ten-Noode are declared invalid by the Judicial Council of the Brussels Regional Parliament.
- 2025
  - 5 February: The first in a series of shootings linked to drug trafficking occurs at Clemenceau metro station, prompting the closure of several metro lines for a few hours.
  - 7 February: Following four shootings in the span of a few days, the six separate police zones in the city temporarily start working under one command.
  - 9 February: Emir Kir is re-elected mayor in Saint-Josse-ten-Noode after the previous elections were declared invalid.
  - 13 February: Close to 100,000 people take part in protests and a strike against plans by the De Wever government to reduce public services.
  - 21 February: David Leisterh resigns as formateur, marking the first time this has happened since the region's creation.
  - 28 February: Audi Brussels shuts down after failing to find a buyer.
  - 11 April: The archive of the Société des Bollandistes is added to the Memory of the World International Register.
  - 22 April: The City of Brussels declares itself an anti-fascist city in commemoration of the signing of the German Instrument of Surrender, which marks the end of the Second World War.
  - May: The tradition and craftsmanship of chocolate is added to the Inventory of Intangible Cultural Heritage.
  - 4 May: Clashes occur in several districts during a Belgian Cup football match between Club Brugge KV and R.S.C. Anderlecht at the King Baudouin Stadium.
  - 5 May: A demonstration is held in to condemn the previous day's violence and the lack of police presence in Molenbeek. It escalates into clashes with police, causing more damage and leading to further arrests.
  - 11 May: On the 77th anniversary of the Nakba, between 20,000 and 80,000 demonstrators gather to call for a ceasefire in Palestine.
  - 15 May: A magneteer retrieves a WWI shell from the Brussels Canal. Laeken Park is briefly evacuated for a controlled explosion.
  - 2 June: Fabian, an 11-year-old boy, is killed in Elisabeth Park after being struck by a police car during a chase while he was riding his scooter.
  - 7 September: Between 70,000 and 110,000 people take part in a demonstration in support for Palestinians and against Israeli violence in the Gaza Strip.
  - 9 December: The city's rod marionette tradition is added to the Representative List of the Intangible Cultural Heritage of Humanity.
- 2026
  - 12 February: The Brussels-Capital Region forms a government 613 days after the elections.
  - 14 February: Boris Dilliès becomes Minister-President of the Brussels-Capital Region.
  - 20 May: An investigation by Pano uncovers alleged corruption involving the Foyer Anderlechtois/Anderlechtse Haard social housing association.
- 2026 – Projected
  - 28 November: KANAL - Centre Pompidou will reopen in the former Citroën Garage after extensive renovations.
- 2027 – Projected
  - 1 January: The city's police zones will merge into one zone led by one chief of police.

== See also ==
- Timeline of Brussels
- History of Brussels
