= Terrorist activity in Belgium =

This article covers attacks and activity of terrorism in Belgium.

== Islamic terrorism ==
In the 1990s Belgium was a transit country for Islamist terrorist groups like the Armed Islamic Group of Algeria (GIA) and the Moroccan Islamic Combatant Group (GICM).

Belgium has a population of 11 million including large numbers of immigrants from Muslim countries. 100,000 Moroccan citizens live in Belgium, often descended from Moroccans recruited to work in the mining industry in the 1960s; a small fraction of the children and grandchildren of the immigrant generation have been attracted to Militant Islamism and Jihad. A tiny fraction of this large Muslim population has participated in terrorist attacks. In a report by the Combating Terrorism Center, of the 135 individuals surveyed in connection with terrorism, there were 12 different nationalities. Of those 65% had Belgian citizenship and 33% were either Moroccan citizens or had ancestral roots there.

In 2016, Belgian researcher estimated that about 562 individuals had travelled to become foreign fighters in the Syrian and Iraqi Civil Wars, the majority of whom joined the Islamic State with others joining the al-Qaida-affiliated group Al-Nusra Front. The majority of those who went to the Syria in the 2012-2016 time span were of Moroccan descent according to U.S. and Belgian authorities.

Belgium has been the base of operations for a number of terrorist attacks in the 2010s, including the November 2015 Paris attacks. It has also been the place where some Islamist militants developed militant views before going to the Middle East to fight with ISIS.

In June 2016, with 451 fighters having travelled to join the Syrian Civil War, Belgium had the highest number of foreign fighters per capita.

The November 2015 Paris attacks in France were coordinated and planned from Belgium. The overall leader of that terrorist cell was believed to be Mohamed Belkaid, an Islamic State operative from Algeria who previously had lived in Sweden. Belkaid was killed in a shootout in the Foret district of Brussels, during which Belkaid was firing on police to allow Salah Abdeslam to escape. Salah Abdeslam was arrested a few days later and the surviving members of the cell, including brothers Najim Laachraoui and Khalid and Ibrahim Bakraoui (previously armed robbers) launched the 2016 Brussels bombings targeting Brussels airport and metro killing 32.

Terrorism experts regard Islamic State activities in Europe's Francophone area as a single, French-Belgian junction of ISIS activity and attacks.

== List of terrorist incidents ==
=== Attacks related to Middle East politics ===
1985

- 1 August 1985: Silco incident. Kidnapping of Belgian-French family by the government of Libya; they were held for almost five years.

=== Attacks related to Northern Ireland ===
1979

- 22 March 1979: A Belgian bank employee was shot by the Provisional IRA, who thought it was Sir John Killick.
- 25 June 1979: An IRA bomb in Brussels targeted but failed to hit a British general.
- 6 July 1979: An IRA bomb detonates in a British consulate building in Antwerp.
- 29 August 1979: 1979 Brussels bombing. The IRA bombs the central square of Brussels whilst targeting British troops, injuring 15.
- 3 November 1979: The British consulate in Antwerp is bombed by the Irish National Liberation Army (INLA).
- 3 December 1980 - There was an assassination attempt on the then British European Commissioner Christopher Tugendhat who was living in Belgium at the time, when a passing car fired at him but missed just after he left his Brussels home. The PIRA later claimed responsibility for the attack.
- 12 August 1988 - A British Army Sergeant-Major Richard Heakin was shot dead by the Provisional IRA in Ostend, Belgium.
- 10 December 1989 - Two members from the Irish Republican & Socialist paramilitary the Irish People's Liberation Organization (IPLO) shot and injured a gendarme in the Belgian port of Antwerp and escaped on foot. They had been intending to smuggle a small consignment of arms aboard a freighter bound for Ireland. Afterwards, Dutch police carried out raids on four homes and arrested an Irish citizen in Amsterdam.

=== Antisemitic attacks ===
1980

- 28 July 1980: 1980 Antwerp summer camp attack. A Syria-born Palestinian, Said Al Nasr, used grenades to attack a group of 40 Jewish children waiting with their families for a bus to take them to summer camp. The explosion killed one boy, identified as 15-year-old Parisian David Kuhan, and wounded 20, aged 13 to 27, eight of whom had to be hospitalized.

1981

- 20 October 1981: 1981 Antwerp synagogue bombing. The Black September Organization carried out a bombing attack at the Antwerp synagogue. Three people were killed in the attack, while 103 others were injured.

=== Far-left attacks ===
1985

- 20 April 1985: A bomb exploded in the secretariat of the North Atlantic Assembly, which the Revolutionary Front for Proletarian Action (FRAP) claimed responsibility for via Belgian radio.
- 21 April 1985: A bomb exploded in the AEG Telefunken building in Brussels, blowing out several windows in the AEG Telefunken building and its neighboring structure. The attack was attributed to FRAP after the organisation's acronym was found spray painted on the site.
- 1 May 1985: A car bomb exploded in front of the Federation of Belgian Enterprises building in Brussels. Two firemen were killed when trying to extinguish a fire that the Communist Combatant Cells (CCC) deliberately set on the car, with 13 other people injured.

=== Islamist attacks ===
2014

- 24 May 2014: Jewish Museum of Belgium shooting. ISIS directed attack on the Jewish Museum of Belgium in Brussels by a French national in contact with ISIS.

2016

- 22 March 2016: 2016 Brussels bombings. Two ISIS suicide bombings occurred at Brussels Airport in Zaventem, and one at Maalbeek metro station in central Brussels. Thirty-two civilians and three perpetrators were killed, and more than 300 people were injured. Another bomb was found during a search of the airport. Islamic State of Iraq and the Levant (ISIL) claimed responsibility for the attacks.
- 6 August 2016: 2016 stabbing of Charleroi police officers. ISIS claimed responsibility for an attack on Belgian police officers by an Algerian national who had been scheduled for deportation.
- 5 October 2016: 2016 stabbing of Brussels police officers ISIS-inspired lone wolf stabbing of three police officers in Brussels.

2017

- 20 June 2017: an explosion occurred in the Brussels Central train station, a failed bombing attempt by Moroccan lone actor Oussama Zariouh.
- 25 August 2017: Two soldiers were lightly wounded after a machete-wielding man attacked them in Brussels close to the Grand-Place. The perpetrator was shot dead at the scene, and the surrounding area was promptly evacuated.

2018

- 29 May 2018: 2018 Liège attack. A prisoner left prison, stabbed two female police officers, took their guns, shot and killed them and a civilian in Liège, Belgium. ISIS later claimed responsibility for the attack done by a soldier of the caliphate.

2022

- 10 November 2022: 2022 Brussels stabbing. A police officer was killed together while another officer were injured in a stabbing attack in Brussels. The perpetrator was shot and injured and later brought to the hospital.

2023

- 16 October 2023: A shooting occurred in central Brussels before a match between Belgium and Sweden at the King Baudouin Stadium. Two Swedish nationals were shot and killed and one severely wounded. According to several sources, it has been reported that the shooter was working on the behalf of ISIS. The suspected gunman was killed by the police after an all-night manhunt.
