= Brussels attack =

Brussels attack may refer to:

- The 1979 Brussels bombing, by the Provisional Irish Republican Army on British soldiers
- The 2016 Brussels bombings, by Islamic State
- The 2016 Brussels stabbing attacks
- The 2017 Brussels-Central bombing
- The 2017 Brussels stabbing attack
- The 2018 Brussels stabbing attack
- The 2023 Brussels shooting
