= 2023 Brussels shooting =

Islamist terrorist attack in Belgium

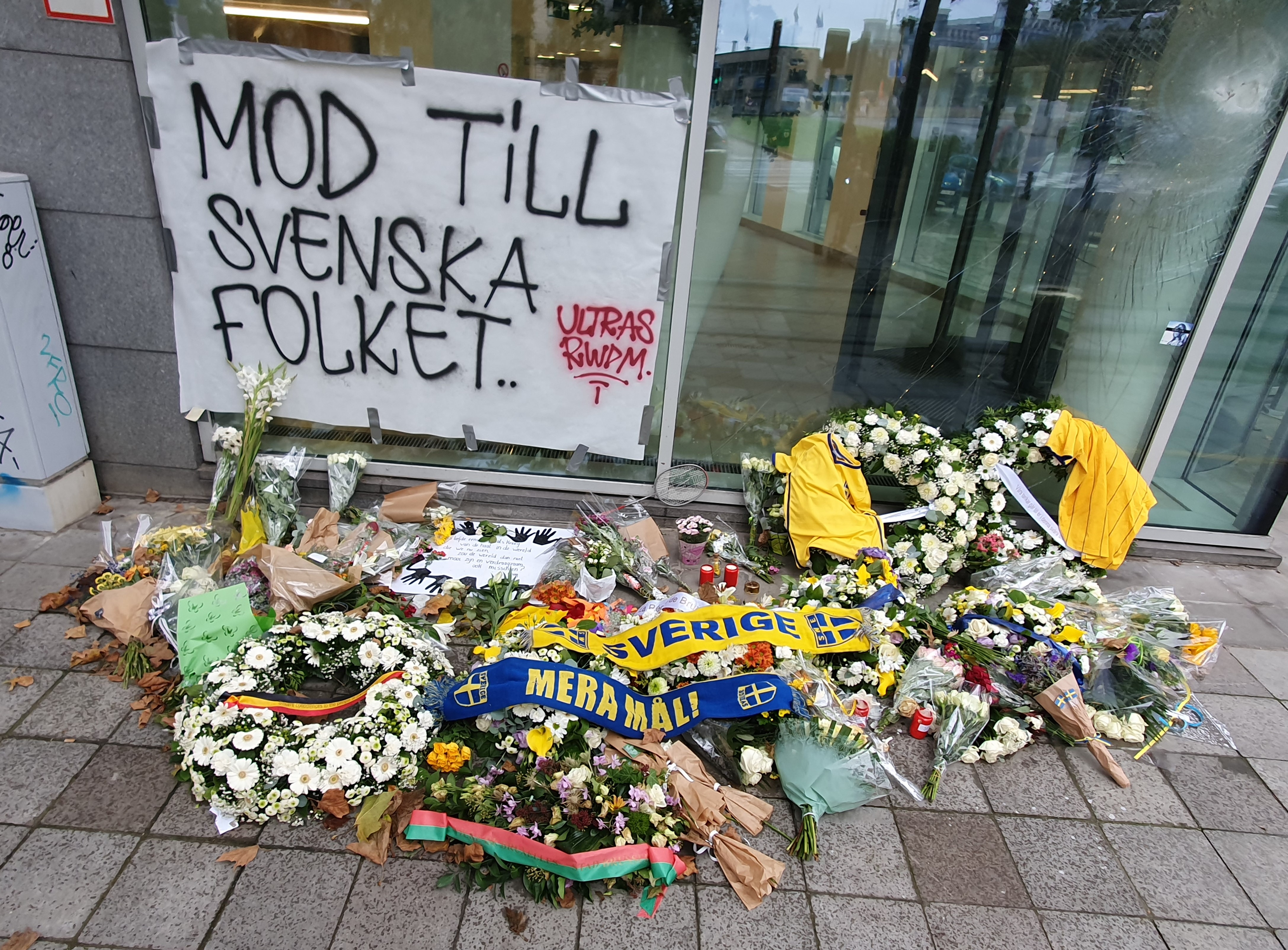
- Temporary memorial for the Swedish football supporters at the site of the attack, with notice saying "courage to the Swedish people"
- Location: 50°51′29″N 4°20′47″E; Brussels, Belgium
- Date: 16 October 2023; 19:15 CEST (UTC+2)
- Target: Swedes
- Attack type: Shooting
- Weapon: AR-15–style rifle
- Deaths: 3 (including the perpetrator (Note: Killed by police the morning after the attack))
- Injuries: 1
- Perpetrator: Abdesalem Lassoued
- Motive: Islamic extremism; Revenge for the 2023 Quran burnings in Sweden

The 2023 Brussels shooting was an Islamist terrorist attack carried out at about 19:15 (CEST) on 16 October when Abdesalem Lassoued, a 45-year-old Tunisian living illegally in Brussels, Belgium, opened fire on Swedish football supporters at the intersection of two boulevards just off the Square Sainctelette, leaving two dead and one injured. The victims were on their way to a football match at the King Baudouin Stadium.

Lassoued fled the scene, and soon after a video was posted on social media in which he claimed responsibility for the attack. The Belgian federal prosecutor immediately concentrated its investigation on a terrorist motive. The following morning, Lassoued was tracked down to a café in the Schaerbeek municipality where he was shot by Belgian police and died on the way to hospital. Following the attack, the terror threat level for Brussels was raised from 2 to 4, the highest level. In the rest of Belgium, it was raised from level 2 to 3. After Lassoued's death, Brussels was lowered to level 3, the same as the rest of the country.

Four days after the attack, Belgian Justice Minister Vincent Van Quickenborne resigned after it emerged that an extradition request by Tunisia for Lassoued in August 2022 had not been followed up by Belgian magistrates.

== Background ==
The attack was the fifth fatal Islamist terrorist attack carried out in Belgium since 2014, after the Jewish Museum of Belgium shooting in 2014, the 2016 Brussels bombings, the 2018 Liège attack, and the knife attack in Schaerbeek in 2022. In addition, there were two attacks in Brussels in which no victims died: a failed bombing in 2017, and a knife attack in 2017.

The Islamic State terror cell which planned and carried out both the November 2015 Paris attacks and the 2016 Brussels bombings was based in Brussels.

== Attack ==
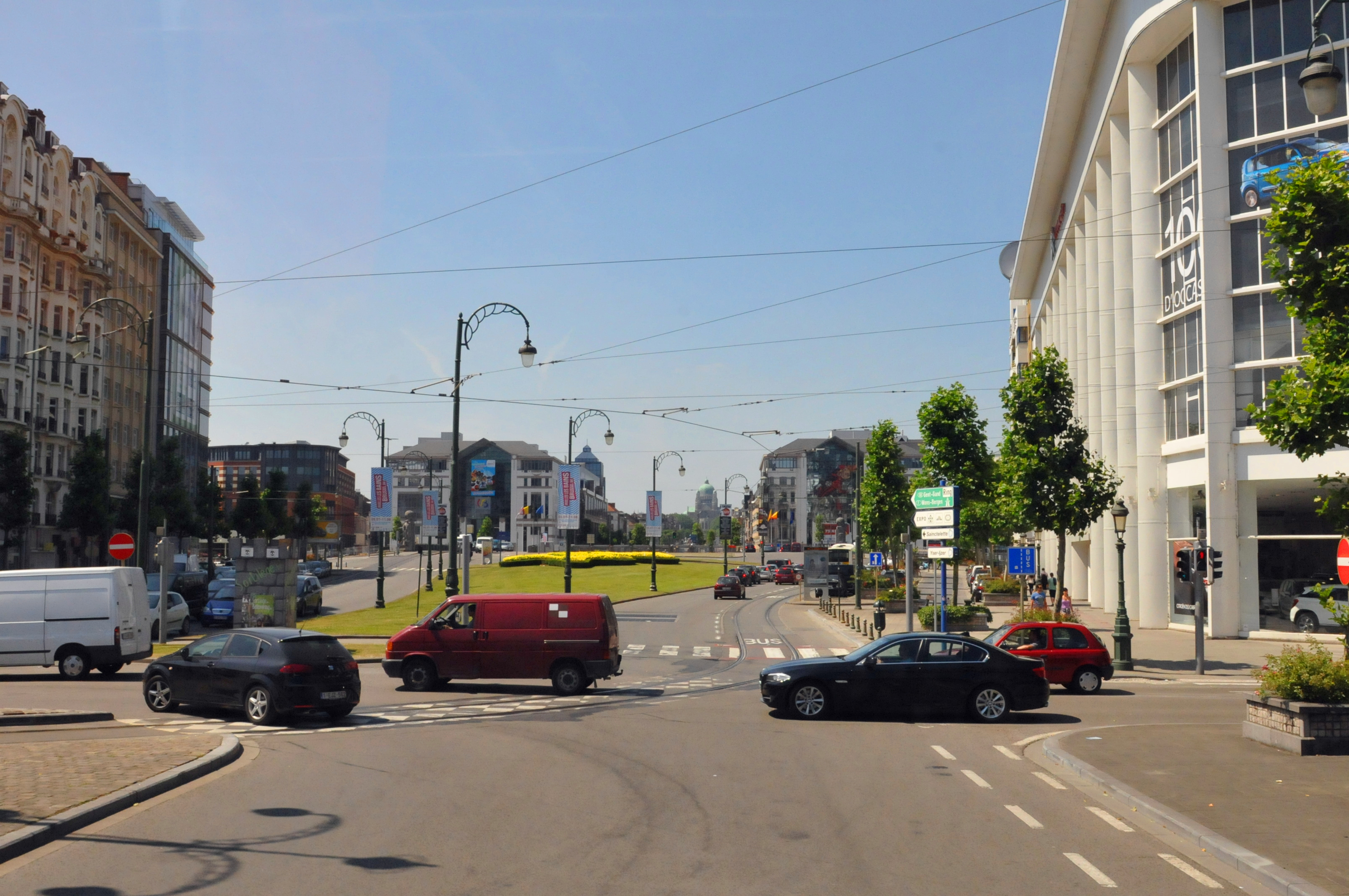
A view of the Square Sainctelette in Brussels. The attack took place outside and in the lobby of the glass-cladded building in the upper left-hand corner.

At about 19:15 CEST on 16 October 2023, Lassoued opened fire on Swedish football supporters in a taxi at the junction of the Boulevard du Neuvième de Ligne/Negende Linielaan and the Boulevard d'Ypres/Ieperlaan, just off the Square Sainctelette, in the City of Brussels. The supporters were on their way to the King Baudouin Stadium, about 5 km (3 mi) away, where the UEFA Euro 2024 qualifier between Belgium and Sweden was being played. One victim was shot in the taxi, while the other was shot as he ran into the foyer of an office building. A third Swedish football supporter was also shot and was left in a serious, but not life-threatening, condition. The gunman, who was wearing a fluorescent orange jacket, then fled the scene on a motorcycle.

The football match, which had started at 8:45 pm, was called off at half-time as news of the attack spread. The Swedish players said they did not want to play the second half of the match and the Belgium team agreed. The 35,000 spectators were held in the stadium before being evacuated a little before midnight, with the Swedish fans being the last to leave. Swedish fans were reported to have removed their supporter's gear to avoid being identified as Swedish. The Swedish Ministry of Foreign Affairs advised Swedes in Brussels to be vigilant.

Soon after the attack a video of a man speaking Arabic and claiming responsibility for the shooting was circulating on social media. The man said he was inspired by the Islamic State. A spokesman for the Belgian federal prosecutor's office said that the investigation was concentrating on a terrorist motive, with Swedish nationals having been targeted, possibly on account of the recent Quran burnings in Sweden. The attacker was identified as Lassoued.

As a result of the attack, the terror threat level for Brussels was raised from 2 to 4, the highest level, and raised from 2 to 3, the second-highest level, in the rest of the country.

=== Perpetrator's death ===
Police traced Lassoued to his address in Schaerbeek through the registration of his motorcycle. That evening two officers saw him sitting in a park opposite his flat (having been thrown out with a bag of belongings by his partner) but did not apprehend him. The following morning, police received a tip-off that Lassoued was in a café close to where he lived. During the arrest, he was shot in the chest by police. Paramedics tried to resuscitate him and took him to hospital, where he was pronounced dead. His death was confirmed by Belgian Interior Minister Annelies Verlinden on the social media platform X. The weapon used in the attack (an AR-15 semi-automatic rifle) was found in his possession, as was his bag of belongings. After his death, the terror threat level for Brussels was lowered to 3, the same as the rest of Belgium.

=== Victims ===
The three victims were all Swedish football supporters who had travelled to Belgium to watch their national team play in the Euro 2024 qualifier. The two men who died were 60-year-old Patrick Lundström who lived in Switzerland, and 70-year-old Kent Persson who lived in Stockholm. The injured victim was a man in his 70s.

== Investigation ==
=== Perpetrator's background ===
Abdesalem Lassoued (1 September 1978 – 17 October 2023) was sentenced in Tunisia in 2005 to more than 26 years in prison for crimes including attempted murder. He escaped from prison in 2011 and entered Europe via Lampedusa, an Italian island in the Mediterranean Sea, making the journey on a small boat with other migrants. In the decade following his arrival in Europe, he is known to have sought asylum in Belgium, Italy, Norway and Sweden, all of which rejected his claims. Living under a false identity in Sweden, he was arrested for drug-related offences in 2012 and was deported back to Italy after serving a two-year prison sentence. From Italy, where he had been identified as radicalised, he travelled to Belgium and applied for asylum in 2019. His claim was rejected in 2020 and he remained in Belgium illegally, in spite of a request from Tunisia for his extradition. He had been flagged by Belgian authorities for potential extremism and an unidentified foreign intelligence service had also issued a warning about him in 2016. After having threatened another Tunisian man at an asylum centre, Lassoued had been due to be questioned by the Belgian authorities on 17 October.

After the death of Lassoued, the federal prosecutor told reporters that he was thought to have been acting as a lone wolf rather than as a member of a terrorist group. On the evening of 17 October, the Islamic State claimed responsibility for the attack through their Amaq News Agency. According to the Combating Terrorism Center, this was the first time the Islamic State claimed responsibility for an attack in Europe since the one in Vienna in 2020.

=== Motive ===
Belgian authorities said that the killer had targeted Swedish people, possibly in revenge for the 2023 Quran burnings in Sweden. The victims were wearing Sweden men's national football team shirts when they were shot. In a video released after the attack, the perpetrator claimed to have been inspired by the Islamic State. Lassoued had followed an account on the social media application TikTok that spread conspiracy theories about Muslim children being kidnapped by the Swedish social authorities.

== Reactions ==
- Sweden - Prime Minister Ulf Kristersson said his thoughts were with the families of the victims and with the injured person. He accepted an invitation from Belgian Prime Minister Alexander De Croo to attend a memorial ceremony for the victims on 18 October.
  - Justice Minister Gunnar Strömmer called the attacks "terrible news".
  - King Carl XVI Gustaf said he and his family were thinking of the victims and their relatives.
- Belgium - Prime Minister Alexander De Croo sent his condolences to the Swedish Prime Minister and said "Our thoughts are with the families and friends who lost their loved ones. As close partners the fight against terrorism is a joint one."
- Denmark - Prime Minister Mette Frederiksen sent her condolences on the evening of the attack.
  - Foreign Minister Lars Løkke Rasmussen sent his condolences, expressed solidarity with Sweden and Belgium and stated "In the face of terrorism and violence, we will stand united".
- France - President Emmanuel Macron, who was visiting Albania at the time, said that Europe had been shaken, while the interior minister ordered tighter border controls with Belgium.
- EU - President of the European Commission Ursula von der Leyen sent her condolences to the families and friends of the victims of the terror attack. She vowed to take action against online hate speech, and to strengthen the power of member states to deport people who were considered a national security threat.

== Aftermath ==
Two days after the attack, the Swedish and Belgian Prime Ministers attended a brief ceremony for the victims, laying wreaths at the site of the attack. On 19 October, UEFA announced that the European Championship qualifying game between Belgium and Sweden would not be replayed, with the 1–1 half-time score treated as the final score. Both national football associations approved the decision as it had no impact on which teams qualified from Group F.

On 20 October, the Belgian government announced that the attack was officially classed as terrorism. Later that day Belgian Justice Minister Vincent Van Quickenborne resigned after it emerged that an extradition request by Tunisia for Lassoued in August 2022 had not been followed up by Belgian magistrates.

On 24 October, two men living in Paris were charged with terrorist-related offences in connection with the attack. Two days later a man in Brussels suspected of helping Lassoued obtain his firearm was charged with terrorist-related murder and attempted murder and involvement in a terrorist organisation. On 27 October, a man was arrested in Málaga, Spain, on suspicion of involvement in "activities linked to organised crime" along with Lassoued.

== See also ==
- List of terrorist incidents in 2023
- List of terrorist incidents linked to the Islamic State
- Terrorist activity in Belgium
- 2023 Quran burnings in Sweden
