= 2011 Liège attack =

Murder–suicide in Liège, Belgium

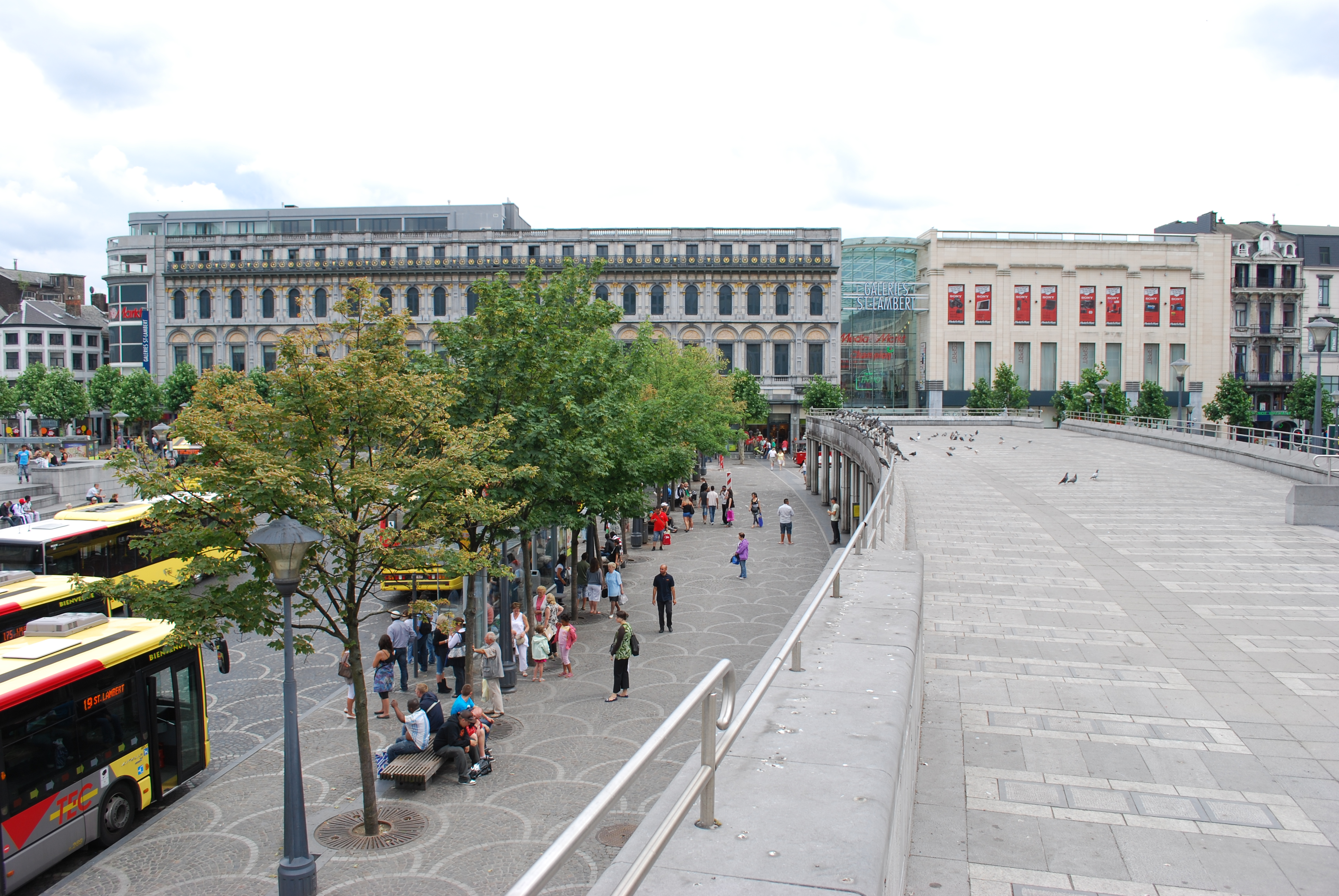
- The bus shelter on the Place Saint-Lambert, Liège; the killer was standing and killed himself on the platform on the right.
- Location: 50°38′42″N 05°34′22″E; Liège, Belgium
- Date: Tuesday, 13 December 2011; 12:34–12:40 (CET) (UTC+01:00)
- Target: Civilians
- Attack type: Mass shooting, murder–suicide
- Weapons: FN FAL battle rifle; Smith & Wesson Model 57 revolver; Four M84 stun grenades
- Deaths: 7 (including the perpetrator and 1 before the attack)
- Injuries: 147
- Perpetrator: Nordine Amrani

On 13 December 2011, a murder–suicide attack took place in the city of Liège in the Wallonia region of Belgium.

The attacker, 33-year-old Nordine Amrani, threw grenades and fired an FN FAL rifle at civilians on the Place Saint-Lambert, the city's main square. The attack killed five and left 147 others injured, seven seriously. Amrani then killed himself with a revolver. Earlier that day, he had also murdered a woman in his house.

The attack occurred on the same day and at the same hour as the 2011 Florence shootings. There is no indication that the attacks were coordinated.

== Attack ==
The attack took place on 13 December 2011, at 12:33 local time (11:33 UTC) in the Place Saint-Lambert, the centre of commercial life in Liège, home of the town's courthouse. It was a busy day with many shoppers in the nearby Christmas market.

Witnesses reported four explosions and gunfire. At first, it was believed that there were two or more assailants, who threw stun grenades into the courthouse and at a bus shelter. The gunman then fired shots with a 7.62×51mm NATO FN FAL from the rooftop of a bakery shop, located across the square. Police were on the scene quickly and sealed off the square.

Amrani killed five people in the attack and wounded 147 others, seven seriously. After that, Amrani killed himself with a Smith & Wesson M57 .41 Magnum revolver. Two of the dead were teenage boys aged 15 and 17. A 17-month-old boy died later in a hospital. A 75-year-old woman died from her injuries two days after the attack. A fifth victim, who had been in an induced coma since the attack, died of head injuries on 23 December.

=== Victims ===
- Antonietta Racano, 45, died at Amrani's apartment on 13 December
- Mehdi Belhadj, 15, died at Saint-Lambert Square on 13 December
- Pierre Gérouville, 17, died at Saint-Lambert Square on 13 December
- Gabriël Leblond, 1, died at a hospital on 13 December
- Claudette Putzeys, 75, died at a hospital on 15 December
- Laurent Kremer, 20, died at a hospital on 23 December

== Perpetrator ==
Nordine Amrani

Nordine Amrani (15 November 1978 – 13 December 2011) was born in Ixelles/Elsene in Brussels, Belgium. He was a French-speaking Belgian of Moroccan origin and a welder by trade. According to Amrani's lawyer, he could not speak Arabic nor was he Muslim. Amrani was known to have an interest in guns, with a history of convictions for possession of weapons.

He grew up near Brussels, and was living with his fiancée, a home care nurse. Orphaned young, he was raised in foster homes.

Amrani had been released from prison in October 2010. He had been sentenced to 58 months (4 years, 10 months) from a Liège court in 2008. The conviction was for possession of thousands of weapons parts, almost 10,000 rounds of ammunition, dozens of weapons, including a rocket launcher, assault and sniper rifles, as well as 2,800 cannabis plants, in the context of a criminal conspiracy (association de malfaiteurs). He also had convictions for handling stolen goods and sex offences but had no known links to terror groups. On the day of the attack, Amrani had been summoned for an interview with the police to answer questions about a sexual abuse case.

Before the attack, Amrani transferred money from his account to that of his girlfriend. On the morning of the attack, Amrani killed a 45-year-old woman in his apartment. The victim was working as a cleaner for Amrani's neighbour. He possibly lured her into his flat under the pretext of offering her work. After the murder, he hid her body in his shed, then left his flat for the city centre, equipped with a backpack containing the weapons.

== Reaction ==
=== Domestic ===
Recently appointed Prime Minister of Belgium Elio Di Rupo visited the location of the attack later in the day and described the attack as "horrible". He added, "The whole country shares the pain of the families affected. We share the shock of the population." Albert II, King of the Belgians, was shocked and visited Liège on the same day, along with Queen Paola. They were received by the Governor, the Prime Minister and the Lord Mayor of Liège. Prince Philippe, the Duke of Brabant, honoured the victims in a public ceremony later. In the Chamber of Representatives of Belgium a minute of silence was held in honour of the victims.

Willy Demeyer, the mayor of Liège, condemned the attack and said the attack had "sown sorrow in the heart of the city".

=== International ===
Condolences were expressed by the governments of Australia, Estonia, Latvia, Lithuania, Luxembourg, Singapore and the United Kingdom.

== See also ==
- Brussels bombings
- January 2015 anti-terrorism operations in Belgium
- 2018 Liège attack
