= Maria Kisito =

Rwandan Benedictine nun and criminal

Sister Maria Kisito, born Julienne Mukabutera (born 22 June 1964) is a Rwandan Benedictine nun who was convicted and sentenced to twelve years for her active role in the deaths of an estimated 5,000 to 7,000 people who sought refuge at their convent in southern Rwanda during the Rwandan genocide.

Her mother superior, Gertrude Mukangango, received a fifteen-year prison sentence. The prosecution had requested life sentences for both women and two men who were on trial with them. Witnesses had observed that the two nuns actively directed Rwandan death squadrons to their refuge and even supplied gasoline to burn down the building with the civilians inside. After serving half of her twelve-year sentence in a Belgian prison, Kisito was released in June 2007.

== Testimony from the trial ==
On 22 April 1994, Séraphine Mukamana had hidden herself in a garage when a militia attacked a convent in Sovu in southern Rwanda. "We sought refuge in the garage and closed and barricaded the doors. Outside, a bloodbath is going on. Suddenly, an orphan begins to weep as it gets too hot in the garage. At once, the killers approach the garage." As the refugees refuse to come out, the militia leader, Emmanuel Rekeraho, decides to burn them alive in the garage. "'The nuns are coming to help us. They are bringing gasoline,' I heard [Rekeraho] say. Looking through a hole that the militiamen, meanwhile, had made in the wall, I indeed saw Sister Gertrude and Sister Kisito. The latter was carrying a petrol can. Shortly after that, the garage is set on fire."

== See also ==
- Butare Four
