= 2022 Brussels stabbing =

2022 stabbing attack

- Location: Rue d'Aerschot, Schaerbeek, Brussels, Belgium
- Date: 10 November 2022
- Target: Police officers
- Attack type: Stabbing
- Weapon: Knife
- Deaths: 1 police officer
- Injuries: 1 police officer and the perpetrator
- Motive: Islamic terrorism

On 10 November 2022 in Brussels, Belgium, a stabbing attack killed a police officer and injured another. Authorities suspected the attack to be terror-related. The attacker shouted the Arabic phrase "Allahu Akbar" during the attack.

== Background ==
During the late 20th and early 21st century, bombing and stabbing attacks increased in Brussels, including those in 1979, 2014, 2016, June 2017, August 2017 and 2018.

== Incident ==
At around 18:15 (GMT) close to the city's Brussels-North railway station, an attacker stabbed two officers. The attacker was shot in the legs and abdomen by another police patrol arriving at the scene. One of the police officers died after he was stabbed in the neck. The other wounded officer as well as the attacker were hospitalised.

== Suspect ==
The suspect was a 32-year-old Belgian-Moroccan named Yassine Mahi, who was born and resided in Brussels. He was known to Belgian security authorities and appeared on a list of radicalized Muslims. In the morning on the same day the stabbing incident happened, he made threats against the police at a police station. Despite the threats instead of arresting him, he was brought by the police to the psychiatric unit of the Saint-Luc hospital, where he stayed voluntarily for psychiatric treatment. There he was able to leave the hospital. The police checked the criteria for psychiatric surveillance, but because he voluntarily went to psychiatric treatment, the legal criteria was not given.
