= 2018 Brussels stabbing attack =

20 November 2018 terrorist action in Brussels

- Location: Brussels, Belgium
- Date: 20 November 2018 (CET)
- Target: Police, civilians
- Attack type: Stabbing
- Weapon: Knife
- Deaths: 0
- Injuries: 2 (including the perpetrator)

The 2018 Brussels stabbing attack occurred on 20 November 2018 when a man wielding two knives attacked police officers outside a police station adjacent to the Grand-Place/Grote Markt (main square) in Brussels, Belgium. A police officer was wounded and the attacker was shot and injured by the police. Both the attacker and a wounded officer were hospitalized with non life-threatening injuries. An investigation for possible links to terrorism is underway. Jan Jambon, Belgium's Minister of the Interior and Security, said the suspect had been interned and recently freed.

== Incident ==
At around 5.30 am local time (CET) on 20 November 2018 a man attacked two policemen outside a police station adjacent to Brussels' central Grand-Place/Grote Markt, stabbing one of the officers in the neck with a knife. Witnesses reported that the knife-wielding attacker screamed "Allahu Akbar" as he threw himself at the two policemen.

== Impact ==
The wounded officer was then rushed to hospital. The Belgian police said that the officer who was injured was not in life-threatening danger, but would be incapacitated for many weeks. The attacker, who wielded two kitchen knives, survived his injuries, but was left in a critical condition.

== Suspect ==
Belgian media reported the man, named by local press only as "Issam T," was known to police for robbery and violent crimes but not for any links to Islamic terrorism. He was released from a secure hospital in October against the recommendation of the office of the public prosecutor, which has now opened an investigation into "attempted murder with a terrorist motive". The suspect had previously tried to kill a prison guard.

== Investigation ==
On 23 November, via a warrant issued for "murder and acts of terrorism", police searched the home of a friend of the suspect.

== See also ==
- 2018 Liège attack
- August 2017 Brussels attack
- 2016 stabbing of Brussels police officers
- 2016 stabbing of Charleroi police officers
