= 1980 Antwerp attack =

Attack on a Jewish community in Belgium

- Location: Antwerp, Belgium
- Date: 27 July 1980; 46 years ago
- Target: Jewish civilians outside Agoudath Israel cultural centre
- Attack type: Bombing
- Weapon: 2 grenades
- Deaths: 1 child
- Injuries: 20 civilians
- Perpetrator: Said Al Nasr
- Motive: Palestinian nationalism

On 27 July 1980, Said Al Nasr, a Syria-born Palestinian, used grenades to attack a group of 40 Jewish children waiting with their families for a bus to take them to summer camp. One boy was killed and 20 other people were wounded in the attack. The attacker was convicted.

== Attack ==
The attack took place outside the Agoudath Israel cultural centre in Antwerp. The group of children, aged 10 to 14, originating from Britain, France, the Netherlands, Austria, and Belgium, were accompanied by their families as they waited to board a bus to take them to a summer camp in the Ardennes hills of southern Belgium. The explosion killed one boy, 15-year-old Parisian David Kohane, and wounded 20, aged 8 to 27, eight of whom had to be hospitalized, including a 13-year-old Belgian girl with critical brain injuries and a pregnant woman. 2 young brothers Zevi and Motti Glejser aged 8 and 9 respectively were walking past at the time of the attack and were wounded and hospitalised.

The attacker was arrested after witnesses chased him down. In addition to the thrown grenades, he was carrying a pistol and "several magazines of ammunition" that had not used in the attack.

The attack was among a number of anti-Jewish attacks worldwide in the early 1980s.

== Perpetrator ==
Al Nasr, a Syrian-Palestinian, was convicted in Belgium in 1980, for throwing two hand grenades into a group of Jewish children waiting for a bus in Antwerp on 27 July 1980. He was carrying a Moroccan passport at the time of his arrest.

In 1990, the jailed Al Nasr was "traded" for part of the Houtekins-Kets family, a Belgian-French family kidnapped in Libya—a demand of the Abu Nidal group—during the Silco incident.
