= Benjamin Rawitz-Castel =

Israeli classical pianist and piano teacher

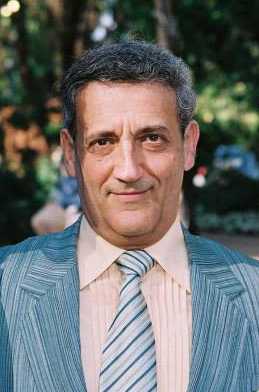

Benjamin Rawitz-Castel (Hebrew: בנימין ראוויץ-קאסטל; April 24, 1946 – August 29, 2006), was an Israeli classical pianist and piano teacher.

== Biography ==
Benjamin Ravitz was born and raised in Haifa, Israel, a graduate of Donia Weizman Conservatory in Haifa. First appeared as a soloist with the Haifa Symphony Orchestra at the age of 15, conducted by Sergio Comisione, and at the age of 17 with the Kol Israel Orchestra in Jerusalem. During his military service in the IDF orchestra, he performed as a soloist pianist with the orchestra at the Culture Hall in Tel Aviv, conducted by Yitzhak Graziani.

Graduated from the Academy of Music in Tel Aviv under the great teacher Ilona Vince-Kraus, the Conservatory in Geneva, and the Royal Flemish Conservatory in Brussels, where he served as a faculty member for over thirty years.

== Music career ==
He based his solo and chamber music career in Brussels.

His career as a pianist and chamber music player with an extensive and varied repertoire spanned many countries around the world: in America, Africa, the Far East and Europe, where he also participated in festivals such as the Flanders Festival in Belgium, as well as in festivals in Italy, Slovenia, Bulgaria, Wales, Norway and France, and won critical acclaim for his performances and records, as well as international awards such as the Albanis Award in Barcelona at the Maria Canals Competition, the Mozart Award from the pianist Géza Anda, as well as awards for chamber music.

Among others, he played with clarinetist Donald L. Oehler and violists Jonathan Bagg and Sergiu Schwartz.

He was one of the teaching staff in the annual courses in Switzerland, England, and the University of North Carolina at Chapel Hill. He was an honorary member of the 20th century competition in Orléans (France) and was invited to judge piano competitions in Italy. Many of his recordings are found in "Kol Israel", in the collection of recordings of "the Voice of Music".

== Awards and recognition ==
- Mozart-Prize, Zurich
- Premio Albéniz, Barcelona
- European Broadcasting Prize

== Death ==
On August 29, 2006, Rawitz was murdered in the course of a robbery in the building where he lived in Brussels.
One of the murderers was 15-year-old Junior Kabunda, a Belgian of Congolese origin. On December 20, 2010 Kabunda was sentenced to life imprisonment.
