= Silco incident =

1985 kidnapping of a Belgian-French family by the Libyan government

Silco Incident
- Location: Mediterranean Sea
- Date: August 1, 1985
- Target: Silco
- Attack type: Kidnapping
- Deaths: 0
- Injuries: Multiple people abducted
- Perpetrators: Abu Nidal Organization (ANO) and Gaddafi loyalists
- Motive: Unknown; those kidnapped later traded for release of Said Al Nasr

The Silco Incident involves the kidnapping of the Belgian-French family Houtekins-Kets by the Libyan government from their yacht Silco in the waters of the Mediterranean Sea on August 1, 1985.

== Capture and release ==
The Belgian part of the family was held for almost five years of captivity in Libya, but were freed after the release of Said Al Nasr (who was convicted in the early 1980s for throwing a hand grenade into a group of Jewish children in Antwerp in the 1980 Antwerp summer camp attack) for the family, in Cairo, Egypt, on January 12, 1991. The French part of the family were released somewhat earlier, when the French government negotiated their freedom with the Libyan government.

== See also ==
- List of kidnappings
- List of people who disappeared
