= Brussels Gallery Weekend =

Visual art event held in Brussels, Belgium

The Brussels Gallery Weekend is an event dedicated to contemporary visual art in Brussels. This weekend usually occurs in September and is divided in two main tours. One throughout the main art galleries of the city and one, curated by an independent curator, in the main artistic institutions.

The weekend also hosts professional gatherings, talks, workshop visits, performances and screenings.

== Brussels Gallery Walks ==
Since 2020, the Brussels Gallery Walks have been offering the public the opportunity to discover the city of Brussels through the prism of contemporary art. These cultural walks are aimed at professionals from the art world, as well as amateurs and the curious. This new proposal allows to highlight the partner galleries of the Brussels Gallery Weekend and the essential places of contemporary art while strolling through the city centre of Brussels.

== 2020 Edition ==
This year, the 13th edition of the Brussels Gallery Weekend adapts itself to the current health context in order to better apprehend the development of the emerging Brussels and international art scene. From the 3rd to the 6th of September 2020, Brussels Gallery Weekend will offer a tour of the city to introduce a wide public to galleries, institutions and non-profit art spaces. In parallel to this event, the exhibition 'Generation Brussels', curated by Evelyn Simons, will invite 11 young Brussels artists to invest in the city's showcases and public spaces. Each section of the event will be available on a new digital platform in order to support young Brussels talents and to ensure specialised visits to the public and professionals.

=== Participating galleries ===
ARCADE, Archiraar Gallery, La Patinoire Royale - Galerie Valérie Bach, Ballon Rouge Collective, Baronian Xippas, Bernier/Eliades Gallery, Didier Claes Gallery, CLEARING, Damien & The Love Guru, dépendance, Dvir Gallery, Galerie DYS, MLF | Marie-Laure Fleisch, La Forest Divonne, Galerie Félix Frachon, Pierre Marie Giraud, Gladstone Gallery, Xavier Hufkens, rodolphe janssen, LA MAISON DE RENDEZ-VOUS, Irène Laub Gallery, Harlan Levey Projects, LMNO, MARUANI MERCIER, Galerie Greta Meert, Meessen de Clercq, Mendes Wood DM, Montoro 12, Jan Mot, Galerie Nathalie Obadia, OV project, ALMINE RECH, Sorry We’re Closed, Spazio Nobile, Stems Gallery, TEMPLON.

=== Generation Brussels ===
Since 2018, Brussels Gallery Weekend has developed its own exhibition, highlighting the Brussels young creation that is not yet represented by a gallery.

Generation Brussels brings together a selection of emerging artists, art students, young graduated and other more experienced artists, who live and work in Brussels. In 2018, BGW welcomed 3500 visitors. In 2019, the number of visitors is estimated at 7000.

This year, Generation Brussels is reinventing itself by associating indoor space with public space! This project will be carried out by Belgian curator Evelyn Simons, who previously developed this kind of experience in Athens. The format of the exhibition has been strongly adapted to be visible in shop windows.

An archive and a direct presence will be created on the new online platform.

== 2019 Edition ==
=== New for 2019 ===
For this year 2019, many new features were on the agenda.

A mediation team was there to help and guide the public through the exhibitions, institutions, galleries, transport and more, for the whole duration of the event and to accompany them in the best way possible. Social development is highlighted in particular through a social project that was created with The Skateroom with the aim of financing 1000 skateboard lessons in Brussels for unaccompanied minor refugees. A desire to highlight the local scene notably through local editions and publications in Rectangle, Triangle Books and Eat My Paper.

=== Accessibility ===
Kunst Aan Zet or Achetez démocratiquement In collaboration with BGW, an exhibition of works by Belgian artists presents the interest-free credit purchase project launched in September.

=== With the shops ===
Edition Claudia Comte & Boulengier Claudia Comte and Boulengier created an edition made from bread. A way to acquire a small work of art. and to allow our partners to be in their shops as well as during our events and at the VDB.

=== Participating galleries ===
Rodolphe Janssen, Almine Rech, Office Baroque, Gladstone Gallery, Greta Meert, Meessen Declercq, QG, MLF | Marie-Laure Fleisch, Mendes Wood, dépendance, Harlan Levey, Jan Mot, Xavier Hufkens, Sorry We're Closed, Stems Gallery, Bernier-eliades, Albert Baronian, Didier Claes, Maruani Mercier, Templon, Nathalie Obadia, Alice Gallery, La Patinoire Royale, Galerie Valérie, Bach, Pierre-Marie Giraud, Victor Hunt Designaert Dealer, Vedovi Gallery, CLEARING, Waldburger, Wouter, Hopstreet Gallery, Irène Laub Gallery, Maniera, LMNO, Felix Frachon, Park view/Paul Soto, Damien and The Love Guru, OV Project, Galerie de la Béraudière

== 2018 Edition ==
From September 6–9, Brussels Gallery Weekend holds its 11th edition. This year, 40 galleries, a dozen institutions and several artists run spaces will open their doors to the public. Once again, Brussels Gallery Weekend is a highlight on the international arts calendar, reinforcing Brussels’ reputation as a global contemporary art destination and shining a light on the diversity of approaches and actors that contribute to this. In 2017, more than 7000 visitors attended the event and more attendance is expected this year. New in 2018 is a “meeting point,” which can be found in the Vanderborght building, which will also host an exhibition dedicated to local artists without gallery representation.

=== A Bold Selection ===
Selected by a committee of renowned galleries (dépendance, Xavier Hufkens, Harlan Levey Projects, Jan Mot, Templon and Waldburger Wouters), participants are chosen for the excellence and audacity of their programs. «Our goal is to offer a reflection of the abundance of artistic quality in Brussels. There is such a richness in our capital that it was essential to find it in the selection. This is an opportunity for the public to appreciate the work of emerging and recognized artists from around the world. For us, the organizers, there is a real pride in presenting a program of this level,» explains Sybille du Roy, Director of the Brussels Gallery Weekend.

=== First Highlights ===
New participating galleries include Alice Gallery, Damian and the Love Guru, and Park View/Paul Soto. Early highlights feature Giancarlo Scaglia at Bernier-Eliades, a two-gallery exhibition by Sterling Ruby at Xavier Hufkens and Pierre Marie Giraud, Ed Atkins at dépendance, Tyrell Winston at Stems, and Calder and Miró at Galerie de la Béraudière. Dutch architect Anne Holtrop, laureate of the prestigious 2014 Iakov Chernikhov International Prize, will be showcased at Maniera.

Visitors will also have the opportunity to explore the city's flourishing art institutions and artist-run spaces. "The Brussels artistic landscape is changing; galleries are spreading out and artist-run spaces are opening up all over the place. In the last few years, clusters have developed in Ixelles, Saint-Gilles, Molenbeek, Forest, and downtown. This expansion reflects an increase in active participants and a commitment to local engagement, highlighting the kind of art hub Brussels is becoming," added Sybille du Roy.

=== Youth in the spotlight ===
Totally new this year, the exhibition “Generation Brussels”, curated by Louis-Philippe Van Eeckhoutte and located in the Vanderborght building, adds a place for unrepresented artists to engage with the Brussels Gallery Weekend public. Belgian curator Louis-Philippe Van Eeckhoutte, who worked for several years in a Belgian gallery and before that in New York at Algus Greenspon, David Zwirner & Swiss Institute. «I contacted art schools, artists’ studios and various artistic spaces in Brussels to present a selection, both qualitative and diverse, of young artists,» says Louis-Philippe, «with this new initiative, we aim to build bridges between the old and the new generation, and to provide more visibility to these promising talents”. The names of the artists will be announced in September. As Sybille du Roy explains, “Providing for younger artists is an objective of the event. It reflects how galleries work for and aid artists, in this case by creating opportunities, encounters and training for the next generation of local talent”. In addition to this exhibition, a free pedagogical file can be downloaded from www.brusselsgalleryweekend.com and guided tours given by Art History students are available.

=== Your visit: by shuttle, by foot or by bike! ===
Enjoy the Brussels Gallery Weekend by taking advantage of thematic itineraries, downloadable from the website of the event and picking up a tear-proof Tyvek map with all the addresses of the 2018 edition (available in all galleries, participating institutions and at the Vanderborght meeting point).

Particular attention has also been paid to mobility: pedestrian and cycling routes are planned, as well as free Shuttles by Art Brussels to link up and downtown. Note also a novelty for this edition: partnerships with Villo, Billy Bike and Uber were set up to offer preferential rates to the public of the event, and thus facilitate traffic in the city.

=== Participating galleries ===
Alice Gallery, La Patinoire Royale - Galerie Valérie Bach, Albert Baronian, Galerie de la Béraudière, Bernier/Eliades, Didier Claes Gallery, CLEARING, Damien and the Love Guru, dépendance, MLF | MARIE-LAURE FLEISCH, La Forest Divonne, Galerie Felix Frachon, Pierre Marie Giraud, Gladstone Gallery, Hopstreet Gallery, Xavier Hufkens, Victor Hunt Designaert Dealer, rodolphe janssen, Irène Laub Gallery, Harlan Levey Projects, LMNO, MANIERA, MARUANI MERCIER, Greta Meert, Meessen De Clercq, Mendes Wood DM, Jan Mot, Nathalie Obadia, Office Baroque, OV project, Park View/Paul Soto, QG Gallery, Almine Rech, Sorry We’re Closed, Stems, Galerie Templon, Vedovi Gallery, Waldburger Wouters, Galerie Zink Waldkirchen.

== 2017 Edition : The tenth edition ==
=== International programming ===
Selected by a panel of renowned professionals (Gladstone Gallery, Harlan Levey Projects, Xavier Hufkens, Office Baroque, dépendance), the selected galleries shined through the quality and audacity of their programs. Among the great names on display are Vedovi Gallery's three iconic masterpieces by Constantin Brancusi, who disappeared seventy years ago this year. In a different spirit, the Hufkens Gallery presented creations by Tracey Emin, a living artist whose exhibition set record attendance at the Scottish National Gallery of Modern Art in Edinburgh (over 40,000 visitors). Gallerist Felix Frachon, a newcomer to the Gallery Weekend, presented the work of young artist Raina Gupta and opened his second space in the city which is dedicated to curatorial projects. Belgian conceptual artist Koen Van Mechelen has been exhibited at Galerie Valérie Bach. Kendell Geers, of South African origin and installed in Brussels, has been the subject of a double exhibition, audacious association between the galleries Rodolphe Janssen and Didier Claes.

In addition to these prestigious names, the Brussels Gallery Weekend hosted unprecedented collaborations. Among them, the Office Baroque Gallery combined the work of a missing artist with the works of young talents. A mirror effect in which the famous representations of Hans Bellmer, the head of surrealism since the 1930s, rubbed shoulders with the biomorphic figures of Sacha Braunig and the biological abstraction of Mathew Ronay. Another place, another perspective in the OV Project Gallery: the confrontation of the conceptual art of Ted Stamm with a pioneer of modern design, Gerrit Rietveld.

For the 10th anniversary edition, contemporary art galleries have been complemented by those focused on Modern art (Galerie de la Beraudière, Galerie Vedovi), African art (Didier Claes), design (Victor Hunt, Maniera, Xavier Lust), Ceramics (Pierre Marie Giraud), or jewelry. As Charlote Dumoncel d’Argence, a collaborator at the Caroline Van Hoek Gallery, explains, “the Brussels Gallery Weekend blends many forms of artistic expression. For us, it is a real opportunity to make known to a public fond of discoveries the remarkable creations in contemporary jewelry of our artists.” Finally, the galleries program is complemented by the participation of invited artists’ institutions and spaces.

In recent years, Brussels has positioned itself as a major capital of contemporary art. With two major events each year, Art Brussels in April and the Brussels Gallery Weekend in September, which now competes with cities like Berlin, Paris and London.

=== Participating galleries ===
AEROPLASTICS @Washington186, Galerie Valérie Bach, Albert Baronian, Galerie de la Béraudière, Bernier/Eliades Gallery, didier Claes Gallery, C L E A R I N G, Galerie Conradi, dépendance, MLF | Marie-Laure Fleisch, La Forest Divonne, Galerie Felix Frachon, 26 By Felix Frachon, Pierre Marie Giraud, Gladstone Gallery, Hopstreet Gallery, Xavier Hufkens, Victor Hunt Designart Dealer, rodolphe Janssen, Keitelman Gallery, Irène Laub Gallery, Harlan Levey Projects, LMNO, Xavier Lust, MANIERA, MARUANI MERCIER, Galerie Greta Meert, Meessen De Clercq, Mendes Wood DM, Jan Mot, Galerie Nathalie Obadia Paris/Bruxelles, Office Baroque, OV Project, Almine Rech Gallery, Michel Rein, Sorry We're Closed/ Sebastien Janssen, Spazio Nobile Gallery, Stems Gallery, Galerie Templon, CAROLINE VAN HOEK, Vedovi Gallery, Waldburger Wouters.

==== Non-profits ====
Artists Club Coffre Fort, Boghossian Foundation - Villa Empain, CAB Art Center, Damien & The Love Guru, Etablissement d'en Face, Greylight Projects, ISELP, KOMPLOT, La Loge, Wiels.

== 2016 Edition ==
In 2016, Brussels Art Days was renamed Brussels Gallery Weekend. The ninth edition of the event marked the openeing of the city's gallery season and included exhibitions, panels discussions and tours at contemporary art galleries and art institutions across Brussels.

The New York Times described Brussels during Art Brussels week as a “serious destination for collectors of contemporary art". Brussels Gallery Weekend took place over four days in September, with additional exhibitions and events organised at venues throughout the city.

=== Curatorial Approach ===
Following last year's collaboration with Caroline Dumalin of WIELS, in 2016, Brussels Gallery Weekend has invited Matteo Lucchetti as guest curator.

Matteo Lucchetti (born 1984) is an art historian, independent curator, and critic. He holds an MA in Visual Arts and Curatorial Studies with a thesis entitled Enacting a Community, about the relationship between collaborative artistic practices and the idea of community. He has been curator in residence at AIR – Artist in residence, Antwerp, Kadist Art Foundation, Paris, and Para Site, Hong Kong. His main curatorial projects include: Don't Embarrass the Bureau (Lund Konsthall, Lund, 2014); Enacting Populism in its Mediascape (AIR and Extra City, Antwerpen, – Kadist Foundation, Paris, 2011–2012); Practicing Memory – in a time of an all-encompassing present (Cittadellarte – Fondazione Pistoletto, Biella, 2010). Lucchetti lectures regularly at the Piet Zwart Institute, Rotterdam and is a visiting lecturer at the Brera Art Academy, Milan and at St Lucas University College of Art, Antwerp. He has written for Manifesta blog, Art-Agenda, This is Tomorrow, and Mousse, among others.

=== Participating galleries ===
Aeroplastics, Valérie Bach, Albert Baronian, Bernier/Eliades, Didier Claes, Dauwens & Beernaert, dépendance, Dvir, Feizi, MLF | Marie-Laure Fleisch, Pierre-Marie Giraud, Gladstone, Hopstreet, Xavier Hufkens, Jablonka Maruani Mercier, Rodolphe Janssen, Keitelman, Harlan Levey Projects, Maniera, Greta Meert, Meessen De Clercq, Jan Mot, MOT International, Nathalie Obadia, Office Baroque, Almine Rech, Michel Rein, Sorry We’re Closed, Stems, Micheline Szwajcer, Daniel Templon, Caroline Van Hoek.

=== Guest Venues ===
Every year Brussels Gallery Weekend also puts a spotlight on non-profit, institutional and artist run spaces that contribute to the city's contemporary art landscape as well as some of the private collections that have helped raise the profile of Brussels as a destination for contemporary art.

Boghossian Foundation, BOZAR, CAB, Clovis XV, Deborah Bowmann, ERG, Etablissement d'en face, ISELP, Island, Komplot, La Loge, NICC, Parc Design, Rosa Brux, Société, Vanhaerents Art Collection, WIELS.

== 2015 Edition ==
=== Participating Galleries ===
The participating galleries in 2015 were Aeroplastics, Valérie Bach, Albert Baronian, Catherine Bastide, dépendance, Feizi, Pierre-Marie Giraud, Gladstone, Hopstreet, Xavier Hufkens, Independent, Jablonka Maruani Mercier, Rodolphe Janssen, Jeanrochdard, Jozsa, Keitelman, Harlan Levey Projects, Levy. Delval, Greta Meert, Meessen De Clercq, Jan Mot, MOT International, Nathalie Obadia, Office Baroque, Almine Rech, Michel Rein, Sorry We're Closed, Super Dakota, Micheline Szwajcer, Daniel Templon et Caroline Van Hoek.

=== The Curated Tour ===
In 2015, the tour was curated by Caroline Dumalin (Wiels). She proposed a curated selection of contemporary art collectives and institutions: Aleppo, apes&castles, les Ateliers Claus, BOZAR, Bureau des Réalités, Enough Room for space, Etablissement d’en face projects, KVS, La Loge, Middlemarch, Wiels.
