= Butare Four =

The Butare Four are four Rwandans who were convicted in June 2001 for war crimes that occurred during the Rwanda genocide. The case was the first time that a Belgian court had convicted people for a crime committed abroad against international law.

== Detail ==
The four individuals were Vincent Ntezimana, a former professor at Butare University; Alphonse Higaniro, the SORWAL factory director; and Benedictine nuns Sister Gertrude a.k.a. Consolata Mukangango and Sister Kisito a.k.a. Julienne Mukabutera. The four were convicted for participating in the killing of Tutsi citizens in their native Rwanda. The four fled to Belgium, where they were subsequently tried, convicted, and sentenced to 12 to 20 years under Belgian law.

Belgium did not have an extradition treaty with Rwanda at the time. The Belgium courts implemented the use of universal jurisdiction. This is the first case in which Belgium applied universal jurisdiction. In addition, it was the first time individuals were tried and convicted under the 1993 Act Concerning Grave Breaches of International Humanitarian Law.

== Additional sources ==
- Belgium's First Application of Universal Jurisdiction: the Butare Four Case, Luc Reydams, Oxford Journals
