= Junior Kabunda =

Belgian serial killer

- Born: Junior Pashi Kabunda; 1991 (age 34–35); Brussels, Belgium
- Other name: "The Monster of Brussels"
- Conviction: Murder x3
- Penalty: Life imprisonment plus 25 years

Details
- Victims: 3
- Span of crimes: 2006–2009
- Country: Belgium
- State: Brussels
- Date apprehended: 2009
- Imprisoned at: Nivelles Prison

Junior Pashi Kabunda (born 1991), known as The Monster of Brussels, is a Belgian criminal and serial killer. After participating in the 2006 robbery-murder of Israeli pianist Benjamin Rawitz-Castel, he went on to murder his daughter and her great-grandmother three years later. For his latter crimes, he was sentenced to life imprisonment plus 25 years.

== Early life ==
Little is known about Kabunda's childhood. Born in the capital to Congolese parents in 1991, he was described as an unhappy boy who often clashed with those closest to him. As an adolescent, he joined a criminal gang, as well as dealing and using drugs in the area.

On 29 August 2006, together with 22-year-old Laurent Oniemba, the two men were walking around Brussels in the middle of the night when they chanced upon Benjamin Rawitz-Castel, who was returning from a concert in Enghien, Hainaut. When they noticed that he was entering his Honda Civic, Oniemba and Kabunda attacked him, beating Rawitz-Castel into unconsciousness and dragging his body to a nearby basement. When he temporarily came back to his senses, the elderly man asked what he had done, before being beaten again and succumbing to his injuries. After the deed was done, the two killers stole his car and sped off. In March 2008, both were arrested for manslaughter, but as Kabunda was underage at the time, he was sent off to a youth facility instead of facing charges.

In September 2009, Kabunda was allowed to leave the facility, to visit his girlfriend Céline's family, which resided in Woluwe-Saint-Lambert. On 20 September, in a state of anger over doubts that he wasn't the father of Céline's child, Kabunda proceeded to rape and murder 79-year-old Marcelle Deconinck, Céline's grandmother, before proceeding to beat 18-month-old Anaïs to death as well. In addition, he attempted to strangle Céline, leaving her for dead. Not long after, Kabunda was arrested and charged with both murders.

== Arrest, trial and imprisonment ==
While imprisoned and awaiting trial for the familicides, guards from the Nivelles Prison discovered a SIM card in Kabunda's cell. Taking into account that he had allegedly told another prisoner of planning an escape, additional security measures were taken to prevent him from doing so. On 20 December 2010, the Brussels court of assizes found him guilty of double murder, murder and attempted homicide, giving Kabunda a life imprisonment sentence plus 25 years. This decision was later appealed by one of his lawyers, Yannick De Vlaeminck, citing procedural errors, but the appeal was denied.

== See also ==
- List of serial killers by country
