= Manga murder =

2007 murder in Belgium

The Manga murder (Dutch: Mangamoord) is a solved Belgian murder case once believed to involve a serial killer, referred to as the Manga Killer. The name of the case was coined by the Belgian media and has to do with the notes that were found near the victim. The notes carried a sentence in capital letters and in different colors, referring to the manga series Death Note: "Watashi wa Kira dess" [sic], a mistransliteration of "I am Kira" (私はキラです, Watashi wa Kira desu). Light Yagami, also known as Kira, is the protagonist and antihero of the series. The line is a reference to Kira from the Death Note series, who is a god-like figure who murders criminals by using a Shinigami's (god of death's) notebook called a Death Note. Light Yagami, who is Kira, speaks this line as a confession near the end of the series. In the series, Kira goes on a killing spree, assisted by his supernatural notebook, trying to cleanse the world of criminals and create a new world full of good people.

The case received much attention from the Japanese media.

== Case details ==
On Friday, September 28, 2007, parts of a mutilated corpse, the torso and two thighs, were found in Parc Duden/Dudenpark in Forest, Brussels, by two pedestrians who happened to notice the smell of the rotting parts. A short while later the two notes referring to the Death Note series were found nearby.

The detectives working the case were unable to identify the victim, because so many body parts were missing. What they did conclude was:

- The body was only a day or two old when found, or had been stored in a freezer. Storage in a freezer is plausible because it can explain the surgical precision of the cut.
- The body was Caucasian, between 20 and 30 years old.
- The location of the victim was very close to the highest point of Brussels, possibly a symbolic location since Kira acts as a god of death in the manga.
- The scrotum and thighs of the body were shaved, also possibly pointing in the direction of a psychopathic act.

The detectives mentioned a practical joke by medicine students as one of the possibilities; the academic year had just started and the students have relatively easy access to dead bodies. Still, the police feared that they were dealing with a serial killer.

A public announcement asking for witnesses received a single reaction. A jogger had seen a blonde man lying down on the same spot where the victim was found two days later. The next day she saw the man again. The witness thought the man was sleeping and did not pay much attention to it. It is not certain that the man was indeed the victim.

The police established cooperation with the group Corpus, who are involved in the investigation of the Mons serial killer, because there was a similar modus operandi. The "clean", meaning straight, cut of the limbs was very similar to that of the so-called garbage bag killings in Mons.

A month after the event, a new article was published in a Belgian newspaper, stating that the detectives still had not achieved any progress in the case.

== Conclusion to the case ==
By September 2010, four suspects had been arrested and interrogated, with the names of both them and the victim still withheld; it was found that the victim was a missing person living with several of the suspects at the time of their disappearance. According to the Belgian newspaper Le Soir, the spokesperson for the police said that the suspects decided to leave the two notes near the body since they were fans of the manga Death Note. The victim was later identified as Sidi Larbi Ezzoubairi. They had met him in Zeebrugge, and killed him on the night of 11-12 September 2007 at the apartment where he was living in Schaerbeek, Brussels.

In June 2013, two of the four suspects, Sidi Mohamed Atir and Abdessamad Azmi, were convicted and given prison sentences of 20 years. A third suspect, Zacharia Benaissa, was convicted and sentenced to a term of 23 years. Benaissa went on the run after appearing in court for only one day. He was arrested in Gabon on 15 May 2016 and transferred to Belgium to serve his sentence in Forest Prison.
