= 2018 Liège attack =

29 May 2018 terrorist action in Liège, Belgium

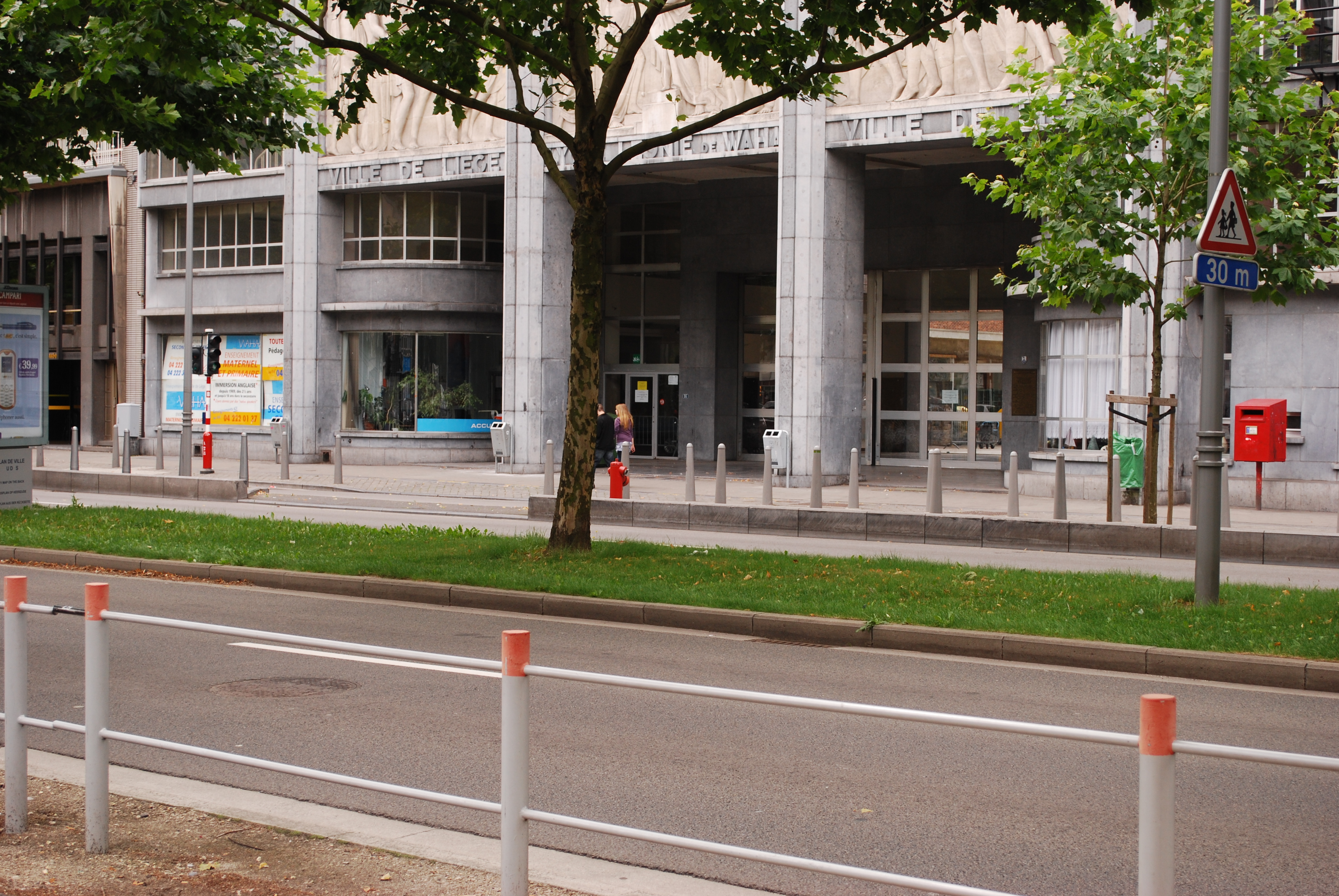
- Location: 50°38′08″N 5°34′03″E; Liège, Belgium
- Date: 29 May 2018; 10:30 CEST (UTC+2)
- Target: Police officers, civilians
- Attack type: Shooting, hostage-taking
- Weapons: Knife; Two 9mm Smith & Wesson M&P9 semi-automatic handguns (stolen from both officers)
- Deaths: 4 (including the perpetrator)
- Injuries: 4
- Perpetrator: Benjamin Herman
- Motive: Islamic terrorism

On 29 May 2018, Benjamin Herman, a prisoner on temporary leave from prison, stabbed two female police officers, took their guns, shot and killed them and a civilian in Liège, Belgium. The gunman took a woman hostage before he was killed by police. The attacker had since 2017 been suspected of having been radicalised in prison after converting to Islam, and was reported to be part of the entourage of a prison Islamist recruiter. The method of the attack was said by investigators to match and be specifically encouraged by the Islamic State which claimed the attack. Prosecutors say they are treating the attacks as "terrorist murder". The attack is treated as "jihadist terrorism" by Europol.

== Background ==
Recent stabbing attacks on police officers in Belgium have included the 2016 stabbing of Brussels police officers, the 2016 stabbing of Charleroi police officers and the stabbing of two officers on 7 September 2016 in Molenbeek.

Belgium, which had been on high alert since a Brussels-based Islamic State (IS) cell was involved in the November 2015 Paris attacks and the March 2016 Brussels bombings that killed 32 people, lowered its alert level in January 2018 citing the defeat of ISIS and a reduction in the number of people coming to Belgium from Syria.

The Belgian parliament issued a report in 2018 warning that convicts in the country had been behind several recent attacks in Europe and further expressed concerns that hundreds of prisoners deemed radical by authorities are due to be released in the coming years.

== Stabbing and shooting ==
At about 10:30, outside the Aux Augustins café in Liege's city centre, the attacker shouted "Allahu Akbar", according to Federal Magistrate Wenke Rogen and according to a video reported by La Repubblica. He was armed with a knife that he used to stab two female officers, Lucile Garcia and Soraya Belkacemi, from behind as they were checking parking meters. He took one of the officers' handguns (he was later pictured with two handguns) and fatally shot the officers. A 22-year-old male, Cyril Vangriecken, was also killed in an attempted car-jacking before the perpetrator went into the Athénée de Waha high school and tried to take a female cleaner hostage who was left unharmed after she told the attacker that she was a Muslim who observed Ramadan, and persuaded him to not harm the pupils. All the students had been evacuated to the nearby Botanical Garden.

The perpetrator then left the school and shot two police officers in the leg, leaving one officer in a serious condition. Two other officers received injuries to their arms before the attacker was shot dead when the police returned fire.

Catherine Collignon, a spokesman for the Liège prosecutors, confirmed the deaths of four people, including the assailant. She later claimed the attack matched the style of similar IS-inspired attacks and told a press conference the attack "qualified as terrorist murder and attempted terrorist murder."

A terrorism investigation was launched after the attack. The method of the attack, repeatedly stabbing the policewomen before using their own firearms to kill them, while shouting "Allahu Akbar", was said by investigators to be specifically encouraged by the Islamic State.

== Perpetrator ==
Benjamin Herman, a 31-year-old Belgian, was reported as the perpetrator who had been released from prison on 28 May on a one-day parole after being held for drug offences. Investigators sought to determine if he had been radicalised in prison as he had reportedly been in contact with radicalised Islamists while confined although he was not listed as an extremist threat. During a search of his cell after the attack, investigators found a Quran and a prayer rug.

He was from Rochefort, about an hour from Liège. He was known to police for crimes such as robbery, assault and drug dealing. His family leave was given in order to prepare for his re-integration into society despite a prison service assessment that he was very violent.

The night before the attack, Herman also killed Michael Wilmet in Marche-en-Famenne, repeatedly hitting him with a hammer. Wilmet was a former prisoner, convicted on drug charges, whom Herman had met in jail.

On 30 May, Amaq News Agency, linked to the Islamic State, claimed that a "soldier of the Caliphate" had responded to the proscribed group's call to attack citizens of countries in the international coalition fighting it.

== Reactions ==
=== Domestic ===
The monarchy of Belgium offered its condolences, while King Philippe of Belgium visited the scene along with Prime Minister Charles Michel, who also offered his condolences. Belgium's national threat level remained at two out of four, indicating an average risk of an attack.

As part of the initial investigation reasons, Deputy Prime Minister Alexander De Croo asked: "Everyone in Belgium is asking the same question: how is it possible that someone convicted for such serious acts was allowed to leave prisons?" Justice Minister Koen Geens then claimed that there was not any reason to suspect this time would be different from his earlier furloughs and that Herman's latest temporary leave was the 14th time since his detention and was intended to help him prepare for eventual reintegration into society in 2020. "I don’t think those are mistakes. It is not a clear-cut case of radicalisation – otherwise he would have been flagged by all services." Michel concurred with the assessment that Herman had not figured directly on the primary national register of threats.

The day after the attack, a ceremony honouring the victims was held in Espace Tivoli in Liège at 13:00 which was observed by many police officers, politicians, and members of the public. Seven minutes of silence were observed, ending with spontaneous applause from the crowd.

=== International ===
Belgium-based NATO Secretary-General Jens Stoltenberg offered his condolences and solidarity.

== See also ==
- 2011 Liège attack
- 2018 Brussels stabbing attack
