= 2016 Charleroi slashing =

Terrorist attack in Charleroi, Belgium

Coordinates: 50.4120°N 4.4536°E

2016 stabbing of Charleroi police officers
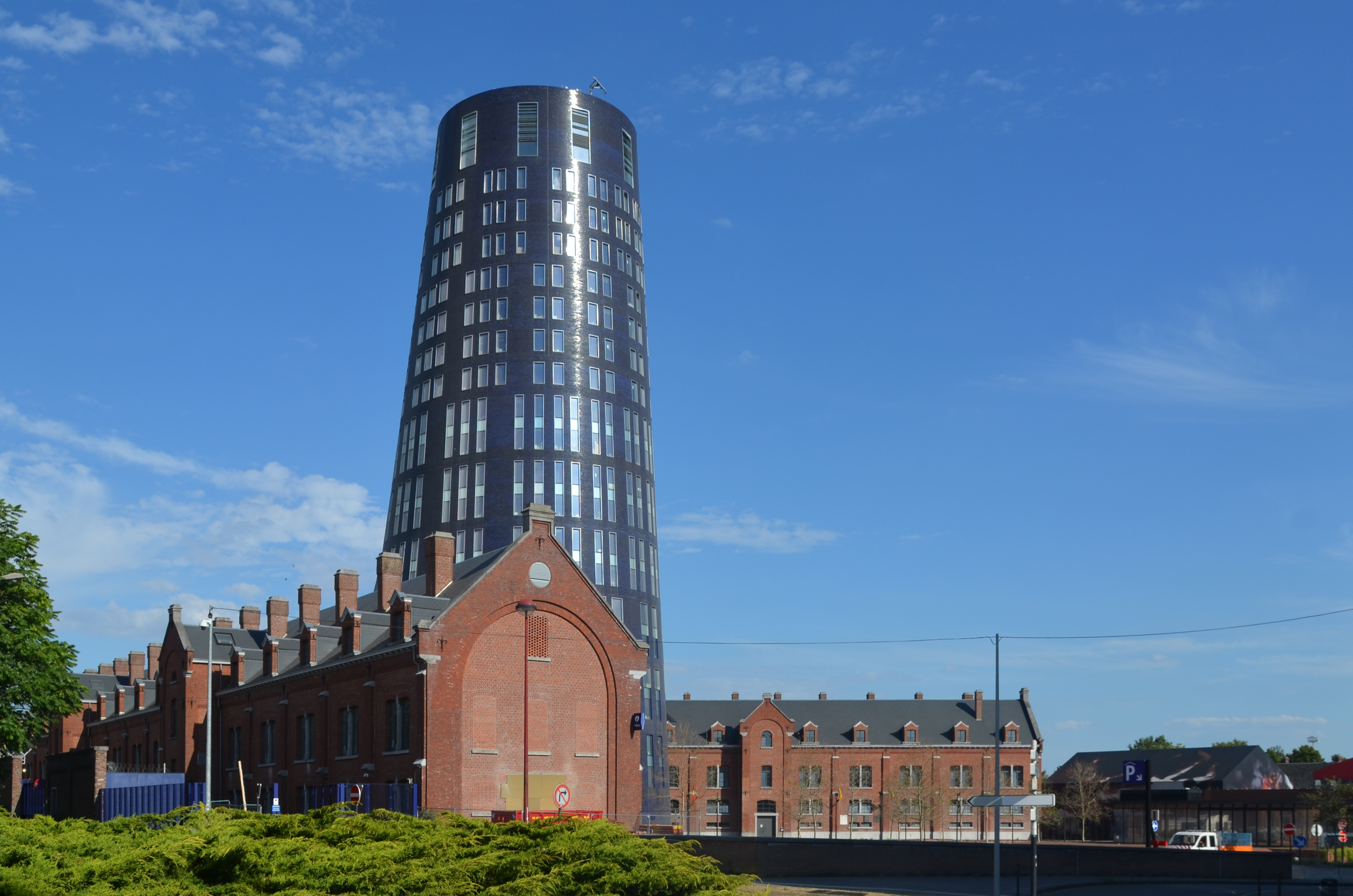
- Tour bleue (Blue tower) by Jean Nouvel, the police headquarter of Charleroi.

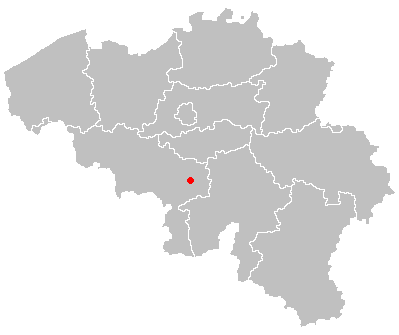
- Location of Charleroi in Belgium
- Location: Charleroi, Belgium
- Date: 6 August 2016 (UTC+02:00)
- Attack type: Knife attack, terrorist attack
- Weapon: Machete
- Deaths: 1 (the perpetrator)
- Injuries: 2
- Perpetrator: Khaled Babbouri
- Motive: Islamic extremism

On 6 August 2016, a man attacked two police officers with a machete in Charleroi, Belgium, before being shot dead by another police officer.

== Background ==
The attack was one of a series of attacks on Belgian police officers in 2016, including the stabbing of two officers on 7 September 2016 in Molenbeek and the 5 October 2016 stabbing of Brussels police officers.

== Slashing ==
According to accounts of Belgian police and prosecutors, the attack began just before 4:00 p.m., when the perpetrator approached two officers stationed at the checkpoint at the front of the police headquarters, immediately pulled a machete from the sports bag he carried and swung it violently toward the officer's heads. A third officer posted nearby shot the assailant. The attacker is reported to have said "Allahu Akbar" during the attack. Prime Minister Charles Michel said the incident is believed to be a terrorist attack, which would make it the first terrorist attack in Belgium since the Brussels bombings in March. The Islamic State of Iraq and the Levant claimed responsibility for the attack.

== Perpetrator ==
The attacker was a 33-year-old Algerian man who had a criminal record. He had lived in Belgium illegally from 2012 until his death. He attended the mosque at Farciennes. Belgian authorities have released the perpetrator's initials, K.B., but have not released his name. Media outlets released the man's name as Khaled Babbouri.

Two deportation orders had been issued for the perpetrator, but not carried out because Algeria and Belgium lack a diplomatic agreement under which Algerian citizens can be involuntarily sent back to Algeria. The perpetrator was not securely detained because Belgium has fewer spaces in secure detention facilities than individuals for whom deportation orders have been issued.

== Victims ==
Both victims were policewomen (Corinne and Hakima). One suffered an injury to her jaw and had to undergo a second operation to avoid facial paralysis. Another suffered a "large facial scar", and had life-threatening injuries. Both were operated in hospital as emergency cases.

== Investigation ==
Interior minister Jan Jambon stated that OCAM (Organ for Coordination for Analysis of Threats) is evaluating the attack "to determine if it is terrorism." A "social housing" home was visited by the police the evening of the attack and further investigated by federal police, an evidence unit, and a bomb squad the following day. Le Soir reported that an Algerian family live at the residence.

== Reaction ==
King Philippe of Belgium visited the victims and the site of the attack.

The Mouvement Réformateur party presented a law on the Belgian Parliament that Belgian foreign aid be withheld from countries that don't allow the repatriation of their own citizens who are illegal immigrants in Belgium, and the Charleroi attack was cited as an example.

== See also ==
- List of Islamist terrorist attacks
- Terrorism in the European Union
- 2016 Brussels bombings
- 2016 stabbing of Brussels police officers
- 2018 Liège shooting
