= 2017 Brussels stabbing attack =

Terrorist attack in Belgium

- Location: Brussels, Belgium
- Date: 25 August 2017
- Target: Brussels police officers
- Attack type: Stabbing, terrorist attack
- Weapon: Machete
- Deaths: 1 (the attacker)
- Injuries: 2
- Perpetrator: Haashi Ayaanle
- Motive: Islamic extremism

On 25 August 2017, a stabbing occurred near the Grand-Place/Grote Markt (main square) in Brussels, Belgium, when two soldiers were injured by an assailant wielding a knife.

== Events ==
Since the Paris attacks in 2015 and the 2016 Brussels bombings, soldiers have been on patrol in Brussels. The New York Times reported that Brussels had been "on edge" as a result of previous terrorist attacks, and Reuters reported that "1,200 soldiers patrol Belgium's main cities and the country is on its second highest threat level."

The attack took place on the Boulevard Émile Jacqmain, near the city's central Grand-Place, and was being treated by Belgian authorities as a terrorist attack.

The assailant was Haashi Ayaanle, a 30-year-old male Somali immigrant born in 1987. Authorities say he was not known for terrorist activity. Ayaanle was shot and later died of his injuries in hospital. He arrived in Belgium in 2004 and was granted Belgian citizenship in 2015. Ayaanle lived in public housing in Bruges, where the mayor declared the suspect showed no prior signs of radicalization.

A spokeswoman for the prosecutor's office said that the assailant shouted "Allahu Akbar" twice as he rushed the soldiers, attacking them from behind. In addition to the large knife with which he attacked, Ayaanle was carrying a replica of a gun and a copy of the Quran. The alleged assailant, Haashi Ayaanle, worked for Victor Buyck Steel Construction in Eeklo as a welder from 2013 until April 2017. He was let go by the company after an incident in April 2017 when he attempted to attack fellow workers with a screwdriver. Although Ayaanle's fellow workers asserted that there had been no motive for the attack, Ayaanle told his attorney that they were peeking at him in his home and taking clandestine photos of him, causing the lawyer to request a mental status examination and resulting in Ayaanle being voluntarily hospitalized at St. Jan psychiatric hospital in Eeklo. He was discharged after three weeks, with advice to continue taking his prescribed medication. He found work again for a short time, before falling out of contact, even with his attorney. Ayaanle was reported as having been in contact with members of the Somali fundamentalist community.

== Reactions ==
The Amaq News Agency, claimed that the Islamic State was responsible for the attack. According to the Amaq statement, "the perpetrator of the stabbing operation in Brussels is one of the soldiers of the Islamic State, and he carried out the operation in response to appeals to target countries of the [US-led] coalition".

The Belgian Secretary of Interior, Jan Jambon, praised the soldiers and the police.

General Marc Thys, commander of Belgian land forces, said that "uniforms are a target" and that his forces would change tactics to adapt to the threat, and later said the military expected to have to continue patrolling the streets until 2020.

Europol classified the incident as jihadist terrorism in its report about terrorism in Europe during 2017.

== See also ==
- 2016 stabbing of Charleroi police officers
- 2016 stabbing of Brussels police officers
- June 2017 Brussels attack
- Islamic terrorism in Europe
