= 2017 Brussels-Central bombing =

Attempted terror attack in the Belgium capital

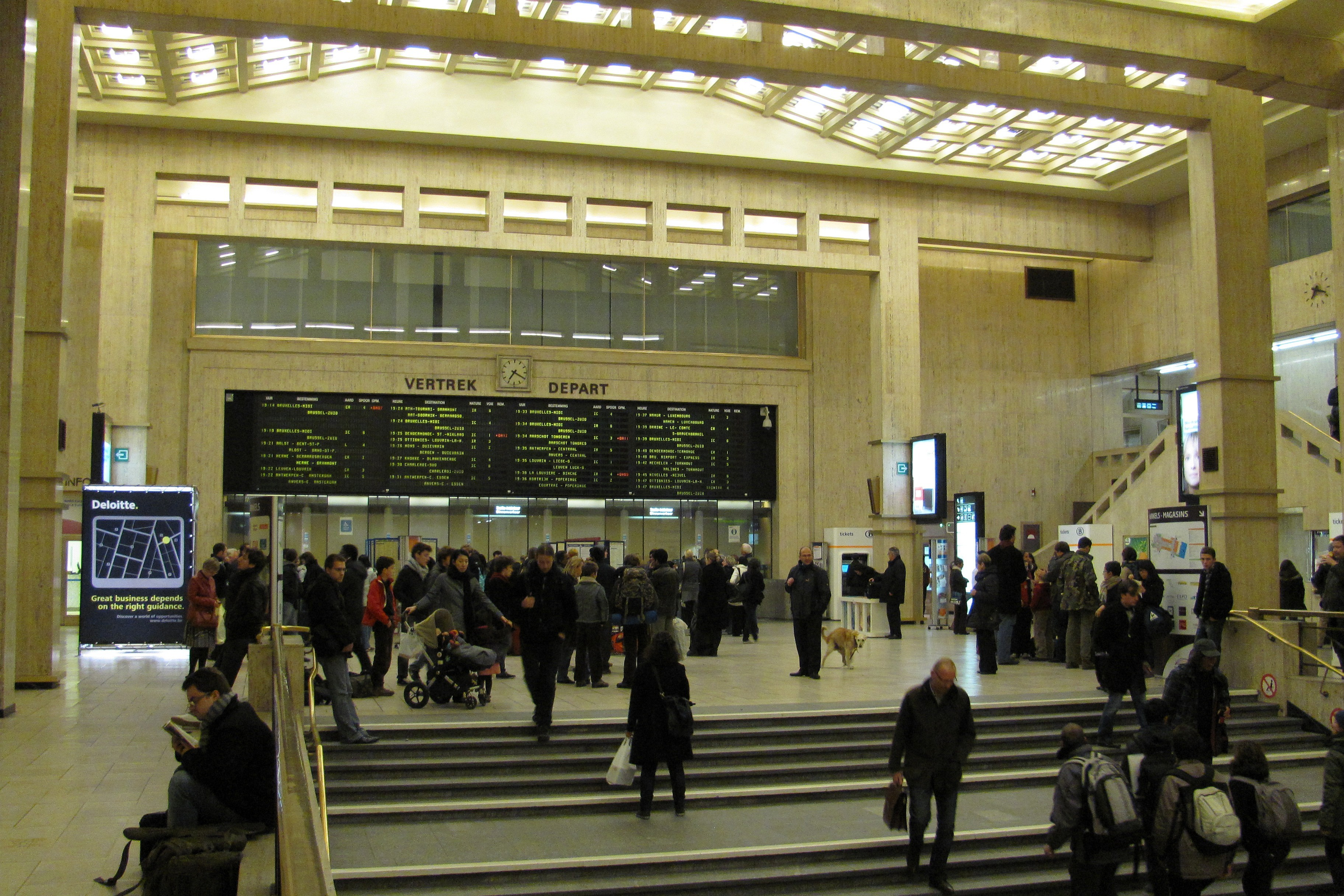
- Brussels-Central railway station in 2010
- Location: 50.8454°N 4.3568°E; Brussels-Central railway station in Brussels, Belgium
- Date: 20 June 2017; 9 years ago 20:45 (UTC+2)
- Attack type: Bombing
- Deaths: 1 (the attacker)
- Injuries: 0
- Perpetrator: Oussama Zariouh
- Motive: Islamic extremism

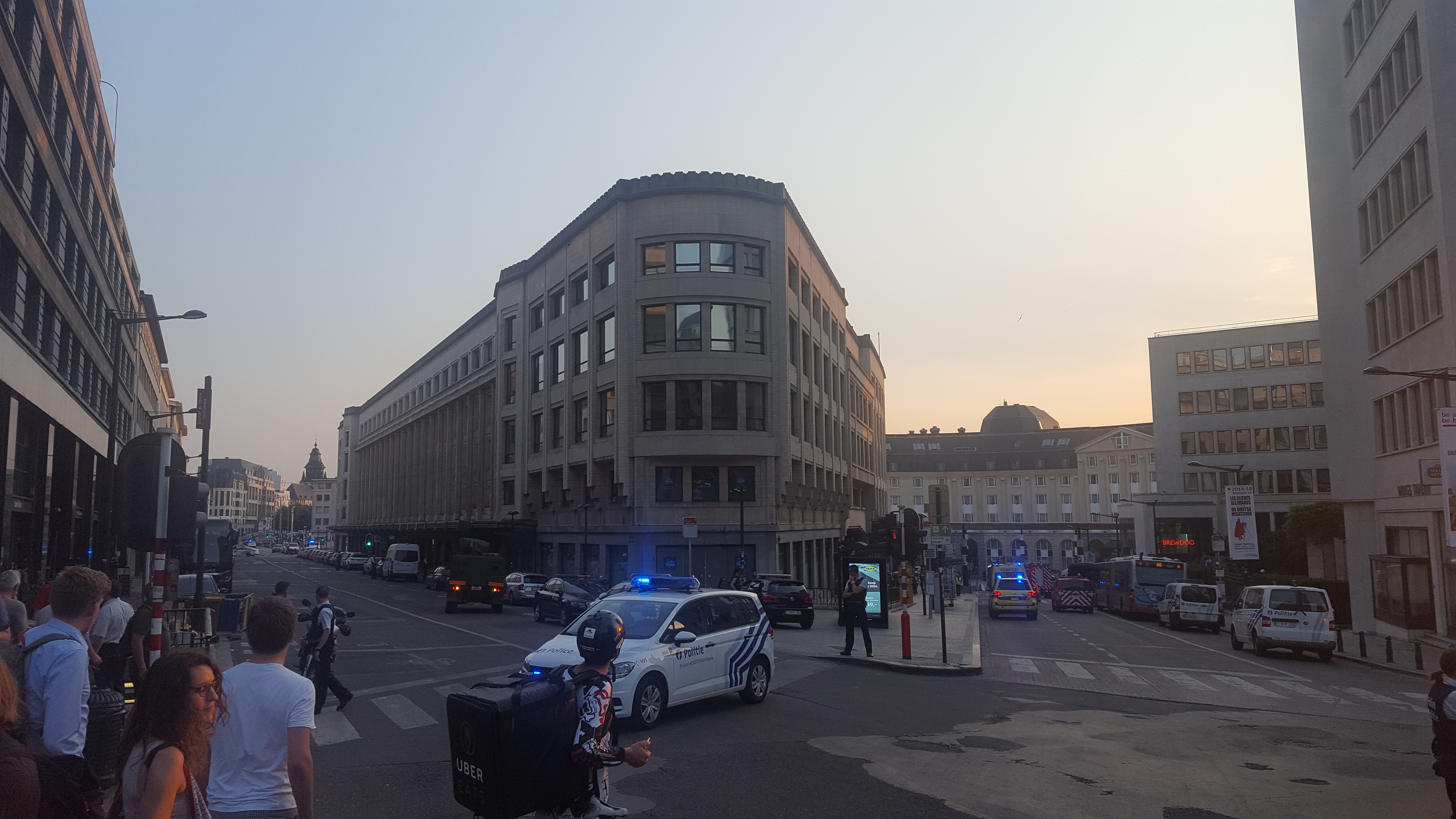
Police closing the area around Brussels-Central railway station

On 20 June 2017, a terrorist bomb caused a small explosion at Brussels-Central railway station in Brussels, Belgium; there were no casualties. Soldiers patrolling the station subsequently killed the suspect with three to four shots, according to eyewitnesses. The perpetrator was Oussama Zariouh, a 36-year-old Moroccan national who lived in the Molenbeek municipality and who had assembled a defective explosive device.

== Background ==
After the Paris attacks that killed 130 people in 2015 and the Brussels bombings of 2016 that killed 32 civilians, soldiers were on patrol in Brussels to increase security. The Molenbeek municipality, where many of the perpetrators of the 2016 bombings lived, underwent a large-scale administrative check-up, with over 20,000 inhabitants being checked by law enforcement agencies.

== Incident ==
At 20:39, a 36-year-old male entered Brussels-Central railway station and descended the central stairs in the main hall, approaching a cluster of ten travelers at the bottom of the stairs. At 20:44, the man was seen isolating himself from others, then moving towards the cluster of travelers again, appearing to be nervous. He was heard yelling, and attempted to detonate a luggage trolley. Testimonies of eyewitnesses and a photograph taken by a witness indicate a small incendiary device detonated, with limited explosive force, but with a loud "bang". The size of the explosion suggests the device failed to function as intended, possibly as a result of poor manufacturing. According to the magistrate, the man was heard shouting "Allahu Akbar" after setting off the explosion and before being shot dead. The perpetrator had received no training in handling explosives, and taught himself how to construct explosive devices. The explosive used was TATP, the same compound used during the 2016 bombings, the Parsons Green bombing, and the 2017 Stockholm truck attack.

As the trolley caught fire, he proceeded down the escalators towards the platforms, causing travelers to flee onto the train tracks. The burning luggage exploded a second time, due to gas bottles it contained. This second explosion was reported more powerful than the first one, but due to the time elapsed after the first explosion, no one was injured because travelers had the chance to clear the area. Shrapnel contained around the charge indicates the device was intended to cause as much injury as possible, but the device did not reach the intended maximum yield because of construction flaws.

Upon returning to the main hall, the confused suspect was spotted by soldiers alerted by the explosions. He shouted "Allahu Akbar!" a second time and engaged military personnel unarmed. The soldiers opened fire and killed him. It remained unclear for hours whether he had survived or not. Because he was perceived to be wearing a "rucksack and bomb belt" and wiring was visible under his clothes, the body was not approached until the bomb squad of the Belgian Army, DOVO, arrived with a robot to inspect the body and confirm his death. The Belgian Flemish broadcaster VRT initially reported that the body was booby-trapped, but it did not report that he was not wearing a bomb on his body.

According to Belgian authorities, the carnage "could have been severe had the bomb, full of nails and gas canisters, detonated properly."

== Perpetrator ==
The attacker, identified as Oussama Zariouh (alt: Usamah Zaryuh) was a 36-year-old Moroccan national who had moved from his home country to Belgium in 2002 and had been living in Molenbeek since 2013. He was only known to police for sexual misconduct, but had no identified ties to terrorism. A neighbor described the man as a silent and reserved individual who rarely received visitors.

The Belgian Federal Prosecution Office stated that the attacker had "sympathies for the terrorist organization Islamic State", evidenced by documents found at his house.

Zariouh had not received training for handling explosives or constructing explosive devices, which is required for the effective use of TATP in bombs according to terrorism expert Peter Bergen. Kenneth Lasoen, a security and intelligence expert at the University of Ghent, concurred. "He did not know what he was doing. If this had been Daesh (Islamic State), he would have had better instructions about how to do this awful act." He is believed to have constructed the hydrogen-peroxide-based explosive TATP on his own in his Molenbeek apartment.

Almost a month after the attack, an article appeared in Rumiyah, the ISIS magazine, claiming Zariouh as a "soldier of the caliphate".

== Aftermath ==
The incident was treated by prosecutors as "attempted terrorist murder". Immediately after the incident police, aided by soldiers from the Belgian army, swept the station and set up a secure perimeter around the station. Brussels-North railway station was closed as a precaution, and multiple suspicious luggage items were inspected. All train traffic between the North and South stations was suspended, and the metro service was also temporarily halted. Guests of the nearby Hilton hotel were evacuated, but allowed to return to their rooms around 23:30. The Grand-Place/Grote Markt (Brussels' main square) was briefly partially locked down. On the nearby Rue du Marché aux Herbes/Grasmarkt, another explosion could be heard as a result of a controlled detonation of a suspected vehicle by the Belgian bomb squad.

The incident was used as an argument by advocates of stronger civil oversight within the Belgian political establishment to extend the mandate of soldiers patrolling the major cities in Belgium. A campaign was launched on social media to compliment the involved soldiers on their efficient resolution of the incident, although because the "rucksack and a bomb belt" he was seen to be wearing turned out not to be contain explosives, the presence of soldiers around the station —one of whom shot him—turned out to have had very little impact on the damage caused by the attack.

=== Wider context ===
The attack was understood by analysts at The Washington Post, The Wall Street Journal, and The New York Times as part of a shift in ISIS tactics as the group experienced an ongoing loss of territorial control in Syria and a concomitant loss in the capacity to train and dispatch operatives to commit attacks on foreign soil. The Washington Post described this as a move towards the use of "inexperienced perpetrators who act alone, without apparent direction or training."

Writing in Behavioral Sciences of Terrorism and Political Aggression, Paige V. Pascarelli discussed this bombing as part of an exploration of the reasons why the Moroccan immigrant community in Belgium has produced a disproportionately large number of jihadists in contrast with the similarly poorly integrated and economically unsuccessful Turkish immigrant community.

Thomas Renard of the EGMONT - The Royal Institute for International Relations in Brussels called Zariouh "the new face of jihad in Europe."

== See also ==
- 2016 Brussels bombings
- 2016 stabbing of Brussels police officers
- Jewish Museum of Belgium shooting
- 2015 New Year's attack plots
- Terrorism in the European Union
- August 2017 Brussels attack
- 2017 New York City Subway bombing
