= 2016 Brussels stabbing attacks =

Terrorist incident in Belgium

- Location: Schaerbeek, Belgium
- Date: 5 October 2016 (UTC+02:00)
- Target: Police officers
- Attack type: Stabbing, Islamic terrorism
- Weapon: Machete
- Deaths: 0
- Injuries: 4 (including the assistant)
- Assailant: Hicham Diop

On 5 October 2016, three police officers were attacked by a man wielding a machete in the Schaerbeek municipality of Brussels, Belgium. Two of them suffered stab wounds, while the third was physically assaulted but otherwise uninjured. The suspected assailant, a Belgian citizen named Hicham Diop, was apprehended and charged with attempted terrorism-related murder and participating in a terrorist group.

He soon told police that his brother, Aboubaker Diop, had also been involved, and the latter was also arrested.

== Background ==
Prior to the stabbing, Schaerbeek and the nearby municipality of Molenbeek had already become known as "a hotbed of jihadism" in Brussels. It was there where the perpetrators of the March 2016 Brussels bombings and some of the perpetrators of the November 2015 Paris attacks were based. Schaerbeek was the home of the taxi driver who drove the suspects to Brussels Airport. They raided the home and found a nail bomb, 15 kilograms (33 lb) of acetone peroxide, hydrogen peroxide, and an ISIL flag. Inside a waste container near the house they also found a computer belonging to Ibrahim El Bakraoui who is believed to have carried out suicide bombings during the attacks along with his brother.

The stabbing came nearly two months after a similar stabbing attack in Charleroi, in which an Algerian citizen stabbed two police officers; and nearly one month after another similar attack in Molenbeek, in which a man of North African origin slightly injured two police officers. At the time of the stabbing, Brussels was on a high terror alert.

ISIS has used social media to inspire sympathizers in Western countries to target police and soldiers for attack on the grounds that they represent the state.

The attack was one of a series of attacks on Belgian police officers in 2016, including the stabbing of two officers on 7 September in Molenbeek and the 6 August 2016 stabbing of Charleroi police officers. Christopher Dickey describes this attack as part of a pattern of jihadist attacks in which there have been, "many small incidents and thwarted ones, then suddenly one or two high-casualty attacks" in Europe since 2014.

The attack occurred as a summit of world leaders, including American Secretary of State John Kerry, met in Brussels to discuss Afghanistan.

== Attack ==
The attack reportedly occurred during an identity check on the Boulevard Lambermont/Lambermontlaan, a busy main road in Schaerbeek. A man, armed with a machete, lunged for two police officers; one was stabbed in the stomach and the other in the neck, but neither was seriously injured. Afterwards, the attacker fled the scene, but encountered a third officer nearby and got into a violent struggle, which resulted in Diop, a former professional boxer, slugging the officer and giving him a broken nose. The officer then shot and wounded the attacker with a single shot to the leg. According to an eyewitness, the attacker shouted something in Arabic after being shot.

== Suspect ==
The suspect, Hicham Diop (43), was at first identified only as Hicham D. by police and media. According to Belgian media, he was a 43-year-old Belgium Army veteran and former boxer who was discharged in 2009 and was previously known to police and to security services for his contacts with extremist Islamists. He was also believed to have links to jihadists who traveled to Syria. A married man with young children, Diop once stood for a seat in a regional parliament, but lost the election. His home was searched by Belgian police, which recovered no weapons.

A spokesman for the federal prosecutor said there was "reason to believe that [the stabbing] is terror-related", but did not initially elaborate. Hicham D. was charged with attempted terrorism-related attempted murder and participating in a terrorist group. His 46-year-old brother, Aboubaker Diop, was also arrested and charged with participating in a terrorist group.

In 2011, Aboubaker and Hicham were involved in an incident involving the official police vehicle of a security officer.

Also in 2015, the brothers were arrested for fighting in an incident involving shots fired at a Kinepolis security guard. The defense asserted that the incident was a family quarrel relating to events that occurred years ago in Senegal.

Hicham Diop stood for election on the list of an Islamist party.

The brothers are part of a family that migrated to Belgium from Senegal. Hicham was a kickboxer.

== Legal proceedings ==
=== Hicham Diop ===
Hicham Diop has been charged with attempted murder in a terrorist context, deliberate intentional assault, violations of arms legislation and armed rebellion. According to Belgian police, Hicham made terrorism related statements as he was being interrogated. He was known to police for having been in contact with Islamic extremists.

An additional set of charges was filed in June 2017 for threatening two officers with death as they transported him to the police station following his arrest for assault in October 2016.

In September 2017, a federal prosecutor asked that Diop be sentenced to 15 years' prison. In April 2018, Diop was officially sentenced to 15 years for the attack.

=== Aboubaker Diop ===
Aboubaker Diop, born in 1970, a Belgian national has been charged with "participation in the activities of a terrorist group."

== Reactions ==
Belgian Interior Minister Jan Jambon tweeted a statement after the attack, expressing his support for police officers in Schaerbeek.

In a speech in February 2017, Donald Trump stated that the media was not reporting on terrorist attacks. Later that day, the administration included this stabbing attack in a list of 78 attacks which the admin said were "under-reported". It was not clear what "under-reported" meant, or what criteria were used to compile the list. News organizations stated that they had indeed covered most of the incidents in the list, some of them extensively. Politifact rated Donald Trump's claim as false.

== See also ==
- Islamic terrorism in Europe
- Stabbing as a terrorist tactic
- 2016 stabbing of Charleroi police officers
- 2018 Liège shooting
- List of terrorist incidents in Belgium
