= Suzan Daniel Bridge =

Bridge in Brussels, Belgium

Suzan Daniel Bridge: Pont Suzan Daniel (French); Suzan Danielbrug (Dutch)
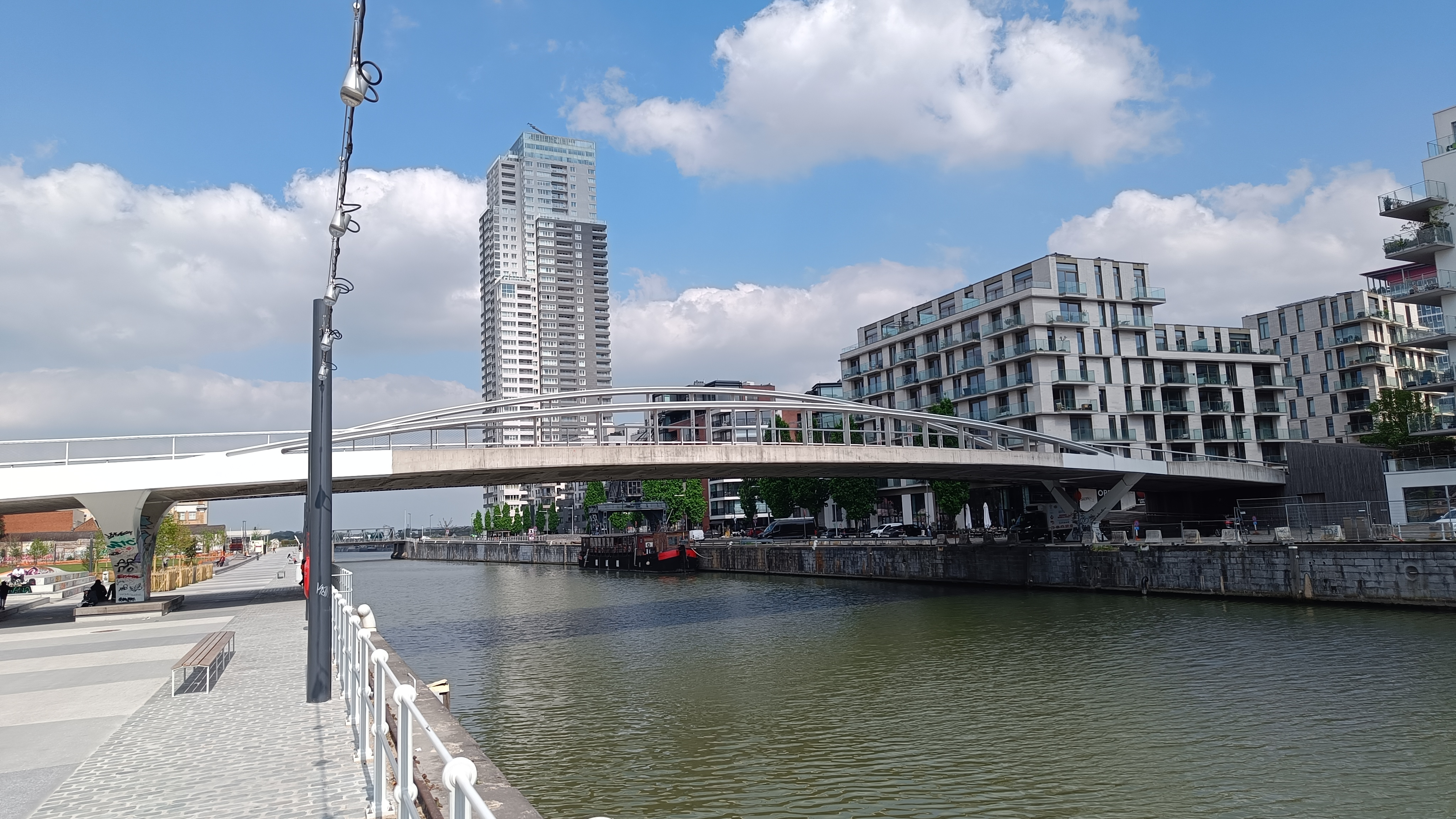
- Coordinates: 50°51′44.73″N 4°20′58.82″E
- Crosses: Brussels Canal and Beco Park
- Locale: Brussels, Belgium
- Other name: Picard Bridge
- Named for: Suzan Daniel
- Owner: Brussels-Capital Region
- Maintained by: Brussels Mobility

History
- Designer: Bureau Greisch
- Construction start: 2018
- Construction end: 2022
- Inaugurated: 4 October 2022; 3 years ago

Location
- Interactive map of Suzan Daniel Bridge

The Suzan Daniel Bridge (French: Pont Suzan Daniel; Dutch: Suzan Danielbrug) is a bridge crossing the Brussels Canal and Beco Park in Brussels, Belgium. Opened in 2022 to designs by Bureau Greisch, it connects the Rue Picard/Picardstraat on the border of Tour & Taxis and the Maritime Quarter of Molenbeek-Saint-Jean on the west side to the Boulevard Simon Bolivar/Simon Bolivarlaan in the Northern Quarter on the east side.

The bridge is named in honour of the lesbian activist Suzan Daniel, who helped found the gay rights movement in Belgium.

== See also ==
- History of Brussels
