= Beco Park =

Park in Brussels, Belgium

- Parc Béco (French); Becopark (Dutch)
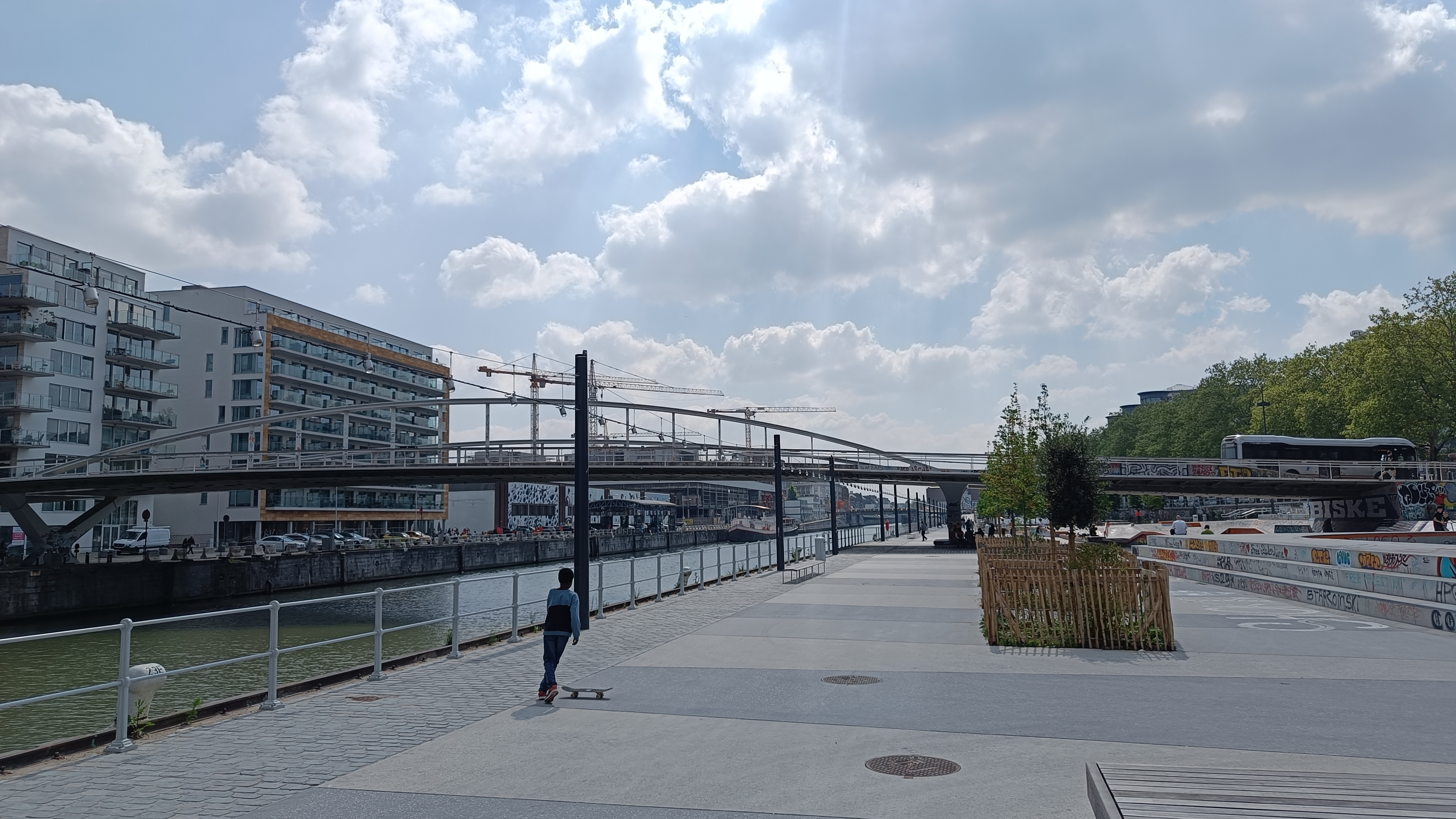
- Beco Park with the Suzan Daniel Bridge in the background
- Interactive map of Beco Park
- Type: Urban park
- Location: Tour & Taxis, City of Brussels, Brussels-Capital Region, Belgium
- Coordinates: 50°51′46″N 4°20′58″E
- Area: 3 ha (7.4 acres)
- Status: Open year-round
- Water: Bassin Béco/Becodok

Beco Park (French: Parc Béco; Dutch: Becopark) is an urban public park located along the Brussels Canal, on the border between the City of Brussels and the Molenbeek-Saint-Jean municipality of Brussels, Belgium. The park comprises the Quai des Matériaux/Materialenkaai and the Quai Béco/Becokaai, along the Avenue du Port/Havenlaan, and covers 3 ha (7.4 acres). Once a key logistical hub for the city's construction industry, the site has since been redeveloped into a contemporary public green space and is crossed by the Suzan Daniel Bridge.

== Toponymy ==
The name Quai des Matériaux (in French) or Materialenkaai (in Dutch), meaning "Materials Quay", reflects the site's historical function as a location for storing and transporting construction materials. It was officially designated by a decision of Brussels' municipal council on 15 January 1909, alongside the opposite Quai des Péniches/Akenkaai, during a period of expansion and development of the port infrastructure. Before this, the quay was part of the undeveloped canal banks linked to the creation of the Bassin de Jonction/Verbindingsdok (now the Bassin Béco/Becodok) in 1905. The latter gives its name to the Quai Béco/Becokaai ("Beco Quay") and the current park.

== History ==
=== Early history ===
The Quai des Matériaux/Materialenkaai and the Quai Béco/Becokaai were established in the early 20th century, following the completion of the Bassin de Jonction/Verbindingsdok (now known as the Bassin Béco/Becodok) in 1905. Their strategic position on the Brussels Canal made them an essential hub for the import, storage, and distribution of materials such as timber, sand, and stone resources vital for building the modern city. The site was dominated by warehouses, open storage areas, and industrial infrastructure, all dedicated to facilitating the flow of goods into the heart of the capital.

In the 1970s and 1980s, the Quai des Matériaux gained notoriety as the location of the "bunker", which served as the headquarters for the Front de la Jeunesse (FJ), a violent far-right movement active during that period. As the importance of waterborne freight diminished in the late 20th century, the site gradually fell into disuse. Many of its industrial features were demolished, leaving large expanses of concrete and underutilised urban space.

=== Redevelopment ===
Recognising the potential for urban renewal, the Brussels-Capital Region launched an ambitious redevelopment plan in the late 2010s. In 2014, Brussels Environment, in collaboration with Toestand, a non-profit association that reactivates vacant spaces for socio-cultural use, initiated a temporary occupation project named Allée du Kaai. This initiative aimed to foster social and cultural activities in anticipation of the site's permanent redevelopment. The project was notably successful, attracting approximately 35,000 visitors annually and involving over 40 associations and collectives.

In 2019, work was scheduled to begin on converting the disused quays into a public green space. However, the project faced significant delays due to severe soil contamination. The site, spanning approximately 28,000 m^{2} (300,000 sq ft), had been used for various industrial activities, leading to complex pollution issues that required extensive analysis and remediation. Experts had to identify suitable decontamination technologies that were both environmentally effective and financially feasible. This unforeseen challenge postponed the project's completion from the initially planned 2021 to 2024.

Once the contamination issues were addressed, construction commenced in September 2022. The goal was to address the scarcity of parks in the densely populated Maritime Quarter while enhancing the quality of life and reconnecting residents with the canal. The resulting park was developed by Brussels Environment, with contributions from urban planning agency perspective.brussels and local community input.

Beco Park was designed to serve a variety of public needs and now spans 3 ha (7.4 acres). It features a sports zone near the Square Sainctelette/Sainctelettesquare, a public garden, a large skatepark integrated under the Suzan Daniel Bridge, and an open lawn area directly across from Tour & Taxis. The final section of the park opened in November 2024, completing the transformation of a post-industrial site into a vibrant public space. The park now serves as an important green link in Brussels' evolving canal-side landscape. In 2026, it won the Public Space Prize at the Public Space Congress in Bruges.

== See also ==
- List of parks and gardens in Brussels
- List of streets in Brussels
- History of Brussels
- Belgium in the long nineteenth century
