= Jubilee Bridge =

Jubilee Bridge may refer to:

== Australia ==
- Jubilee Bridge, pre-completion name of the Story Bridge in Brisbane
- Jubilee Bridge (Innisfail), connecting Innisfail and East Innisfail, Queensland
- Jubilee Bridge, Southport, connecting Southport with Main Beach on the Gold Coast, Queensland

== India ==
- Jubilee Bridge (India), in West Bengal
- Silver Jubilee Railway Bridge Bharuch, over the river Narmada

== United Kingdom ==
=== England ===
- Golden Jubilee Bridges, a pair of pedestrian bridges in London
- Jubilee Bridge, official name of the Walney Bridge, in Barrow-in-Furness, Cumbria
- Jubilee Bridge, a footbridge connecting Matlock Bath to Lovers' Walks in Derbyshire
- Silver Jubilee Bridge, in Halton
- Tees Jubilee Bridge, in Stockton-on-Tees

=== Scotland ===
- Jubilee Bridge, Tay near Dunkeld

=== Wales ===
- Jubilee Bridge (Queensferry), in Wales

== Elsewhere ==
- Jubilee Bridge, Brussels, a road-and-foot-traffic bridge over Tour & Taxis Park
- Jubilee Bridge, Singapore, a pedestrian bridge in Singapore
- Jubilee Bridge of the Emperor Franz Josef I, original name of the Dragon Bridge (Ljubljana) in Slovenia
- Victoria Jubilee Bridge, prior name of the Victoria Bridge (Montreal) in Canada
