= Suzan Daniel =

Belgian activist

Suzan Daniel (born Suzanne De Pues; Brussels 1918 – Uccle 15 November 2007) was a Belgian lesbian activist. She was the founder of the first lesbian and gay group in Belgium.

== Biography ==
Suzan Daniel was the first female film critic in Belgium. She chose her alias in reference to actress Danielle Darrieux's first name. From the 1930s, she was immersed in Brussels' gay community, in which she gradually took on a leading role.

In 1953, after attending the International Committee for Sexual Equality in Amsterdam, she founded the Centre culturel de Belgique/Cultuur Centrum België (or CCB, "Belgium's cultural Center"), Belgium's first lesbian and gay society. The group did not focus on political activism but rather on providing gay people with cultural activities and opportunities to meet each other. In doing so, she kickstarted Belgium's gay and lesbian movement. She sat at the group's board for a year. Being the only woman in a management team comprised almost exclusively of men, she experienced so much sexism that she left the association a year after founding it. She consecutively withdrew from the queer community as a whole, disappearing from public life.

As soon as Suzan Daniel left the group in 1954, the remaining men renamed it Centre de loisirs et culture ("Leasure and Culture Center"). The center, which used to gather people of all genders from both Dutch- and French-speaking communities, gradually became mostly male and francophone.

== Legacy ==
In 1996, a homosexual archive was created and named in her honor: the Fonds Suzan Daniel. It is held at the Amsab - Instituut voor Sociale Geschiedenis Gent.

In 2019, a new bridge crossing the Willebroeck Canal and connecting Tour & Taxis to Brussels-North railway station was named after her.
