= Willebroek =

- Municipality
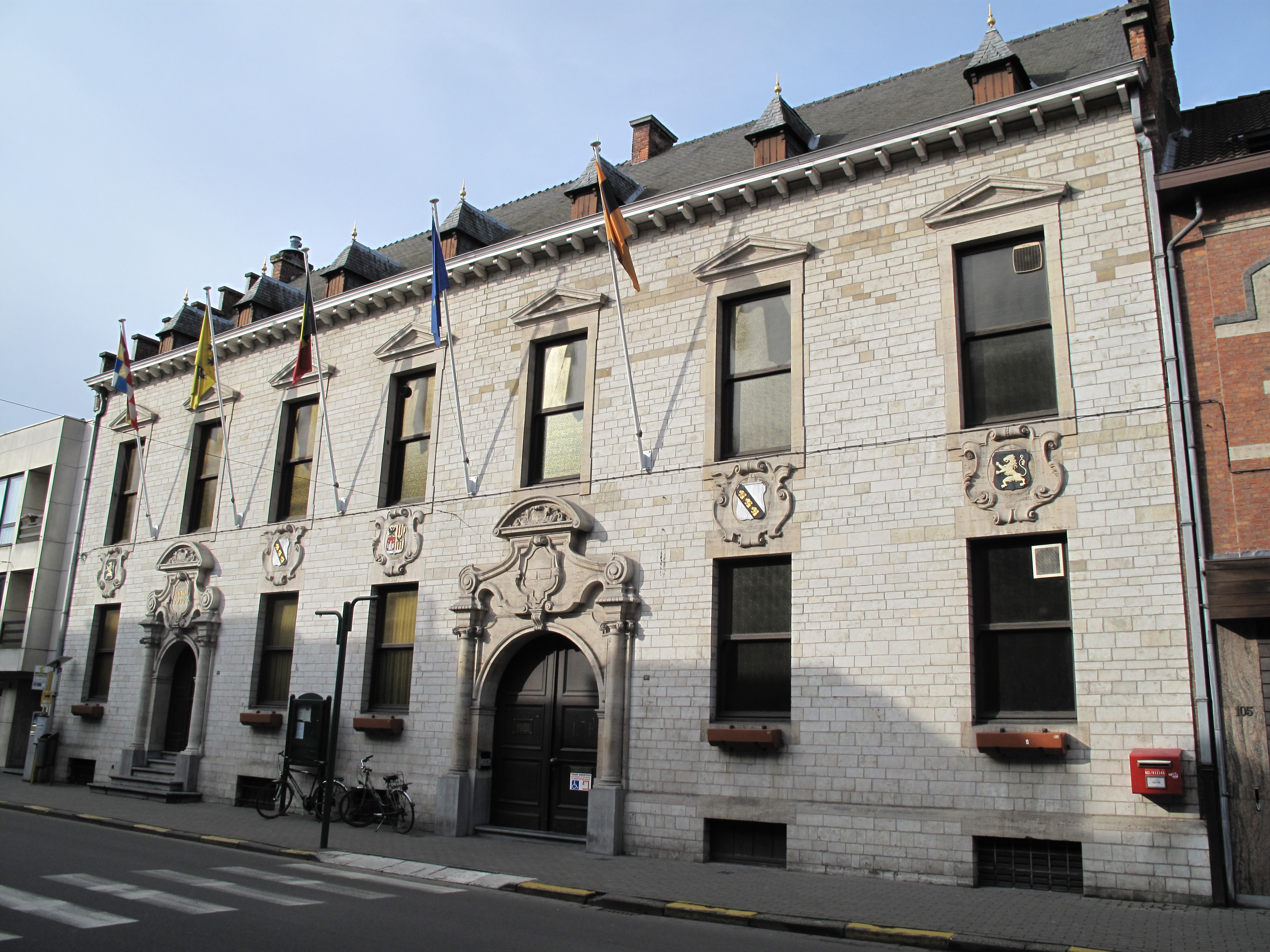
- Old willebroek town hall

- Flag Coat of arms

- Location of Willebroek in the province of Antwerp
- Interactive map of Willebroek
- Location in Belgium
- Coordinates: 51°04′N 04°22′E
- Country: Belgium
- Community: Flemish Community
- Region: Flemish Region
- Province: Antwerp
- Arrondissement: Mechelen

Government
  - Mayor: Eddy Bevers (N-VA)
  - Governing parties: N-VA, Groen, Open VLD

Area
  - Total: 27.37 km^{2} (10.57 sq mi)

Population (2018-01-01)
  - Total: 26,223
  - Density: 958.1/km^{2} (2,481/sq mi)
- Postal codes: 2830
- NIS code: 12040
- Area codes: 03
- Website: www.willebroek.be

Willebroek (Dutch pronunciation: [ˈʋɪləbruk], old spelling: Willebroeck, also French: Willebrouck) is a municipality located in the Belgian province of Antwerp. The municipality comprises the towns of Blaasveld, Heindonk, Tisselt, Klein Willebroek, and Willebroek proper. In 2021, Willebroek had a total population of 27,081. The total area is 27.41 km^{2}.

Willebroek is linked to Brussels by the Willebroek Canal.

Willebroek is also home to the Kanaalfeesten, a yearly festival that takes place throughout the town which includes live concerts (mostly of local bands) and general festival attractions, like a mini roller coaster, a duck shoot, etc. At Klein-Willebroek the Harmonium Art museuM on pump organs is established in the former Church of the Immaculate Conception.

Its iconic bridge over the Willebroek Canal was infamous for the traffic jams it caused, even making it the subject of a song: De Brug van Willebroek by Wannes Van de Velde.

== See also ==
- Fort Breendonk
