= Maritime Quarter, Brussels =

Neighbourhood in Brussels, Belgium

Maritime Quarter: Quartier Maritime (French); Maritiemwijk (Dutch)
- Neighbourhood
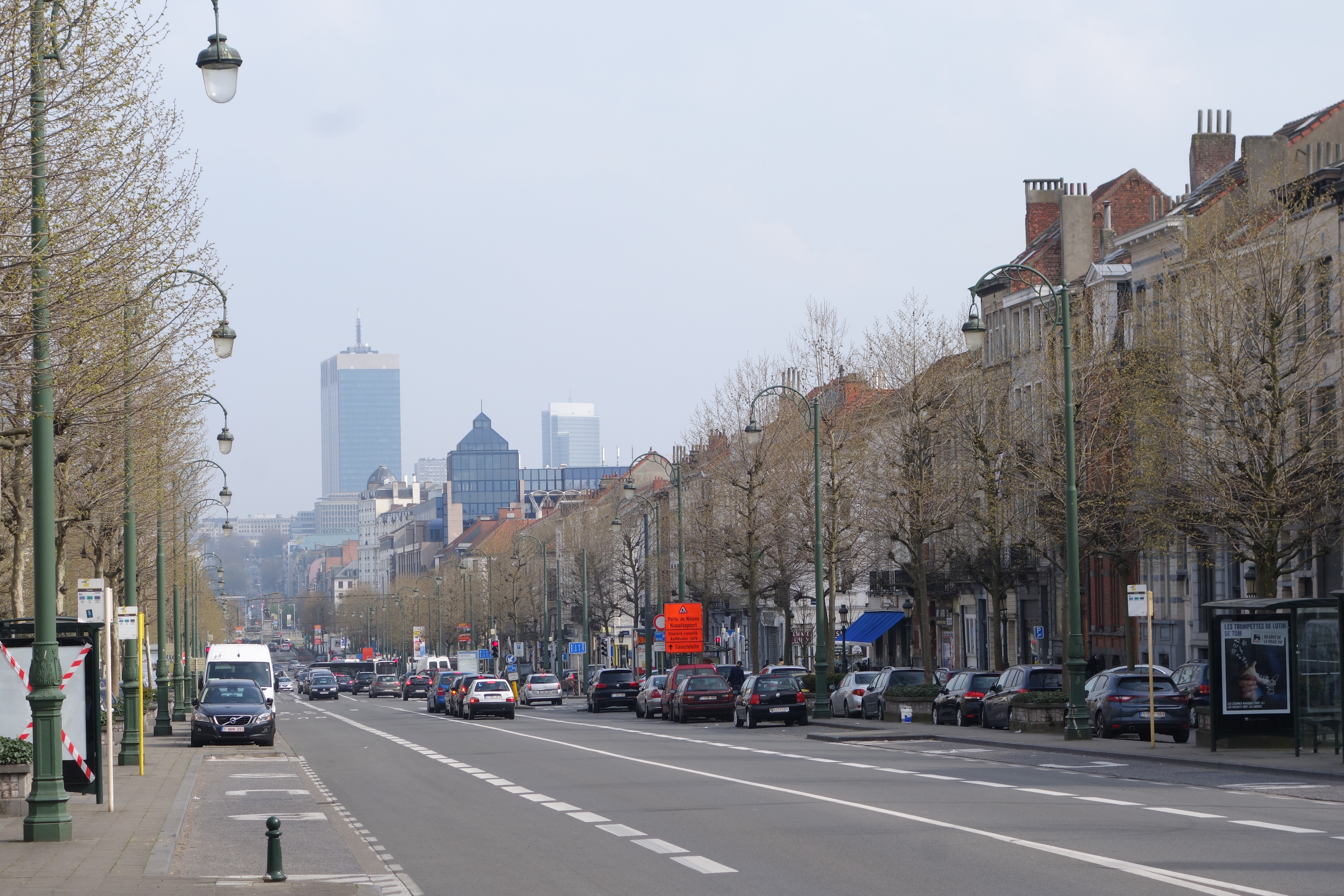
- Boulevard Léopold II/Leopold II-laan

- Location within Brussels Maritime Quarter (Belgium)
- Coordinates: 50°51′51″N 4°20′16″E
- Country: Belgium
- Region: Brussels-Capital Region
- Arrondissement: Brussels-Capital
- Municipality: City of Brussels; Molenbeek-Saint-Jean
- Time zone: UTC+1 (CET)
  - Summer (DST): UTC+2 (CEST)
- Postal code: 1000, 1080
- Area codes: 02

The Maritime Quarter (French: Quartier Maritime; Dutch: Maritiemwijk) is a quarter of Brussels, Belgium. Located in the north of the municipality of Molenbeek-Saint-Jean, with a piece extending into the City of Brussels, it lies adjacent to the Brussels Canal and forms part of the broader Canal Zone (French: Zone Canal; Dutch: Kanaalzone), an area that has long served as a logistical and economic artery for the city.

The Maritime Quarter developed in the early 20th century as a hub for port-related industries, warehousing, and working-class housing. Over time, the area experienced industrial decline, followed by periods of urban decay. However, in recent decades, it has become the focus of revitalisation programmes. Nowadays, it is home to a diverse population and is characterised by a mix of industrial heritage and modern development.

The district is crossed by the Boulevard Léopold II/Leopold II-laan running east–west, and is bounded to the east by the canal, to the north by Tour & Taxis, to the west by the railway line and to the south by the historical centre of Molenbeek. It is served by Ribaucourt metro station on lines 2 and 6 of the Brussels Metro.

== History ==
The Maritime Quarter was born, around 1900, from the implementation of the Port of Brussels and the Maritime Station (French: Gare Maritime, Dutch: Maritiem Station), a freight station on the Tour & Taxis site. A number of customs agencies and handling activities mingled with homes were concentrated there and have given the neighbourhood a diverse character. The residents, historically made up of workers, as well as of the small and large bourgeoisie, were also from the outset of great diversity.

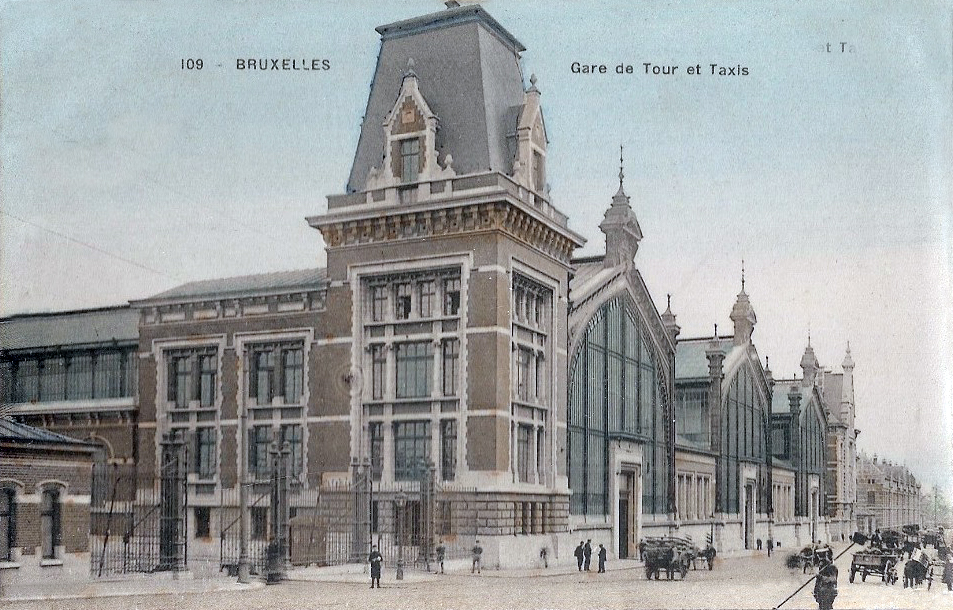
The Maritime Station, Tour & Taxis, c. 1910

In the interwar period, the Foyer Molenbeekois/Molenbeekse Haard housing cooperative built several large-scale social housing complexes for workers and employees in the district. Many traces of this history can still be found today, including old factories and workshops, as well as Art Deco and modernist apartment buildings, designed by architects such as Joseph Diongre, Armand de Saulnier and François Van Meulecom.

From the 1950s, most industrial activities ceased and the neighbourhood became impoverished. By the 1960s, a population decline had begun. New, poorer populations moved into the abandoned houses: first Spaniards, then Italians, then Moroccans and Turks, and more recently people from Sub-Saharan Africa and Eastern Europe. Since the 1970s, the authorities have taken steps to reduce poverty by renovating and demolishing substandard housing and encouraging new construction. In the mid-1990s, a comprehensive approach was implemented, taking into account the needs of these population groups, so they could also benefit from the district's revitalisation.

In the 21st century, the Maritime Quarter has become the focus of significant urban renewal programmes aimed at improving the area's infrastructure, promoting social cohesion, and attracting new cultural and economic activity. On 4 May 2025, clashes broke out in several districts of Brussels, including the Maritime Quarter, during a Belgian Cup football match between Club Brugge KV and R.S.C. Anderlecht at the King Baudouin Stadium.

== Sights ==
- The Church of St. Remigius, located on the Boulevard du Jubilé/Jubelfeestlaan, a neo-Gothic building completed in 1907.
- The Jubilee Bridge, designed in 1904 by the engineer Frédéric Bruneel, which connects the Boulevard du Jubilé to the Boulevard Émile Bockstael/Emile Bockstaellaan over Tour & Taxis Park.
- The monument dedicated to the heroes of the First World War, designed by the sculptor Georges Vandevoorde and the architect Lucien François, and completed in 1925–26. It is located in the centre of the Square des Libérateurs/Bevrijderssquare, along the Boulevard du Jubilé.
- The Vaartkapoen statue, designed by the sculptor Tom Frantzen in 1985, on the Place Sainctelette/Sainctelettesquare.
- The impressive buildings of the former goods station of Tour & Taxis and the surrounding area bordering the neighbourhood, which are being turned into residences, as well as commercial enterprises.
- Brussels' Circus School, installed in the buildings of Tour & Taxis.
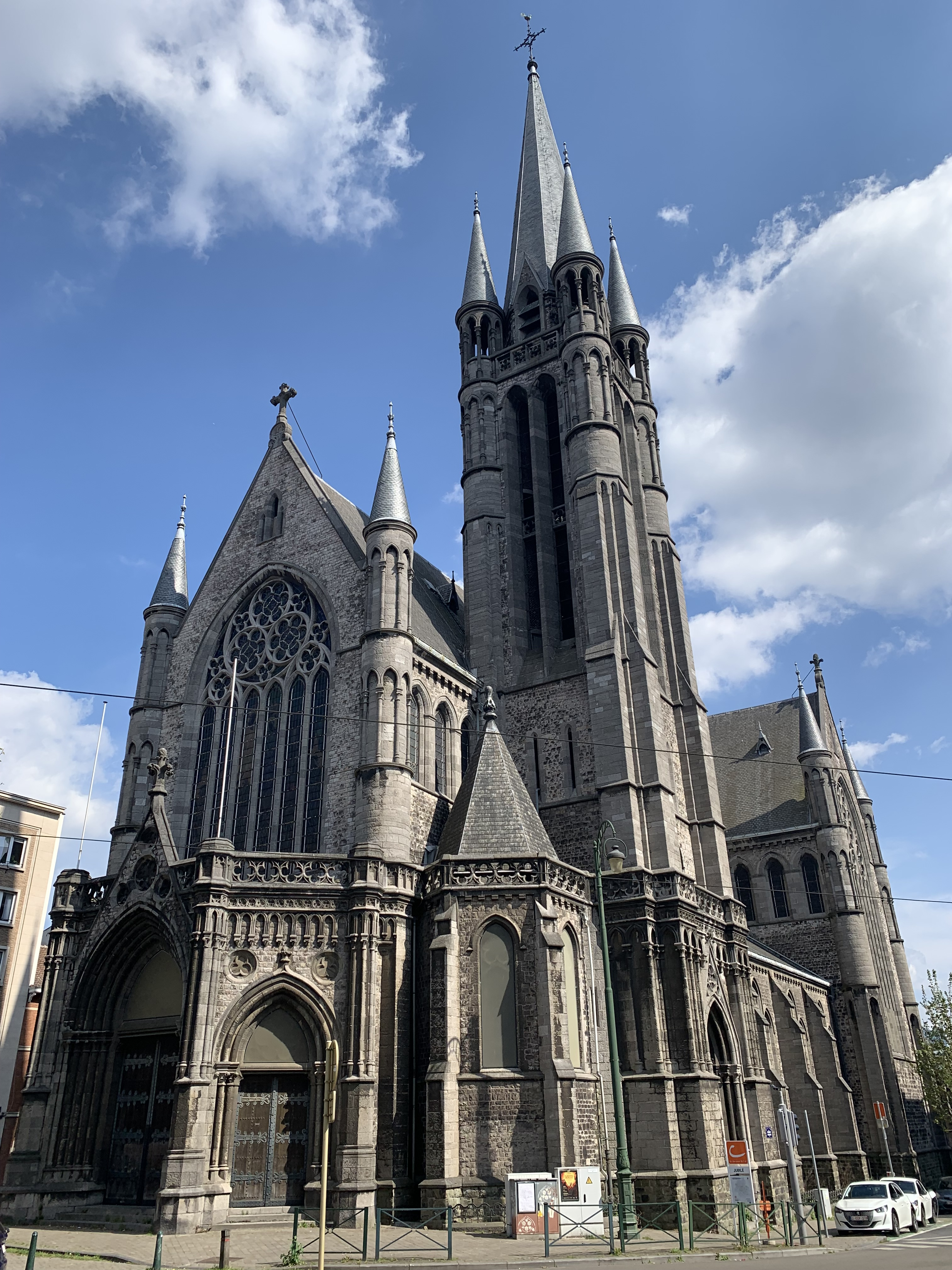
Church of St. Remigius

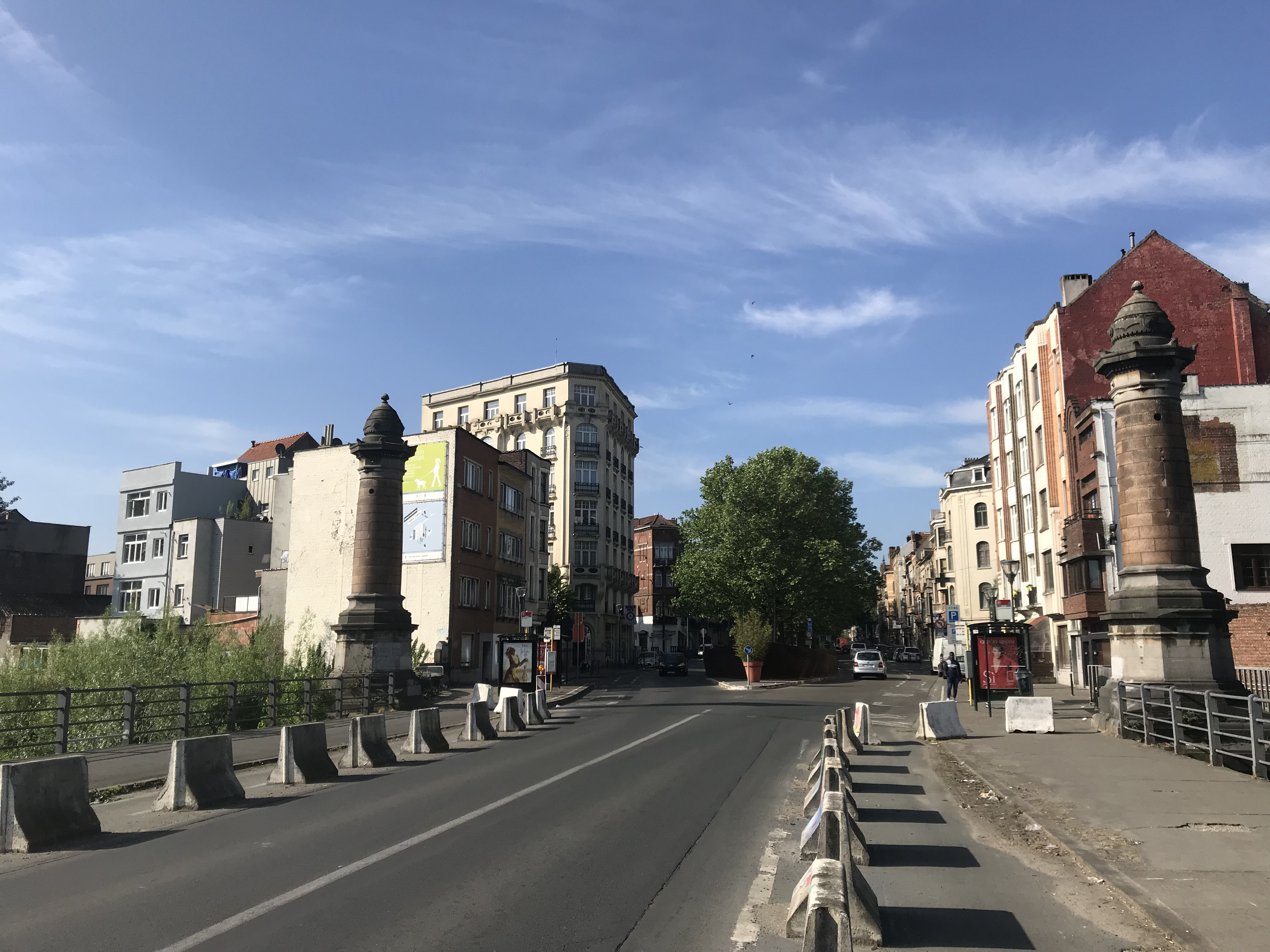
Jubilee Bridge on the Boulevard du Jubilé/Jubelfeestlaan

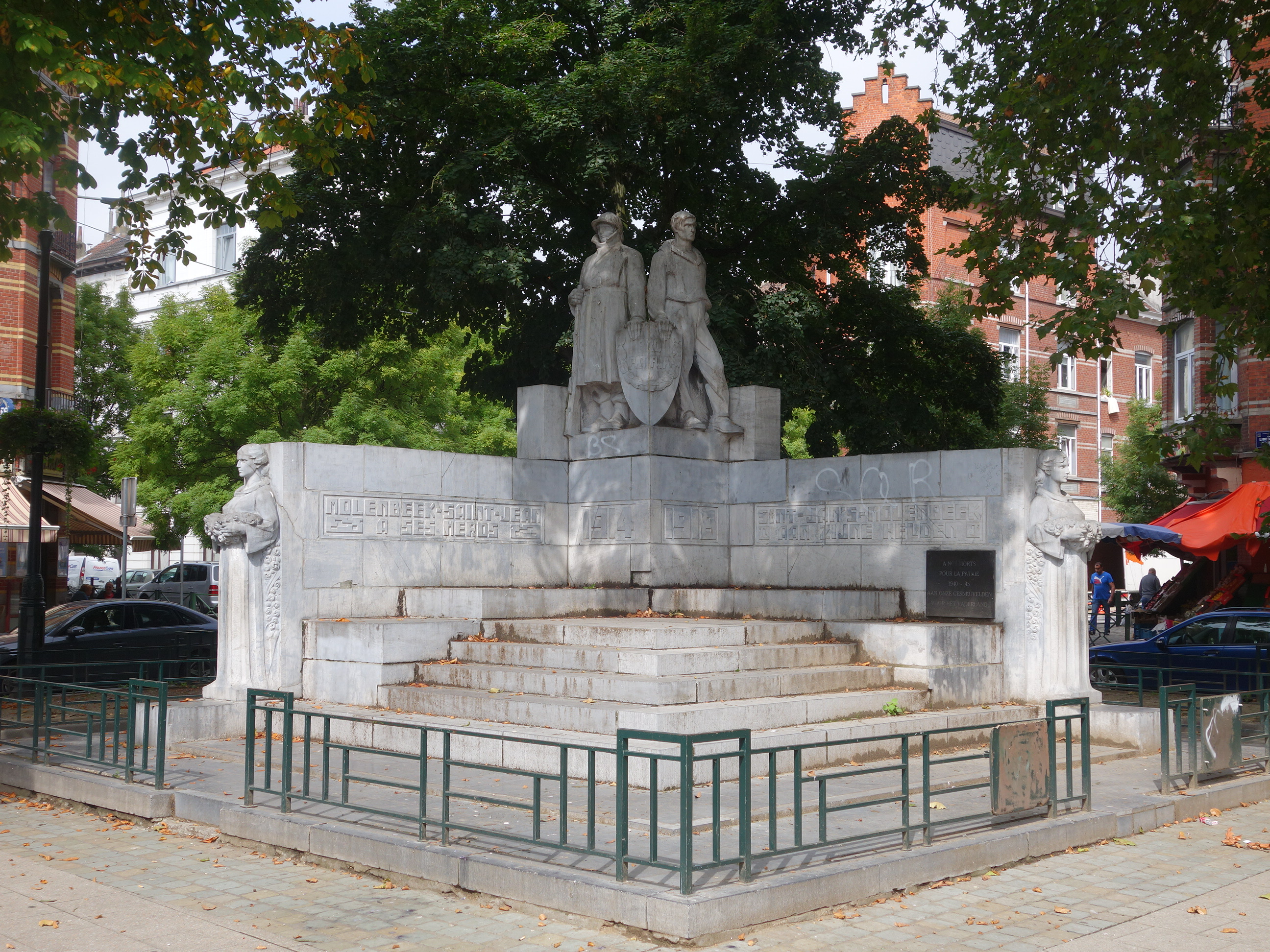
World War I memorial on the Square des Libérateurs/Bevrijderssquare

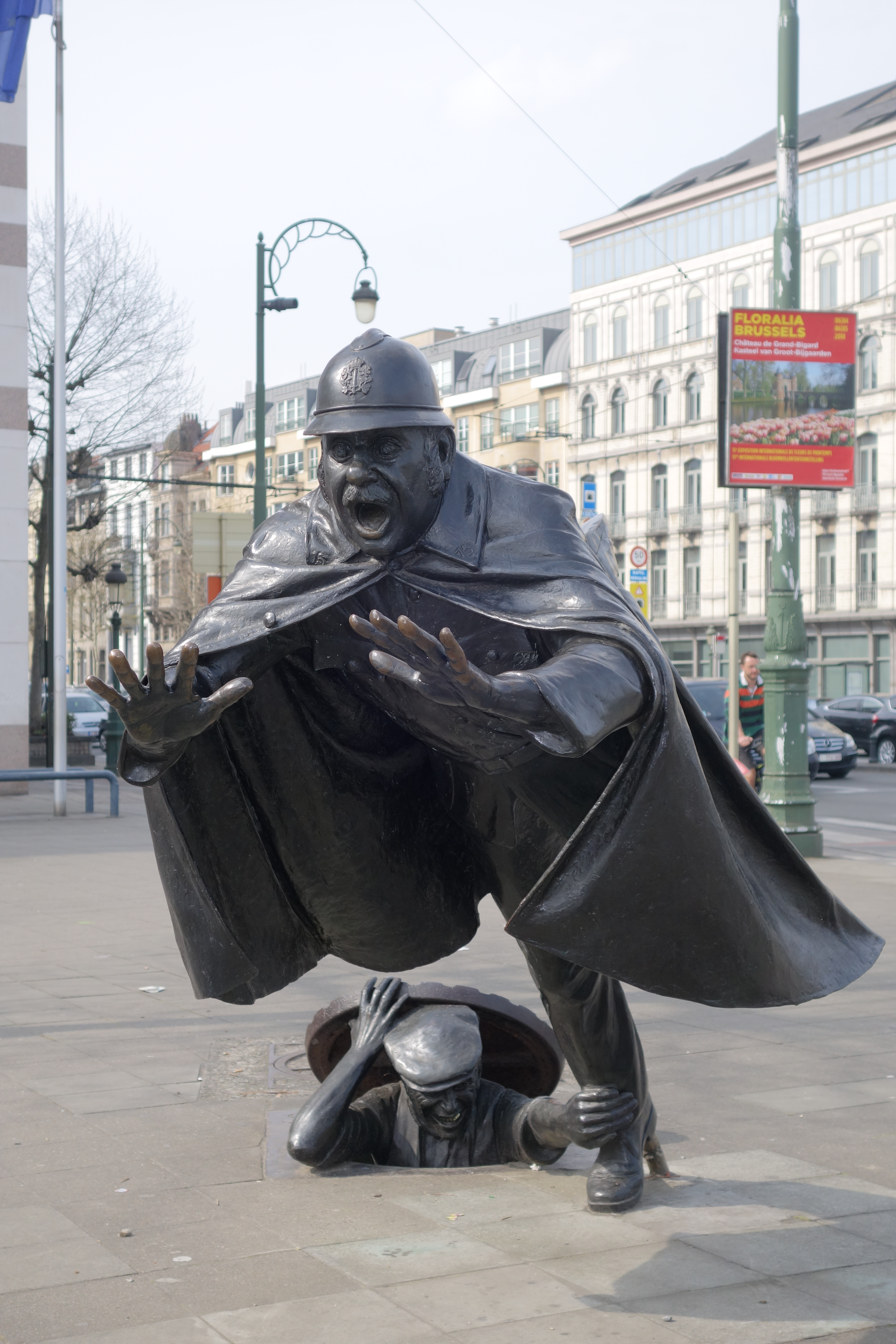
Vaartkapoen on the Place Sainctelette/Sainctelettesquare

== See also ==
- Neighbourhoods in Brussels
- History of Brussels
- Belgium in the long nineteenth century
