= N260 road (Belgium) =

Coordinates: 50°52′48″N 4°22′13″E

The N260 is a regional road in Belgium between Grimbergen/Vilvoorde (N211a) and Brussels (N277a) where the road changes into the N260a. The road has a length of about 9 kilometers.

The N260a continues from the N277a along the Brussels-Schelde Sea Canal to the R20a/b. This part of the road is about 1.9 kilometers. The N260b is a connection between the N260a and the N201 via the Redersbrug that crosses the Brussels-Scheldt Sea Canal. This road has a length of about 250 meters.
