= Human Rights Monument, Brussels =

Monument in Brussels, Belgium

Human Rights Monument
- Monument aux Droits de l'Homme (French); Monument voor de Mensenrechten (Dutch)
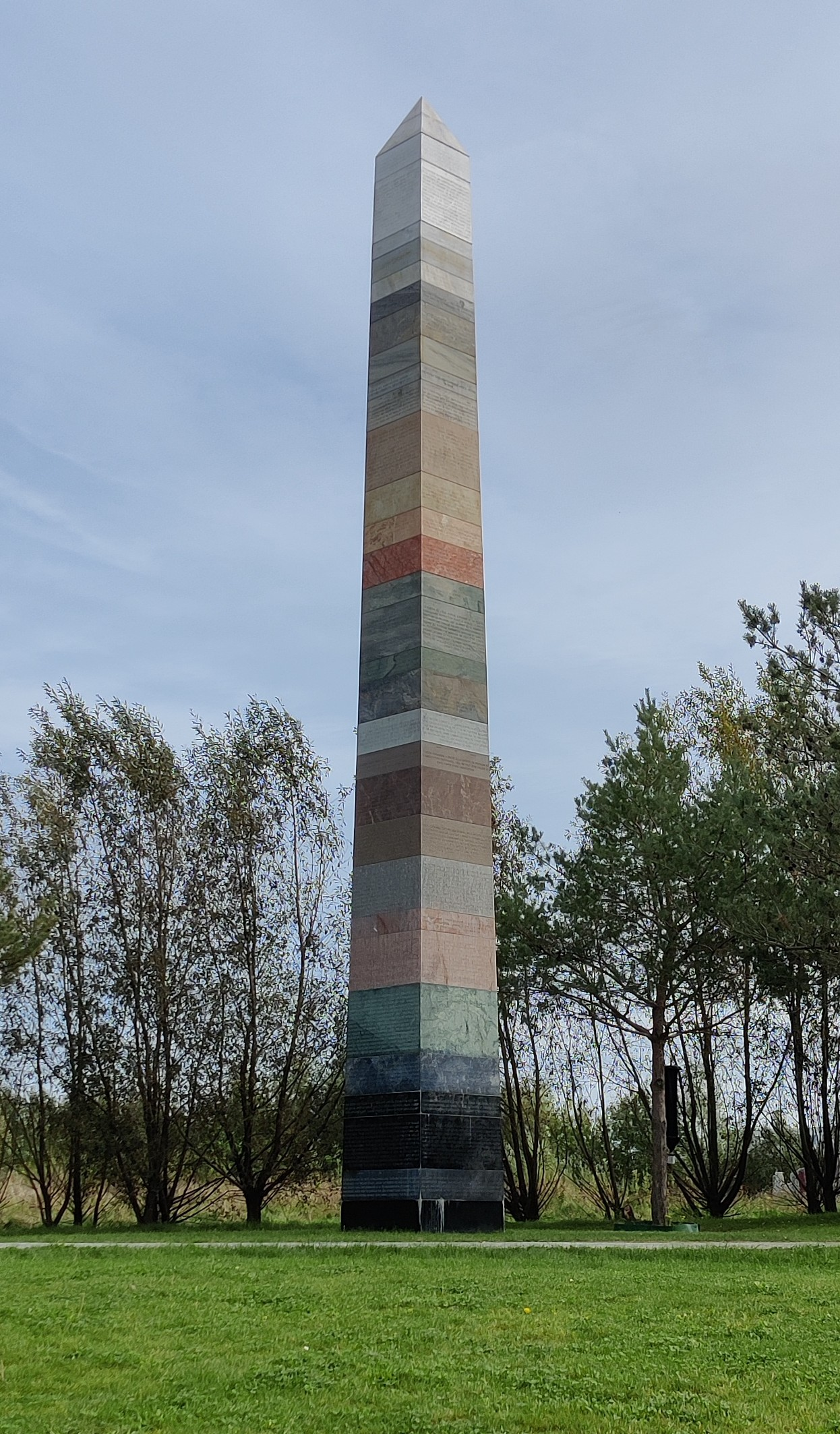
- Human Rights Monument in 2023
- Interactive map of Human Rights Monument
- Location: Tour & Taxis Park; 1000 City of Brussels, Brussels-Capital Region, Belgium
- Coordinates: 50°52′07.79″N 04°20′40.42″E
- Designer: Bas Smets
- Type: Obelisk
- Material: Stone
- Height: 12 m (39 ft)
- Inauguration date: 10 December 2018

The Human Rights Monument (French: Monument aux Droits de l'Homme; Dutch: Monument voor de Mensenrechten) is a monument in Tour & Taxis Park, in the City of Brussels, Belgium, commemorating the 70th anniversary of the signing of the Universal Declaration of Human Rights (UDHR). Designed by the landscape architect Bas Smets, it was inaugurated on 10 December 2018.

== Construction ==
The monument was created to provide a dedicated space for reflection on human rights, addressing the lack of such a space in Brussels. While human rights texts have been displayed in other public areas, such as Parvis de Saint-Gilles/Sint-Gillisvoorplein premetro station, this monument offers a space for deeper contemplation. The design was inspired by Memorial 22/03, a land-art work by Smets honouring victims of the 2016 Brussels bombings, and it aims to serve as a physical representation of human rights.

Commissioned by the former Brussels Minister of the Environment and Energy, Céline Fremault, and financed by Brussels Environment with a budget of €140,000, the monument was completed in time for Human Rights Day (HRD) in 2018.

== Description ==
The 12-metre-high (39 ft) obelisk features thirty coloured stone blocks, each inscribed with an article of the UDHR in French, Dutch, German, and English. The colours range from dark at the bottom to light at the top, symbolising the diversity of human rights and cultures. Surrounded by a circle of Scots pines, the monument invites reflection on the values of equality and dignity. The design was developed through consultations with human rights groups, political parties, and architects, emphasising the importance of collaboration and interdisciplinary dialogue. The monument encourages visitors to engage with the principles of human rights and consider their relevance today.

== See also ==
- Sculpture in Brussels
- Human rights in Belgium
- Tour & Taxis
