= Jubilee Bridge, Brussels =

Bridge in Brussels, Belgium

Jubilee Bridge: Pont du Jubilé (French); Jubelfeestbrug (Dutch)
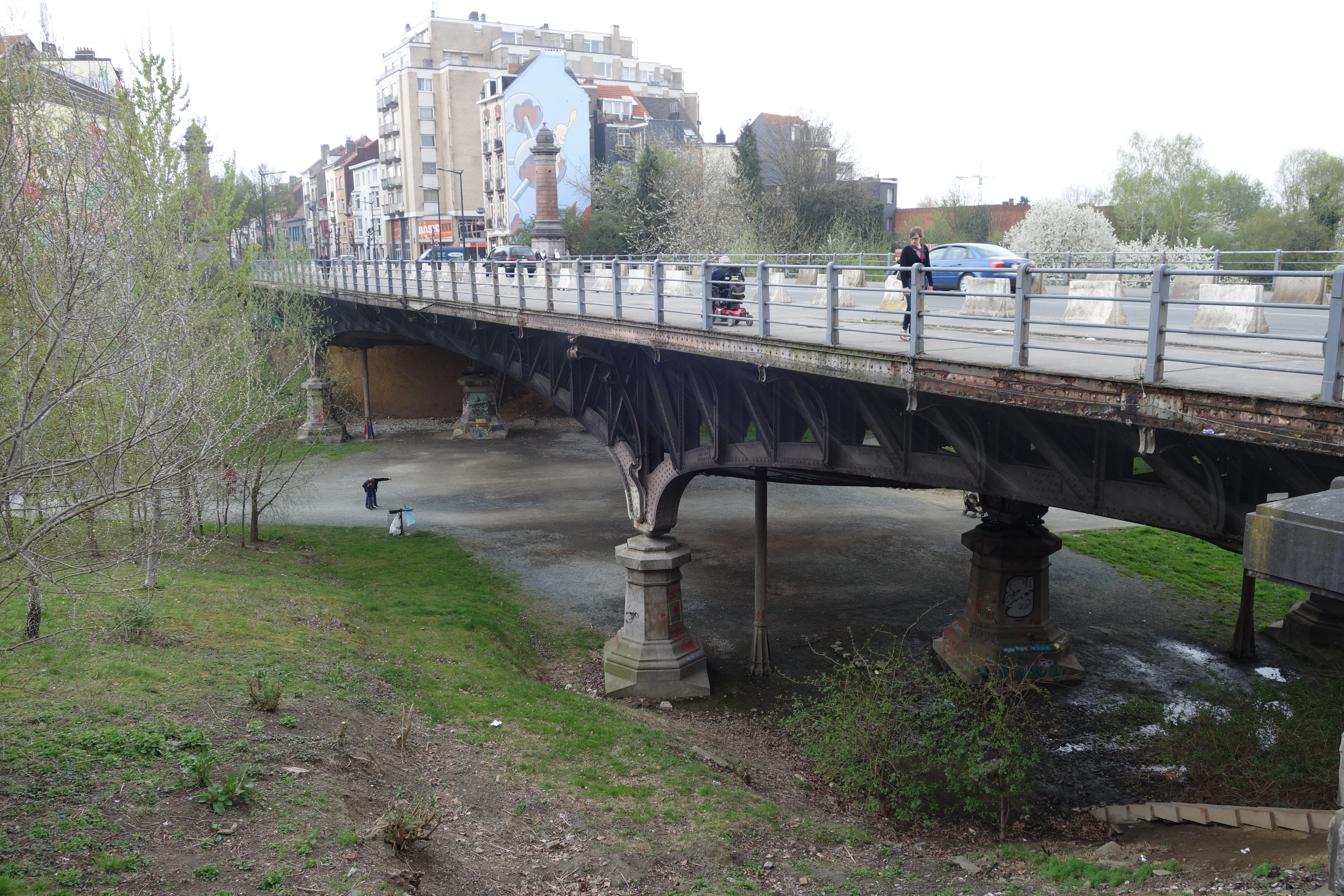
- Coordinates: 50°52′10.41″N 4°20′33.17″E
- Carries: Boulevard du Jubilé/Jubelfeestlaan
- Crosses: Tour & Taxis Park
- Locale: Brussels, Belgium
- Other names: Bockstael Bridge; Monumental Bridge
- Owner: Brussels-Capital Region
- Maintained by: Brussels Mobility
- Heritage status: Protected
- Followed by: Clesse Bridge

Characteristics
- Design: Cantilever bridge
- Material: Metal
- Total length: 80 m (260 ft)
- No. of spans: 3

History
- Designer: Frédéric Bruneel
- Construction start: 1903
- Construction end: 1904

Location
- Interactive map of Jubilee Bridge

The Jubilee Bridge (French: Pont du Jubilé; Dutch: Jubelfeestbrug) is a road-and-foot-traffic bridge crossing Tour & Taxis Park in Brussels, Belgium. Built in 1904 to designs by the engineer Frédéric Bruneel, it connects the Boulevard du Jubilé/Jubelfeestlaan in the Maritime Quarter of Molenbeek-Saint-Jean on the south side to the Boulevard Émile Bockstael/Emile Bockstaellaan in Laeken on the north side.

The approximately 80-metre-long (260 ft) metal bridge is an early example of a cantilever bridge in the city and features monumental stone supports and Art Nouveau-influenced detailing. During the 20th century, some of the bridge's decorative elements were removed. It was designated a protected monument in 2007 and underwent a major restoration before reopening to traffic in 2026.

== History ==
At the end of the 19th century, the widening of the Willebroek Canal and the construction of a new seaport led to the development of Tour & Taxis as a major economic hub. Warehouses and administrative buildings were constructed on the border of the City of Brussels and Molenbeek-Saint-Jean and connected to the railway network. The development of the site contributed to the urbanisation of the surrounding neighbourhoods and the construction of new thoroughfares, including the Boulevard du Jubilé/Jubelfeestlaan and the Boulevard Émile Bockstael/Émile Bockstaellaan.

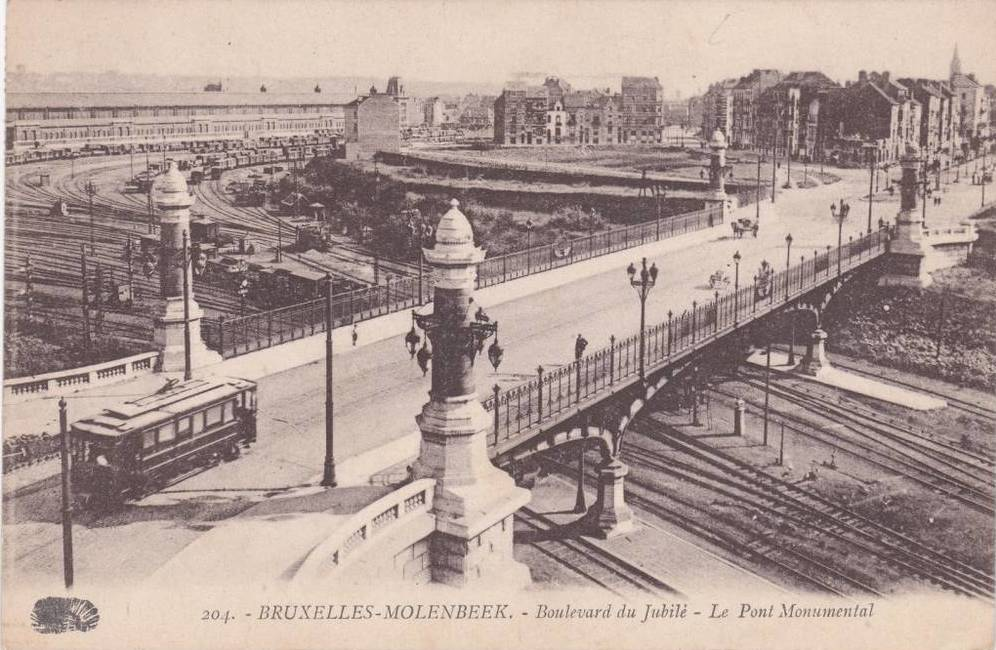
The Jubilee Bridge, c. 1904–1912

The bridge was built over railway line 28, connecting the port station with the western ring railway. It was designed in 1903 by the Belgian State Railways engineer Frédéric Bruneel and constructed in 1904 to connect the two avenues. During the 20th century, successive renovations caused the bridge to lose some of its decorative elements, including its Art Nouveau wrought-iron lanterns and original balustrade.

In 2001, the railway line was dismantled, and the land beneath the bridge was sold in 2008 and incorporated into Tour & Taxis Park. The bridge was designated a protected monument by the government of the Brussels-Capital Region in 2007. By the end of the 2010s, however, the bridge was in poor condition. A 2018 survey revealed severe corrosion and weakening of the metal components, meaning the bridge no longer met current safety standards. The bridge therefore had to be regularly inspected for stability, and parts of the passageway beneath it were closed off.

In 2020, the National Railway Company of Belgium (SNCB/NMBS), which owned the bridge, proposed transferring it to the City of Brussels or the municipality of Molenbeek for one symbolic euro. The restoration costs were estimated at that time to be several million euros. In 2021, SNCB/NMBS and the Brussels-Capital Region agreed on a complete restoration, initially estimated at €8 million. The restoration took almost two years and included repairs to the structure, replacement of the bridge deck, restoration of the wrought ironwork and stone columns, and reinstatement of the historic green colour and lighting. The bridge was also adapted with separate cycle paths and wider pedestrian areas.

The restored bridge reopened to traffic on 1 July 2026. The restoration cost €11.5 million, jointly funded by SNCB/NMBS and urban.brussels. Following the restoration, ownership of the bridge was transferred to the Brussels-Capital Region.

== Description ==
The Jubilee Bridge is an approximately 80-metre-long (260 ft) metal bridge with a span of 41 metres (135 ft). Its deck is supported by three cantilever trusses forming three unequal spans, resting on octagonal hardstone piers and monumental hardstone abutments. The combination of a metal bridge structure with stone supports reflects the use of relatively new construction techniques at the time. The abutments and other architectural elements are designed in an eclectic style, while the metal brackets supporting the pavements feature Art Nouveau detailing.

The bridge is framed at both ends by monumental columns with pink granite shafts, polygonal bases and capitals with Tuscan influences. Their upper sections are shaped to resemble papal tiaras. The original bridge featured wrought-iron lanterns, street lamps and balustrades decorated with elaborate plant motifs characteristic of Art Nouveau. Most of these decorative elements have since disappeared and the original balustrades were replaced. The 2026 restoration revived aspects of the bridge's historic appearance with contemporary elements while adapting it for pedestrian and cycling use.

== See also ==
- History of Brussels
- Belgium in the long nineteenth century
