= May 2025 Brussels clashes =

Football fan violence in Brussels

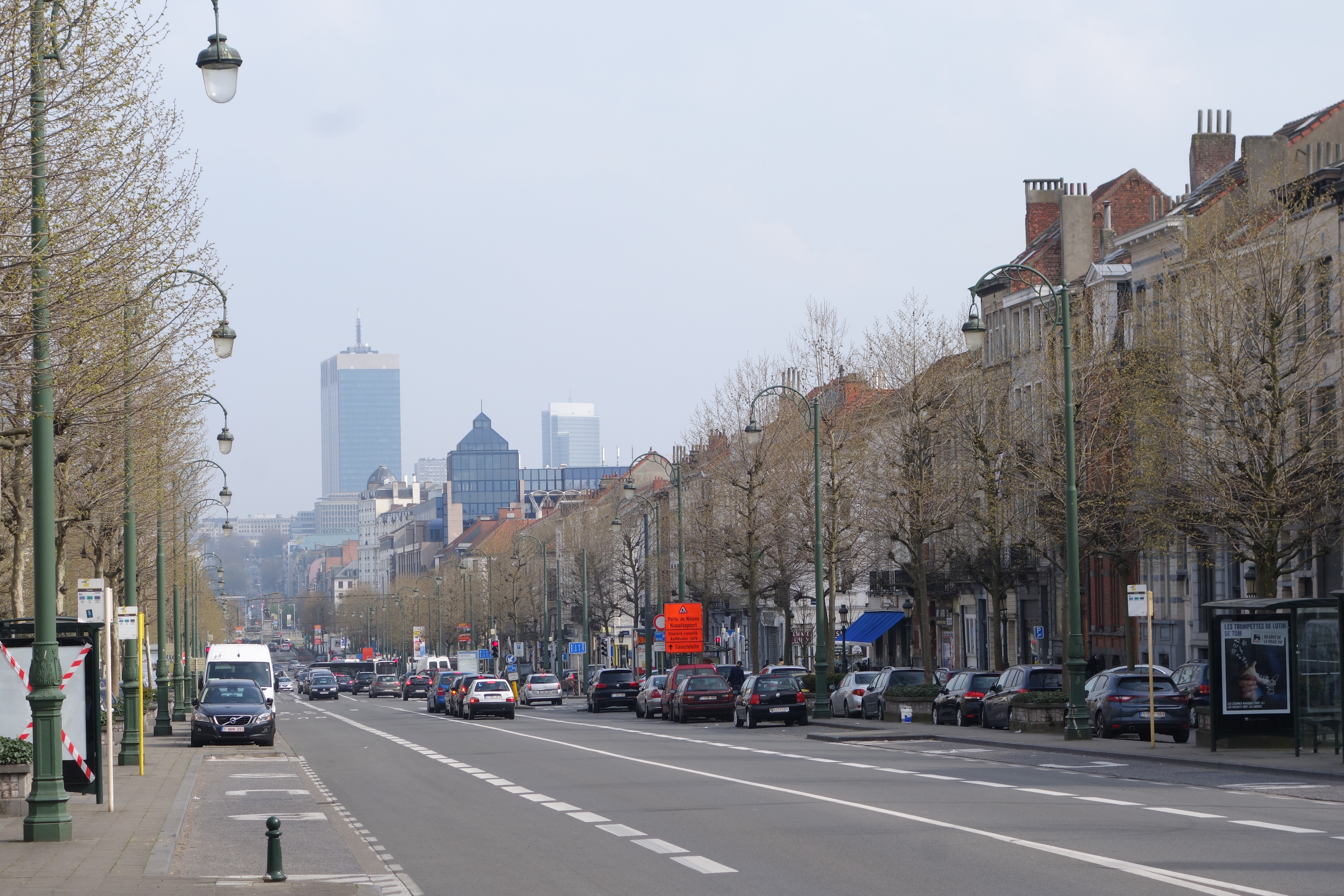
- The Maritime Quarter in Brussels, where some of the clashes occurred (Boulevard Léopold II pictured)
- Date: 4–5 May 2025
- Location: Brussels, Belgium
- Methods: Riots, ambush

Parties
Hooligans of Club Brugge KV	Brussels residents	Belgian Federal Police

Casualties
- Injuries: 9 hospitalized, 80 injured
- Arrested: 77 arrested (Note: 63 arrests took place on 4 May and 14 more on 5 May 2025.)

On 4 May 2025, around the occasion of the 2025 Belgian Cup final, a football match between Club Brugge KV and RSC Anderlecht played at the King Baudouin Stadium in Brussels, violent clashes broke out away from the match venue in several districts of the Belgian capital.

Before the match, Club Brugge hooligans gathered in large numbers and headed for the municipalities of Molenbeek-Saint-Jean and Jette. Incidents have been reported, including damage to businesses and physical assaults. Videos posted on social networks show hooded individuals attacking businesses and passers-by. Local authorities have described some of these acts as racially motivated anti-Arab violence. These attacks provoked strong indignation at national level and in the Belgian press.

During the match, calls for mobilization circulated on social networks, prompting Brussels residents to gather around the stadium and in metro stations to confront the Bruges fans. Dressed in black and for the most part wearing masks, youngsters from several Brussels neighborhoods formed groups that drove through the city center, in an escalation of violence that attacked any supporter remotely connected with the football match. Sporadic clashes broke out between Brussels youths and Club Brugge and Anderlecht supporters, necessitating the intervention of the police.

After the match, around Brussels-South railway station, around a hundred people gathered to prevent the departure of Club Brugge supporters by train. An altercation degenerated, and a Bruges supporter was shot in the ankle by a shot fired from the Brussels youth camp. The public prosecutor's office reported 63 arrests and 80 injured, including four police officers, nine of whom were taken to hospital.

The following day, 5 May 2025, demonstrations took place in downtown Brussels to denounce the violence of the previous day and the lack of police presence in Molenbeek during the attacks. The demonstrations degenerated into clashes with the police, resulting in further damage and arrests. A further 14 arrests were made that day.

== Context ==
=== Club Bruges background ===
According to sociologist Jean-Michel De Waele, the attacking hooligans belong to a structured group: the North Fanatics 13, ultras from Club Brugge KV known for their far-right stance. During the clashes on 4 May 2025, this group of ultras was also accompanied by members of Brugge Youth, another group linked to the North Fanatics.

The North Fanatics probably number around 200 members. According to the press, around twenty of them form a particularly active and influential group, known for their aggressive behavior, exerting a form of control over some of Bruges' youth. Members of core groups of hooligans from Lille and FC Meppen, a team from the lower regions of Germany, were also present with the North Fanatics in Brussels.

=== Situation in Belgium ===
In Belgium, a portion of Club Brugge hooligans are known to use anti-Semitic, racist and homophobic language in their songs.

== Clashes ==
On 4 May 2025, a large group of Club Brugge KV fans arrived at Brussels-Central railway station from Bruges at around midday. According to witnesses, a small number of supporters used the station's toilets to take drugs. Police reported a first incident at around 1.15 p.m., marking a first confrontation with RSC Anderlecht supporters.

As the fans made their way to the King Baudouin Stadium by metro, some hooligans banged on the windows and doors of the metro, until one door came loose. The metro was then forced to stop, and the fans got off at Sainte-Catherine station. They set off on foot to the Maritime Quarter or Ribaucourt district of Molenbeek-Saint-Jean, a neighborhood with a large Moroccan population, chanting racist and xenophobic songs. They carried out verbal and physical attacks targeting people perceived as Maghrebi, be they men, women or children. According to sociologist Jean-Michel De Waele, these hooligans went to Molenbeek with the explicit intention of "smashing Arabs".

At around 3 p.m., as they passed through the neighborhood, the group made their way through the streets of Molenbeek, stopping at the Brol Coffee House to carry out their first attack: customers were targeted and chairs were used as projectiles. They then continued on their way, stopping at a DIY store: they attacked a 73-year-old Moroccan tiler and his 22-year-old son, also ransacking their store. According to the victims and several witnesses, the assailants shouted "Where are the Muslims?", "Go home", while uttering death threats. Both men were hospitalized in critical condition.

Shortly before and during the match, calls for violence circulated on social networks, calling on Brussels youth to gather in the vicinity of the King Baudouin Stadium in order to carry out reprisal actions. Stabbings were reported in several Brussels neighborhoods, including Molenbeek, Laeken, Saint-Gilles and a number of metro stations, including Clemenceau. On the one hand, young people from Brussels presented as "immigrants" by the French-language press and of Moroccan origin according to the Flemish press; on the other, hooligans, mostly from the North Fanatics group.

After the match, major damage to the stadium was reported, to the tune of €70,000. As the Bruges fans left the stadium, direct clashes broke out on the Avenue Houba-de Strooper between Bruges fans and Brussels youth. According to a Bruges witness, Brussels cab drivers were also involved in the confrontation. The violence culminated in a mass of Brussels youths at Brussels-South railway station to prevent their departure by train, and also led to a gunshot being fired at the entrance, during which a Club Brugge supporter was shot in the ankle. All over Brussels, any fan connected with the Club Brugge-Anderlecht match was attacked by masked and vehicular groups, resulting in a large number of collateral victims, including children and women.

Following the clashes, there was also outrage that Brugge fans, with no connection to hooliganism, had been deliberately attacked by young Brussels residents in retaliation for the racist attacks in Molenbeek. Several Brugge fans were left for dead: they were hit on the head while lying inanimate on the ground, with the assailants taking photos and posting them on social networks. Collateral victims also included RSC Anderlecht fans. In the Halle Gate district of Saint-Gilles, young Brusseler assailants dragged a fan in critical condition by his feet to the center of the square to take a photo, which was then shared on social networks. The photo shows the attackers' faces hidden by emojis, while one of them clearly gives the victim 'the finger'.

One day later, a social media account of Club Brugge hooligans revealed that they were going to the Place de la Bourse, where a pro-Palestinian demonstration was taking place. This call was quickly echoed by the people of Brussels, prompting an appeal to Brussels youth via social networks to go there and confront the Bruges hooligans. In the end, the presence of the Brussels youth quickly turned into a confrontation with the police, provoking a riot in parts of the city center, including the Boulevard Maurice Lemonnier, the Boulevard du Midi and the Anderlecht Gate.

== Victims ==
On 4 May 2025, the public prosecutor's office reported 80 injured, including four police officers, nine of whom were taken to hospital. One of these was a 38-year-old Club Brugge KV fan from Mol, who was shot in the ankle by a gun at Brussels-South railway station. Another Brugge supporter was stabbed to death as the metro stopped at Clemenceau station. The majority of Bruges fans attacked were in Molenbeek-Saint-Jean, on the Avenue Houba-de Strooper, in Laeken, and at Brussels-North railway station. In addition to the Bruges victims, at least 40 Anderlecht supporters were also attacked by Brussels youths in groups and vehicles, although they had nothing to do with the racist attack in Molenbeek-Saint-Jean by Bruges hooligans.

== Authors ==
On 4 May 2025, the public prosecutor's office announced a total of 63 arrests in connection with the violence surrounding the Belgian Cup final.

On 5 May, two Brusseler suspects were arrested for their alleged involvement in racially motivated acts of violence committed by Club Bruges KV hooligans. On the same day, police also arrested twelve other individuals in downtown Brussels, in connection with the riots that had broken out on the Place de la Bourse.

On 7 May, the Brussels-Capital/Ixelles police zone called on anyone with footage of hooligan violence in downtown Brussels and the Laeken district to pass it on. A judicial task force has been set up to analyze these images and identify the perpetrators of the attacks and damage committed on the sidelines of the Belgian Cup.

== Hommage ==
On 6 May 2025, around one hundred people gathered at the site of the racist attacks in Molenbeek-Saint-Jean to lay flowers in tribute to the victims. The commemoration, organized by local residents, was also attended by political figures such as Jamal Ikazban, Ahmed El Khannouss and mayor Amet Gjanaj.

== Reactions ==
Club Brugge KV strongly condemned the violence involving some of its supporters. In a statement, the club said: "Club Brugge will cooperate with the police to identify those involved. Football must never be a cover for violence".

The mayor of Brussels, Philippe Close, also reacted, saying: "I condemn in the strongest possible terms the racist violence committed by certain Bruges supporters. These are unacceptable and intolerable acts.I would like to thank the police for their swift intervention".

Interior Minister Bernard Quintin said: "We strongly condemn these unacceptable acts. Those responsible for the violence in Brussels must be severely punished". In addition, he announced the revision of the Football Law after a meeting with Lorin Parys, CEO of the Pro League, the Belgian professional football body.

Amet Gjanaj, member of the Socialist Party and acting mayor of Molenbeek-Saint-Jean (in Catherine Moureaux's absence), publicly declared: "There was no upstream filter to prevent these people from coming to Brussels. What happened on Sunday is unacceptable".

The mayor of Anderlecht, Fabrice Cumps, took action by banning Club Brugge supporters from their next match in Brussels. This decision was condemned by Club Brugge in an official press release. In response, the mayor officially declared: "They are not responsible for maintaining order on the territory of the municipality, but I am". The Flemish Minister for Brussels, Cieltje Van Achter of the New Flemish Alliance, said she considers that the police did not give a negative opinion on the holding of the match and asserts that security could be guaranteed. She said she believes that punishing fans for the behavior of a few hooligans is unfair.

== Aftermath ==
On 21 May 2025, the Interior Commission of the Belgian Chamber of Representatives decided that it will hold a series of hearings into the events.

On 23 May, Brussels public prosecutor Julien Moinil declared that there will be prosecutions against the perpetrators of the violence.

== See also ==
- List of hooligan firms
- List of riots
- Moroccans in Belgium
- R.S.C. Anderlecht–Club Brugge KV rivalry
