= De Brug van Willebroek =

1990 song by Wannes Van de Velde

De Brug van Willebroek (The Bridge of Willebroek) is a 1990 song by Wannes Van de Velde about the bridge near the Brussels–Scheldt Maritime Canal in the Flemish village Willebroek. The song has also been covered by the Antwerp band Katastroof.

== Lyrics ==
The lyrics describe a man who has two appointments, one at the royal palace, another with Jane Fonda and yet another with the Flemish government who offer him a position in the Ministry of Culture. Yet he fails to get at each of these appointments, because he has to cross the canal and the bridge happens to be closed every time he reaches it. It frustrates him so much that he calls it a "monster van ijzer en staal" ("a monster of iron and steel"). The final lyrics have him reflect that if God ever tells him it's time to die he'll try to go the bridge of Willebroek, so he'll have an excuse why he was late.

== In popular culture ==
The song is used as a waiting tune for the telephone lines of the city council of Willebroek. In 2011 there was talk of raising a statue of Van de Velde near the bridge of Willebroek, but his family vetoed the idea.
