= Tour & Taxis =

Former industrial site, now mixed-use neighbourhood in Brussels, Belgium

Tour & Taxis: Tour et Taxis (French); Thurn en Taxis (Dutch)
- Neighbourhood
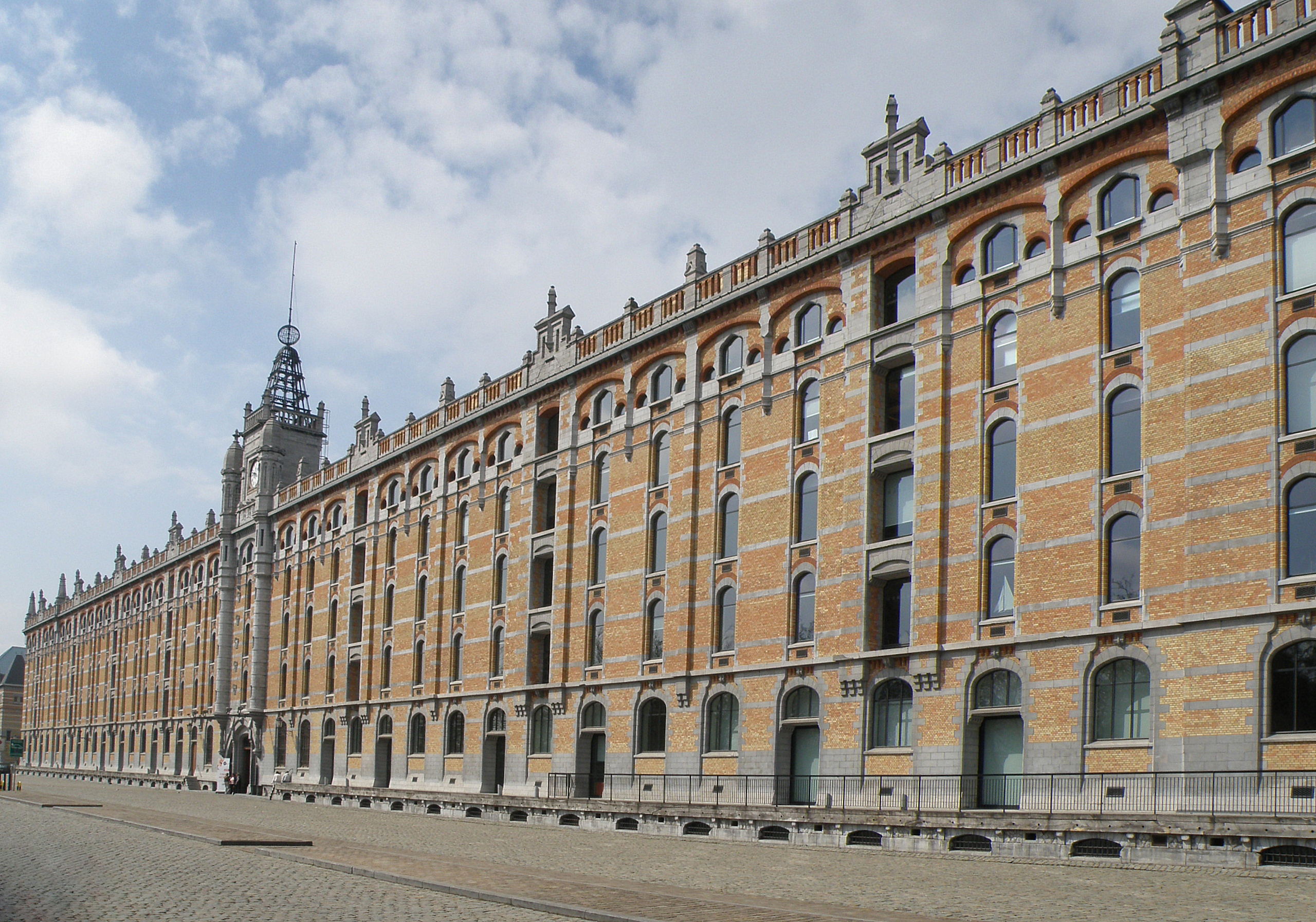
- The Royal Depot of Tour & Taxis seen from the Avenue du Port/Havenlaan's side
- Nickname: T&T
- Location within Brussels Tour & Taxis (Belgium)
- Coordinates: 50°51′51″N 04°20′55″E
- Country: Belgium
- Region: Brussels-Capital Region
- Arrondissement: Brussels-Capital
- Municipality: City of Brussels
- Construction start: 22 July 1900
- Opening: 12 November 1922
- Redevelopment: 2001–present
- Named for: Princely House of Thurn and Taxis
- Time zone: UTC+1 (CET)
  - Summer (DST): UTC+2 (CEST)
- Postal code: 1000, 1020
- Area codes: 02
- Website: tour-taxis.com

Tour & Taxis (French: Tour et Taxis, pronounced [tuʁ e taksi]; Dutch: Thurn en Taxis, pronounced [ˈtʏr(ə)n ɛn ˈtɑksɪs]) is a large former industrial site in Brussels, Belgium. It is situated on the embankment of the Brussels Canal in the City of Brussels, just north-west of the city centre. The location is immediately adjacent to Laeken and Molenbeek-Saint-Jean, and about 1 kilometre (0.62 miles) west from the city's Northern Quarter business district.

The site is composed of large warehouses and commercial buildings at a former freight train station called the Maritime Station (French: Gare Maritime; Dutch: Maritiem Station), and its spacious central hall known as the Royal Depot (French: Entrepôt Royal; Dutch: Koninklijk Pakhuis). The main buildings on the site are made of brick, glass and wrought iron, and are prime examples of 19th-century industrial architecture.

Though the site was long disused following its loss of importance as a transshipment and customs hub, it has been partially regenerated, and is now used for shops, offices, eateries, as well as for large cultural events, which have included Couleur Café Festival, the Brussels Design Market, BRAFA Art Fair, Art Brussels, The Color Run Belgium and the Salon du Chocolat.

== History ==
=== Origins and medieval times ===
The area developed in a former meander of the river Senne, where alluvial deposits gradually slowed the flow and created a marshy, wooded landscape. Human presence is attested from the Mesolithic period. In Roman times, it was home to permanent occupation, as attested by archaeological evidence discovered on site. In the late 1st century CE, the inhabitants of a local villa re-excavated the silted channel and reinforced its banks with wooden structures over approximately 80 metres (260 ft). This settlement continued to be used for agriculture and pastoralism in the 2nd and 3rd centuries, before being abandoned after the mid-3rd century. The channel then became cut off, reverting to marshland and woodland.

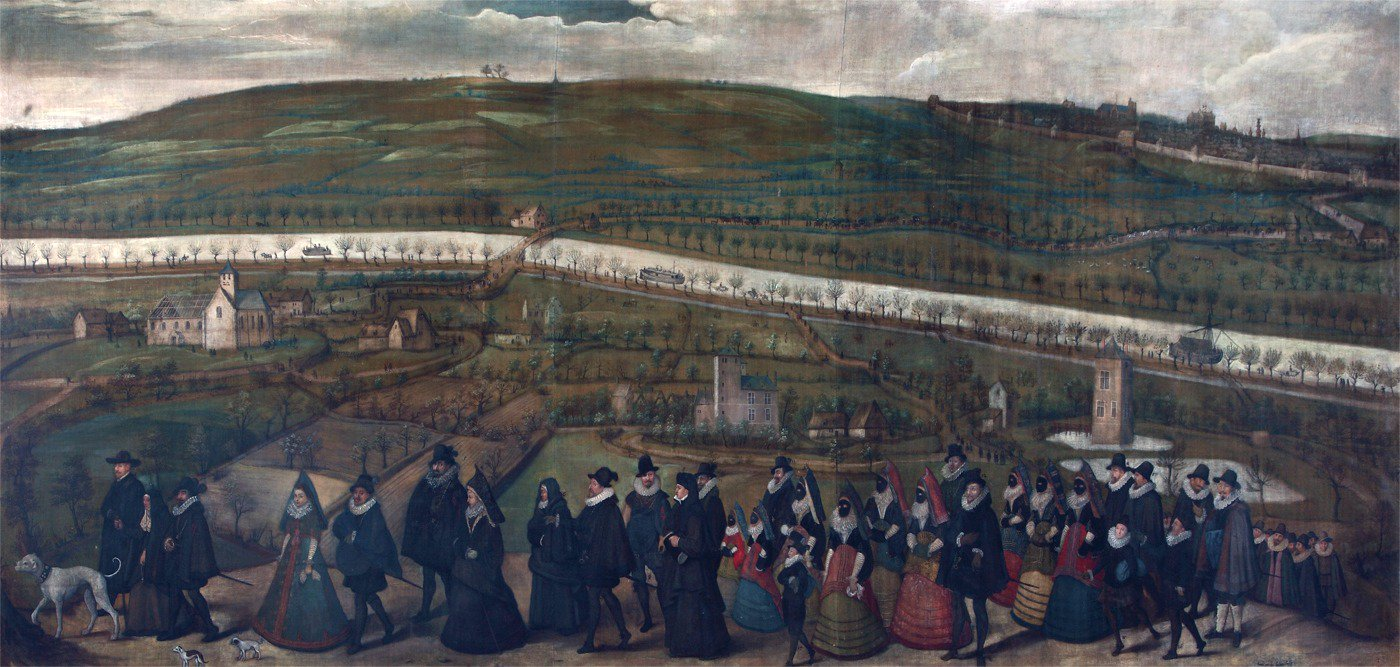
The Pilgrimage of the Archdukes Albert and Isabella to Laeken in 1601 by Hans van der Beken

In the early 14th century, the Hof te Drootbeke, a castle whose lands extended to the Senne, was established on the site. In 1561, the Willebroek Canal was opened for shipping, connecting Brussels to the river Scheldt and ultimately the North Sea. This transformed the area into an important transport corridor. At the end of the 16th century, another country estate, the Pantenhuis, was built nearby. By then, the channel mentioned above had disappeared from maps. In 1601, the area appeared in a bucolic landscape attributed to the Flemish painter Hans van der Beken, depicting a detailed view of Brussels. (Note: The painting shows the city's fortifications, the Church of St. Michael and St. Gudula (now the cathedral), and the Palace of Coudenberg in the distance. In the foreground, richly dressed figures, likely Archdukes Albert VII and Isabella with their entourage, are shown during their pilgrimage to the Church of Our Lady of Laeken. The bridge over the Willebroek Canal and the Lesser Senne (a tangent canal of the river) is visible in front of the church, together with the few buildings then standing on the marshy meadows.)

=== Thurn and Taxis family ===
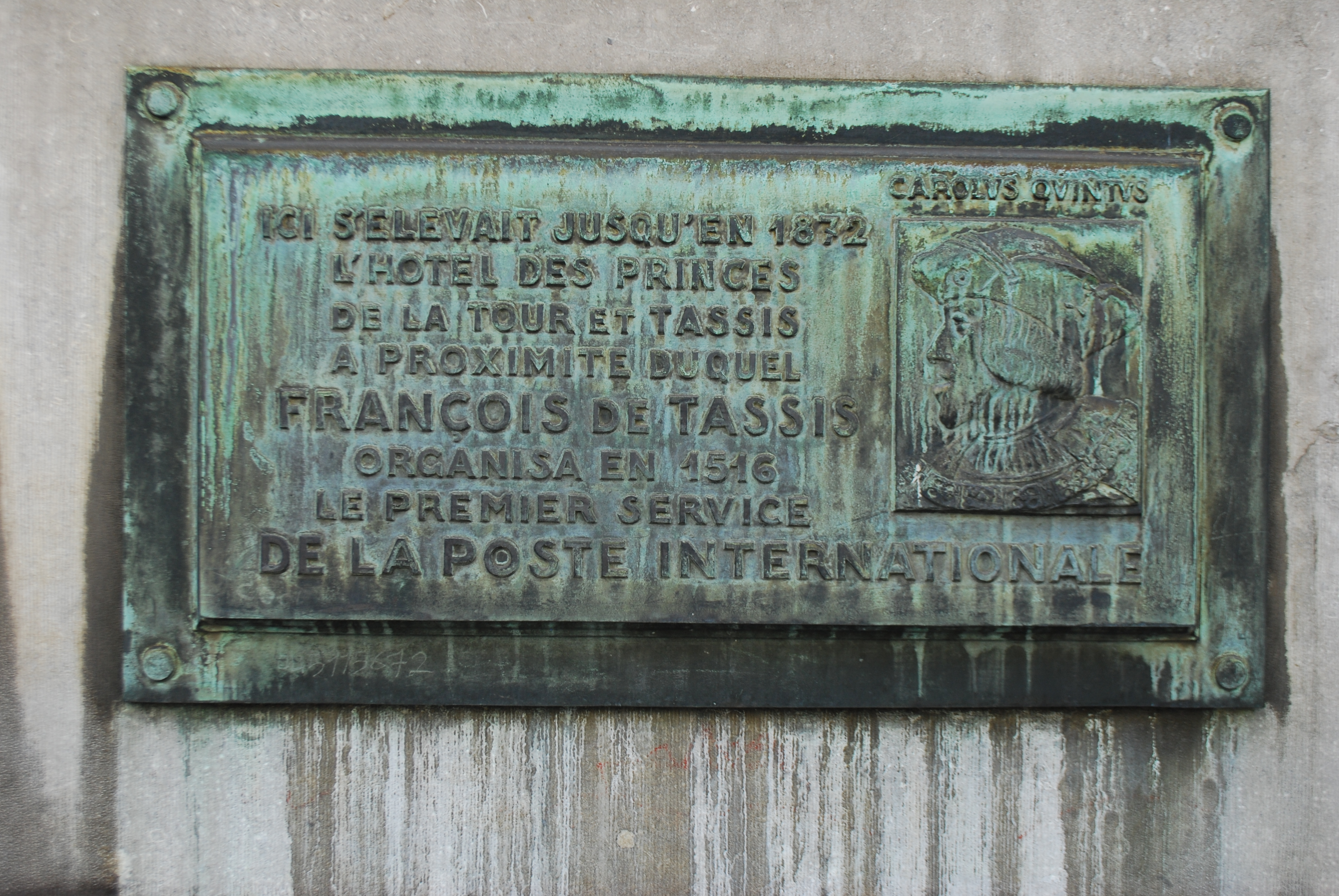
Plaque commemorating the Thurn and Taxis postal service in the Sablon/Zavel area of Brussels

At the beginning of the 18th century, the site came into the possession of the Princely House of Thurn and Taxis (also spelled Tassis), a German noble family famed for its multinational post and package business activities. Philip the Fair of Burgundy had promoted Franz von Taxis to postmaster in 1504, a position Taxis had also held for Maximilian I, Holy Roman Emperor, beginning in 1489. Francisco had moved the family to Brussels by 1516, from where they had organised the first horse-based international postal service. This imperial postal service, which linked the wealthy Low Countries to the Spanish court, and served the Holy Roman Empire and the rest of Europe, would be based in the city for nearly two centuries before moving to Frankfurt in 1704. During that period, the open fields in the middle of the industrial property were used as a pasture for the family's horses employed in the postal service between Brussels and Vienna.

Around 1764, the Pantenhuis was rebuilt by the brewer De Hondt and subsequently became known as the Brewer's Castle. A private road that crossed through the area connected the estate to the Willebroek Canal via a bridge over the Lesser Senne. The family gave its name to this small road, which was rendered into French as Tour et Taxis, and would in turn give its name to the area after its transition into a busy port.

=== Industrialisation and construction ===
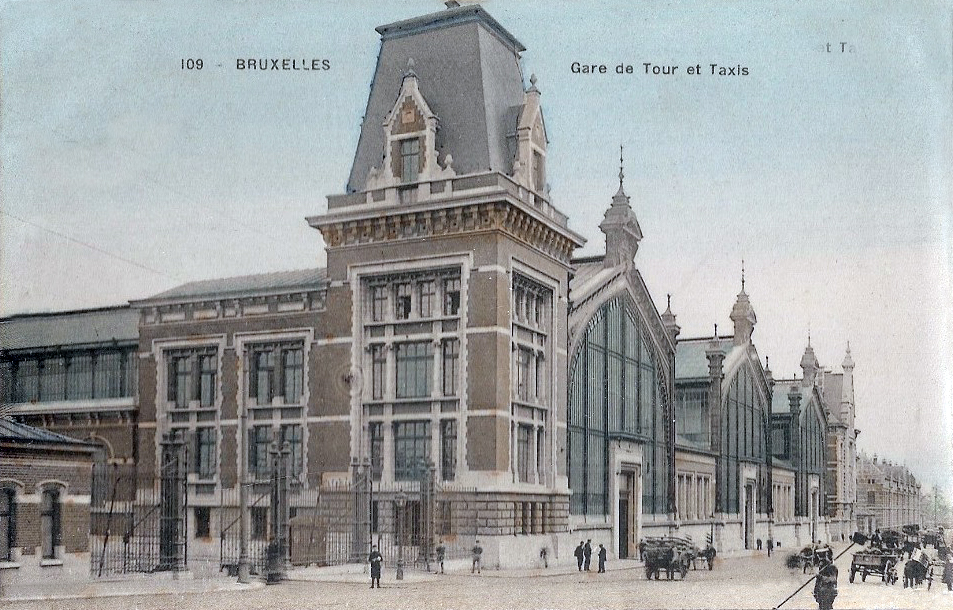
The Maritime Station, Tour & Taxis, c. 1910

Along with much of the rest of Europe, Belgium experienced intense economic and industrial growth during the "long nineteenth century". The Willebroek Canal, which had originally been constructed in the 1550s and 1560s, took on increased importance in the country's global trade over the course of the 1800s, and was modernised between 1829 and 1836. Its course was also amended to connect to the Brussels–Charleroi Canal, which opened in 1832, thus creating a direct link between the Port of Antwerp and the industrial area of Charleroi (Wallonia).

In 1852, a project proposed transforming the marshy meadows into a vast public park with gardens "where one could breathe freely", intended to compensate for "the nuisances caused by commerce and industry in the city". The plan, however, was never realised, as commercial and industrial development took precedence over concerns for public health. In 1872, the Thurn and Taxis family sold the land to the Société immobilière de l'Allemagne du Sud, which shortly afterwards resold it to the Belgian state, at the time when plans for a new goods station were taking shape. The Hof te Drootbeke was destroyed by fire in 1886, although its tower survived, while the Brewer's Castle was demolished at the end of the 19th century. In 1895, the Tour & Taxis site was selected by the Belgian state and the City of Brussels as the location for a new commercial station along the Brussels Canal. Construction of the Tour & Taxis industrial complex, spread over 37 ha (91 acres) of land, officially began on 22 July 1900, with King Leopold II present for the inaugural festivities.

Tour & Taxis was one of the world's first multi-modal freight transport platforms. Frédéric Bruneel served as the main engineer for the project, while Ernest Van Humbeeck, Constant Bosmans and Henri Vandeveld worked as architects. Central to the site's functionality was the Maritime Station (French: Gare Maritime, Dutch: Maritiem Station), a freight station constructed by Bruneel beginning in 1902 and open from 1907. This expansive, 40,000 m^{2} (430,000 sq ft) steel and glass structure was designed to efficiently receive goods by land, water, and rail. Major sources of cargo included sugar, coffee, alcohol, tobacco, and chocolate. Customs and excise duties were then collected on-site via the Customs House (French: Hôtel des Douanes, Dutch: Douanegebouw), and goods were stored in bonded warehouses—the Public Depot (French: Entrepôt Public, Dutch: Publieke Opslagplaats) and the Royal Depot (French: Entrepôt Royal, Dutch: Koninklijk Pakhuis)—before their redistribution. The Maritime Station was controlled by the Belgian State Railways (and, from 1926, the National Railway Company of Belgium), while the bonded warehouses were managed by the Société anonyme du Canal et des Installations maritimes de Bruxelles (and later, the Port of Brussels).

The buildings have been recognised for the quality of their construction. According to La Fonderie, Brussels Museum of Industry and Labour, the Tour & Taxis site is a "catalogue of architecture and civil engineering", as well as "a testament to the skills of Belgian engineers and workers, and their mastery of steel, iron, stone, glass and concrete." Their appearance was influenced by both the Flemish Renaissance and the Art Nouveau styles characteristic of early 20th-century Brussels.

=== Growth and decline ===
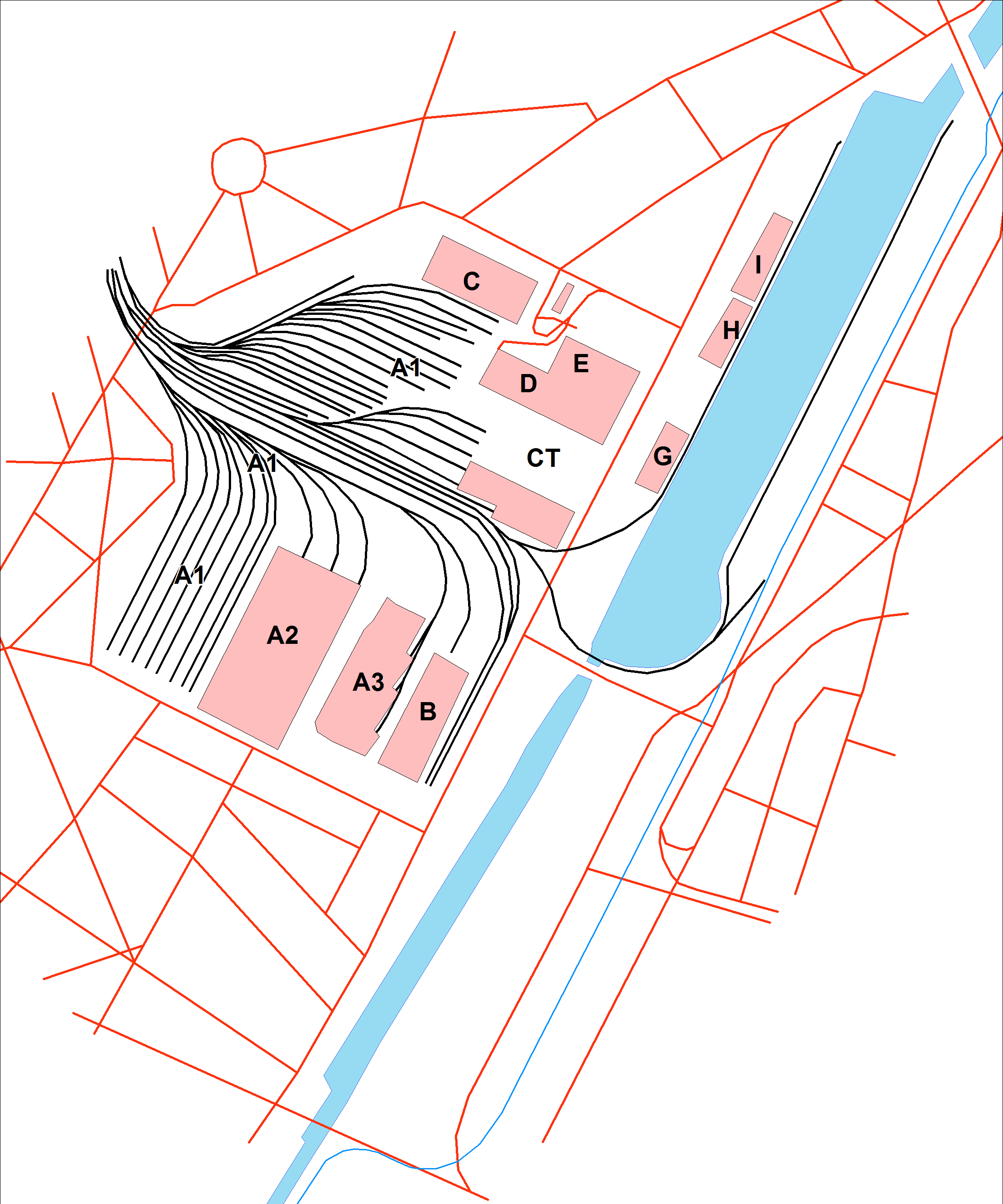
Sketch of the Tour & Taxis site during operation as a freight station and storage depot (Note: A1: railway tracks; A2: Maritime Station (freight station); A3: special warehouse; B: Royal Depot; C: TIR station; D and E: hangars; G, H and I: pilots at the Quai des Steamers/Steamerskaai (Bassin Vergote/Vergotedok))

During the first half of the 20th century, the busy Tour & Taxis site furthered industrial and economic development in Brussels. According to La Fonderie, "construction of the complex and the port resulted in the development of the surrounding area, where life soon revolved around the packaging, storage, sale and transportation of different cargoes... Outstanding industrial buildings sprang up, followed by residential buildings and workers' housing estates. The Tour & Taxis complex was a hive of social and economic activity. In its heyday at the end of the 1960s, it employed a workforce of almost 3,000."

As Europe's economic landscape shifted over the latter half of the 20th century, so did Tour & Taxis' importance as a centre of commerce and industry. The Treaty of Rome in 1957, of which Belgium was a signing member, created the European Economic Community (EEC) and initiated Europe's transition from economic borders towards a single market via reduced customs duties and the establishment of a customs union. At the same time, the expansion of Belgium's roads and motorways in the 1960s and 1970s (see Transport in Belgium) facilitated the increased transport of goods by road versus waterways or railways. The free movement of capital and goods within the EEC (and, from 1993, the European Union), combined with the changing means by which those goods were distributed within member states, gradually made the original function of the buildings at Tour & Taxis irrelevant. The Public Depot and the Royal Depot were rented out to private companies for storage space, but building maintenance became too expensive for the railway and port companies to maintain. By the 1990s, the Port of Brussels and the National Railway Company of Belgium (NMBS/SNCB) each put their shares of the Tour & Taxis property up for sale.

== Redevelopment ==
For several years, it remained unclear what Tour & Taxis would become in its next iteration. Plans to develop a 12,000-person concert hall on the premises were met with opposition by organisations like La Fonderie, The International Committee for the Conservation of the Industrial Heritage, the International Council on Monuments and Sites, World Monuments Watch, and Europa Nostra.

Project T&T, a joint venture among three real estate development companies—Extensa (Ackermans & van Haaren), RB Management, and IRET development—purchased the site in 2001. Extensa bought out the other partners in 2014. Each of the historical buildings has been renovated or is in the process of being renovated as part of a mixed-use development with office space, residences, a public park, public services, shopping and restaurants, while preserving the site's architectural heritage.

=== Heritage buildings ===
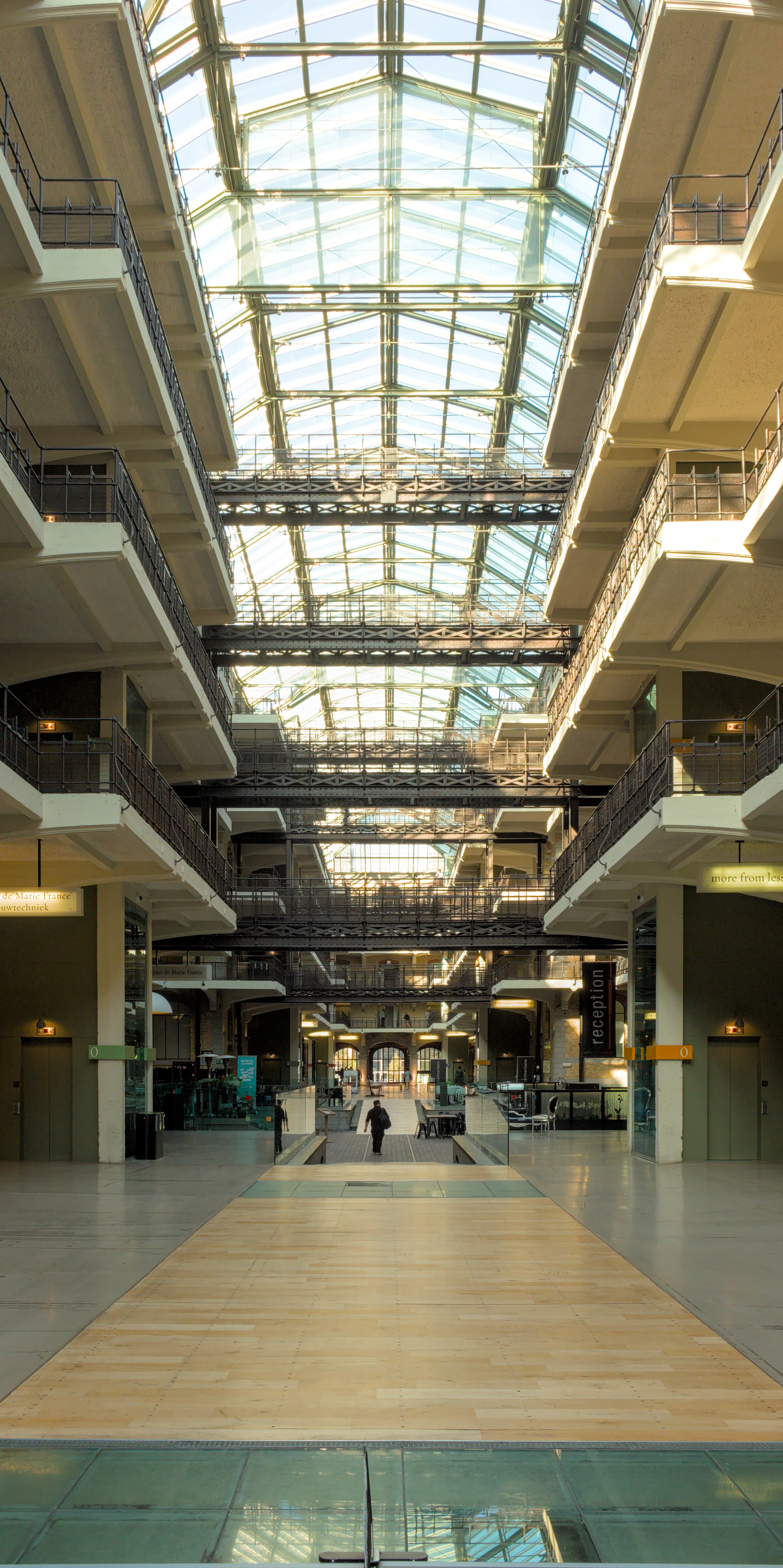
Interior of the Royal Depot following renovation

The Royal Depot was the first to be redeveloped. The original train track running through the bonded warehouse was replaced with an inner walkway lined by shops, restaurants such as Le Pain Quotidien, bars, a spa, and a childcare centre. The former storerooms on the upper floors were converted to office space and are occupied by law firms, creative and communications agencies, insurance companies, the public sector, and the like.

The former Public Depot (renamed the "Sheds"), once used to store incoming goods, was redeveloped next and is now one of the largest events venues in Brussels. The Sheds now host large events such as BRAFA Art Fair, the Foire du Livre book fair, the International Brussels Tattoo Convention, the Affordable Art Fair, JapanCon Brussels and BXLBeerFest, among others.

The former Hôtel de la Poste administrative building is now used for meetings and events such as the International Interior Design Exhibition Brussels. The former Hôtel des Douanes customs building is utilised as temporary office space, and is currently occupied by the Belgian branch of the French public relations firm Publicis Groupe.

Extensa redeveloped the Maritime Station and reopened the 40,000 m^{2} (430,000 sq ft) freight station in 2020 as a year-round "covered neighbourhood" with workspaces, a food hall, gardens, and events space. The renovated station uses geothermal energy along with repurposed paving stones and wood from the original building. It also incorporates electrochromic technology for its intelligent glass window glazing, which uses electric pulses to adjust the opacity of each window, with the option of creating either a dimmed or one-way mirror effect. Standalone workspaces made from wooden modules now accommodate 2,000 people within the station.

In 2008, Tour & Taxis was named a winner of the European Heritage Europa Nostra Awards in recognition of the conservation and redevelopment of its heritage buildings.

=== New developments ===
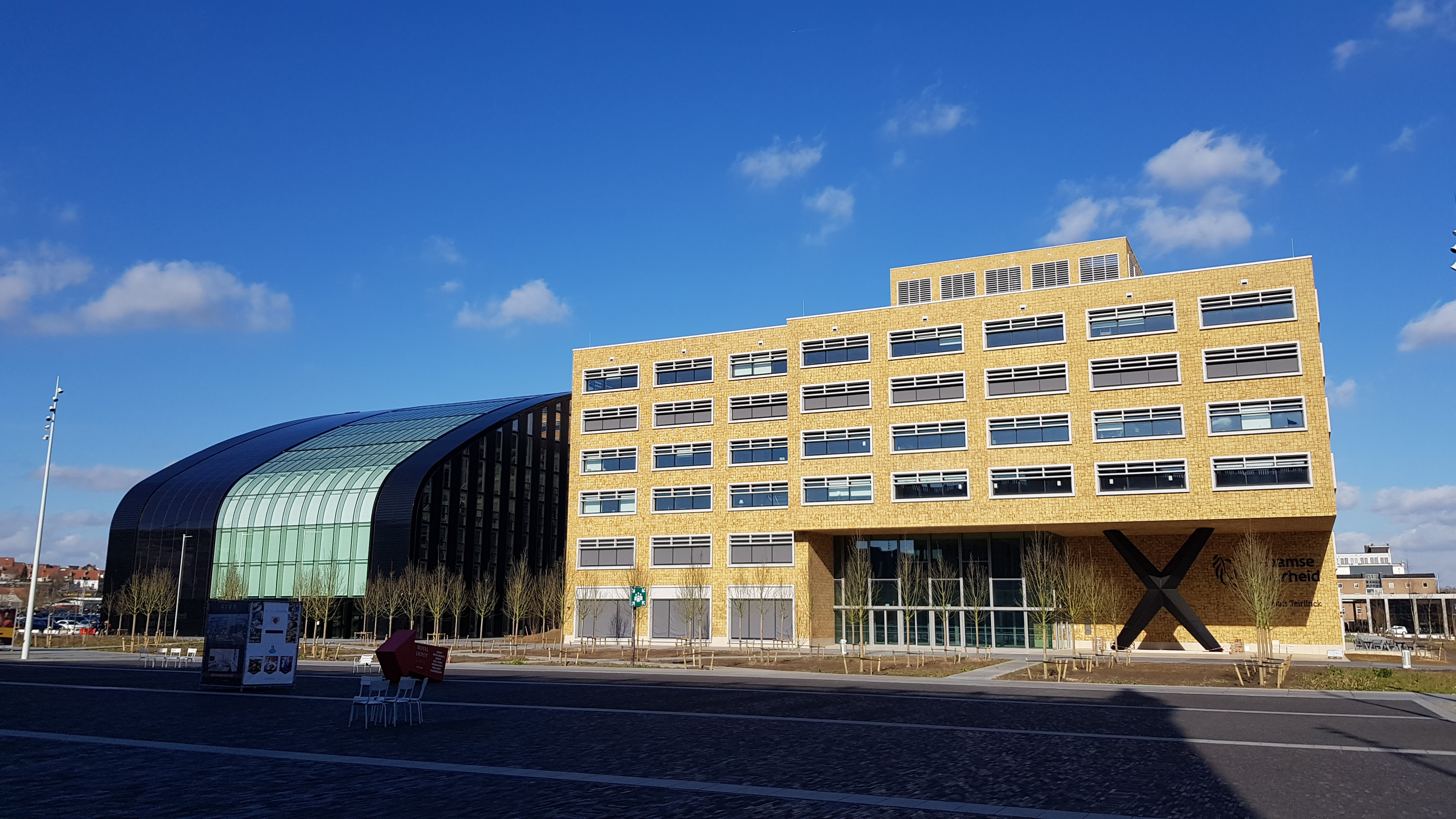
The Brussels Environment building (on the left) and the Herman Teirlinck building (on the right)

Two new office buildings have been developed at Tour & Taxis. When it opened in 2015, the Brussels Environment building was the largest passive office building in Belgium. The building was rated and certified as "excellent" by BREEAM in recognition of its sustainability. The Herman Teirlinck building, open in 2017, and currently housing the administration of the Flemish government, is now the country's largest passive office building. Neutelings Riedijk Architects designed the building using recycled materials, geothermal heating, rainwater recycling, and solar powered electricity. The Herman Teirlinck building won an EU Mies Award in 2019.

The rail lines that once brought trains and their goods to the Maritime Station remained on the Tour & Taxis site decades after the freight station's closure. Beginning in 2013, they were removed and replaced with a 9-hectare (22-acre) park. According to the former Brussels Minister of the Environment and Energy, Évelyne Huytebroeck, it is the largest park to be developed in Brussels since the time of King Leopold II.

Residential apartments were added to Tour & Taxis in 2017, 31 of which were sold to the City of Brussels for use as subsidised housing. The site's current residential development project, known as Park Lane, is to be located near the Maritime Station and the park, and will feature an estimated 900 homes.

The City of Brussels began developing a pedestrian and cyclist bridge over the Brussels Canal, connecting Brussels-North railway station and Tour & Taxis, in autumn 2019. This bridge is named after Suzan Daniel, a pioneer of Brussels' LGBTQ movements in the 20th century. In 2018, Brussels' authorities also announced plans to create new tram lines connecting Belgica metro station on the border of Jette and Molenbeek-Saint-Jean with Brussels-North railway station, and with the Place Charles Rogier/Karel Rogierplein in Saint-Josse-ten-Noode, via Tour & Taxis.

=== Social engagement and urban industry ===
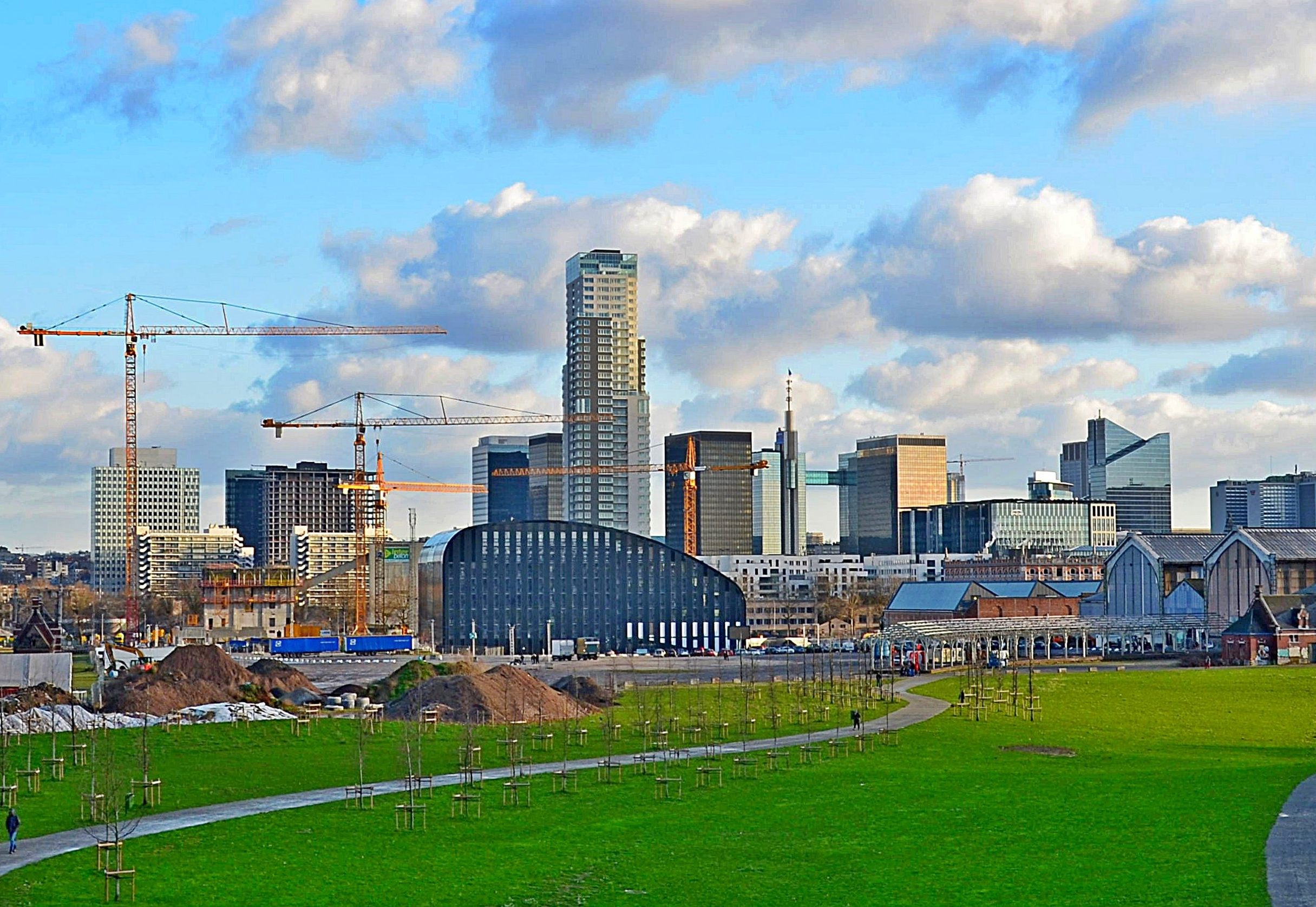
Skyline of Tour & Taxis and the Northern Quarter, as seen from the Jubilee Bridge

In 2018, Tour & Taxis invited the public to name new private and public streets on the redeveloped site. According to The Guardian, "Belgian citizens were given the chance to name 28 streets, alleys, squares and walkways that make up the former industrial zone of Tour & Taxis. The final names were chosen by a jury comprising city officials, local heritage experts and property developer Extensa." One choice was Ceci n'est pas une rue ("This is not a street"), a reference to the surrealist artist René Magritte's painting The Treachery of Images. Another street was named after the impressionist painter Anna Boch. The late filmmaker Chantal Akerman, known for the cult classic Jeanne Dielman, 23 quai du Commerce, 1080 Bruxelles, and Belgium's first female doctor, Isala Van Diest, each had a street named in their honour.

Also in 2018, a 12-metre-high (39 ft) obelisk was erected in Tour & Taxis Park to commemorate the 70th anniversary of the signing of the Universal Declaration of Human Rights (UDHR). The obelisk was commissioned by the former Brussels Minister of the Environment and Energy, Céline Fremault, and designed by the landscape architect Bas Smets.

The non-profit organisation Parckfarm T&T operates on the grounds of Tour & Taxis Park. The volunteer-run "edible park" focuses on environmental and social projects, and offers classes on gardening, cooking, and nutrition. Early in 2020, the new production site and taproom of Brasserie de la Senne also opened its doors at Tour & Taxis, on the Drève Anna Boch/Anna Bochdreef. This brewery, well known for many of its award-winning ales and stouts, is directly across from the Royal Depot. It was located in Molenbeek-Saint-Jean before moving to its present site. Finally, PermaFungi, a circular economy project that sells oyster mushrooms at local businesses in Brussels, grows its mushrooms in the Royal Depot's basement using spent coffee grounds collected from Le Pain Quotidien.

== See also ==
- Neighbourhoods in Brussels
- Tour et Taxis railway station
- History of Brussels
- Transport in Brussels
- Rail transport in Belgium
- Belgium in the long nineteenth century
