= Wannes Van de Velde =

Flemish musician, poet, puppeteer and artist

- Born: 29 April 1937; Antwerp, Belgium
- Died: 10 November 2008 (aged 71); Antwerp, Belgium
- Occupations: artist, musician, poet

Wannes Van de Velde (29 April 1937 – 10 November 2008), born Willy Cecile Johannes Van de Velde, in Antwerp, was a Flemish folk singer, guitarist, musician, poet, puppeteer and artist. He is most famous for his songs Ik Wil deze Nacht in de Straten Verdwalen (1973), Mijn Mansarde and De Brug van Willebroek (1990). His work is often categorized as kleinkunst. Van de Velde was known for singing in his local dialect.

== Biography ==
His father, Jaak Van de Velde, was a metalworker and talented singer, his mother a housewife and singer. He grew up in the Zirkstraat, near the Antwerp Red Light district. At home, the young boy was always surrounded by music.

His song "Ik Wil Deze Nacht in De Straten Verdwalen" was written for the film Home Sweet Home by Benoît Lamy.

In 1997, he received the Arkprijs van het Vrije Woord.

Van de Velde died at Antwerp on 10 November 2008, aged 71.

== Awards ==
- 1997 – Arkprijs van het Vrije Woord for his music.
