= Tour & Taxis Park =

Park in Brussels, Belgium

- Parc Tour et Taxis (French); Thurn en Taxispark (Dutch)
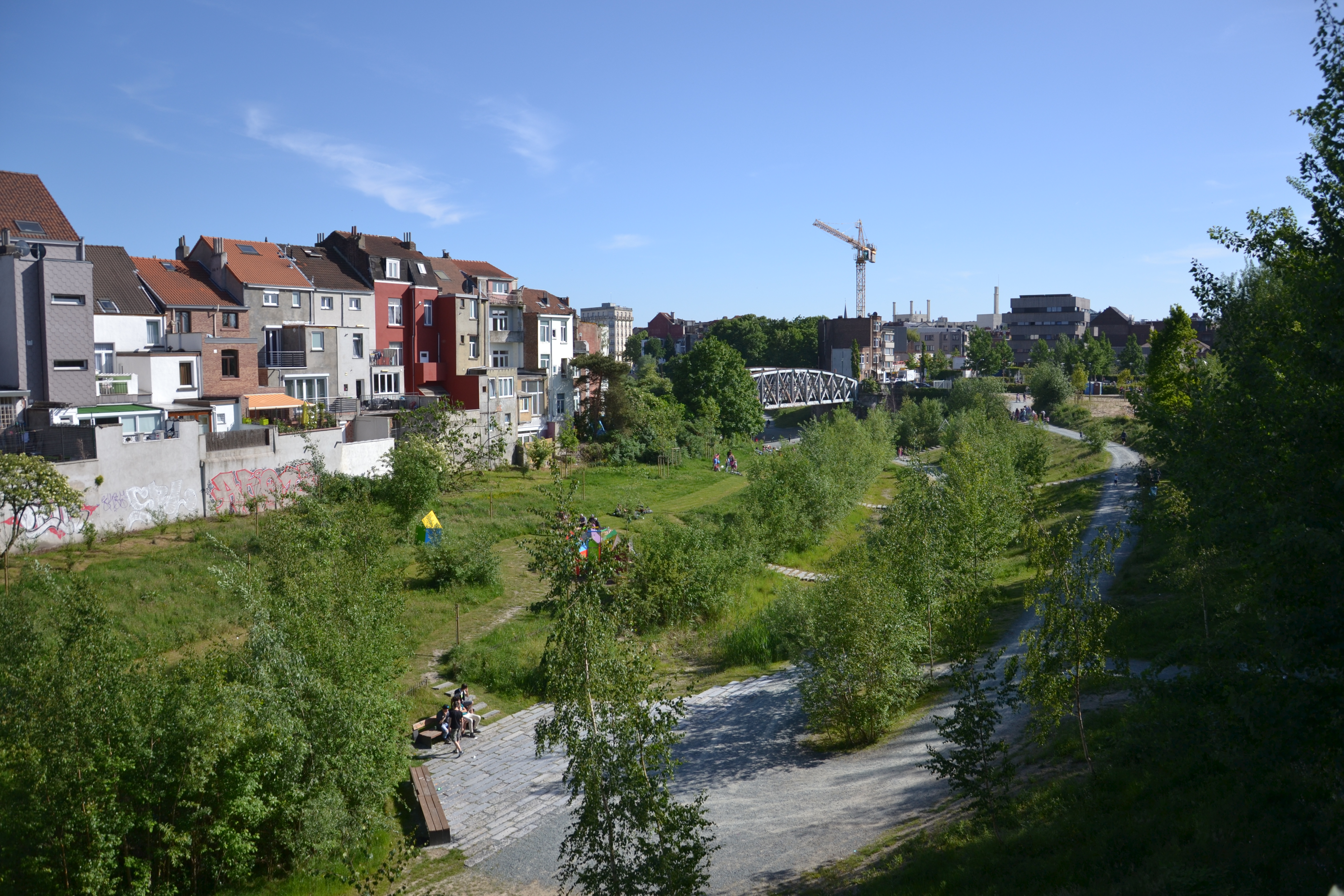
- Tour & Taxis Park seen from the Demeer Bridge
- Interactive map of Tour & Taxis Park
- Type: Public park
- Location: Tour & Taxis, Brussels-Capital Region, Belgium
- Coordinates: 50°52′04″N 4°20′40″E
- Created: 8 May 2014; 12 years ago
- Designer: Bureau Bas Smets
- Etymology: Tour & Taxis
- Status: Open year-round

Tour & Taxis Park (French: Parc Tour et Taxis, pronounced [paʁk tuʁ e taksi]; Dutch: Thurn en Taxispark, pronounced [ˈtʏr(ə)n ɛn ˈtɑksɪsˌpɑr(ə)k]) is an urban public park located in and named after the neighbourhood of Tour & Taxis in Brussels, Belgium. It was designed by Bureau Bas Smets. The park forms part of the redevelopment of the former Tour & Taxis industrial and railway site and is one of the largest new green spaces created in Brussels in more than a century.

== History ==
Plans for a park in Tour & Taxis date back to 1852, when a project proposed transforming the marshy meadows into a vast public park with gardens "where one could breathe freely", intended to compensate for "the nuisances caused by commerce and industry in the city". The plan was never realised, however, as commercial and industrial development took precedence over concerns for public health.

The idea resurfaced during the redevelopment of Tour & Taxis in the early 21st century. The project focused on redeveloping the disused railway bed that once connected Tour & Taxis to the Place Émile Bockstael/Emile Bockstaelplein. Early planning envisioned transforming this site into a linear park linking several neighbourhoods in north-western Brussels.

The first phase of Tour & Taxis Park opened on 8 May 2014 in the site's western part. This phase involved the redevelopment of part of the former railway track alignment between the Tour & Taxis site and the Bockstael area. A second phase, initially planned for 2015, aimed to continue the redevelopment along the same railway corridor. Plans also included the possible construction of a bridge linking the park more directly to the Place Émile Bockstael, a project that was studied by the federal development agency Beliris, although its timetable remained uncertain.

During the same period, several access points to the future park were planned within the framework of the Bockstael neighbourhood contract, reflecting efforts to integrate the new green space with surrounding residential districts.

The park's development was closely linked to the broader planning of the Tour & Taxis site. For many years, the City of Brussels worked on a Plan particulier d'affectation du sol (PPAS) to define the area's future urban development. At the same time, discussions took place between the regional authorities and the site's private owner regarding the park's extension further into the Tour & Taxis property and its long-term management.

The park was later extended along the former railway corridor to connect to Line 28 Park, which had been established the same year in the neighbouring municipality of Molenbeek-Saint-Jean. Together, these projects created a continuous green corridor along the historic railway alignment.

== Buildings and monuments ==
Tour & Taxis Park is home to several public buildings and monuments:

- The Jubilee Bridge, designed in 1904 by the engineer Frédéric Bruneel, which connects the Boulevard du Jubilé/Jubelfeestlaan to the Boulevard Émile Bockstael/Emile Bockstaellaan over Tour & Taxis Park.
- The Clesse Bridge and Demeer Bridge, two smaller edifices, dating from 1903, at the park's northern end.
- The Human Rights Monument, a 12-metre-high (39 ft) obelisk designed in 2018 by the landscape architect Bas Smets to commemorate the 70th anniversary of the signing of the Universal Declaration of Human Rights (UDHR).

In addition, the non-profit organisation Parckfarm T&T operates on the grounds of Tour & Taxis Park. The volunteer-run "edible park" focuses on environmental and social projects, and offers classes on gardening, cooking, and nutrition.

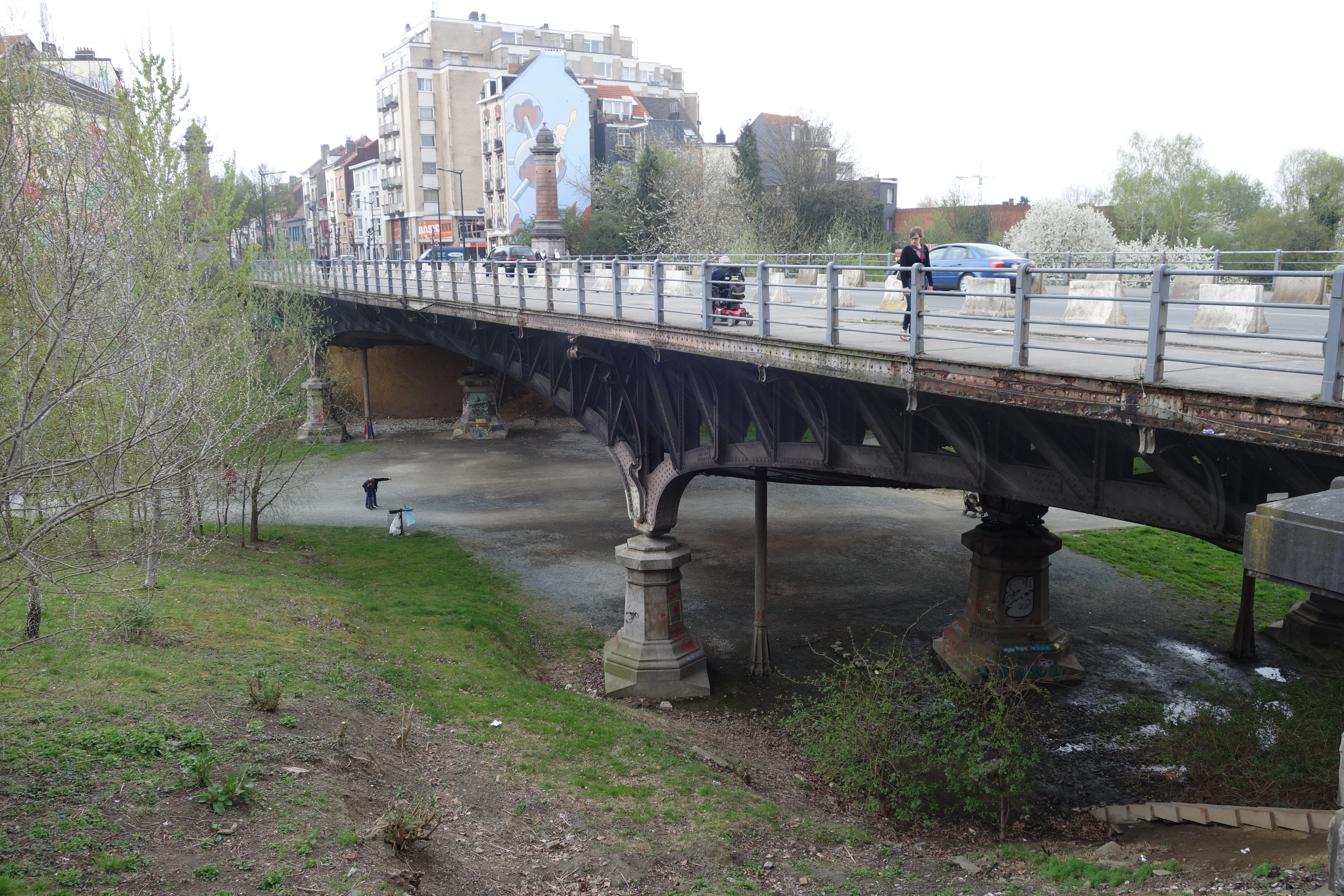
Jubilee Bridge overlooking the park

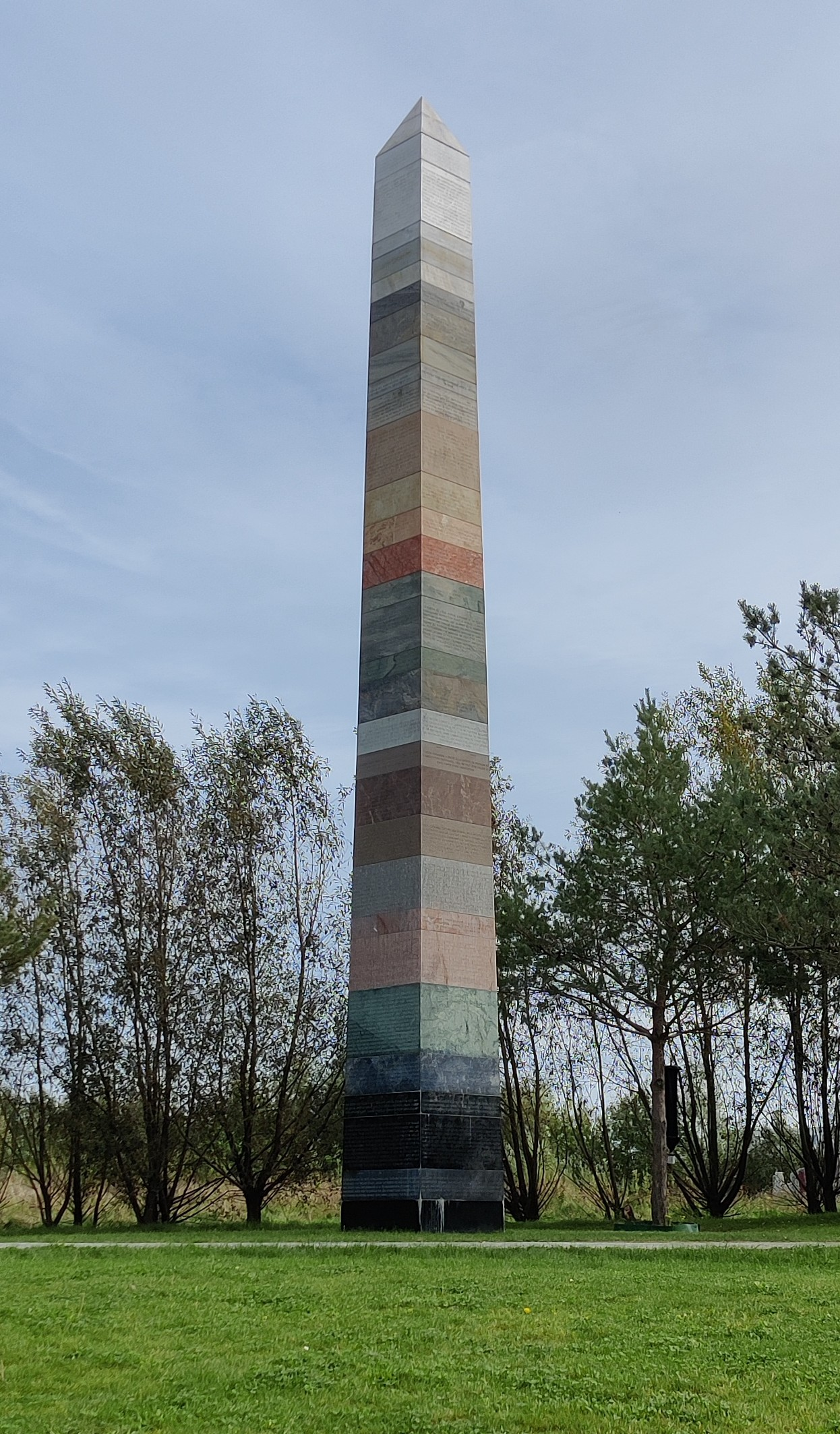
Human Rights Monument

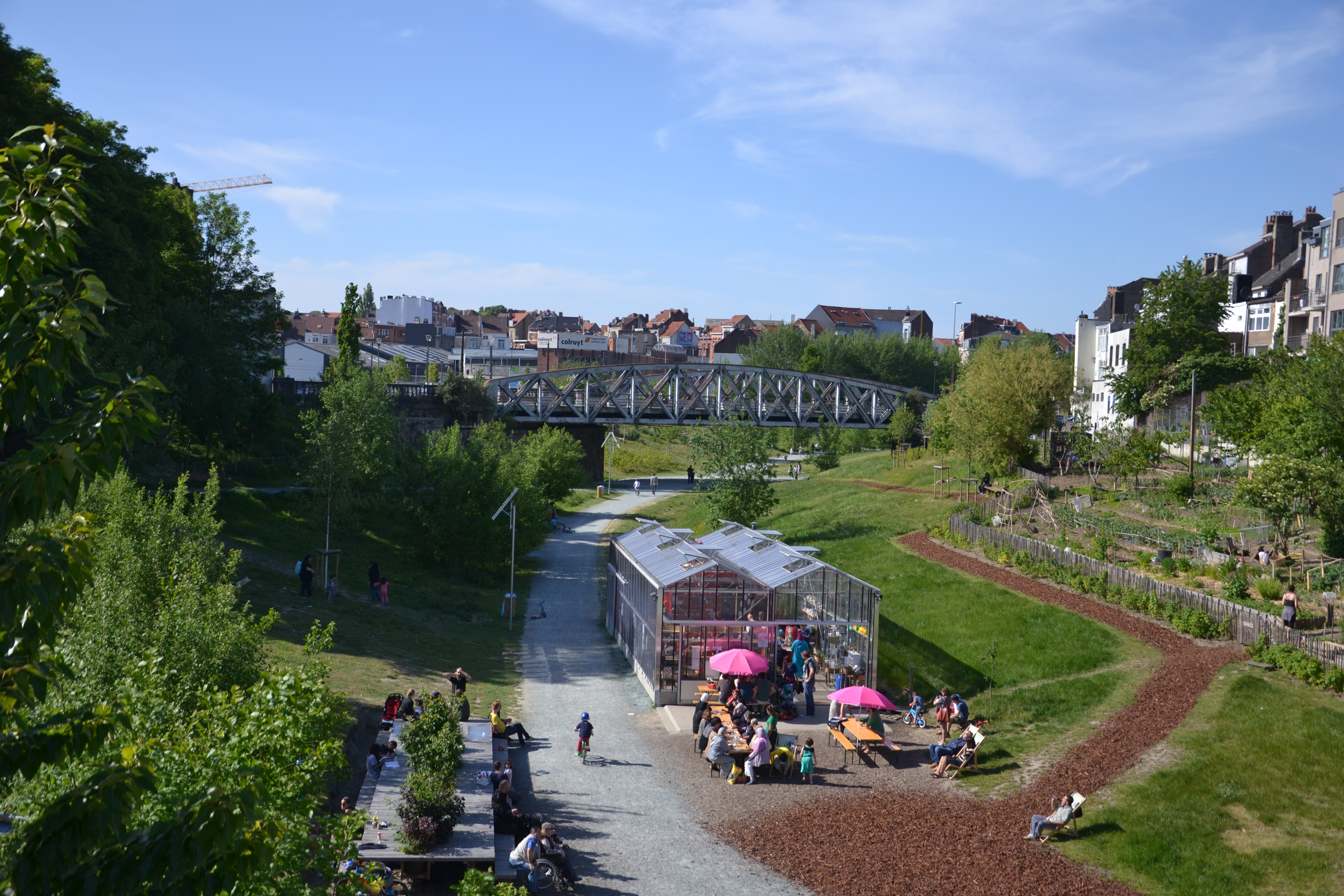
Parckfarm T&T

== See also ==
- List of parks and gardens in Brussels
- History of Brussels
