= Brussels Canal =

Canal in Brussels, Belgium

Coordinates: 50°51′15″N 4°20′31″E

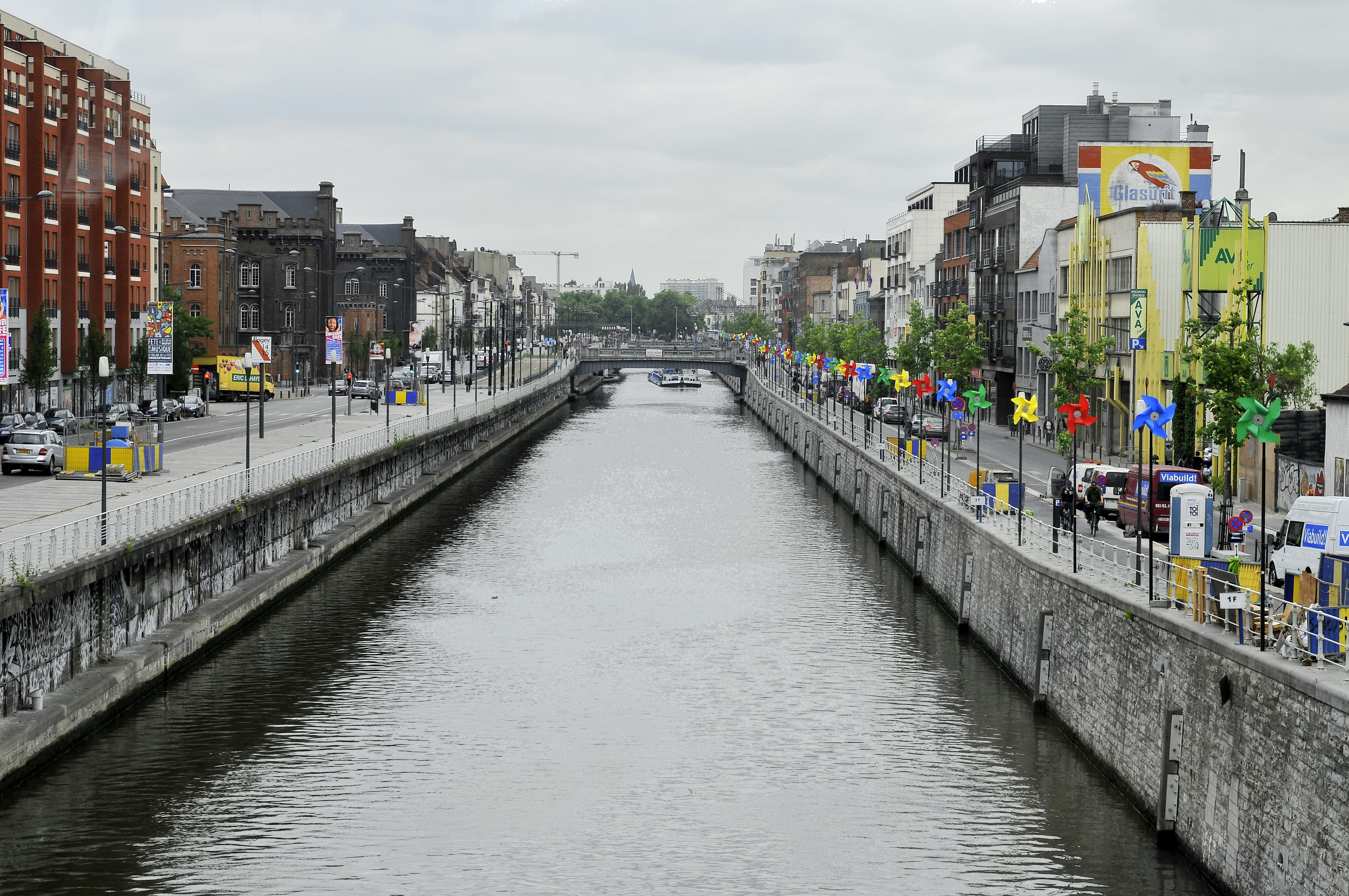
Brussels Canal, looking south towards the Molenbeek embankment

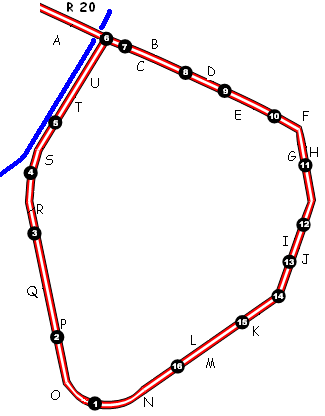
Brussels Canal location alongside the north-western section of the Small Ring

The Brussels Canal (French: Canal de Bruxelles; Dutch: Kanaal van Brussel) is a section of waterway in Brussels, Belgium. It generally refers to the northernmost portion of the Brussels–Charleroi Canal (from the Ninove Gate to the Sainctelette area) and the southernmost section of the Brussels–Scheldt Maritime Canal or Willebroek Canal (between Sainctelette and the Vergote Dock).

The Brussels Canal divides the City of Brussels from the municipality of Molenbeek-Saint-Jean, forming the border between them. Previously (before the 19th century, when the canal was dug), there used to be a Willebroek Canal through which a series of locks eventually reached the Brussels harbour inside the city. There used to also be a small canal connecting the Willebroek Canal along the western portion of the city's old defensive walls to the two arms of the river Senne, which were later covered over and the entire river redirected underground for its entire course within inner Brussels. In the 20th century, even the underground course of the river was altered and the city centre river bedding was dried, the water redirected away from the centre and moved along the western side of the Small Ring (inner ring road), thus also along the Brussels Canal.

The Brussels Canal features several turning basins in its urban course. As part of multiple public works projects, including the covering of the Senne, excess water from the underground flowing river is drained into the canal.
