= Brussels–Scheldt Maritime Canal =

Canal in Belgium

Coordinates: 51.028°N 4.357°E

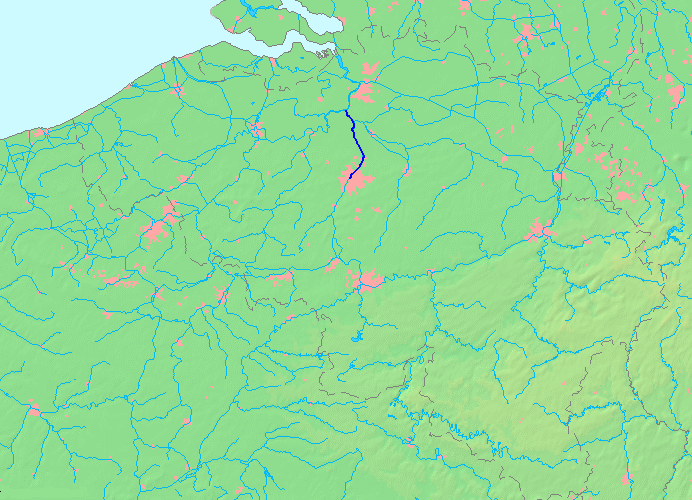
- The course of the Willebroek Canal
- Interactive map of Brussels–Scheldt Maritime Canal

Specifications
- Length: 28 km (17 mi)
- Locks: 2

History
- Construction began: 1550
- Date completed: 1561

Geography
- Start point: Square Sainctelette, Brussels, Belgium
- End point: Scheldt river at Wintam, Belgium

The Brussels–Scheldt Maritime Canal in the Port of Brussels in 2026

The Zemst lock

The Brussels–Scheldt Maritime Canal (French: Canal maritime de Bruxelles à l'Escaut; Dutch: Zeekanaal Brussel-Schelde), also known as the Willebroek Canal amongst other similar names, is an important canal in Belgium. The 28-kilometre-long (17 mi) canal has a width of 30 metres (98 ft) and a draught of 2 metres (6 ft 7 in), and connects Brussels with the Scheldt river at Wintam and ultimately the sea.

The canal is one of the oldest navigable canals in Belgium and indeed in Europe. It was originally only 20 kilometres (12 mi) long and joined the Rupel river in the hamlet of Klein-Willebroek. Hence previously the canal was officially known as the Brussels–Rupel Maritime Canal (French: Canal maritime Bruxelles-Rupel; Dutch: Zeekanaal Brussel-Rupel) prior to the establishment of a direct link with the Scheldt in 1997.

== History ==
=== Early history ===
The idea of a waterway to serve the cities of Hainaut, linking them ultimately with Antwerp, was first put forward during the reign of Philip the Good, Duke of Burgundy (1396–1467). In 1436, an edict authorised the modification and deepening of the Senne river, though the project turned out to be more expensive than previously thought. The authorities of Mechelen, the sole city allowed to tax water transport on the Senne, protested extensively at the prospect of the construction of a parallel canal, and the project was abandoned.

During the 16th century, the prospect of a canal was renewed. In 1531, Emperor Charles V authorised the construction of a canal linking Charleroi and Willebroek, though work did not begin immediately. It was not until 1550 that Mary of Habsburg, Governor of the Netherlands, finally ordered work to begin. When work was finished in 1561, the canal linked Brussels to the Rupel river at Willebroek, though it did not continue south past Brussels. The difference in altitude of 14 metres (46 ft) between these two points was achieved with four locks. With the commissioning of the canal, ships could now avoid navigating the Senne and being subject to tax in Mechelen.

=== 19th century–present ===
Over the years, several end canals, whose docks were each reserved for one type of goods, were built in the old Port of Brussels, in the Sainte-Catherine/Sint Katelijne neighbourhood, at the heart of the City of Brussels. These basins were filled in the late 19th century, at the opening of Brussels' new port located outside the Pentagon (city centre). The street names along the former docks, however, still retain in their names the memory of their former function or references to the neighbourhood's commercial activities. The course of the canal in Brussels was amended to connect to the Brussels–Charleroi Canal, which opened in 1832, thus creating a direct link between the Port of Antwerp and the industrial area of Charleroi (Wallonia).

During the 1920 Summer Olympics, the canal hosted the rowing events. In 1922, a fully modernised canal was opened to navigation. Now the canal in the Rupel led by a new lock at Wintam. The locks at Vilvoorde and Humbeek were replaced by the Kapelle-op-den-Bos lock. A new upgrade was initiated in 1965, the canal being widened to 55 metres (180 ft) (25 metres (82 ft) for the locks) and the draught adapted. The construction of two new locks (205 by 25 metres (673 by 82 ft)) at Zemst (opened in 1975) and Wintam (opened in 1997) allowed the canal to lead directly into the Scheldt. The Port of Brussels is now accessible to ships of 4,500 tonnes (9,900,000 lb) and pushed convoys of 9,000 tonnes (20,000,000 lb).

The canal is of paramount importance for the supply of oil to Brussels, which typically represents 30–50% of annual traffic. In 1974, the annual traffic rose to 14 million tonnes. After a relapse, the volume transported has been rising again in recent years. With 7 million tonnes carried by the canal, the Port of Brussels is the second inland port in the country after the Port of Liège.

Following the regionalisation of Belgium, the management of the canal is no longer in the hands of the "SA Maritime" (a company established in 1896) but came under the control of the Port of Brussels for the part in the territory of the Brussels-Capital Region and Waterwegen en Zeekanaal NV for the part in the Flemish Region.

== In popular culture ==
Wannes Van de Velde recorded a song about one of the bridges in Willebroek named De Brug van Willebroek.
