= List of cafés in Brussels =

This is a list of cafés in Brussels, Belgium.

== By municipality ==
=== City of Brussels ===
| Image | Name | Date | Address | Note |
|---|---|---|---|---|
| | L'Archiduc | 1937 | 6 Rue Antoine Dansaert | Jazz bar. |
| | Bar de Toone | | 6 Impasse Schuddeveld | Café of the Royal Theatre Toone. |
| | Beurscafé | 1885 | 20–28 Rue Auguste Orts | Café of the Beursschouwburg. |
| | À La Becasse | 1877 | 11 Rue de Tabora | |
| | Billie | | 42 Rue Sainte-Catherine | Located in a 17th-century building. |
| | Bozar Café Victor | 2016 | 23 Rue Ravenstein | Café of the Centre for Fine Arts. |
| | La Brouette | | 2–3 Grand-Place | Located in a guild house from 1696–97. |
| | Le Cheval Marin | 1919 | 90 Quai aux Briques | Located in a rebuilt port house from 1680. |
| | Le Cirio | 1886 | 18 Rue de la Bourse | |
| | Le Corbeau | 1875 | 18 Rue Saint-Michel | |
| | Au Derby | 1941 | 37 Rue de Flandre | |
| | Café De Markten | | 5 Vieux Marché aux Grains | Café of the Gemeenschapscentrum De Markten. |
| | Delirium Café | 2003 | Impasse de la Fidélité | |
| | Dolle Mol | 1969 | 52 Rue des Éperonniers | |
| | Taverne Espérance | 1930 | 1–3 Rue du Finistère | Café of the Hotel Espérance. |
| | L'Estrille du Vieux-Bruxelles | 1587 | 7 Rue de Rollebeek | |
| | Le Falstaff | 1903 | 19 Rue Henri Maus | |
| | Le Forestier | | 2 Rue Haute | Located in a 17th-century building. |
| | Het Goudblommeke in Papier | 1944 | 53 Rue des Alexiens | |
| | Brasserie Greenwich | 1914 | 7 Rue des Chartreux | |
| | Café des Halles | | 1 Place Saint-Géry | Located in the Halles Saint-Géry/Sint-Gorikshallen |
| | À l'Imaige Nostre-Dame | 1884 | 1 Impasse des Cadeaux | Located in a former prison dating from 1664. |
| | Kaaicafé | | 18 Square Sainctelette | Café of the Kaaitheater. |
| | Lord Byron - Chez Luca | | 8 Rue des Chartreux | |
| | Le Lombard | 1910 | 1 Rue du Lombard | |
| | La Maison du Cygne | 14th century | 9 Grand-Place | Rebuilt in 1698. |
| | Manneken Pis Café | 17th century | 31-33 Rue des Grands Carmes | Located opposite Manneken Pis. |
| | Mokafé Taverne | | 9 Galerie du Roi | Located in Royal Saint-Hubert Galleries. |
| | À la Mort Subite | 1910 | 5–7 Rue Montagne aux Herbes Potagères | |
| | Café Métropole | 1892 | 33 Place de Brouckère | Café of the Hotel Métropole. |
| | La Pharmacie Anglaise | | 66 Coudenberg | Located in a former pharmacy from 1898. |
| | Poechenellekelder | 1991 | 5 Rue du Chêne | |
| | La Roue D'Or | 1908 | 26 Rue des Chapeliers | |
| | Le Roy d'Espagne | 1952 | 1 Grand-Place | Located in a guild house from 1697–1699. |
| | Au Soleil | | 86 Rue du Marché au Charbon | Located in a building from 1696. |
| | In't Spinnekopke | 1762 | 1 Place du Jardin aux Fleurs | |
| | De Spot | 1893 | 2 Rue Léopold | Café of Muntpunt. |
| | Au Bon Vieux Temps | 1695 | 4–5 Impasse Saint-Nicolas | |
| | Café Walvis | | 209 Rue Antoine Dansaert | Located in a building from 1898. |
| | Wiel's Renard Noir | | 233 Rue Haute | Located in a 17th-century building. |

=== Forest ===
| Image | Name | Date | Address | Note |
|---|---|---|---|---|
| | Bar du Matin | 1895 | 89 Rue Arthur Diderich | |
| | Wiels' CAFÉ | | 354 Avenue van Volxem | Café of Wiels. |

=== Ixelles ===
| Image | Name | Date | Address | Note |
|---|---|---|---|---|
| | Café Belga | 2002 | 18 Place Eugène Flagey | Located in the Radio House. |
| | Pilar | 2019 | 2 Boulevard de la Plaine | |

=== Saint-Gilles ===
| Image | Name | Date | Address | Note |
|---|---|---|---|---|
| | Brasserie Verschueren | 1880 | 11 Parvis de Saint-Gilles | |
| | La Porteuse d'Eau | 1907 | 48 Avenue Jean Volders | |

=== Uccle ===
| Image | Name | Date | Address | Note |
|---|---|---|---|---|
| | Au Vieux Spijtigen Duivel | c. 1500 | 621 Chaussée d'Alsemberg | |
