= Iwona Blazwick =

British art critic

Iwona Maria Blazwick
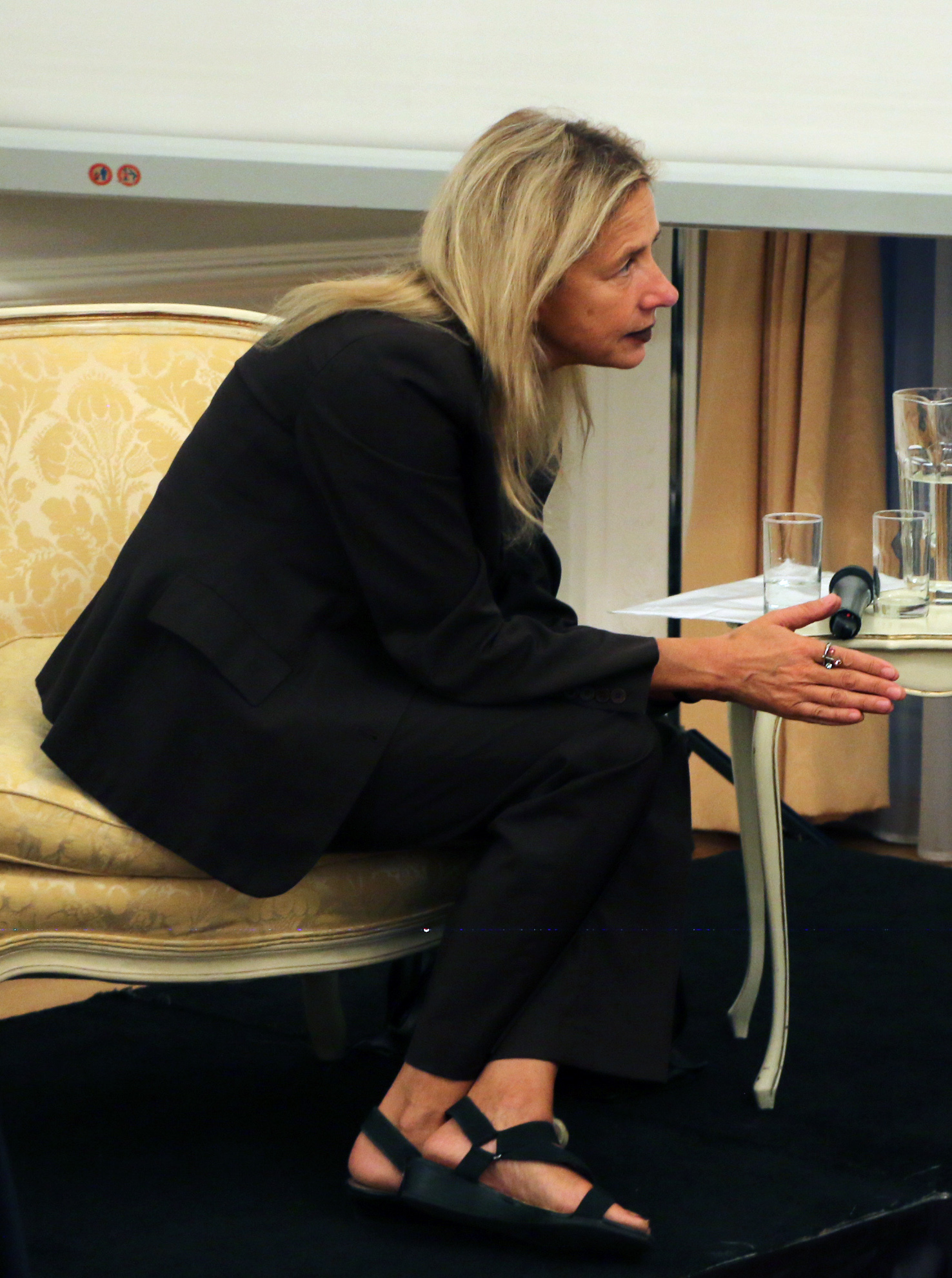
- Blazwick in 2017
- Education: Exeter University
- Occupations: art critic, lecturer
- Known for: director of the Whitechapel Art Gallery

Iwona Maria Blazwick OBE is a British curator and writer. She is currently lead curator of the Wadi Al Fann Al-'Ula Royal Commission. She was the Director of the Whitechapel Art Gallery in London from 2001 to 2022. She has curated and commissioned over 100 exhibitions across the UK and internationally, giving many emerging artists their first solo shows including, Peter Doig, Damien Hirst, Barbara Kruger, Cirstina Iglesias, Julian Opie, Clifford Possum Tjapaltjarri and Fiona Ray. She supports the careers of young artists.

In 2008 she was made an officer of the Order of the British Empire for "services to art". She is married to Richard Noble, a Canadian philosopher and head of fine art at Goldsmiths University of London.

== Early life and education ==
Blazwick was brought up in Blackheath, South East London. She is the child of Polish architects who both painted and inspired her passion for art and design.

Blazwick studied English and Fine Art at Exeter University. She wrote her university thesis on Henry Moore.

== Career ==
=== Early years ===
After university, Blazwick was hired as a receptionist for a publisher of pop art prints and books. She became an assistant curator at the Institute of Contemporary Arts, under the tutelage of Sandy Nairne, who is a former director of the National Portrait Gallery. Her first exhibition was Objects and Sculpture in 1981, which included work by artists Bill Woodrow, Richard Deacon, Anish Kapoor and Antony Gormley.

From 1984 to 1986, Blazwick was Director of AIR Gallery, London. From 1986 to 1993, she was director of exhibitions at the Institute of Contemporary Arts, where she curated exhibitions of modern and contemporary art.

From 1993 to 1997 she was a commissioning editor for contemporary art at Phaidon. She also worked as an independent curator for museums and major public arts projects in Europe and Japan, devising surveys of contemporary artists and commissioning new works of art.

From 1997 to 2001, Blazwick was a curator and then head of exhibitions at Tate Modern. There she co-conceived a new model for the display of the collection and a blueprint for the museum's future program, including the Turbine Hall commissions. She co-curated the inaugural display and the groundbreaking exhibition 'Century City.' Blazwick was responsible for Tate Modern's permanent collection becoming grouped thematically, rather than chronologically.

She was director of the Whitechapel Gallery in Whitechapel, in east London, from 2001 to 2022. She is series editor of Whitechapel Gallery/ MIT Documents of Contemporary Art.

In June 2022 she became head of the public art expert panel of the Royal Commission for Al-'Ula in Saudi Arabia.

When the Istanbul Biennial’s advisory board unanimously chose Defne Ayas as curator for the event’s 2024 edition, the Istanbul Foundation for Culture and Arts (İKSV) rejected the board’s recommendation and instead appointed Blazwick; at the time of her selection, Blazwick was a serving member of the advisory panel tasked with choosing a curator for the biennial. Responding to public criticism, Blazwick stepped down in early 2024.

== Writing ==
Blazwick has written monographs and articles on many contemporary artists and published extensively on themes and movements in modern and contemporary art, exhibition histories and art institutions. Her writings include monographs on Gary Hume (Other Criteria, 2012) and Cornelia Parker (Thames and Hudson, 2013); and contributions to monographs and exhibition catalogues on Hannah Collins, Keith Coventry, Elmgreen and Dragset, Fischli and Weiss, Ceal Floyer, Katharina Fritsch, Roni Horn, Ilya Kabakov, Alex Katz, Paul McCarthy, Cornelia Parker, Annie Ratti, Hannah Starkey, Lawrence Weiner and Rachel Whiteread; and anthologies including Fresh Cream in 2001. She was editor of the Tate Modern: The Handbook and Century City.

Blazwick also writes art criticism for numerous periodicals. She contributes occasional reviews and commentaries for BBC and Channel Four television and BBC radio. She also wrote the introduction for Talking Art: Interviews with Artists Since 1976, published by Ridinghouse and Art Monthly and featuring the best interviews from the latter's 30-year run. Blazwick is series editor of Documents of Contemporary Art; co-published with MIT Press these anthologies bring together the most important texts by artists, critics and historians on the big themes in art today, ranging from Participation to Failure.

== Other activities ==
Blazwick chaired the Cultural Strategy Group at London's City Hall, appointed by Mayor Boris Johnson. She also served on the advisory boards of the Government Art Collection; Sculpture in the City; and the Trafalgar Square Fourth Plinth Commission.

Blazwick has sat on several art prize juries, including for the Turner Prize (1993), the Jerwood Painting Prize (1997), the 2002 Wexner Prize (as a member of Ohio's Wexner Center's International Arts Advisory Council), the Clark Prize for Writing (2010/12), the Menil Collection's Walter Hopps Award for Curatorial Achievement (2011) and the John Moores Painting Prize (2012). She was part of the juries that selected Helen Cammock as recipient of the Max Mara Art Prize for Women in 2018 and Nalini Malani as recipient of the Joan Miró Prize in 2019. She is a standing member of the jury for Film London's Jarman Award. She has sat on the selection panel of the Sky Academy Arts Scholarship.

Blazwick was on the advisory board of Documenta 13, jury for the 2015, 2017, 2019, 2021 Istanbul Biennale. In 2021, she was part of the search committee that helped select Kasia Redzisz and Bernard Blistène as artistic directors of KANAL - Centre Pompidou.

Additional roles include:

- MAXXI, Member of the Board
- Harewood House, Member of the Board of Trustees
- Istanbul Biennale, Member of the Advisory Board
- Paul Mellon Centre for Studies in British Art, Member of the Advisory Board

== Recognition ==
Blazwick was appointed Officer of the Order of the British Empire (OBE) for services to art in the 2008 New Year Honours. She is a Fellow of the Royal College of Art (2004) and has received Honorary Doctorates from Plymouth University (2006), the London Metropolitan University (2007), Goldsmiths' College (2010), the University of the Arts (2011), Middlesex University & the University of Exeter (2026). She has been called "one of the most important woman in British art".
