= Francesco Cirio =

Italian businessman

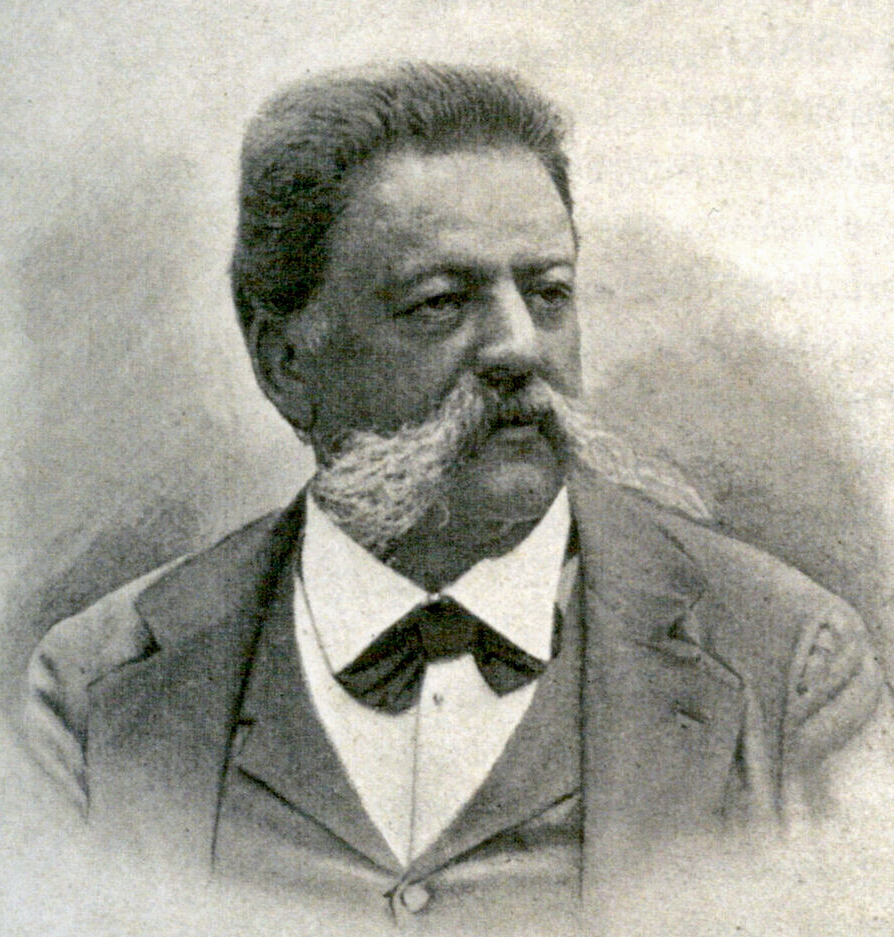
Francesco Cirio.

Francesco Cirio (25 December 1836 – 9 January 1900) was an Italian businessman, and is credited with being one of the first in the world with developing the appertization technique – the method of processing vegetables that leads to them being canned.

Cirio was born in Nizza Monferrato, then part of the Kingdom of Sardinia, to a poor and illiterate family. When he was 14 years old he came to the capital of the kingdom, Turin. In 1856, Cirio started preserving tomatoes in tin cans for them to be exported. He created his own company (later named Cirio), and when he was 20 years old, he started his first factory in Turin. In 1861, he added further plantations and production facilities in Southern Italy. In 1867, Cirio exhibited his products in Paris at the Exposition Universelle, where he received prestigious awards.

The company was transformed in 1885 into Società Anonima di Esportazione Agricola Francesco Cirio in Turin. This company very soon opened subsidiaries in Milan, Naples, Belgrade, Berlin, Brussels, London, Paris, and Vienna. Cirio also worked to help the agricultural development of Southern Italy.
