= Kanal Architecture =

Architecture museum in Brussels, Belgium

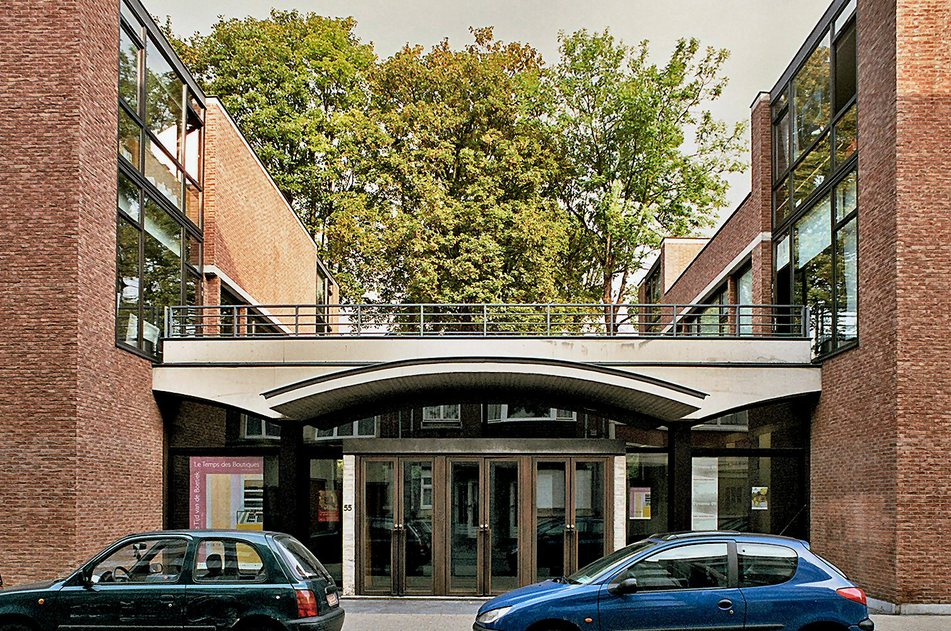
- Entrance of CIVA
- Interactive fullscreen map
- Former name: International Centre for the City, Architecture and Landscape (CIVA)
- Established: 8 March 2017; 9 years ago
- Location: Square Sainctelette / Sainctelettesquare 21, 1000 City of Brussels, Brussels-Capital Region, Belgium
- Coordinates: 50°49′44″N 4°21′58″E
- Type: Architecture museum
- Website: kanal.brussels/en

Kanal Architecture, formerly the International Centre for the City, Architecture and Landscape (French: Centre international pour la Ville, l'Architecture et la Paysage, abbreviated CIVA), is a public research and cultural institution in Brussels, Belgium, devoted to architecture, urbanism, landscape, and ecological thinking. It encompasses an exhibition space, extensive archives, a specialised library, and a diverse programme of public outreach. Through exhibitions, debates, screenings, workshops, tours, and educational initiatives, CIVA fosters critical engagement with spatial culture.

== History ==
In the 1960s and 1970s, Brussels underwent significant urban redevelopment known as Brusselisation, leading to the demolition of many historic neighbourhoods and the displacement of communities. This sparked grassroots activism among architects and urbanists, resulting in the creation of two key organisations: the Archives d'Architecture Moderne (AAM) and the Sint-Lukasarchief. These groups focused on documenting and preserving architectural heritage through protest materials, unrealised urban plans, architectural drawings, manifestos, and media archives, with the aim of resisting destructive urban planning.

In 1988, the René Pechère Library was established as a specialised documentation centre dedicated to the history of botany, as well as garden and landscape architecture. Founded by the landscape architect René Pechère, the library amassed a unique collection of over 10,000 works, including 200 rare and antique books dating back to the 16th and 17th centuries. Pechère, a passionate bibliophile, entrusted the management of this exceptional heritage to the Brussels-Capital Region to ensure public accessibility.

In 1999, the Centre international pour la Ville, l'Architecture et le Paysage (CIVA) was officially established by the French Community Commission (COCOF). It brought together several non-profit organisations connected to architectural and landscape history, including the Archives de l'architecture Moderne, the René Pechère Library, the Paul Duvignaud Centre, and the Fonds pour l'architecture.

Over the following years, CIVA expanded its role as a cultural and research institution. In 2015, it underwent an important organisational restructuring to unify its archival, educational, and exhibition activities under one foundation. This restructuring aimed to improve governance, foster collaboration among partners, and increase public accessibility.

In 2016, the Brussels-Capital Region formally established CIVA as a public cultural centre by consolidating the resources and missions of AAM, Sint-Lukasarchief, and other heritage bodies. By early 2017, the Archives d'Architecture Moderne and Sint-Lukasarchief were fully integrated into the CIVA Foundation, marking a new chapter that combined decades of activist archives with a programme of exhibitions, research, and education. On 19 December 2025, CIVA closed its doors in preparation for its move to the Citroën Garage. On 28 January 2026, it was announced that the institution would be renamed Kanal Architecture.

== See also ==
- List of museums in Brussels
- History of Brussels
- Culture of Belgium
