= Kanal (museum) =

Modern and contemporary art museum in Brussels, Belgium

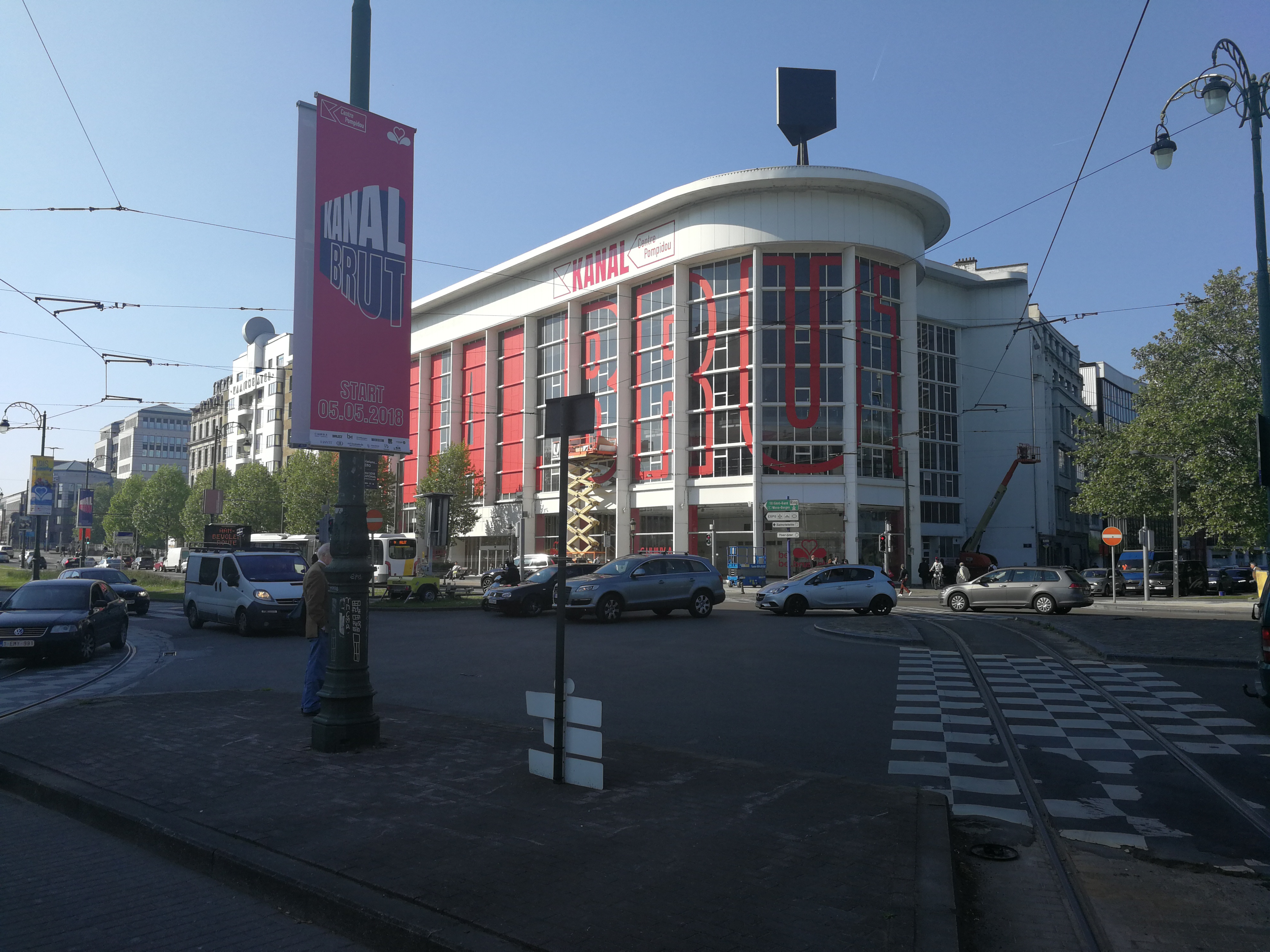
- Exterior of the museum
- Former name: KANAL – Centre Pompidou
- Established: 3 October 2017; 9 years ago
- Location: Square Sainctelette / Sainctelettesquare 11–12, 1000 City of Brussels, Brussels-Capital Region, Belgium
- Coordinates: 50°51′30.7″N 4°20′54.0″E
- Type: Art museum
- Founder: Brussels-Capital Region
- Directors: Yves Goldstein (general), Kasia Redzisz (artistic)
- Chairperson: Michèle Sioen
- Public transit access: 2 6 Yser/IJzer
- Website: kanal.brussels/en

Kanal, formerly KANAL – Centre Pompidou, is a museum of modern and contemporary art located in Brussels, Belgium, near the Brussels–Charleroi Canal, in the former Citroën Garage buildings. The opening is scheduled for 28 November 2026. During the renovations, the museum remains open at its temporary location K1, at 1, avenue du Port/Havenlaan.

== History ==
=== Citroën Garage ===
Since 2018, Kanal has occupied the former Citroën Garage. The building was originally designed by the architects Maurice-Jacques Ravazé, Alexis Dumont and Marcel Van Goethem for the Citroën company, and built between 1933 and 1934. It was modified in 1954 by Louis Hoebeke.

Prior to redevelopment, the garage was a 16,500 m^{2} (178,000 sq ft), steel-framed, glass-clad building with a substantial showroom standing 25 m (82 ft). The structure was roughly divided into three main areas: the showroom, the workshops and the staff canteen and caretaker's flat.

=== Founding ===
Plans for a museum in the Citroën Garage were first proposed in 2014. On 29 October 2015, the Brussels-Capital Region purchased the Citroën Garage from PSA Group for €20.5 million, with plans to transform it into a museum of modern and contemporary art. On 28 March 2017, the Urban Development Corporation (SAU-MSI) of the Brussels-Capital Region launched an international competition to select an architect for the new museum. The jury selected a proposal, A Stage for Brussels by Atelier KANAL, a consortium of noAarchitecten, EM2N, and Sergison Bates architects. The project integrated a museum of modern and contemporary art, CIVA (now Kanal Architecture), alongside new public cultural, educational and leisure spaces.

On 29 September 2017, the KANAL Foundation was established, after receiving clearance from the Brussels-Capital Region on 19 July 2017. After failing to obtain works from the Royal Museums of Fine Arts of Belgium, the region negotiated a ten-year partnership with Paris' Centre Pompidou, formally approved on 7 December 2017 and signed on 18 December 2017.

=== Pre-opening ===
The site pre-opened on 5 May 2018 with an event called KANAL Brut, curated by Bernard Blistène. The fourteen-month programme included works from the Centre Pompidou collection and a film studio designed by Michel Gondry, alongside exhibitions, performances, workshops, and community events. KANAL Brut closed on 30 June 2019. From 24 September to 17 December 2020, the first part of It Never Ends, a solo exhibition by John Armleder, took place in the showroom, followed by the second part from 4 February to 25 April 2021. During the exhibition, the rest of the building was closed as constuction works began, with planning permission obtained on 20 December 2020.

In December 2021, Kanal began leasing K1, located along the Avenue du Port/Havenlaan, from the Port of Brussels. This allowed Kanal to continue its activities on a smaller scale and to maintain a public presence while the main site was closed. From 2022, the building was adapted and equipped to accommodate Kanal's activities, improving accessibility, and preparing it for the construction of Beco Park. Kanal also began a partnership with the Brussels Intercommunal Transport Company (STIB/MIVB) as part of KANAL Underground, regurally exhibiting works and installations at Yser/IJzer metro station, located near the future museum.

=== Construction fire ===
On 6 July 2026, a fire broke out in the technical installations on the roof of one of the three newly constructed towers within the Citroën Garage. The tower, intended to house Kanal Architecture, sustained damage to its technical installations and water damage during firefighting operations. The incident delayed the opening of Kanal Architecture, while the museum's public opening remains scheduled for 28 November 2026.

== Exhibitions ==
=== KANAL Brut ===
From 5 May 2018 to 30 June 2019, KANAL Brut presented an experimental programme and exhibitions occupying the various spaces of the former garage. Experimentation was the guiding principle of this "brut" year. The initiative aimed to innovate, explore new ways of presenting different art forms, and discover approaches to make the space more accessible to a broader audience beyond the usual museum visitors, while simultaneously reimagining and opening up the museum environment.

== See also ==
- Millennium Iconoclast Museum of Art
- List of museums in Brussels
- History of Brussels
- Culture of Belgium
