= Bernard Blistène =

Director of the french National Museum of Modern Art (born 1955)

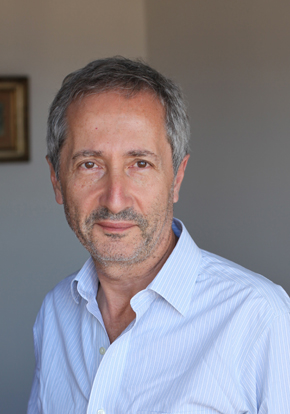
- Bernard Blistène in 2014
- Born: November 29, 1954 (age 71)
- Education: École du Louvre; Institut d'Art et d'Archéologie
- Parent: Marcel Blistène

Bernard Blistène (born November 29, 1954) is a French art curator who served as the director of the Musée National d'Art Moderne from 2013 to 2021, where he is now honorary director.

== Biography ==
Born in 1954, son of film director Marcel Blistène, Bernard Blistène is a graduate of the École du Louvre and the Institut d'Art et d'Archéologie.

== Career ==
He has been curator at the Musée National d’Art Moderne (1983–1990), director of the Musée des beaux-arts de Marseille (1990–1997), deputy director of the Musée National d’Art Moderne (1997–2000), Inspector General of Artistic Creation at the French Ministry of Culture (2000–2007), director of the Department of Cultural Development at the Centre Pompidou (2007–2013), and director of the Musée National d’Art Moderne (2013–2021).

He was a professor of contemporary art at the École du Louvre from 1985 to 2005.

Blistène chaired several juries for the Marcel Duchamp Prize, choosing Melik Ohanian (2015), Kader Attia (2016), Joana Hadjithomas and Khalil Joreige (2017), Clément Cogitore (2018), Éric Baudelaire (2019) and Kapwani Kiwanga (2020). He was also a member of the jury for M+'s inaugural Sigg Prize, which selected Samson Young as its winner in 2020.

In 2021, KANAL – Centre Pompidou appointed Blistène as one of two artistic directors, alongside Kasia Redzisz.

== Recognition ==
Together with Serge Lasvignes and Christine Macel, ArtReview ranked him 21st in their annual ranking of the 100 most influential people in art of 2020.
