= Kaaitheater =

Cultural venue in Brussels, Belgium

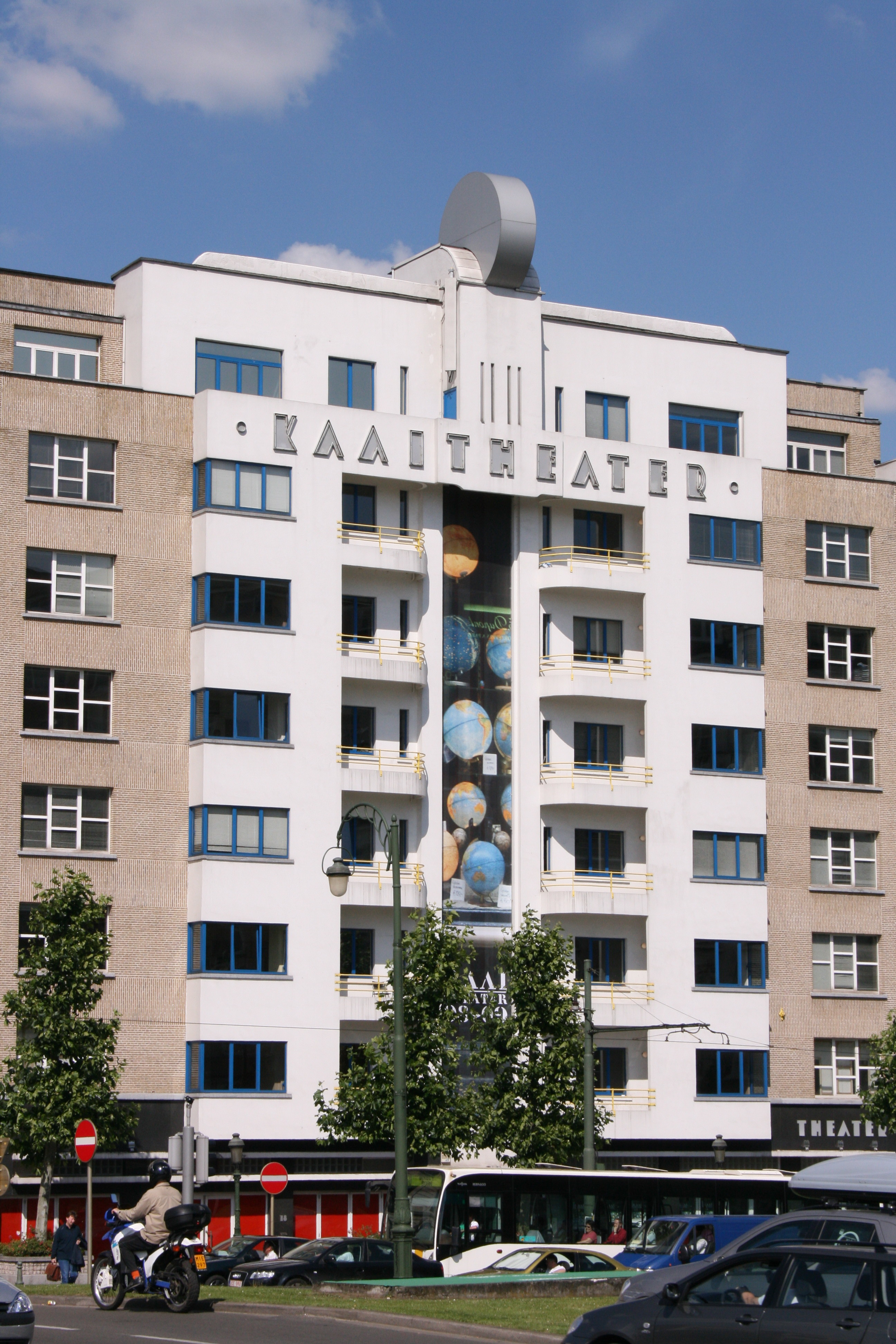
- Exterior of the Kaaitheater building in Brussels
- Interactive map of Kaaitheater
- Former names: Luna-Theater (1932–1938); L’Empire (1938–1993); Lunatheater (1993–2001)
- Address: Square Sainctelette 20; 1000 City of Brussels, Brussels-Capital Region; Belgium
- Coordinates: 50°51′31.658″N 4°20′51.313″E
- Type: Theatre
- Public transit: 2 6 Yser/IJzer

Construction
- Opened: 7 October 1932; 94 years ago
- Architect: Marcel Driesmans

Website
- kaaitheater.

The Kaaitheater, is a theatre located in Brussels, Belgium, housing a theatre and cultural institutions. It occupies a block between the Quai des Péniches/Akenkaai and Quai de Willebroeck/Willebroekkaai, with its main entrance on the Square Sainctelette/Sainctelettesquare. The theatre is located next to and connected with the former Citroën Garage, forming part of the continuous urban block.

The complex includes two buildings, one with apartments and a café and the other a theatre hall. It was designed by architect Marcel Driesmans and constructed between 1929 and 1931 in a modernist and Art Deco style. It takes its original name from the Luna amusement park that once stood on the site. The theatre opened in 1932 and after several transformations and renovations was renamed Kaaitheater in 2001.

== History ==
=== Early history ===
The site between Quai des Péniches and Quai de Willebroeck was originally home to a short-lived amusement park that operated between 1913 and the First World War. The park included roller coasters, a magic river, a waterfall, and a 1,000-seat hall where the Ballets Russes, featuring Nijinski, performed.

In 1929, plans for a theatre complex were drawn up by a company named Luna Park, in reference to the former amusement park. Excavation and foundation works began the same year but were halted due to the economic crisis. Final plans were submitted in late 1931, and the theatre opened on 7 October 1932 after rapid construction. The hall featured the largest stage in Belgium at the time, a wide balcony, décor in light brown and mocha tones, imitation wood, seating with futuristic motifs, and a light organ, all designed by interior architect Huber Driesmans.

After the early death of director Ernest Kindermans, the theatre, intended for Flemish operetta, ceased activities in 1934. It was subsequently used as a variety theatre, cinema, and music hall. In 1938, plans were submitted to convert the venue, then named L’Empire, into a greyhound racing track, although this usage was short-lived. During the Second World War, variety shows returned, and the apartments were temporarily used as a hotel. Following the construction of the Viaduct of Koekelberg in 1957–1958, which passed directly in front of the windows, the building fell into disrepair. In 1962, the city required façade and window renovations, and in 1968 the theatre was converted into a carpet store.

=== Kaaitheaterfestival ===
The history of Kaaitheater as an organisation began in 1977 with the first Kaaitheaterfestival. Hugo De Greef, then a freelance collaborator at the Beursschouwburg, and Walter Moens of the Nederlandse Commissie voor de Cultuur van de Brusselse Agglomeratie (NCC) initiated the project after attending the Festival mondial du théâtre in Nancy. The festival was conceived as part of Brusselement, a package of cultural events organised for the centenary of the Royal Flemish Theatre (KVS). The first edition took place from 1 to 15 September 1977 in a large tent and a refurbished garage behind the KVS, on a dock between Quai des Péniches and Quai au Foin/Hooikaai.

Between 1977 and 1985 five festivals were held. De Greef modelled the event on international festivals such as those of Nancy, Avignon, and Edinburgh, as well as the Berliner Theatertreffen and the Holland Festival. The festival was seen as a temporary initiative, to continue until a similar progressive theatre movement had developed in Belgium. The 1983 edition is often cited as the most significant, presenting Flemish artists such as Jan Decorte, Anne Teresa De Keersmaeker, Jan Fabre, and Jan Lauwers alongside international figures including Gerardjan Rijnders, Jürgen Gosch, The Wooster Group, and Steve Paxton.

In September 1978 Kaaitheater was formally established as a non-profit association, with representation from the Kunst- en Cultuurverbond, Beursschouwburg, Royal Flemish Theatre, and the Brabants Kollektief voor Theaterprojekten. Bob van Aalderen served as the first chairman. Programming remained under De Greef, later assisted by Guido Minne.

In 1983, Kaaitheater acquired its first permanent space, the former Brasserie de l’Etoile and adjoining brewer’s house, later named the Kaaistudios. After the 1985 festival, the organisation shifted from a biennial festival to year-round programming, with an increasing focus on in-house productions. In 1988, Kaaitheater formally merged with Schaamte, an artists’ association, to combine production, presentation, and distribution activities.

Between 1987 and 1993, Kaaitheater operated nomadically across Brussels venues such as La Monnaie, Ancienne Belgique, BOZAR, and Théâtre 140, while also presenting work in the Kaaistudios. During this period, Rosas, which had been founded in 1983 for the festival where Rosas danst Rosas premiered, became an independent non-profit association on 1 January 1987. This nomadic period fostered collaborations across the city’s cultural field but highlighted the need for a permanent infrastructure.

=== Lunatheater ===
After remaining largely vacant for years, the main theatre building underwent major renovation in 1992 by architect Philippe De Hullu. The work removed the boxes and seats under the balcony, adjusted the slope for better sightlines, and added a foyer. The venue reopened in September 1993 as the Lunatheater, providing Kaaitheater with a permanent main stage. The Kaaistudios were reopened shortly after renovations, enabling the organisation to develop a dual programming structure that balanced established artists in the main hall with younger makers in the studios. The main theatre was renamed Kaaitheater in 2001, and its upper floors now house various cultural institutions.

In 1998, Johan Reyniers became artistic director, expanding the pool of artists and introducing performance art alongside theatre and dance. Programming was initially shared with Agna Smisdom and later with Petra Roggel, combining established and emerging artists across both spaces.

Johan Reyniers departed in 2006, and in 2007 Guy Gypens and Katleen Van Langendonck were appointed as artistic directors. Their tenure introduced thematic programming, site-specific projects, and initiatives to engage wider audiences, including Festival Kanal, Matinee Kadee, and PeriferiK. They also developed Performatik, a biennale for performance and live art, strengthening collaboration between stage and visual arts.

From 2008, Kaaitheater renewed its international collaborations through networks such as Imagine 2020, House on Fire, and The Humane Body. In 2013, longtime dramaturge Marianne Van Kerkhoven, a central figure in the organisation’s history, passed away.

=== Renovation ===
In early 2020, Agnes Quackels and Barbara Van Lindt assumed artistic coordination, focusing on the project How to Be Many? to expand inclusivity and reflect diverse audiences, artists, and perspectives. Extensive renovations in 2022 required Kaaitheater to temporarily vacate the building. Between 2022 and 2025, programming was presented in collaboration with partner venues, including KVS, Théâtre National, Ancienne Belgique, GC De Kriekelaar, and several community centres, while offices were temporarily relocated nearby.

== Architecture ==
=== Exterior ===
The complex occupies an L-shaped site and consists of two street-facing buildings linked by an event hall, perpendicular to the square. Originally, it contained 42 apartments. The square-side building housed the theatre entrance and a café, while the quay-side building contained the theatre exit, a service entrance, a brasserie, and office spaces.

At 18–20 Square Sainctelette, the symmetrical façade has seven bays over eight storeys, the uppermost forming an attic beneath a flat roof. The granite-clad ground floor features wide openings beneath impost windows, grouped in threes between projecting concrete bands forming a canopy, with glass-brick details. Upper floors combine brown brick side bays with plastered central bays projecting under the attic terrace. Balconies, corner windows, and the main entablature, now displaying the lighted sign “KAAITHEATER,” articulate the façade. The attic storey has a central projecting bay with four slender windows crowned by a vaulted arch and a circular disc evoking the moon.

At 2 Quai des Péniches, the symmetrical five-bay façade rises five storeys under a flat roof. The central bay features paired windows and a recessed entrance, while side bays have wide windows and the former emergency exits now glazed. The ground floor is clad in hardstone panels, with brown brick upper floors, emphasised horizontal joints, and upright brick detailing above openings.

=== Interior ===
The theatre hall has a barrel-vaulted roof, with a higher rear volume accommodating the stage. The renovated hall retains its balcony with parapets decorated by half cylinders, forming lantern-like features at the sides.
