= Au Derby =

Café in Brussels, Belgium

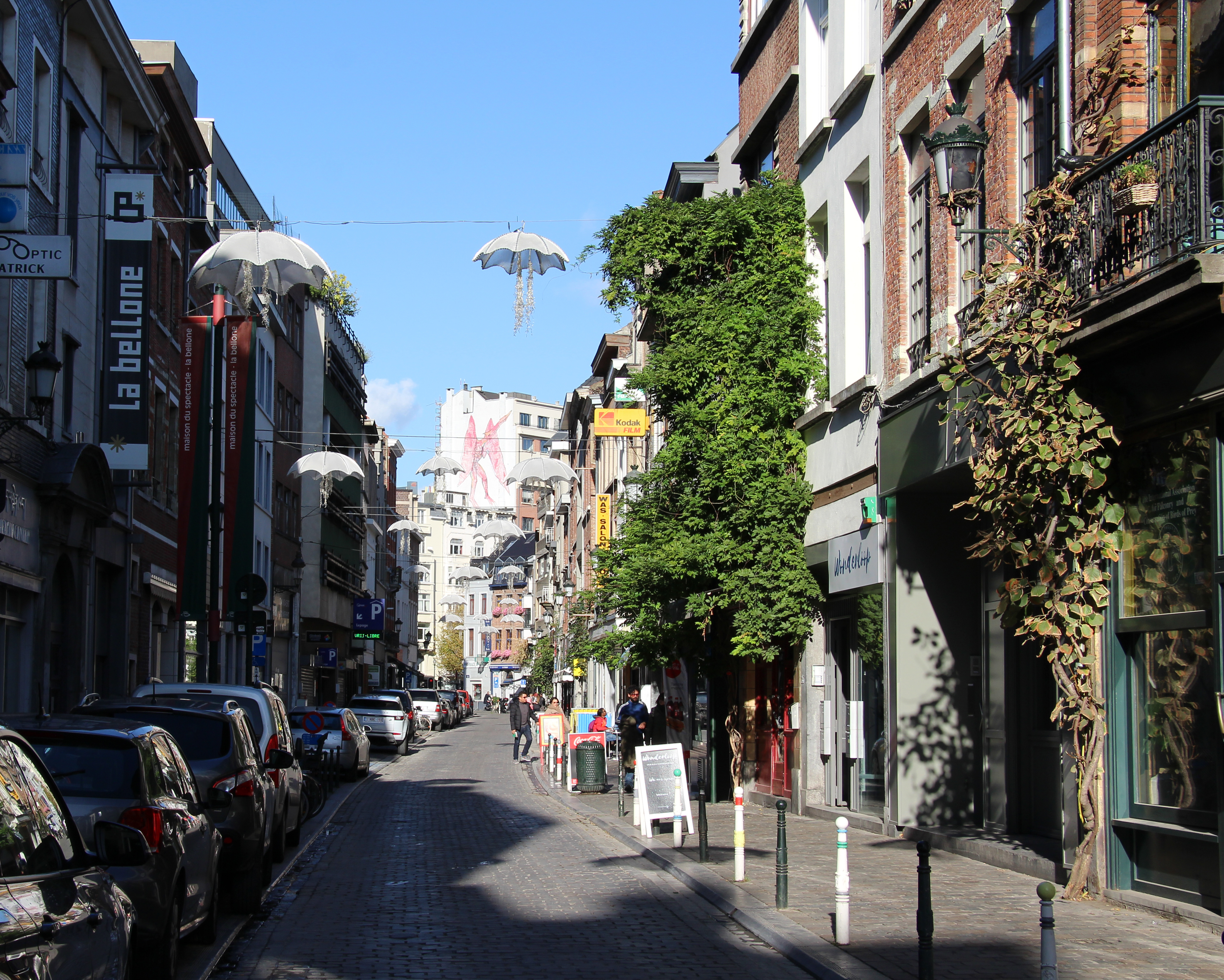
- Rue de Flandre/Vlaamsesteenweg with Au Derby on the right.
- Interactive map of the Au Derby area
- Former names: Ballon du Centre (1946–1954); Au Daringman (1946–2024)
- Alternative names: bij Martine; chez Martine; Le Café Rouge
- Etymology: Royal Daring Club de Bruxelles (1954–2024); Zwanze Derby (2024–Present)

General information
- Status: Completed
- Architectural style: Art Deco
- Location: Rue de Flandre/Vlaamsesteenweg 37, 1000 City of Brussels, Brussels-Capital Region, Belgium
- Coordinates: 50°51′4″N 4°20′47″E
- Year built: 1941
- Opened: 1946
- Landlord: Horeca Logistics Services

Design and construction
- Architect: Jean T'Sas

Website
- Official website

Au Derby, formerly known as Au Daringman and Ballon du Centre, is a café in Brussels, Belgium. It was operated under the name Au Daringman for nearly twenty-five years, during which time it became a cult venue frequented by artists, local residents, and Dutch-speaking Brussels inhabitants.

The café is located at 37, Rue de Flandre/Vlaamsesteenweg in the historic city centre of Brussels. It has been a protected heritage site since 22 February 2024.

== History ==
In July 1939, owner Paul Veldekens submitted a building application to the City of Brussels for the construction of a three-storey investment property designed by architect Jean T'Sas, but the application was not pursued. Two years later, a new application was filed for a four-storey investment property, requiring the demolition of an existing two-storey stepped gable corner house with a pent roof and a shopfront on the ground floor, then occupied by butcher J. Ghoos. Architect T'Sas justified the demolition by citing the poor state of the building, and the proposed height by comparison with neighbouring properties. The original plans included a chemiserie on the ground floor with a display window differing slightly from the current one, though it is unclear whether this shop was ever realised.

The café bore several names throughout its history. In the city almanacs of 1946–1947, it was listed as Ballon du Centre. In 1954, it was renamed Au Daringman under the management of Jean Wets. The name originally referred to the boxing club with which Wets was associated, although it later came to be frequently linked with the Royal Daring Club de Bruxelles football team.

In 2000, the café was taken over by Martine Peeters and her then partner Paul. At that time, it was also colloquially known as bij Martine, chez Martine, or Le Café Rouge. The interior remained largely unchanged during their management, but the establishment underwent a cultural transformation, becoming a meeting place where tolerance was central and everyone was welcome. This unique atmosphere was largely created by Peeters herself, allowing regulars to share their joys and sorrows while also attracting members of the cultural elite. The café’s distinctive character earned it international recognition, including a nomination by The Guardian as one of the world’s best bars.

In 2024, Peeters chose not to renew the brewery contract, and the café closed at the end of the year. Shortly before, the property had been sold to Horeca Logistics Services (HLS), owned by the Haelterman family. Following the closure, the Brussels government initiated procedures to protect the café as a monument, citing its significance within Brussels’ café culture. The interior, executed in Art Deco style with scarce wartime materials such as plywood and imitation leather, was considered of particular heritage value. Despite a negative recommendation from the Royal Commission for Monuments and Landscapes, the building was officially recognised as a protected monument on 22 February 2024. This measure formed part of a wider effort to safeguard remarkable café interiors in Brussels, alongside establishments such as Taverne Espérance, L'Archiduc, Café Métropole, Le Cirio, La Ruche, Brasserie Verschueren, and Le Falstaff.

On 30 April 2025, the café reopened under new ownership with the name Au Derby. As the protected name Au Daringman could not be retained at the time of the 2024 takeover, the new operators chose Au Derby, a reference to the Zwanze Derby between RWDM Brussels and Royale Union Saint-Gilloise.

== Architecture ==
=== Exterior ===
The building is located on the corner of Rue de Flandre and Rue du Chien Marin/Zeehondstraat in central Brussels. It consists of four storeys, with one bay on the Rue de Flandre façade and four bays along the Rue du Chien Marin, under a flat roof, constructed in a common Art Deco style. The ground floor houses a café with central access on the Rue de Flandre side. The façade is made of red brick with a bluestone plinth, horizontal simulated stone lintels, and curved pilasters framing some windows. Ground-floor bays feature ochre tiles and a concrete canopy, while doors and windows are painted red.

=== Interior ===
The ground floor has a rectangular plan with the main café space, a kitchen to the left, and access to sanitary facilities and the stairwell to the right. The interior is designed in a popularised Art Deco style, described by Cappuyns as “cheap deco,” which imitates the rich veneers of traditional Art Deco using plywood panels, geometric patterns, and rounded forms to create a contemporary appearance. This design extends to the wainscoting, bar, and simple furniture, reflecting material scarcity of wood and leather during and after World War II.

The café features a central support beam, fixed side benches, and a bar, decorated with geometric motifs and red Formica accents. Walls and ceilings are cream-coloured, and the floor is tiled in ochre and brown. Behind the bar, shelving and a mirrored wall display glasses and beverages, while portraits of American jazz legends and plants on the window sill add decorative detail. The interior shows signs of wear, including damaged wainscoting and benches, and disrupted floor patterns.
