= Le Cirio =

Historic café in Brussels, Belgium

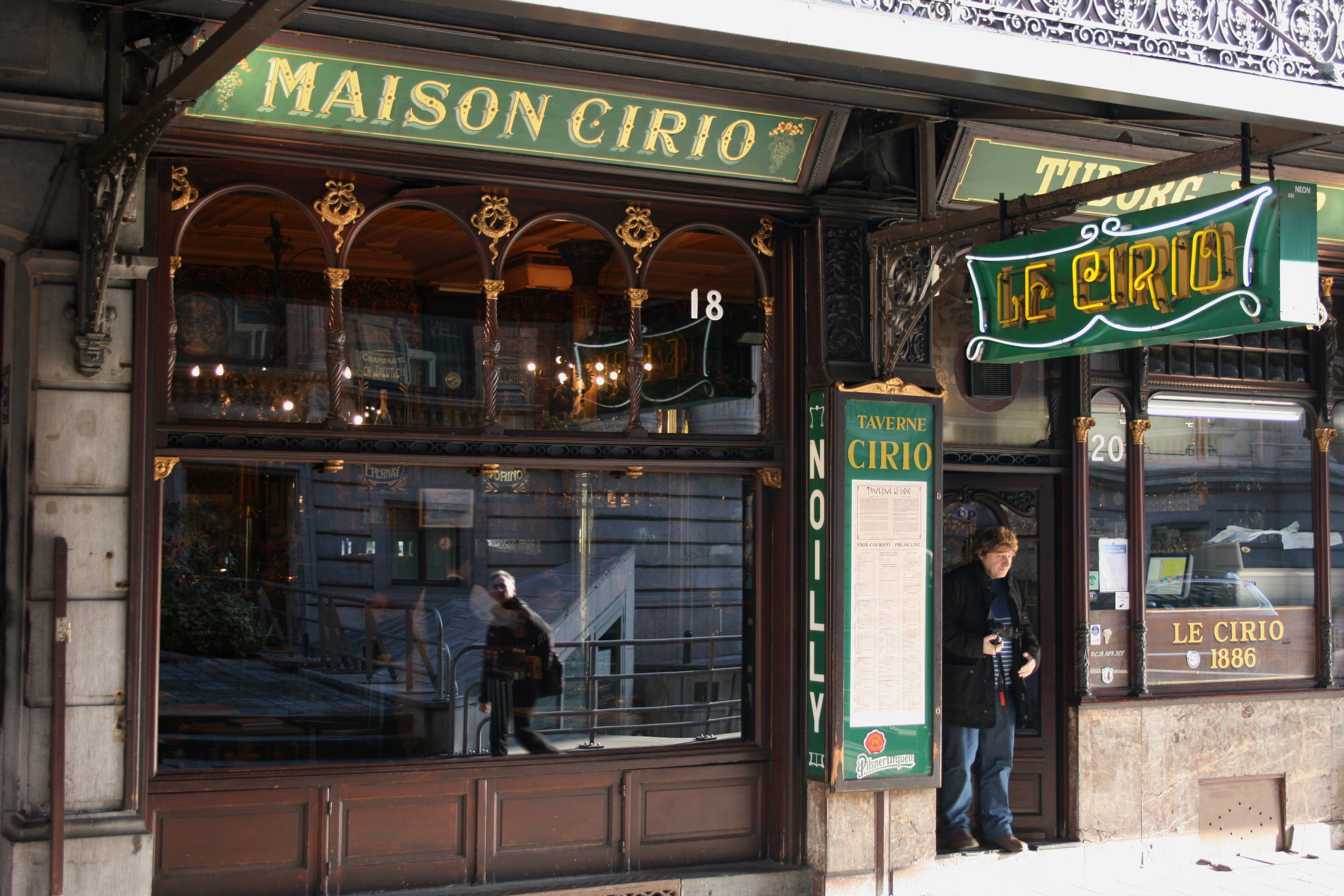
- Le Cirio seen from Rue de la Bourse/Beursstraat

General information
- Type: Café
- Architectural style: Eclectic
- Location: Rue de la Bourse/Beursstraat 18, 1000 City of Brussels, Brussels-Capital Region, Belgium
- Coordinates: 50°51′0″N 4°21′0″E
- Construction started: 1883
- Completed: 1886
- Renovated: 1909; 1919; 1923; 1953; 1979; 1980; 2018
- Client: S.A. Les Constructions Réunis

Design and construction
- Architect: Charles Gys
- Designations: Protected (03/03/2012)

Renovating team
- Architects: Henri Coosemans; René Serrure; Architectures Parallèles

Other information
- Public transit: 4 [[|0]] Bourse - Grand-Place/Beurs - Grote Markt

Website
- lecirio.be

Le Cirio is a historic café in Brussels, established in 1886 and located on Rue de la Bourse/Beursstraat. The café features a highly decorated Belle Époque interior and a distinctive façade that has been preserved over the years. Since 2011, both the building and its frontage have been protected as heritage.

== History ==
The buildings that house Le Cirio were constructed between 1883 and 1886 by architect Charles Gys for the company S.A. Les Constructions Réunis. Originally designed as ten contiguous rental houses in an eclectic style with neoclassical influences, the ensemble included commercial spaces on the ground floor.

Le Cirio opened in 1886 at numbers 18–20 as part of a branch of the Maison Cirio, founded by Italian entrepreneur Francesco Cirio. A tasting salon accompanied the retail space, and by 1885 the Almanac of Commerce listed Cirio's establishment at number 20, with operations extending across numbers 18–20 from 1887. Decorative elements, such as portraits, medal collections, and a 1894 permit letter for opening a tasting salon, still bear witness to this early use.

In 1909, the café façade was redesigned in Neo-Renaissance style by decorateur Henri Coosemans, featuring a marble base, dark gilded woodwork, caryatids, grotesques, and arcades on slender bronze columns with Ionic capitals. The café interior largely dates from this period, although the counter bears the year 1886.

The third hall underwent its first modification in 1919 by architect René Serrure, followed by an expansion in 1923, which later served as the reference for restorations. In 1953, the original glass canopy was replaced with a reinforced simplified structure. Interior and exterior works were carried out in 1979, and the third hall was subdivided in 1980 to accommodate a kitchen.

Around the 1940s, the café became known for serving ‘half-en-half’, a mixture of half sparkling wine and half white wine. The drink originated in the cafés around the Bourse as a cheaper alternative for those who had lost money at the stock exchange, while winners celebrated with champagne. Le Cirio remains popular for this traditional beverage.

Technical studies for a comprehensive restoration began in 2015, commissioned by the owner in collaboration with urban.brussels and financially supported by the Brussels-Capital Region. A large-scale restoration was completed in 2018 under Architectures Parallèles, returning the interior largely to its 1923 configuration. Works included replacing linoleum with solid oak parquet, restoring fixed furniture, ceilings, and wall finishes, reinstating the rear room with its glass canopy, and conserving original sanitary facilities. The café's canopy, shared by Rue de la Bourse numbers 4–40, was reconstructed using archival materials and preserved elements.

== Architecture ==
=== Exterior ===
Le Cirio, at Rue de la Bourse numbers 18–20, features a Neo-Renaissance façade with a marble base and dark gilded woodwork. Decorative elements include caryatids, grotesques, and arcades on slender bronze columns with Ionic capitals, distinguishing it from the surrounding neoclassical façades. The glass canopy, shared by Rue de la Bourse numbers 4–40, includes decorative metal supports and cathedral glass.

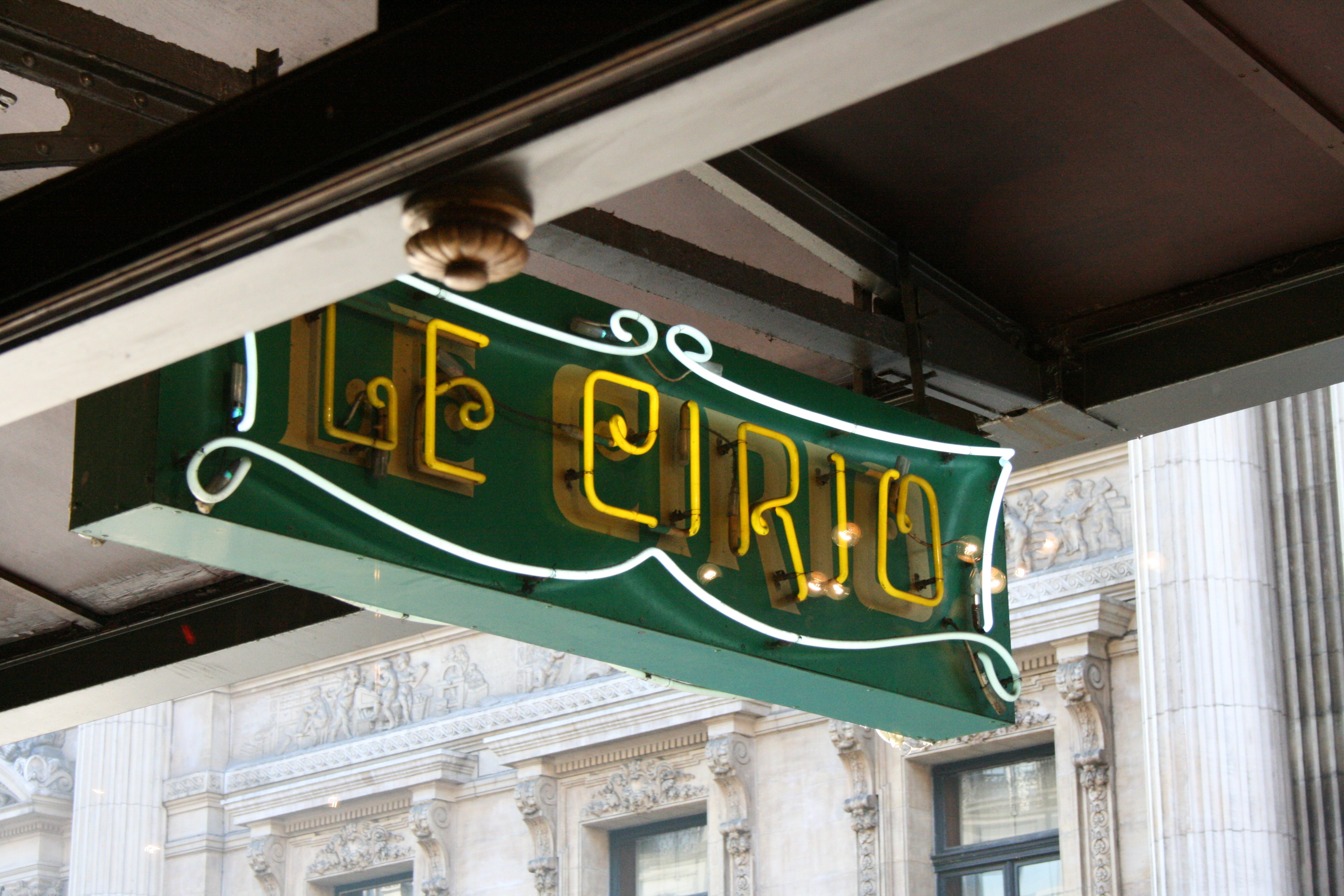
Sign

=== Interior ===
The café interior consists of three successive halls reflecting Belle Époque style. Floors are restored in solid oak parquet in English style, while walls, ceilings, and fixed furniture were conserved. Fragments of Japanese Kinkarakawakami wallpaper were reinstated. Copper details, bevelled mirrors, glass displays behind the bar, and showcases with various objects contribute to the café’s historic atmosphere. The rear room, with its glass canopy, has been returned to its 1923 configuration, and original sanitary facilities have been preserved.

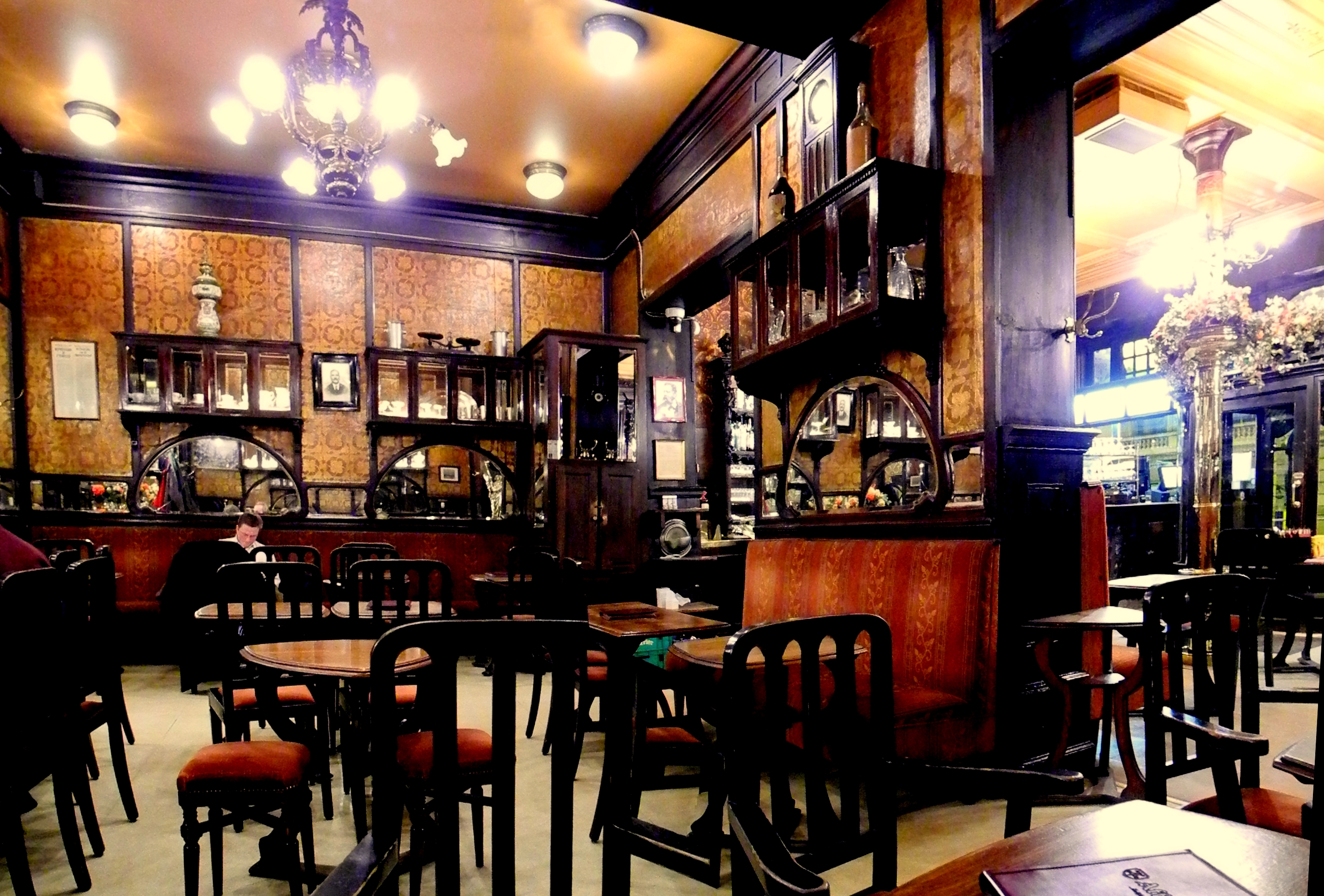
Interior

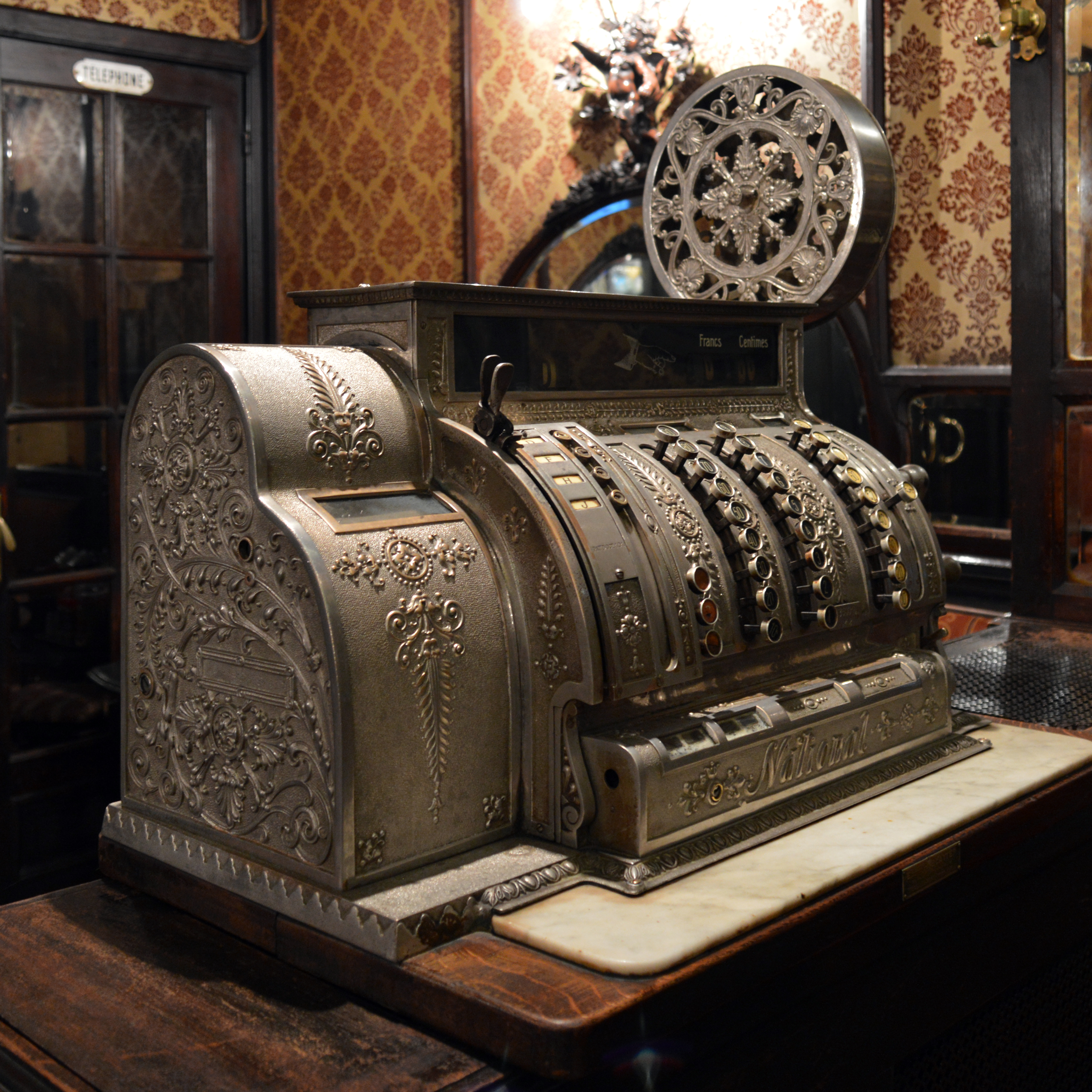
Historic cash register

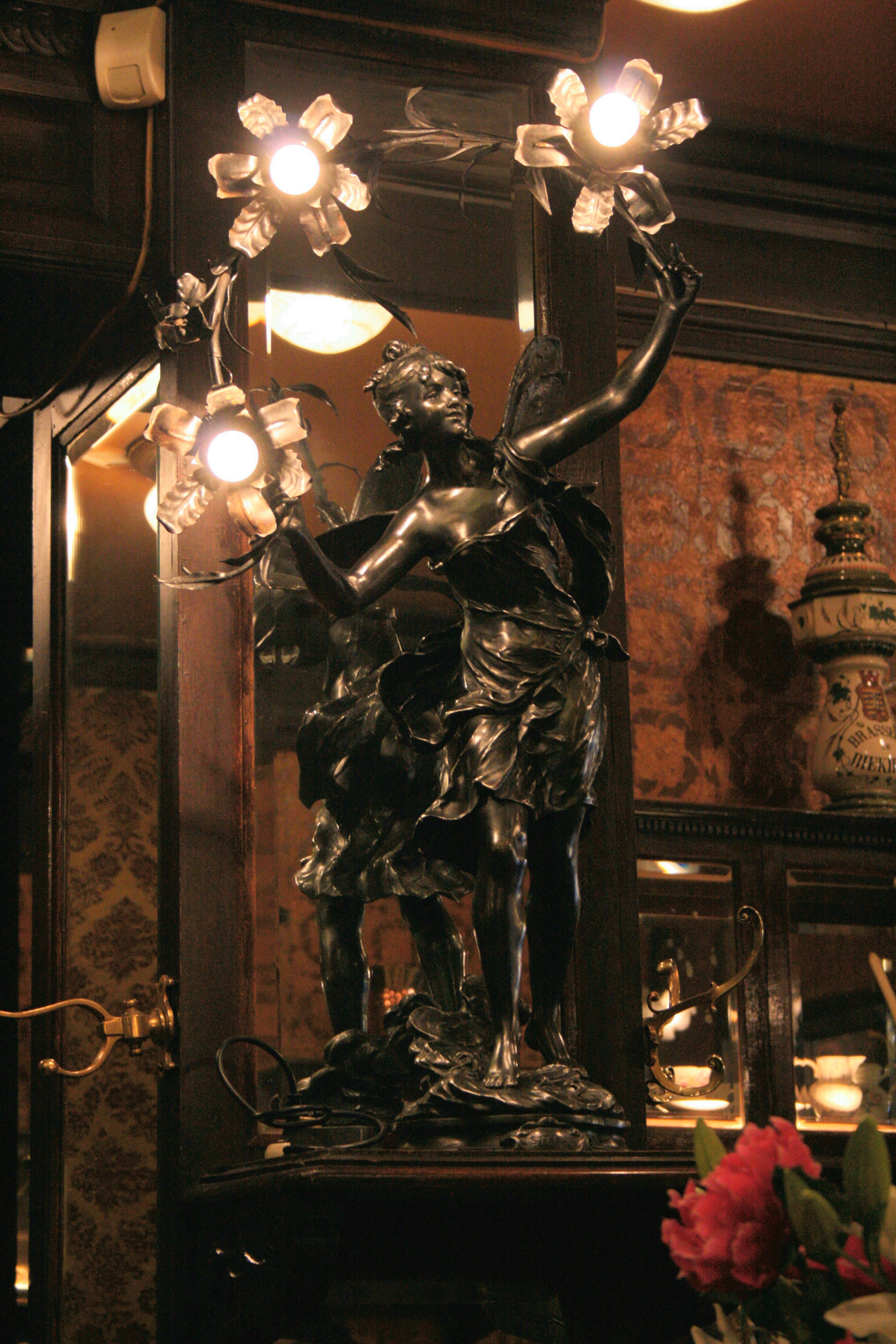
Light fixture
