= À La Becasse =

Historic lambic café in Brussels, Belgium

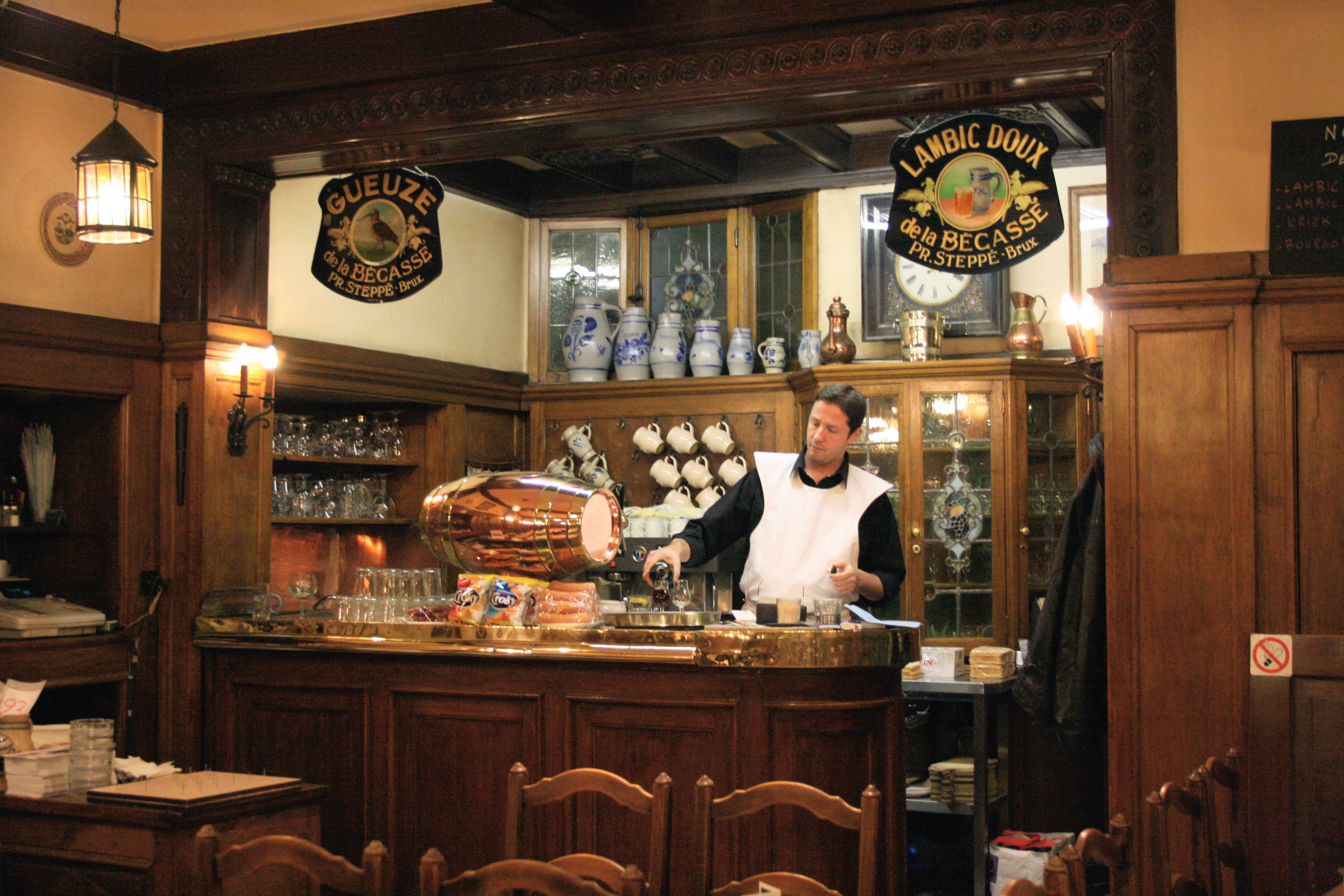
- Interior of À La Becasse

General information
- Type: Café
- Architectural style: Eclectic
- Location: Rue de Tabora / Taborastraat 9–11, 1000 City of Brussels, Brussels-Capital Region, Belgium
- Coordinates: 50°50′53″N 4°21′5″E
- Inaugurated: 22 June 1877; 149 years ago
- Renovated: 1892, 1929

Renovating team
- Architect: Léon Janlet

Other information
- Public transit: 4 [[|0]] Bourse - Grand-Place/Beurs - Grote Markt

Website
- alabecasse.com

À La Becasse (French, pronounced [a la bəkasə], lit. 'At The Woodcock') is a historic lambic café located at 9–11, rue de Tabora/Taborastraat in central Brussels, Belgium. Established in 1877 by Henri Steppé, the establishment is notable for its long-standing association with lambic beer culture and for having remained in the ownership of the Steppé family for more than a century.

== History ==
The site of À La Becasse has a history predating the café itself. Originally, it functioned as a coaching inn for carriages travelling from Halle, Leuven, or Tienen. At that time, the façade opened directly onto the square of the Church of St. Nicholas. As Brussels developed, the square was reduced, and the street's name evolved: first as an extension of the Rue au Beurre/Boterstraat, later renamed Rue de Tabora/Taborastraat in 1916 after the Belgian victory at the Battle of Tabora in present-day Tanzania.

On 22 June 1877, Henri Steppé acquired the business of the tavern L'Estaminet at 9–11, rue au Beurre for 15,000 Belgian francs. He is thought to have renamed it À La Becasse, the name that endures today. Five years later, in 1882, his son François Prosper "Prosper" Steppé was born in a corner of the café's first floor.

The current building dates from 1892, replacing the earlier structure where Henri Steppé had established the café. In 1929, the architect Léon Janlet carried out a restoration of the rear section, redesigning the interior and adding a stepped gable that commemorated the years 1877–1977.

Under François Prosper Steppé, À La Becasse also became linked to a beer blending operation, established independently from the café. In 1952, this blending business was acquired by Belle-Vue, and the Bécasse brand later passed to Brabrux and Interbrew. Since 1993, the café has been supplied by Timmermans Brewery, which produces a draught Lambic Doux faro exclusively for the establishment.

The Steppé family has retained ownership of the café itself, which is still operated by the third generation. Centenary celebrations were held in 1977, followed by the 130th anniversary in 2007. On 19 August 2024, the building was officially registered in the legal heritage inventory.

== Architecture ==
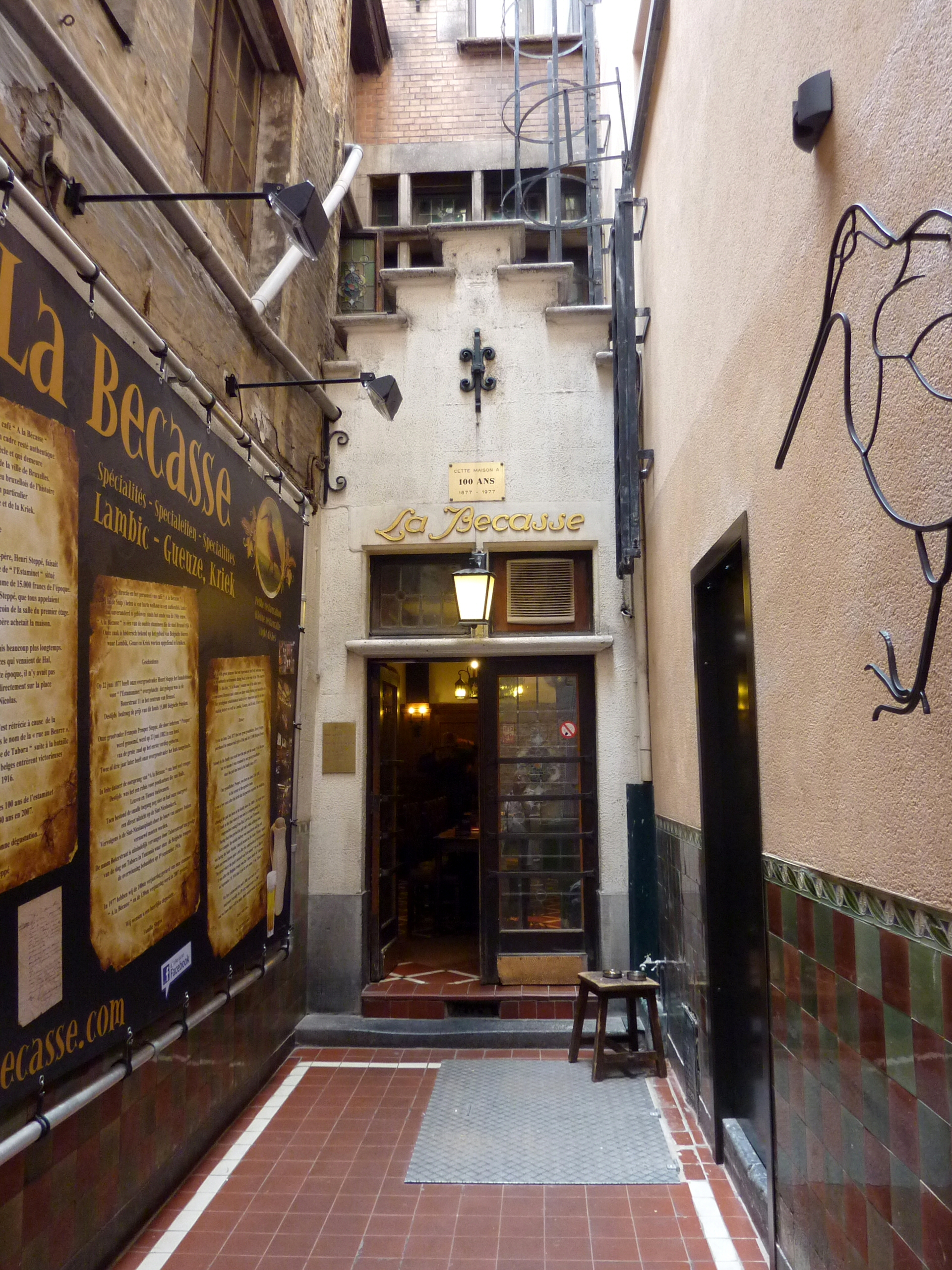
Entrance

The building is an eclectic-style town house constructed in 1892. It consists of five storeys and one bay under a gabled roof. The cement-rendered façade is marked with faux-jointing, string courses, and continuous window frames. A wooden oriel window with panels and a cornice interrupted by a pediment dominates the upper levels, while the top floor features a wide arched glass door with French balcony and a matching two-light window framed by pilaster strips.

The ground and mezzanine floors were later adapted for commercial use. The rear section of the property provides access to the café, which retains an older core structure with a brick and stone gabled façade. This part was restored in 1929 by the architect Léon Janlet, including the addition of a stepped gable inscribed with the years 1877–1977 and a redesigned interior.

== See also ==
- History of Brussels
- Culture of Belgium
- Belgium in the long nineteenth century
