= Cirio =

Italian food company

Cirio S.p.A.
- Type: Subsidiary (S.p.A.)
- Industry: Italian food
- Founded: 1856 (170 years ago) in Turin, Kingdom of Sardinia
- Founder: Francesco Cirio
- Headquarters: San Lazzaro di Savena, Bologna, Italy
- Area served: Worldwide
- Parent: Conserve Italia
- Website: www.cirio1856.com

Cirio S.p.A. (Italian pronunciation: [ˈtʃiːrjo]) is an Italian food company, founded in 1856 in Turin.

The company sponsored SSC Napoli in 1982–83 and 1984–85 season and SS Lazio from 1996 to 2000.

== History ==
=== Founding and early success (1856–1867) ===
Cirio was established in 1856 by Francesco Cirio, who revolutionized food preservation with the technique of "appertization," which extended the shelf life of perishable products. This innovation allowed Cirio to export fruit and vegetables globally. The company's first factory opened in Turin, and by 1867, Cirio was showcasing its products at the Exposition Universelle in Paris, where he received prestigious awards. After this, he began exporting all over the world from Liverpool to Sidney.

=== Expansion and legacy (1868–1900) ===
Following Italy's unification, Cirio expanded into southern Italy, revitalizing abandoned agricultural lands and establishing new production facilities. By the end of the 19th century, Cirio had grown into one of Italy's largest food companies, known for its canned vegetables, fruit, and tomato products.

=== Growth and diversification (1901–1970) ===
The early 20th century saw Cirio's influence expand under Pietro Signorini, who succeeded Francesco Cirio and continued to build on his legacy. Signorini's efforts solidified Cirio's reputation as a leading food brand. The company was known for its wide range of products, including canned vegetables, meats, and pasta. In 1970, Cirio was sold to SME, and by 1993, it had been privatized.

=== Modern era and Conserve Italia (2004–present) ===
In 2004, Cirio became part of the Conserve Italia Group, a major European agri-food cooperative. Conserve Italia, Cirio's parent company, is a major player in the European food industry, encompassing over 14,500 farmers and processing more than 650,000 tonnes of produce annually.

== Products ==
Cirio offers a wide range of food products across several categories.

Tomatoes	Vegetables	Ready meals	Jams and marmelade
Sieved tomatoes	Cannellini beans	Pasta Sauce	Extra Jam Apricot
Peeled plum tomatoes	Lentils	Pizza sauce	Extra Jam Blueberry
Chopped tomatoes	Chick peas	Chili Veggie	Extra Jam Strawberry
Tuscan Range	Borlotti beans	Burritos	Extra Jam Wild Berries
Rustica sieved tomatoes	Butter beans	Baked beans	Extra Jam Peach
Tomato puree	Red Kidney	Legumes and Cereals	Extra Jam Black Cherry
Datterino tomato	Green peas		Extra Jam Cherry
Fillets tomato	Green beans		Extra Jam Plum
Cherry tomatoes	Sweet corn		Marmalade Orange
	Gran mix		

== See also ==
- List of Italian companies
- Italian cuisine
