= Citroën Garage =

Former garage and showroom in Brussels, Belgium

Coordinates: 50.8596°N 4.3487°E

- Garage Citroën (French); Citroëngarage (Dutch)
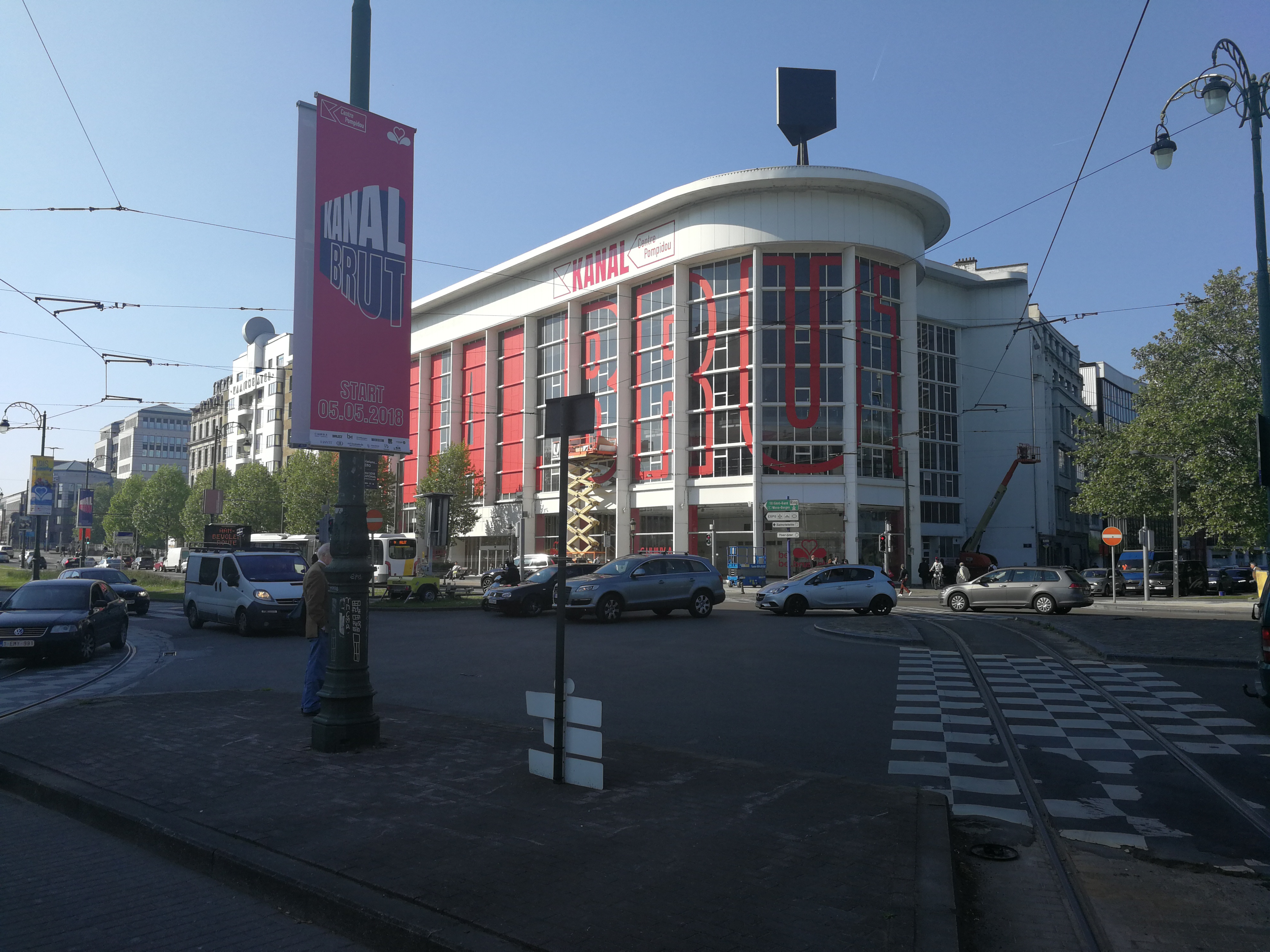

General information
- Architectural style: Modernism
- Location: Northern Quarter, Square Sainctelette / Sainctelettesquare 21, 1000 City of Brussels, Brussels-Capital Region, Belgium
- Current tenants: KANAL – Centre Pompidou
- Groundbreaking: 10 October 1933
- Completed: 1934
- Owner: Brussels-Capital Region

Design and construction
- Architects: Maurice-Jacques Ravazé; Alexis Dumont; Marcel Van Goethem

Renovating team
- Architects: Louis Hoebeke (1954); Atelier Kanal Architects (2020–present)

Other information
- Public transit: 2 6 Yser/IJzer

The Citroën Garage (French: Garage Citroën; Dutch: Citroëngarage), originally a garage and showroom, is located on the Place de l'Yser/IJzerplein in Brussels, Belgium. It served as Citroën Belux's headquarters until 2012 and continued as a showroom until 2017. The building was designed by Alexis Dumont, Marcel Van Goethem, and Maurice-Jacques Ravazé, and constructed from 1933 to 1934.

== History ==
=== Early history ===
By the late 1920s, the Société Belge des Automobiles Citroën, Citroën Belux's precursor, had its headquarters on the Rue de l'Amazone/Amazonestraat in Ixelles. Seeking to consolidate its operations, Citroën decided to move. Maurice Ravazé selected a site at the northern corner of the Pentagon (Brussels' city centre), near the Brussels–Scheldt Maritime Canal, and close to key train stations. This location previously housed a short-lived amusement park with attractions like roller coasters and a theater.

==== Design and construction ====
The architects Dumont and Van Goethem created a modernist complex using glass, steel, and concrete, featuring an innovative night-lighting concept for the showroom. The design adapted to existing structures, leading to a unique layout. The main showroom was located at the corner of the Square Sainctelette/Sainctelettesquare and the Place de l'Yser/IJzerplein, with additional buildings for displaying the latest models and housing offices. Workshops occupied the northern two-thirds of the block, with organized circulation for clients, employees, and suppliers.

Construction began on 20 October 1933, and finished in the spring of 1934. The project received enthusiastic support from the Brussels City Council, who believed it would revitalize the area and boost the local economy.

=== Wartime and post-war ===
During World War II, the garage was occupied and bombed by the Germans, and later served as a garage for Allied combat vehicles. After the war, temporary facilities were used until repairs allowed the garage to reopen in 1947.

=== Mid-20th century ===
In preparation for the 1958 Brussels World's Fair (Expo 58), the architect Louis Hoebeke added a gas station and exhibition platform to the showroom. By 1958, four additional levels were constructed, and a building adjacent to the showroom was replaced to facilitate access to these new levels. Renovations continued through the 1960s and 1970s, including the addition of uniform white facades around 1980.

=== Transformation into museum ===
In 2015, the Brussels Urban Development Corporation purchased the complex to convert it into a contemporary art museum as part of a canal zone revitalization project. In 2017, a call for design proposals resulted in 92 submissions. The winning design, developed into KANAL – Centre Pompidou, emerged from a collaboration between the Brussels Region, Paris' Centre Pompidou, and CIVA.

== See also ==
- History of Brussels
- Culture of Belgium
