= Le Cheval Marin =

Café and dormer port house in Brussels, Belgium

Le Cheval Marin (French); Het Zeepaard (Dutch)
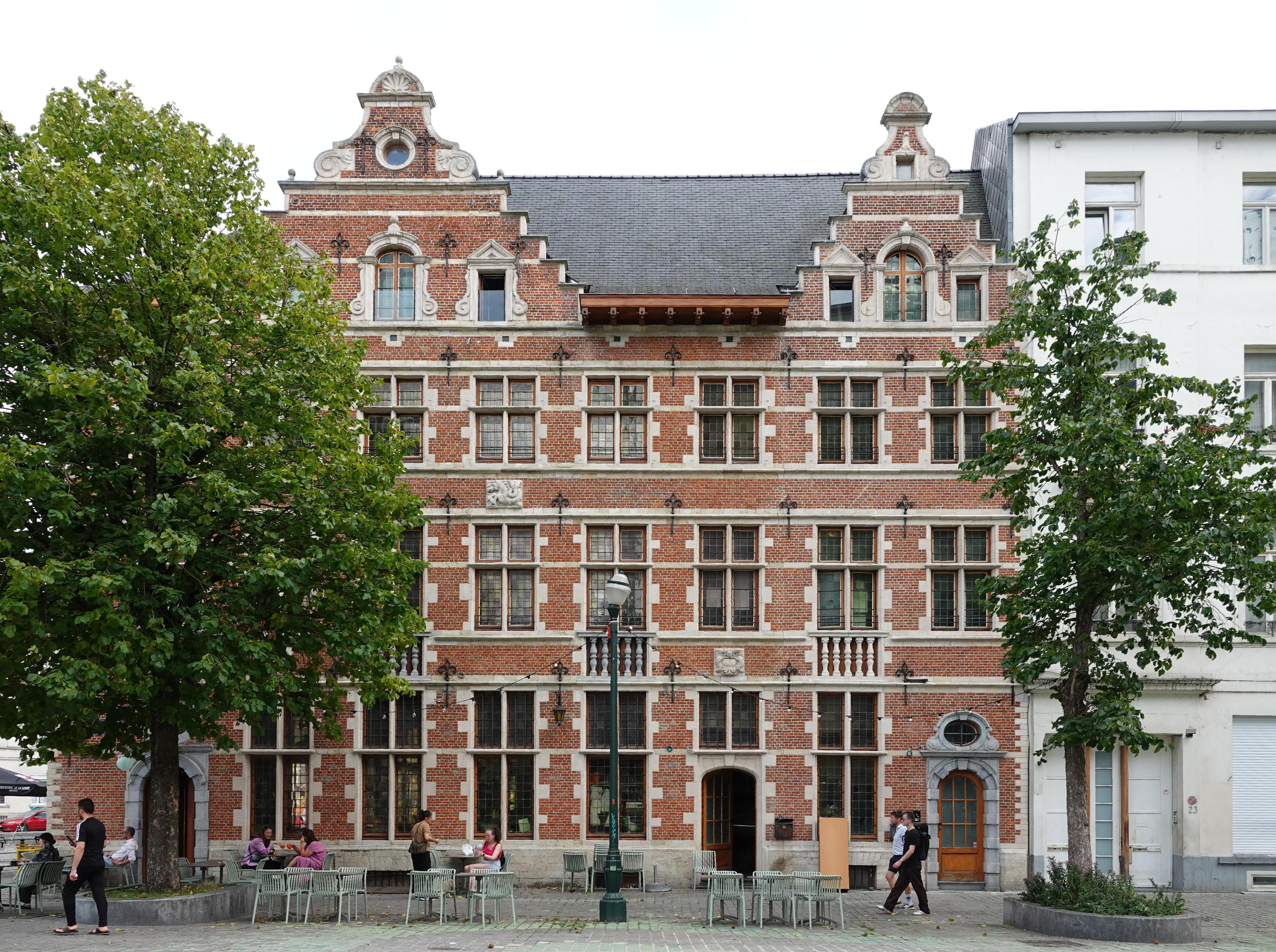
- Le Cheval Marin seen from the Marché aux Porcs/Varkensmarkt
- Interactive map of the: Le Cheval Marin (French); Het Zeepaard (Dutch); area

General information
- Type: Café
- Architectural style: Neo-Baroque
- Location: Quai aux Briques/Baksteenkaai 90, 1000 City of Brussels, Brussels-Capital Region, Belgium
- Coordinates: 50°51′12.32″N 4°20′47.13″E
- Inaugurated: 1680
- Renovated: 1898–1899; 1918–1919; 2016–2018

Design and construction
- Architect: Unknown
- Designations: Protected (20/11/2003)

Renovating team
- Architects: Hubert Marcq; A. Lagache; Arter

Other information
- Public transit: 1 5 Sainte-Catherine/Sint-Katelijne

Website
- lechevalmarin.com

Le Cheval Marin (French) or Het Zeepaard (Dutch) (transl. The Seahorse) is a monumental corner building in Brussels, located at Rue du Marché aux Porcs/Varkensmarkt 25 and Quai aux Briques/Baksteenkaai 90. Originally dated by cartouches to 1680, it is a prominent example of traditional brick-and-sandstone architecture with Baroque elements. Until the late 19th century, it was regarded as the most striking building in the city's former harbour district.

== History ==
Le Cheval Marin was originally built in 1680 in the heart of the inner harbour. From the 18th century onwards, it became a prosperous inn where tickets for regular boat services to Mechelen and Antwerp were sold at the counter.

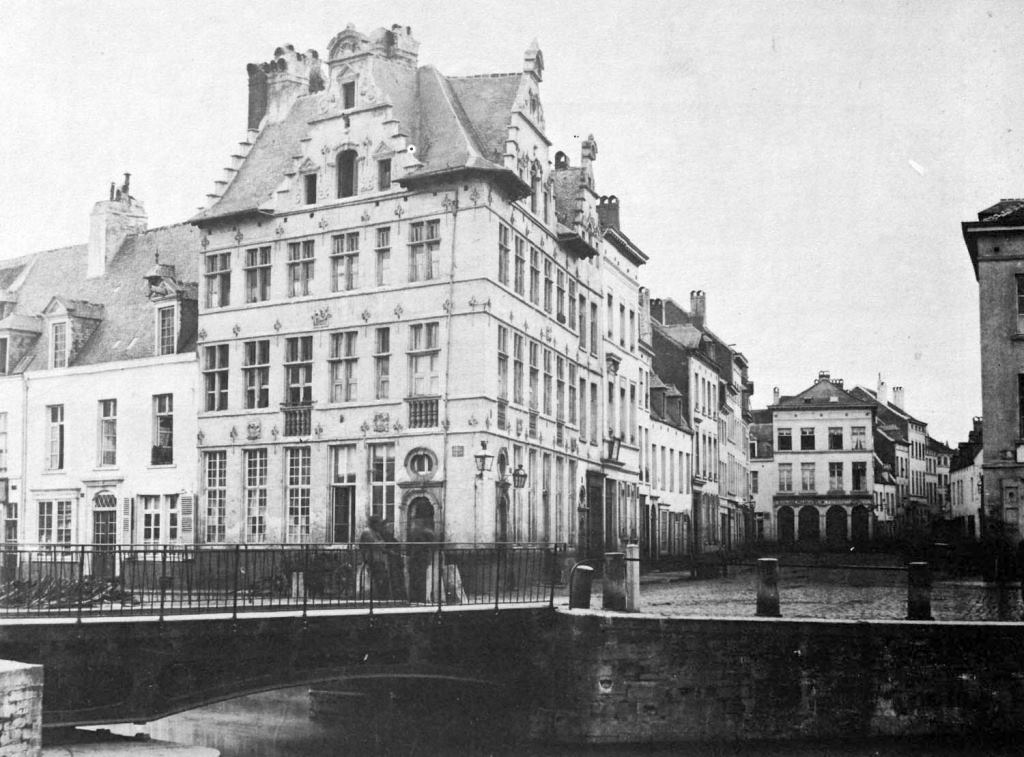
Le Cheval Marin, viewed from Rue du Marché aux Porcs/Varkensmarkt in 1865, before its reconstruction in 1898–1899.

Le Cheval Marin remained until the end of the 19th century the only nearly intact example of traditional brick and sandstone architecture mixed with Baroque elements, and was regarded as one of the most remarkable buildings of the old harbour district. It was built in the Flemish Renaissance style and once considered one of the jewels of architecture in the Low Countries. 1893, the City of Brussels acquired the property at the request of Mayor Charles Buls, with the intention of preserving it, although two bays on the right-hand side along the Rue du Marché aux Porcs had previously been separated and were not included in the purchase.

The building was carefully surveyed in 1897 and subsequently sold at public auction in 1898, with the obligation to reconstruct it. Between 1898 and 1899, it was completely demolished and rebuilt under the supervision of architect Hubert Marcq. The reconstruction used contemporary materials, including Boom brick, Euville stone, Gobertange stone and bluestone, and introduced a slightly elevated plinth.

The two right-hand bays, originally part of the building but remodelled in 1853, were also demolished and reconstructed between 1917 and 1918 under architect A. Lagache. These projects reflected an evolving philosophy of restoration, experimenting respectively with free reconstruction, consolidation with maximum preservation of original elements, and reconstruction using salvaged bricks and sandstone.

During the 20th century, a restaurant opened in the building. The restaurant became very well known, but went bankrupt in 1999.

After Le Cheval Marin closed, the building fell into disrepair again because the owner neglected it. It became a slum, covered in graffiti and overgrown with weeds. In 2003, the building was listed as a protected monument. Local residents and heritage organisations hoped that this would improve the situation, but in the end, no renovation took place.

The city was unable to do anything about the deterioration because Le Cheval Marin was still privately owned and the building would therefore have to be expropriated. The owner was fined €49,000 per year for leaving the building vacant, but it took until 2013 before he finally applied for a building permit for the renovation, which would include a restaurant downstairs and flats upstairs. A year later, the owner decided to put the building up for sale for €1.1 million.

At the end of 2015, Le Cheval Marin was finally purchased by Cofinimmo, which carried out the building permit. A full restoration was carried out between 2016 and 2018 under the design office Arter, with funding support from the Brussels-Capital Region. The works restored its late 19th-century appearance and adapted the structure for contemporary use as a hospitality venue and two dwellings.

Le Cheval Marin was reopened in 2018 by AB InBev in collaboration with the Brussels-Capital Region's Monuments and Landscapes service and the Café la Pompe team, though the initiative ended early due to the COVID-19 pandemic.

It has since reopened under Café des Minimes, offering Belgian cuisine, house-made croquettes, and an extensive beer selection. The first-floor hall hosts live concerts, DJ sets, and jam sessions, while visitors can enjoy the restored interiors featuring wooden panelling, a central curved bar, marble tables, and mirrors.

== Architecture ==
=== Exterior ===
Le Cheval Marin rises three storeys high and is composed of façades six and eight bays wide, set beneath a steep gabled roof with a stepped end gable to the left. The elevations rest on a plinth and are articulated by quoins and string courses. They are crowned by three raised neck gables: three bays wide at the centre of both façades and two bays wide at the far right. Decorative wrought iron anchors shaped like lilies punctuate the walls.

The windows are arranged in diminishing registers, consisting of cross and mullioned types with chamfered blocks and continuous string courses. On the second floor, some windows are provided with balustrades. Sculpted cartouches display the date “anno 1680” along with a seahorse motif.

A corner entrance is framed by a round-arched doorway in rusticated stonework, decorated with a volute keystone, spandrel panels, and a projecting string course. Above, an oval fanlight is set with a keystone and mouldings; a similar doorway exists in the right-hand bay. The façades are finished with a broad cornice supported by modillions.

The stepped gables are divided into two stages, with five steps and a top element. Each is furnished with a Baroque three-part window composition: a central round-arched opening flanked by rectangular side lights, framed by volutes, crowned with mouldings, ball ornaments, and triangular pediments. The upper section contains a rectangular hatch or oculus, volutes, and a curved pediment with a shell motif.
