= Square Sainctelette =

Square in Brussels, Belgium

Square Sainctelette (French); Sainctelettesquare (Dutch)
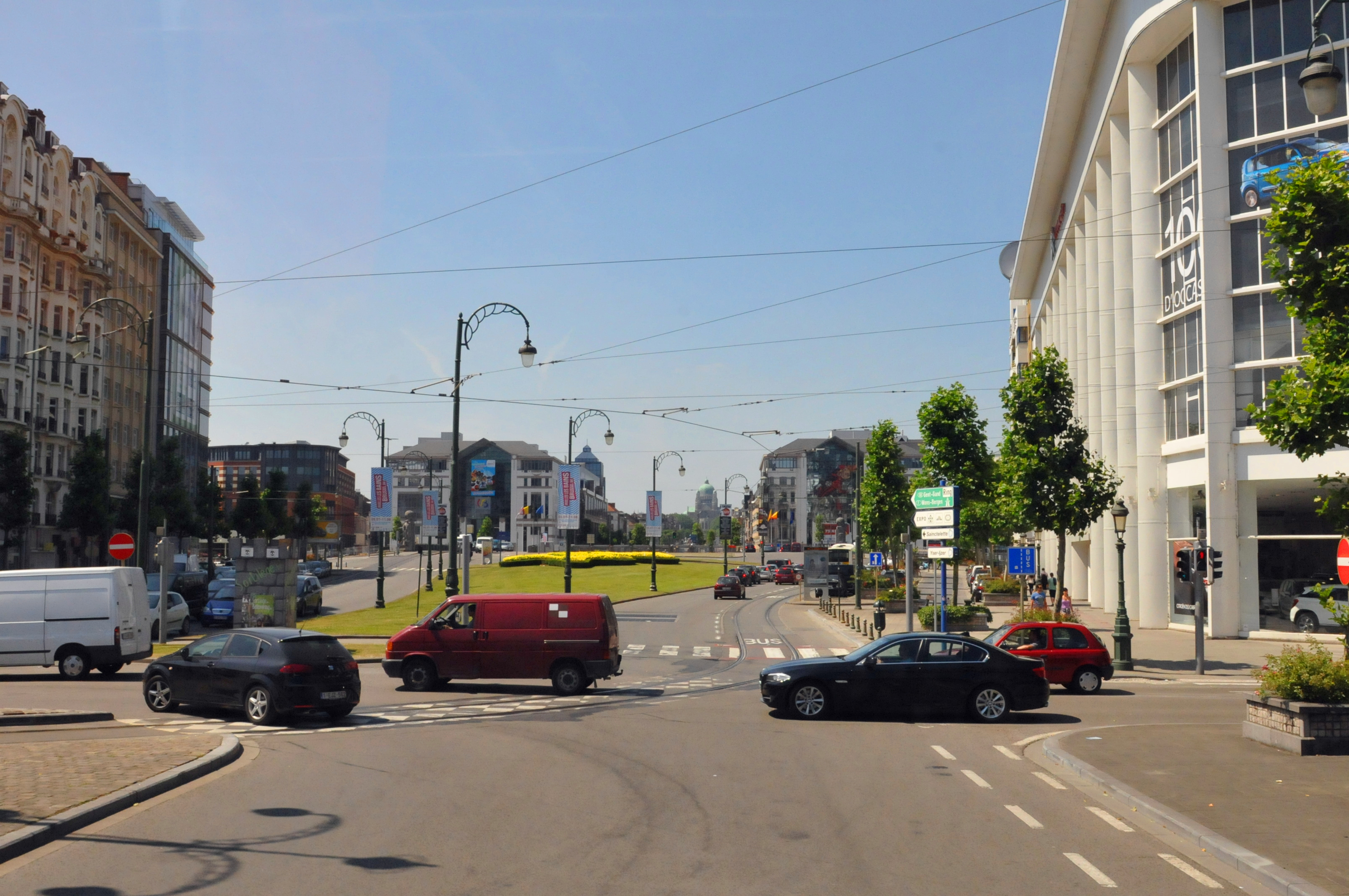
- Looking west towards the Basilica of the Sacred Heart in the background

- Location within Brussels Location within Belgium
- Namesake: Charles-Xavier Sainctelette
- Type: Square
- Location: City of Brussels, Brussels-Capital Region, Belgium
- Quarter: Quays or Sainte-Catherine/Sint-Katelijne Quarter
- Postal code: 1000
- Nearest metro station: 2 6 Yser/IJzer
- Coordinates: 50°51′31″N 04°20′49″E

Construction
- Completion: 1911

The Square Sainctelette (French, pronounced [skwaʁ sɛ̃t.lɛt]) or Sainctelettesquare (Dutch, pronounced [ˈsɛɪŋktəlɛt(ə)ˌskwɛːr]) is a square in the City of Brussels municipality of Brussels, Belgium. It is named in honour of Charles-Xavier Sainctelette, a former Belgian Minister of Public Works.

The square lies along the Brussels–Charleroi Canal, in the north-western corner of Brussels' city centre, on the border with the Molenbeek-Saint-Jean municipality, from which it is separated by the canal. A major traffic axis, it is also part of the Small Ring (Brussels' inner ring road). This area is served by Yser/IJzer metro station on lines 2 and 6 of the Brussels Metro.

== History ==
=== Early history ===
The area of the present-day Square Sainctelette originally formed part of the northern edge of Brussels and was located near the Shore Gate (French: Porte du Rivage, Dutch: Oeverpoort), a city gate dating back to at least the 16th century. The gate stood near a bend linking the Brussels–Charleroi Canal to the Willebroek Canal and was guarded by two octroi pavilions (French: pavillons d'octroi) designed in 1833 by the architect Auguste Payen. To the east, near the present-day Place de l'Yser/Ijzerplein, the Leopold Bridge connected the Bassin du Commerce/Handelsdok to the Willebroek Canal.

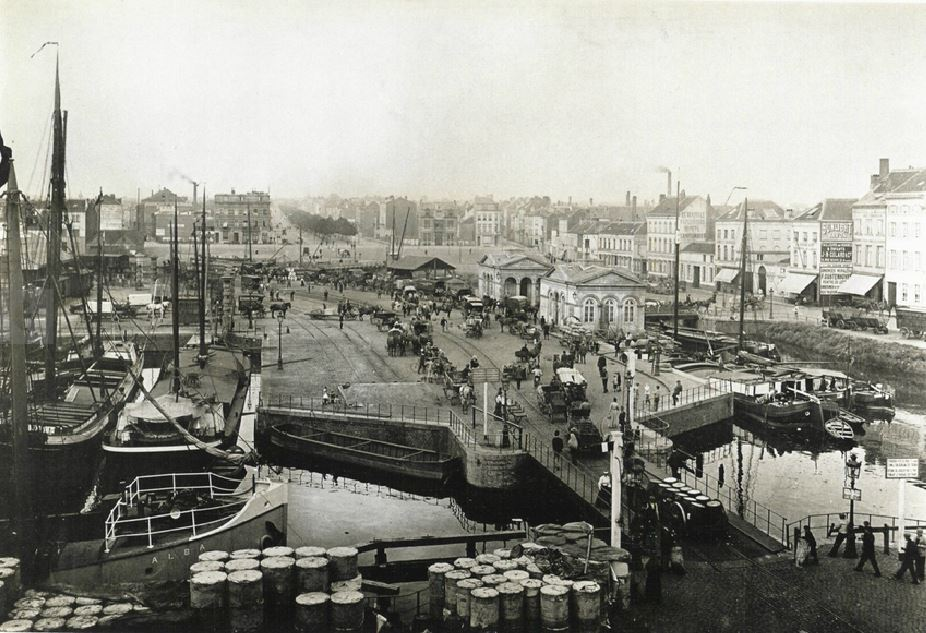
The Shore Gate by Auguste Payen and its surroundings in 1899

During the 19th century, the demolition of the fortifications and the construction of the boulevards of the Small Ring transformed the area into an important transport corridor. The Willebroek Canal was moved westwards so it could meet the Brussels–Charleroi Canal in a straight line, while new harbour docks, such as the Bassin Béco/Becodok and the Bassin Vergote/Vergotedok, were constructed. Disused sections of canal and former docks, including the Bassin du Commerce and the Ferme des Boues/Mestback, were filled in between 1910 and 1911 to make way for a new urban district.

=== Construction ===
The Square Sainctelette itself was laid out in 1911 together with the Quai du Commerce/Handelskaai, the Boulevard de Dixmude/Diksmuidelaan, the Boulevard d'Ypres/Ieperlaan and the Place de l'Yser. The square received its name by decision of the Brussels City Council on 18 October 1912, in honour of the lawyer and politician Charles-Xavier Sainctelette, who served as Belgium's Minister of Public Works.

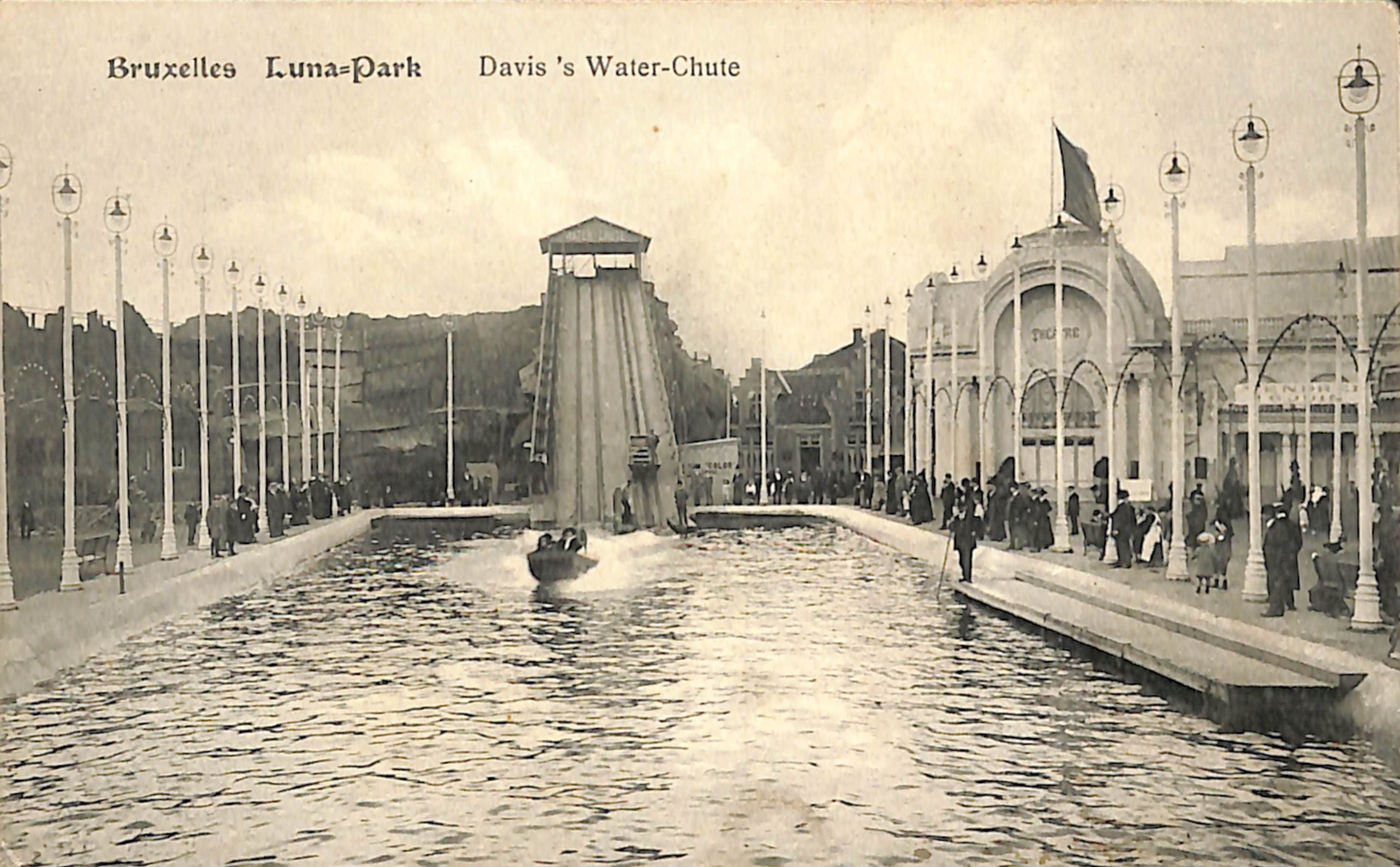
The Davi's Water-Chute in the Luna Park de Bruxelles in 1910

Although the square was created shortly before the First World War, most of the surrounding buildings were constructed only from the 1920s onwards. In 1912, the city leased the block between the Quai des Péniches/Akenkaai and the Quai de Willebroeck/Willebroekkaai to an entrepreneur named Marquet, who opened a luna park there. The complex included a monumental entrance and a large Beaux-Arts-style festival hall designed in 1913, where performances were held by companies such as the Ballets Russes, featuring the Russian dancer Vaslav Nijinsky. The amusement park was closed and occupied by German forces during World War I, and plans to cut a diagonal street through the block were abandoned in 1925.

In 1929, a competition for new canal bridges was won by the architect Victor Rogis, whose design incorporated sculpted stone pillars created by Ernest Wynants. Industrial development also expanded along the canal, and the northern side of the square was gradually built up with notable buildings, including a Beaux-Arts office building completed in 1928 and the former Lunatheater, built in Art Deco and modernist styles. In 1933, the Citroën Garage was built in modernist style, designed by the architects Alexis Dumont and Marcel Van Goethem.

Simultaneously, the branches of the Willebroek Canal were converted into an urban motorway, the first of its kind in Brussels, linking the Pentagon (Brussels' city centre) to the Heysel/Heizel Plateau, which hosted the Brussels International Exposition of 1935. The name Quai de Willebroeck continues to reference the former canal branch along this major traffic route.

=== Later development ===
Originally, the centre of the square was arranged as a triangular garden containing the Monument to the Fallen Engineers, designed by the sculptor Charles Samuel and the architect Joseph Van Neck, and inaugurated in 1928. In 1957, during the redevelopment of the Small Ring in preparation for the 1958 Brussels World's Fair (Expo 58), the monument was moved to the Square Vergote/Vergotesquare when the Viaduct of Koekelberg was built across the square to accommodate increased road traffic.

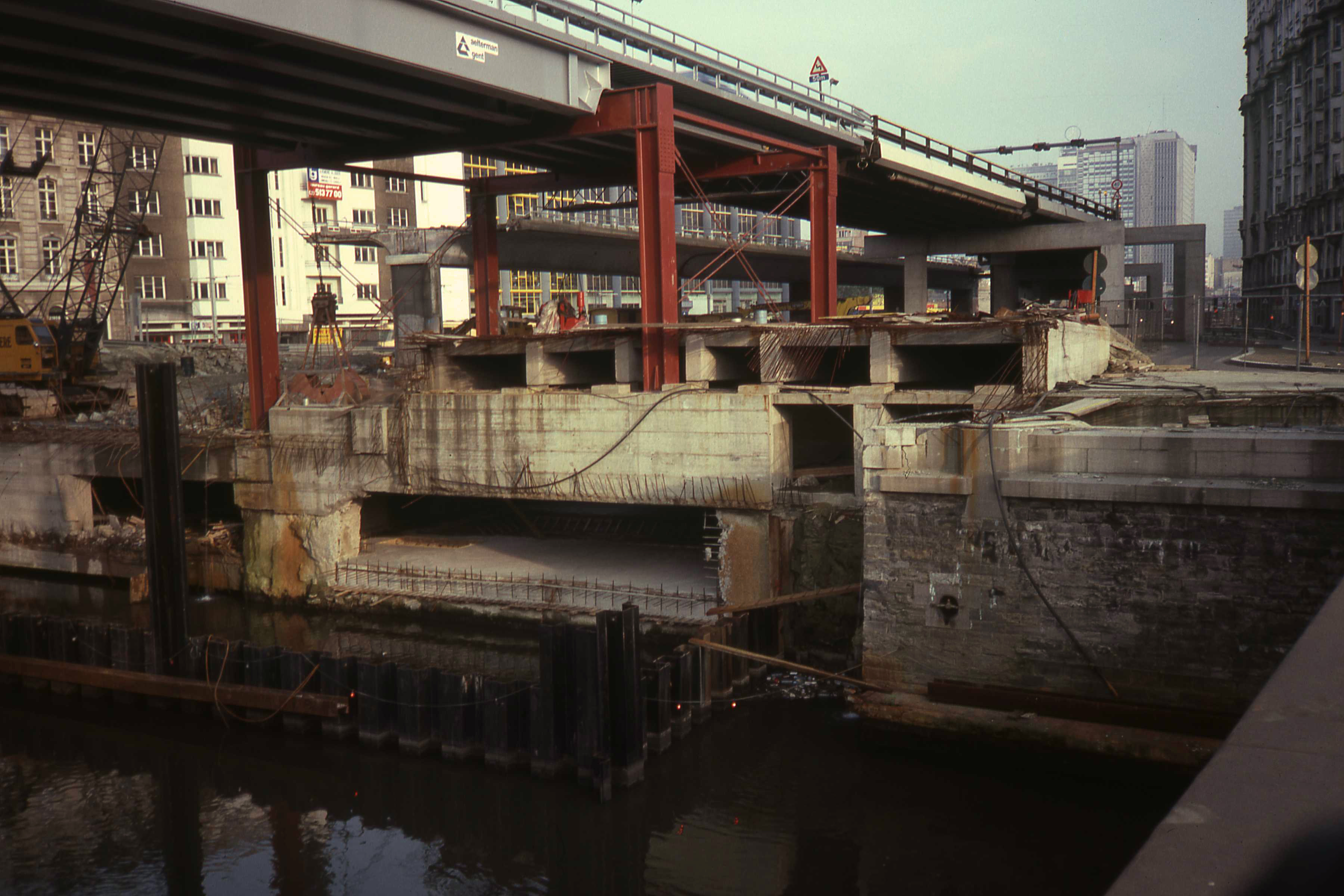
Construction of a road and metro line 2, showing the temporary viaduct and the old viaduct under demolition

Construction of Simonis metro station began in 1978, prompting discussions about an underground road link beneath the Square Sainctelette. Work on the tunnel started in December 1980 and was completed in 1986. The viaduct was demolished in 1984 and replaced by the Leopold II Tunnel. During construction, temporary bridges were used, including replacements for parts of the existing viaduct, and two permanent bridges were ultimately built, higher than the previous ones, incorporating the four statues by Ernest Wynants. The balustrades of these bridges, combining solid blue stone and stainless steel, echo the interwar bridges constructed during the deepening of the Brussels–Charleroi Canal and the expansion of port facilities, with the statues the only historical elements of the bridges remaining.

Beneath the square lies Sainctelette metro station, which has never been opened.

=== 21st century ===
In the 21st century, the surrounding neighbourhood gradually shifted from wholesale trade to a mixture of residential, office and cultural uses. The former Citroën Garage was converted into the KANAL – Centre Pompidou museum of modern and contemporary art, while the nearby Kaaitheater occupies the former Lunatheater building.

In 2019, the square was voted the most dangerous intersection in Brussels in an online poll conducted by the Dutch-language Brussels broadcaster BRUZZ. Plans for a major redesign of the square were finalised the same year, and in 2022, an application was submitted to transform it into a contiguous public space with the Place de l'Yser.

On 16 October 2023, an intersection and building just off the square were the scene of a terrorist attack, in which two Swedish football supporters were killed and a third person injured.

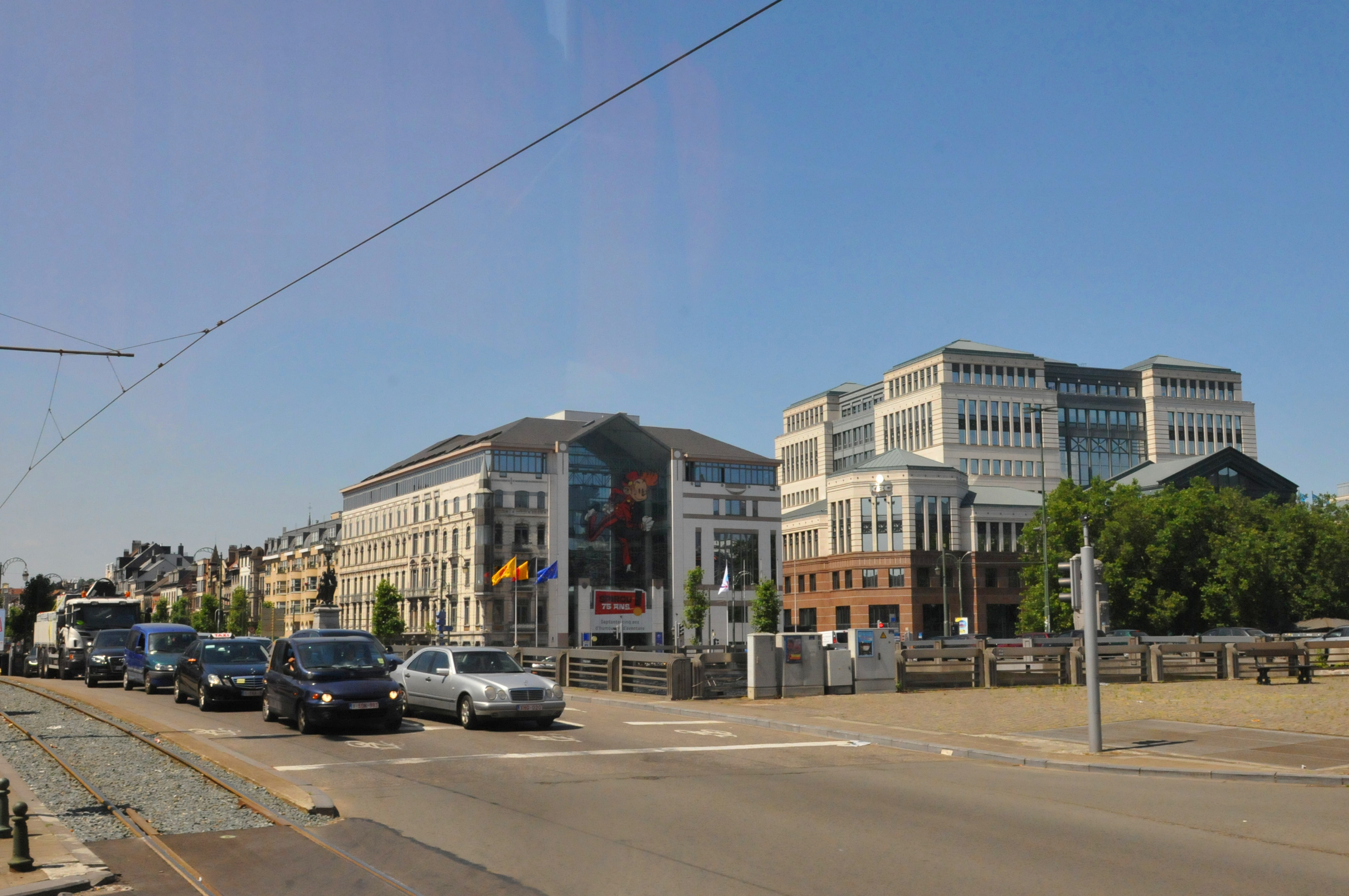
Sainctelette Bridge

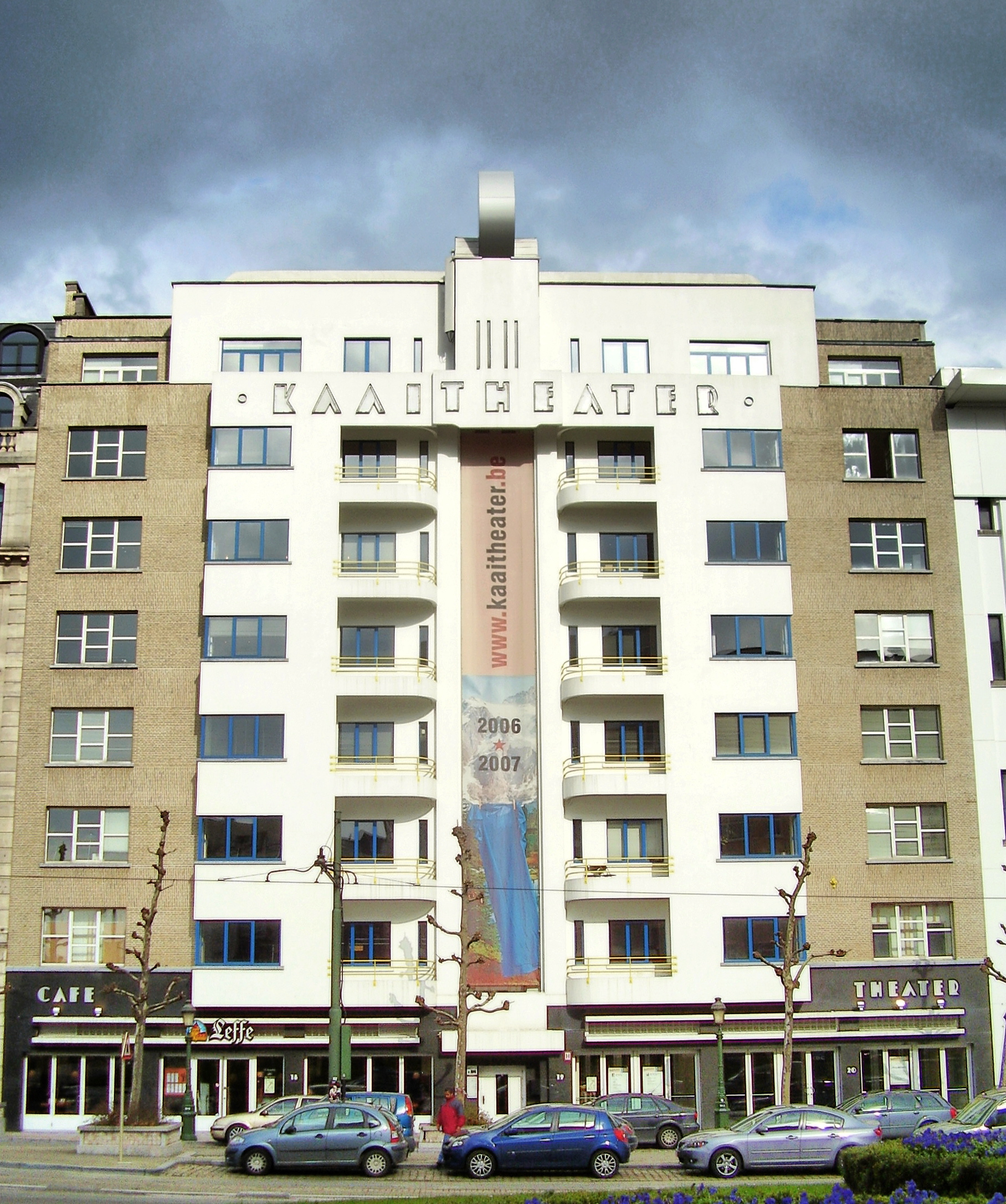
Kaaitheater

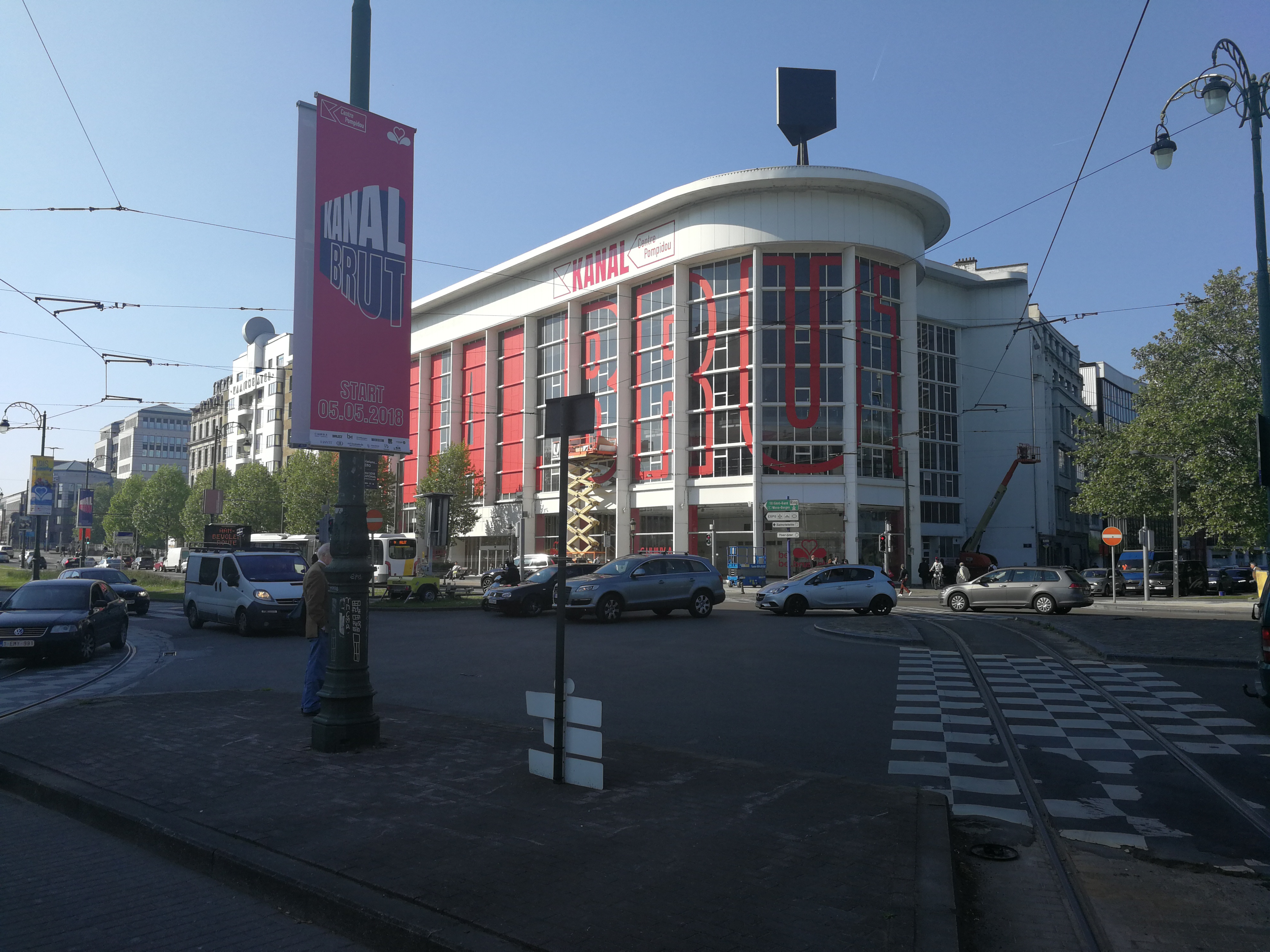
KANAL – Centre Pompidou

== See also ==
- Art Deco in Brussels
- History of Brussels
- Belgium in the long nineteenth century
