= Kasia Redzisz =

Polish art curator

Kasia Redisz is a Polish art historian, curator and museum director. She is the artistic director of Kanal.

== Early life and education ==
Redzisz received an MA in Art History at the University of Warsaw in 2007.

== Career ==
From 2010 to 2015, Redisz worked as an assistant curator at the Tate Modern. In 2014, she became senior curator of Tate Liverpool. She was a curator at Warsaw's Museum of Modern Art from 2005 to 2007, and the director of the Open Arts Project from 2008 to 2015. As an independent curator, she curated the inaugural exhibition Women Looking at Men Looking at Women of Muzeum Susch in 2019. With Mihnea Mircan, she is the co-curator of the 4th Art Encounters Biennial, Timisoara.

In 2023, Redzisz was part of the jury that awarded the 2024 Preis der Nationalgalerie to Pan Daijing, Daniel Lie, Hanne Lippard and James Richards.
