= Hassan Diab (sociologist) =

Canadian terrorist (born 1953)

- حسن دياب
- Born: Hassan Naim Diab; November 20, 1953 (age 73); Beirut, Lebanon
- Occupation: University Professor
- Known for: Sociology, 1980 Paris synagogue bombing
- Conviction: Terrorism
- Criminal charge: Terrorism
- Penalty: Life imprisonment

Academic background
- Education: Lebanese University; Syracuse University
- Thesis: The Dynamics of Disparity: Social Repercussions in Lebanon of Beirut's Financial Role in the Middle East (1943-1975) (1995)

Academic work
- Discipline: Sociologist
- Sub-discipline: Public welfare

Hassan Naim Diab (Arabic: حسن نعیم دياب; born November 20, 1953) is a Lebanese-Canadian citizen. He was convicted in a controversial April 2023 trial in absentia at the Court of Assize in Paris of having planted the explosive in the 1980 Paris synagogue bombing.

In 2008, France officially requested his extradition for his alleged involvement in the 1980 synagogue bombing. Diab's appeal to the Ontario Court of Appeal was denied, and the Supreme Court of Canada refused to hear the case. On April 4, 2012, the Canadian Minister of Justice, Rob Nicholson, committed Diab to extradition to France. After a 6 year legal battle, on November 14, 2014, Hassan was extradited from Canada to France where he was held in pretrial detention at Fleury-Mérogis Prison for 3 years and two months without trial while the investigation continued.

On January 12, 2018, the charges against Diab were dismissed, after French anti-terrorism magistrates found that there was no evidence to justify trial. Diab said that he was in Beirut, Lebanon, at the time of the attack, taking his University exams, and also noted that his fingerprints and palm prints did not match those of the suspect. Two days later, on January 14, 2018, he was unconditionally released and he returned to Canada. The French anti-terrorism Prosecutors appealed the decision, arguing the judges made major mistakes. In January 2021, the Paris Court of Appeal reversed the dismissal of charges and ordered that he stand trial. Hassan Diab refused to attend the trial and his lawyers attempted to stop it. On May 19, 2021, France's most important judicial court, the Court of Cassation ordered the trial to go ahead. On April 21, 2023, Diab was convicted of terrorism charges in absentia and sentenced to life in prison. The decision was reached unanimously. The court, composed of six French judges, issued an international arrest warrant.

Evidence presented against Diab in France included a sketch of the bomber that resembled him. A hotel registration form with block printing used a different name from Diab's. A fingerprint on the form was not Diab's. A passport in his name which he had lost was discovered in the bag of a terrorist. The passport had entry and exit stamps from Spain, where the terrorist team is believed to have fled after bombing the synagogue.

Diab has consistently contested the accusation, saying he was in Lebanon at the time of the terrorist attack, and that he had witnesses and evidence to prove it. He compared his case to the Dreyfus Affair, creating controversy. The court assessed his alibi as having no credibility. Diab's supporters said there was no material element to prove that he, then a sociology student, was in France at the time. His lawyers said he had been sitting exams at a university in Lebanon and could not have used the passport, which he said he had lost.

== Early life and education ==
Diab was born in Lebanon on November 20, 1953, and studied sociology at the American University of Beirut, receiving a Bachelor of Arts in 1982. He studied at Syracuse University in Syracuse, New York from 1987, receiving his PhD in sociology in 1995.

He married Rania Tfaily in a Muslim marriage ceremony some time after 2005. He moved to Ottawa in 2006. He is a dual citizen of Lebanon and Canada.

== Charges ==
Diab was arrested by the Royal Canadian Mounted Police (RCMP) on November 13, 2008, at the request of French authorities who wanted him extradited to stand trial for his alleged role in a 1980 bombing outside a synagogue on Rue Copernic in Paris. He faced charges of murder and attempted murder in connection with the bombing, in which four people were killed and dozens injured by the detonation of about 10 kilograms (22 lb) of explosives hidden in the saddlebags of a parked motorcycle.

Diab denied all charges. His lawyer said the arrest was "a mistaken identification", and that Diab did not enter France in 1980. Friends, colleagues and former professors of Diab expressed shock and bafflement at the news of his arrest. His thesis adviser, Louis Kriesberg, a noted scholar of conflict resolution, said he never knew Diab to be in any way antisemitic and called the news "not credible".

== Termination of teaching contract ==
In early July 2009, Diab was hired to teach a summer course in introductory sociology at Carleton University in Ontario. On July 28, the day after a bail hearing disclosed his employment and subsequent teaching, B'nai Brith Canada released a statement condemning Carleton for employing a suspected terrorist. "We find it deplorable that university officials believe that there is nothing wrong with employing Diab. The safety and security of the community as a whole, and of the Carleton University campus in particular, are of great concern to us." The Toronto-based national office of B'nai Brith issued a statement condemning Carleton's actions, while an Ottawa-based member of the group telephoned the university directly to complain.

The university confirmed to the CBC that Diab was teaching the course. Later that day, university officials cancelled Diab's contract and named a replacement, stating that Diab had been replaced "in the interest of providing students with a stable, productive academic environment that is conducive to learning." "The university did the right thing," B'nai Brith's executive vice-president, Frank Dimant, said of Carleton's about-face in not allowing Diab to teach."

Many Carleton University professors supported Diab, stating that his termination violated the university's contract obligations. The Canadian Association of University Teachers (CAUT) issued a press release condemning the actions of Carleton's administration.

== The case ==
Based on information from intelligence agencies of Germany obtained from former members of the group, French authorities alleged that Diab was a member of the Popular Front for the Liberation of Palestine, the group blamed for the bombing. Evidence unsealed as part of the extradition case, in April 2009, included two police sketches made some time after the bombing. Samples of Diab's handwriting, while a student at Syracuse University years later, were subjected to handwriting analysis. One French expert stated that the handwriting was definitely Diab's, though it appeared efforts had been made to change it. In fact, the handwriting sample used had been written by his wife. Another French expert said Diab could have written the registration card.

In October 2009, Diab’s lawyer submitted to the Canadian court several reports produced by experts in Canada, the United States, France and the United Kingdom. The lawyer informed the court that intelligence experts were prepared to explain the difference between evidence and intelligence and its "inherent secrecy and non-disclosure". Moreover, handwriting experts, including a top British expert, characterized the evidence tendered by French authorities as "demonstrably false". The Crown, on behalf of France, retracted the evidentiary nature of its original handwriting experts and asked the court for more time in order to obtain another opinion. The evidence was withdrawn when Diab's lawyer showed that the comparison handwriting samples used were not written by Diab.

The reports were the subject of an evidentiary hearing in December 2009. At the end of the hearing, the judge decided that the defence was permitted to file reports from all of their four handwriting experts, and could call any two of these experts to testify at the extradition hearing. The Crown would be allowed to cross-examine all four of the defence handwriting experts if it so chose. The defence called University of Toronto law professor Kent Roach to testify as an expert on the issue of intelligence as evidence at the extradition hearing; he testified as to the unreliability of using intelligence as evidence on November 24 and 25, 2009, in Ottawa.

== Extradition hearing ==
An extradition hearing had, temporarily, been scheduled to begin in January 2010. However, on December 18, 2009, the Crown Attorney (representing The Attorney General of Canada) requested an adjournment of the hearing to review the defence evidence. The next possible date for the extradition hearing was to have been June 2010.

The judge hearing the case stated that he wanted to start the flow of evidence soon and suggested that he was becoming weary of delays by the French government in presenting its case. The hearing was scheduled to begin on November 8, 2010.

On May 17, 2010, the hearing scheduled to begin June 14, 2010, was again delayed after France disavowed the evidence of two handwriting experts discredited by the defence. The Crown planned instead to introduce evidence from a third, new French handwriting expert, who found a "very strong presumption" that Diab was the author of the hotel registration card. Kent Roach, the expert defence witness, accused the French government of "dragging its feet", "cherry picking evidence" and "bootstrapping" by requesting a delay while justice officials in Paris gathered more evidence. Defence counsel called the Crown's new plan "absolutely scandalous". He went on to say, "At the 11th hour and 59th minute they withdraw their entire handwriting case and substitute a new case."

Diab's lawyer also accused French authorities of finding a new handwriting expert in an attempt to save their case after the two they originally used were discredited by four defence handwriting experts, including a former RCMP document examiner. On December 6, 2010, the presiding judge ruled to allow the testimony of three more defence handwriting experts, but said that he would not necessarily give it any weight in his final analysis.

A former RCMP forensic document examiner, Brian Lindblom, was retained by the defence and testified on December 13, 2010, on the handwriting analysis submitted by France's new, and third examiner, Anne Bisotti. Stating that the new report submitted by the Crown was "often confusing and incomprehensible", Lindblom criticized the mandate given to Bisotti, by Magistrate Marc Trévidic. Trévidic instructed that the analysis be done to "'determine if he (Diab) is certainly or may be the writer.' There appears to be no room for an objective consideration of the possibility that the author of the sample material may not be the writer; he is presumed to be the writer." "The mandate is designed not to seek objective evidence," Lindblom testified. Bisotti's handwriting analysis was the third sent to the court after France disavowed two previous analyses when the defence demonstrated their unreliability.

=== Judicial decisions ===
On June 6, 2011, Justice Robert Maranger committed Diab for extradition and stated that "regrettably" he had no jurisdiction to grant bail. Diab was taken into custody pending a bail hearing. Maranger said the evidence against Diab was "weak", but that France had shown a prima facie case and Canada must expect France to give Diab a fair trial. On April 4, 2012, the Minister of Justice, Rob Nicholson, ordered Diab extradited to France to face terror bombing charges. Diab's lawyer was expected to appeal that decision. In May 2014, the Court of Appeal for Ontario confirmed the extradition order, writing that the minister's holding decision was "reasonable" and that he must be sent to face trial in France.

On November 13, 2014, the Supreme Court of Canada refused to hear Diab's appeal. Diab was extradited to France on November 14, 2014, to face investigation by the French legal authorities, as the main suspect of the 1980 attack.

Hassan Diab was held in Fleury-Mérogis Prison, a high security correctional centre in southern Paris. No trial was ever scheduled. In December 2014 an article in the Ottawa Citizen stated that: "A French magistrate formally charged Diab the day he arrived in Paris but it is expected to take at least 18 months of investigation before he stands trial, if the French decide to proceed with the case." On May 17, 2016, a French judge released Diab from jail, requiring him to wear a monitoring device, but allowing him to walk alone three hours a day. Prosecutors reportedly filed an appeal to the release order.

=== Release ===
Diab was released from the French prison on January 13, 2018 shortly after the charges had been dropped by French judges. The anti-Zionist news website Mondoweiss describes this release as being a result of French investigative judges finding evidence that agreed with Diab's assertion that he was in Lebanon at the time of the attack. Diab returned to Ottawa, Ontario, Canada on January 15, 2018, travelling by way of Iceland, after Canadian diplomats were able to secure his immediate return. He had initially been released but ordered to remain in France while the prosecution filed an appeal.

=== Appeal, trial and conviction ===
On 27 January 2021, France's court of appeal ordered Diab to stand trial, three years after two senior French magistrates set him free due to a lack of evidence. Diab's French lawyers said they plan to appeal the decision to France's Supreme Court. In 2022, Amnesty International secretary general Agnès Callamard wrote to the prosecutors asking them to drop all charges.

On May 19, 2021, France's highest court of appeal, the Court of Cassation, upheld prosecutors' decision to try Diab. On April 21, 2023, Diab was declared guilty of terrorism charges in absentia and sentenced to life in prison.

== Aftermath ==
Robert Currie, a professor of international law at Dalhousie University in Halifax, as well as other lawyers (including Donald Bayne, who acted for Diab), have cited the Diab affair as an illustration of flaws in Canada's Extradition Act. In May 2018, Amnesty International and the British Columbia Civil Liberties Association jointly called for the federal government to launch a thorough and independent inquiry into Hassan Diab’s extradition to France, including the conduct of Canadian officials during extradition hearings.

In 2018, Minister of Justice Jody Wilson-Raybould ordered reviews of the extradition. Murray Segal was appointed to conduct the external review. Segal's findings were provided to Wilson-Raybould's successor, David Lametti, in May 2019, and subsequently made public several months later. The review cleared Canadian prosecutors of any wrongdoing, but also made recommendations to improve the extradition process. Diab's lawyer, Donald Bayne, called the review a "whitewash".

In 2024, Carleton University faced considerable criticism from parts of the Jewish community after hiring Diab to teach a course on 'social justice in action'. Independent Jewish Voices Canada and l’Union Juive Française pour la Paix (UJFP) however note that for a second time in a decade, France was seeking to extradite Dr. Hassan Diab for a crime that he did not commit.
