= Nicolas Hénin =

French journalist

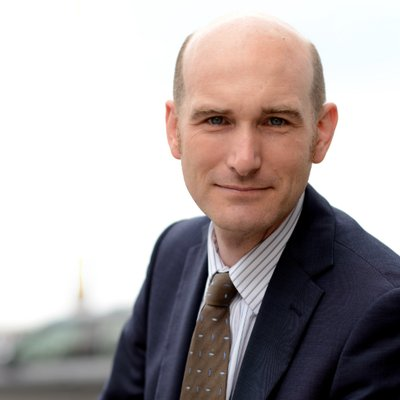
- Nicolas Hénin, 2015 portrait by Ammar Abd Rabbo.
- Born: 7 November 1975; Le Mans
- Alma mater: Lycée Henri-IV; Paris 1 Panthéon-Sorbonne University; Institut Pratique du Journalisme; Lycée Fénelon, Paris
- Occupation: Journalist
- Employer: Radio France, Le Point, Arte, Radio Vatican, Marianne, Le Monde, Jeune Afrique
- Works: Comprendre le terrorisme, Haytham, une enfance syrienne, Jihad Academy, La France russe, enquête sur les réseaux Poutine, Notre monde est-il plus dangereux ? 25 questions pour vous faire votre opinion, Papa Hérisson rentrera-t-il à la maison ?
- Spouse(s): Isabel Hénin
- Parent(s): Pierre-Yves Hénin
- Awards: National Medal of Recognition for victims of terrorism (2018); Chevalier des Arts et des Lettres (2019); Knight of the National Order of Merit (2022)

Nicolas Hénin (born 7 November 1975 at Le Mans) is a French journalist who publishes in written media, radio and television. As a specialist of the Middle East, he has covered the Iraq War and the Syrian Civil War. He was captured by ISIS in Syria on 22 June 2013, along with three other Frenchmen, and held hostage until 18 April 2014. After his liberation, Hénin co-founded Action Résilience, a network promoting level-headedness in anti-terrorism, and had become a notable voice in the fight against hate speech.

He attended the 69th national session of the Institute of Advanced Studies in National Defence (IHEDN). He is a member of the European Commission's RAN (Radicalisation Awareness Network) Experts Pool, of the FrancoPrev network of the Organisation Internationale de la Francophonie and a member of the Unesco-Prev Chair in Prevention of Radicalisation and Violent Extremism hosted by the Université de Sherbrooke, Concordia University and Université du Québec à Montréal.

== Biography ==
=== Early life ===
Nicolas Hénin was born to the family of a professor of Lycée Henri-IV and of academic Pierre-Yves Hénin; his grandfather was agronomist Stéphane Hénin. After graduating from lycée Henri-IV, he went on to study in a classe préparatoire at lycée Fénelon and graduated with a Licence in Geography and a Master in History from Panthéon-Sorbonne University. After studying Arabic, he specialised on the Middle East, and obtained a Master in International Relations with a thesis titled Egyptian interarabic relations and the separate peace with Israel: November 1977 (Les relations interarabes de l’Égypte et la paix séparée avec Israël : novembre 1977), written during a research semester at Cairo at CEDEJ (Centre d'études et de documentation économiques et juridiques). He then published articles in Jeune Afrique on the Sudan Civil War in 1997, and a photographic reportage on Yemen, le Yémen, un pays en armes, published in the monthly Arabies in November 1999.

After returning to France, he studied at Institut pratique du journalisme (IPJ), graduating in 1999.

=== Early career ===
Nicolas Hénin started working at Infomedia, only to resign in November 2002 to work as an independent in Iraq. He reported for several months on the runup to the Iraq War and later for the whole of the conflict, notably for Radio France. He then reported on the aftermath of the Invasion, first in Baghdad until September 2004, and then from Amman, where he sought a safe location upon request from the management of Radio France, following the abduction of Christian Chesnot and Georges Malbrunot. He then went on to reporting about Africa and the Middle East for several French-language media, such as Le Point, Arte, Radio France, RTBF, Radio Télévision Suisse, Radio Canada, Marianne and L'Hebdo.

He worked as a chief operator for images and as researcher for the documentary film Tonnerre roulant sur Bagdad, by Jean-Pierre Krief, broadcast on Arte for the tenth anniversary of the invasion.

He performed several assignments on crisis in Sudan, Somalia and Yemen as correspondent for Le Point as well as for TV reportage, most of them by the Solas Films agency, broadcast notably on Arte. Since the events of the Arab Spring, Nicolas Hénin has covered events in Egypt, Libya, Yemen and Syria, where he made five trips from 2011 to June 2013.

Nicolas Hénin has been nominated several times for the Bayeux-Calvados Awards for war correspondents in radio (2004 and 2011), TV reporting (2008) and printed press (2013).

=== Abduction by ISIS and captivity in Syria ===
On 22 June 2013, agents of ISIS abducted Hénin as he was on assignment at Raqqa, along with photographer Pierre Torrès. The abduction was initially kept a secret upon request of Hénin's and Torrès' families, before being publicised by French Prime Minister Jean-Marc Ayrault on 9 October 2013. French authorities reported that signs of life had been recorded in August and October 2013.

In captivity, Hénin met with other hostages, notably US journalist James Foley.

A number of support actions and demonstrations organised notably by the "Hostages in Syria" committee were held to push for Hénin's and Torrès' liberation, as well as that of Didier François and Edouard Elias, who had been captured on 6 June. Hénin's Alma mater IPJ (Institut pratique du journalisme) named its 34th class after him. The four hostages were eventually freed on 18 April 2014. Although little information was released on Hénin's conditions in captivity, he stated that he had escaped after three days, on 22 June 2013, but had been recaptured after a night trying to flee.

On 26 April 2014, the German weekly Focus stated that France had paid 18 million dollars to secure the hostages' freedom.

In September 2014, after the allegations were made in Le Monde, Hénin confirmed that Mehdi Nemmouche, suspected in the Jewish Museum of Belgium Shooting, had been one of his guards in Syria and had treated him with brutality.

=== Reporting on Jihadism ===
In September 2014, he was awarded the Fondation May Chidiac Award for courage in journalism.

In March 2015, he published the essay Jihad Academy on policy mistakes against ISIS, and Papa hérisson rentrera-t-il à la maison?, a children's book illustrated by his fellow hostage Pierre Torres. During an interview in the TV show On n'est pas couché, he chastised the policies of the Obama administration towards Syria.

In 2018, a group of Syrian refugees identified 35-year-old Kais A., also known by his nom-de-guerre "Abu Hamza al-Kimawi" ("the Chemist"), a terrorist and explosive expert of the Islamic State, infiltrated in Germany under the guise of a chemistry student at the University of Göttingen. Abu Hamza having been instrumental in Hénin's and Torres' capture by ISIS in 2013, the group contacted them. Hénin forwarded the information to the French anti-terrorist jurisdiction, who had Abu Hamza arrested by the German police in order to be extradited to France.

=== Reporting on Russian connections in France ===
In 2016, Hénin published La France russe, enquête sur les réseaux Poutine ("Russian France: investigation into Putin's networks") in which he argues that "Russian intelligence services spend as much resources on France as they used to during the Cold War" ("les services de renseignement russes consacrent à la France autant de moyens que lors de la Guerre froide"), and that "just like when the Komintern was active and the Soviet Union would buy support from 'brotherly Parties', Moscow today still buys her supporters" ("comme du temps du Komintern, où l’Union soviétique finançait des 'partis frères', Moscou achète aujourd’hui ses soutiens"), and states that politicians such as Nicolas Sarkozy, François Fillon, Jean-Luc Mélenchon and Marine Le Pen have been "seduced" by putinism.

Hénin notably gave an account of the first meeting between Nicolas Sarkozy and Vladimir Putin, where he claims that Putin had bullied and intimidated Sarkozy into such a state of shock that he seemed drunk during the press conference immediately following the event. Amongst the critics of the book, Tigrane Yégavian argued that Hénin overstates influence of Moscow, which he deems to be far weaker than US soft power and support networks, and called the description of Putin's and Sarkozy's meeting outlandish; Jean-David Levitte, an advisor to Sarkozy, also dismissed this account.

=== Fight against hate speech and cyberbullying ===
In February 2019, Hénin was targeted by a cyberbullying operation organised by far-Right accounts. Hénin had reported Patrick Jardin, father of a victim of the November 2015 Paris attack, after Jardin had first demanded French Jihadists captured in Syria be summarily shot instead of brought back to France to stand trial, and then, in a tweet of 31 January, demanded their children be killed as well: "Then let us kill their children as well, that is where we should start" ("Alors tuons aussi leurs enfants, d’ailleurs on devrait commencer par là"). Nicolas Hénin reacted by calling upon witnesses to report the tweet to Twitter moderators and to Pharos, the French authority where illegal activity on the Internet can be reported: "Please report this account to Twitter and Pharos. Having lost a child in terrible circumstances is no excuse for such a torrent of hate" ("Merci de signaler ce compte à Twitter et Pharos. Avoir perdu son enfant dans des conditions terribles n’est pas une excuse pour déverser un tel torrent de haine"). In retaliation, several far-Right Twitter accounts came in support of Jardin and issued death threats against Hénin and his children. Hénin filed charges.

Hénin heads Action Résilience, a consulting company specialised in anti-terrorism and de-radicalisation.

On 16 September 2019, Hénin was promoted to Knight of the Ordre des Arts et des Lettres.

== Sources and references ==
=== Publications ===
- Jihad Academy, Paris, Éditions Fayard, coll. « Documents », 2015, 260 p. ISBN 978-2-213-68656-1
- Papa Hérisson rentrera-t-il à la maison?, Flammarion, 2015 (avec Pierre Torres)
- La France russe, enquête sur les réseaux Poutine, Éditions Fayard, 2016, 322 p.
- Haytham, une enfance syrienne, Dargaud, 2016 (avec Kyungeun Park)
- Comprendre le terrorisme, Éditions Fayard, 2017, 280 p.

=== External links ===
- Site du comité de soutien aux otages en Syrie
