= Trévidic =

Trévidic is a surname. Notable people with the surname include:

- Albert Trévidic (1921–2012), activist of the Breton language and culture
- Marc Trévidic (born 1965), French judge
