= 1981 Antwerp synagogue bombing =

Truck bombing in Belgium

Antwerp bombing
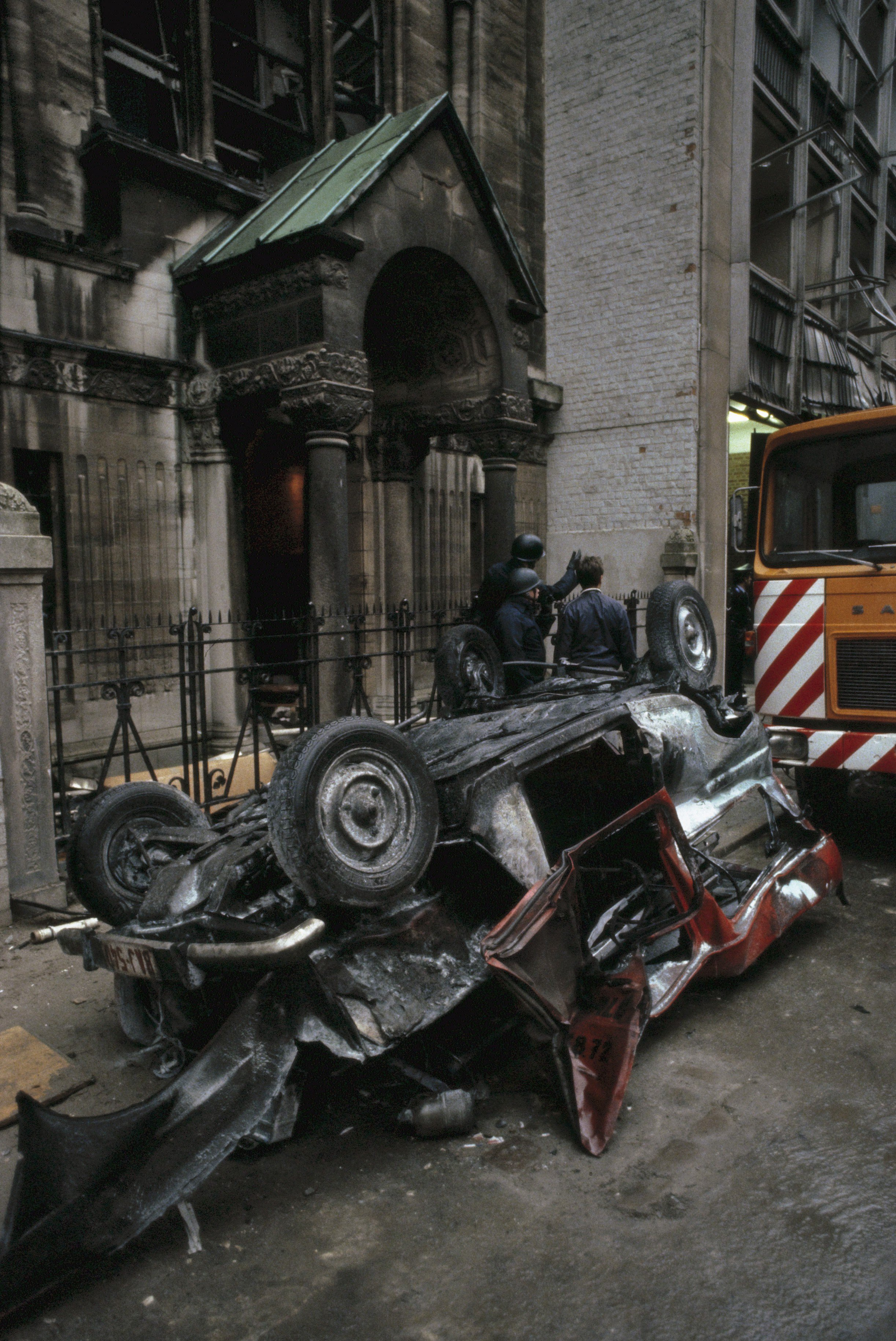
- Location: 51°12′54″N 4°25′8″E; Antwerp, Belgium
- Date: 20 October 1981; 45 years ago ≈9:00 AM
- Target: Synagogue
- Attack type: Truck bombing, murder
- Weapon: Bomb
- Deaths: 3
- Injuries: 106
- Perpetrator: Black September Organization
- Motive: Antisemitism, Palestinian nationalism

On 20 October 1981, a truck bomb exploded outside a Portuguese Jewish synagogue in the centre of Antwerp, Belgium, in the diamond district of Antwerp. The explosion took place shortly after 9:00 AM on a Tuesday morning, a few minutes before Simchat Torah religious services were to begin. Three people were killed and 106 wounded.

== Bombing ==
The bomb had been concealed in a delivery truck parked overnight with one wheel removed as if it had broken down. The explosion blew in the doors and stained-glass windows of the synagogue and smashed storefronts and windows for blocks around. After the blast, only the vehicle's axles, glass, and other debris remained. Police sources said the registration number on the van's chassis revealed it was bought from a Brussels second-hand car dealer. It carried a transit license plate of the kind issued to foreigners residing for a short while in Belgium. The licence was taken out by a young dark-haired man who gave his name as Nicola Brazzi and an address which later proved to be that of Brussels hotel. The investigation showed that Brazzi, believed to be Lebanese, had never registered at the hotel. The same name was found on a register of another hotel where he had entered his nationality as Cypriot.

== Responsibility ==
The Palestinian terrorist group Black September claimed responsibility for the attack, the group which previously staged a number of terrorist attacks, including the 1972 Munich Olympics massacre in which 11 Israeli athletes and a West German policeman were killed, and in which five of the eight guerrillas were killed. A local television station also claimed that the Belgian cell of Action Directe also claimed responsibility for the attack, but the Antwerp police said that the group had not been heard of before in Belgium. Within a week Belgian police in Ghent arrested three German neo-Nazis for the attack. In November 2008, a 55-year-old man of Palestinian origin and with Lebanese and Canadian passports was arrested in Ottawa, Canada, on a provisional extradition warrant for the 1980 Paris synagogue bombing and as a suspect for the Antwerp bomb attack.

== Other attacks ==
The attack was one year after the 1980 Paris synagogue bombing, which also took place on the eve of Simchat Torah. The Belgian prime minister of the time, Mark Eyskens condemned the attack as "diabolically wicked", saying it was "clearly another attack against the Jewish community." It was the second anti-Jewish incident in Antwerp in three months. There was also an attack on Jews in Antwerp in July 1980. A Palestinian threw a hand grenade at a party of Jewish schoolchildren leaving for a vacation, killing one and wounding 20 others. The attacker was arrested and convicted. In May 2014 there was an attack on the Jewish Museum of Belgium in which four people were killed.

== See also ==
- Terrorism in the European Union
- 1980 Antwerp summer camp attack
