= B'nai Brith Canada =

Canadian Jewish service and advocacy organization

B'nai Brith National Organization of Canada
- Formation: 1875; 151 years ago
- Type: Non-governmental organization
- Headquarters: 15 Hove Street; North York, (Note: The City of North York was formally dissolved in 1998, when it was amalgamated with the other lower-tier municipalities of Metropolitan Toronto to form the single-tier City of Toronto government.) Ontario; M3H 4Y8
- Region served: Canada
- Services: Advocacy; education; network; social work
- Members: 4,000 (2007)
- Official language: English; French
- Chief Operating Officer and CEO: Simon Wolle
- Parent organization: B'nai B'rith International
- Website: www.bnaibrith.ca

The B'nai Brith National Organization of Canada, commonly known as B'nai B'rith Canada (/bəˌneɪ ˈbrɪθ/ bə-NAY BRITH; BBC; from Hebrew: בני ברית, romanized: b'né brit, lit. 'Children of the Covenant') is a Canadian Jewish service organization and advocacy group founded in 1875. It is the Canadian chapter of B'nai B'rith International and has offices in Toronto, Winnipeg, Montreal, and Vancouver. The organization describes itself as engaged in strong pro-Israel advocacy, as well as combating antisemitism, bigotry, and racism in Canada and overseas. It also provides community and social services for Jewish Canadians.

== Mission ==
The organization presents the following mission statement, as stated in the preamble to its constitution:

B'nai Brith has taken upon itself the mission of uniting person of the Jewish faith in the work of promoting their highest interest and those of humanity; of developing and elevating the mental and moral character of the people of our faith; of inculcating the purest principles of philanthropy, honour and patriotism; of supporting science and art; alleviating the wants of the poor and needy; visiting and caring for the sick; coming to the rescue of the victims of persecution; providing for, protecting and assisting the aged, the widow and the orphan on the broadest principles of humanity.

== Early history ==
In 1875, Lodge No. 246, located in Toronto, was the first lodge founded in Canada, followed soon after by another in Montreal. Many community leaders were associated with these lodges. Over time, a team of dedicated volunteers and professional staff emerged.

== Recent history ==
In September 2014, Ontario lawyer and former Conservative Party candidate Michael Mostyn was appointed CEO of B'nai Brith Canada, succeeding Frank Dimant upon his retirement after 36 years with the organization. Mostyn continued as CEO until February 2025, when he died from cancer. Judy Foldes became Acting CEO in February 2024 when Mostyn went on leave to undergo cancer treatment. Simon Wolle was appointed CEO effective October 20, 2025.

=== Role in the 2007 by-election ===
During the 2007 by-election in Outremount the group accused Jocelyn Coulon of being anti-American and anti-Israel because of his views on the Hamas-Israel-Lebanon conflict. The Quebec-Israel Committee however, stated that B'nai Brith's statements were exaggerated and that Coulon had every right to be the Liberal candidate. These issues were thought to be important because the Jewish community in Outremont made up 10% of the riding population.

=== Criticism of the Manitoba Human Rights Commission ===
In January 2004, Shahina Siddiqui, executive director of the Islamic Social Services Association, filed a formal complaint against B'nai Brith Canada under the "discriminatory signs and statements" section of the Manitoba Human Rights Code. After speaking with several people who attended a Winnipeg conference on terrorism hosted by B'nai Brith Canada in October 2003, she wrote that the event was biased against Muslims and would encourage the response teams in attendance to engage in racial profiling. The Manitoba Human Rights Commission (MHRC) accepted the complaint and began an investigation that would last five years. In 2009, the MHRC issued a report that dismissed the complaint due to a lack of evidence. MHRC vice-chairwoman Yvonne Peters subsequently wrote that "the full investigation of the complaint that took place was warranted" and that "the decision was based solely on the insufficiency of the evidence with respect to this particular section of the Human Rights Code."

In 2008, David Matas, B'nai Brith's senior counsel, sharply criticized the MHRC for its conduct during the investigation, stating that: "The [Manitoba] Human Rights Commission itself is supposed to be promoting human rights, but in our view in this process it's violating some pretty basic rights: a secret proceeding, a faceless accuser, failure to disclose documents. These are basic procedural rights that are being violated." Writing in the National Post, Joseph Brean made several criticisms of the investigation: The MHRC accepted the complaint despite the fact that the complainant, Shahina Siddiqui, did not actually attend the event. B'nai Brith Canada was never told of the identity of the individuals whose claims Shahina Siddiqui based her complaint on. It has never been revealed what exactly is alleged to have been said at the conference. Tracy Lloyd, an MHRC investigator, spoke with seven anonymous witnesses, including one as late as November 2006. However, only one, a City of Winnipeg employee, shared Siddiqui's criticism that the conference was "one-sided." One of the witnesses, a diversity relations officer, stated that it was "pretty professional," and said police in general are capable of putting almost anything they hear into proper context. The MHRC commissioned a "secret expert report" but refused B'nai Brith's request to know the expert's identity, mandate or material provided. The secret report has not been made public.

Following the release of the MHRC report, Matas accused MHRC vice-chairwoman Yvonne Peters of taking a contradictory position, stating that: "So what they're saying is that a full investigation is warranted even when there's no evidence, as long as the accusation is within the jurisdiction of the board. There's a lot of problems with this. What basically happened is that Siddiqui heard a rumor. She makes a complaint, as a result of which the commission goes on a five-year fishing expedition. They don't find anything. We're co-operating with them. And then they dismiss the complaint. That's not a proper procedure, in my view." Matas also criticized the procedures of the MHRC, stating that they will "take an allegation, without evidence, and just run with it to see if it's true." The previous year, Matas in a submission in a Moon Report on Internet hate speech, Matas charged that Canada's human rights commissions have demonstrated "a disastrous combination of investigative zeal and substantive ignorance." Although Matas stated that he does not believe Siddiqui acted in bad faith, he added that: "The people who run these procedures have to have a more objective viewpoint than the people who make the complaint."

=== Hassan Diab complaint ===
In July 2009, B'nai Brith Canada issued a press release denouncing Carleton University for hiring Hassan Diab, who was alleged by French authorities to have been responsible for the 1980 Paris synagogue bombing. Diab was living under virtual house arrest at the time (he had been granted bail but under very strict conditions) due to an extradition request from France. Within a few hours of the B'nai Brith Canada complaint, Carleton University announced that it would "immediately replace the current instructor, Hassan Diab" in order to provide students "with a stable, productive academic environment that is conducive to learning." B'nai Brith executive vice-president Frank Dimant later stated that "the university did the right thing." In November 2014, Hassan was extradited from Canada to France where he was imprisoned for 3 years and two months while the investigation continued. Since then, four French anti-terrorism judges have uncovered testimony from several individuals stating that Diab was in Lebanon at the time of the bombing as well as university records which show he wrote and passed exams in Beirut then and couldn't have been in Paris. In January 2018, French authorities dropped all charges against Hassan Diab, citing lack of evidence.

=== Hassan Guillet controversy ===
In 2019, B'nai Brith unearthed a series of controversial comments and social media posts made by Hassan Guillet, a parliamentary candidate for the Liberal Party in that year's Canadian federal election. When B'nai Brith went public with its findings, the Liberal Party dropped Guillet as a candidate.

=== Lobbying against Islamophobia Bill ===
B'nai Brith lobbied against certain wording in the non-binding parliament bill M103. Bill M103 denounces Islamophobia and other type of hates. The bill was introduced after the killing of 6 Muslims at a Quebec mosque by an extreme-right sympathizer

=== Free speech conference ===
Continuing on with the free speech advocacy, B'nai Brith organized a free-speech conference with free-speech advocacy and alt-right groups. The conference was scheduled to be hosted at a synagogue, but some Jewish groups asked the synagogue to cancel the events after concerns about alt-right and Islamophobic groups taking part.

== Members ==
According to an article in The Forward, B'nai Brith Canada had 4,000 full-dues paying members in 2007. Membership is restricted to those of the Jewish faith.

=== Governance and financial issues ===
In 2007, a group calling itself Concerned Members of B'nai Brith Canada charged that a new constitution had been passed despite a majority of members having voted against it at a general meeting. Henry Gimpel, a former Toronto lodge president, told The Forward that "[t]here's too much of [B'nai Brith Canada] being run by one person." Frank Dimant, CEO of BBC, responded to the criticism over the constitution by saying that BBC followed proper governance procedures and that B'nai Brith International's Court of Appeal determined that the constitution was properly enacted. Gimpel and seven other BBC members were expelled in June 2008 for what a disciplinary committee determined to be "conduct unbecoming a member." Gimpel referred to the committee as a kangaroo court.

On July 8, 2015, the Toronto Star reported that Dimant has demanded an annual retirement payout of $175,000, representing 75% of his former salary, which the B'nai Brith believes is too lucrative and will require the struggling charity to direct fundraising dollars to pay for Dimant's pension. Dimant has stated that the payout was approved by the organization's board, however, the Star cites an unnamed source as stating that the deal was arranged with little oversight while Dimant was still in charge. In the year following Dimant's retirement, B'nai Brith Canada put its "state of the art" care facility for Alzheimer's patients under insolvency protection while also trying to sell it. The project, initiated and led by Dimant, is a $16 million facility opened in 2013 but that been unable to attract enough patients, due to high fees for patients of $7,500 a month and the fact that it was not designed to be wheelchair accessible; the facility is losing $50,000 a month and owes $11 million to creditors.

The Toronto Star article also claimed that other issues left by Dimant's former management of B'nai Brith are a lack of records and record keeping and failure to always issue charitable tax receipts and poor corporate governance with approximately 50 people who had believed they were on various boards of B'nai Brith organizations learning that this is not the case, as Dimant's management had failed to file the correct paperwork with government agencies.

Due to financial difficulties, including a decline in charitable donations in recent years, B'nai Brith also ceased publication of its newspaper, Jewish Tribune in 2015, and is selling its headquarters which carries two mortgages totalling nearly $4 million, though the building itself is assessed at slightly over $3 million. It was reported by The Forward in 2007 that the organization was struggling financially and mortgaged its head office in order to raise $850,000 to meet expenses. In 2015, the organization indefinitely suspended publication of Jewish Tribune and announced the sale of its heavily mortgaged headquarters at 15 Hove Street.

== Defamation lawsuits ==
=== Luba Ferdorkiw lawsuit ===
Luba Fedorkiw a candidate for the Progressive Conservative Party in Winnipeg during the 1984 general election, sued B’nai Brith Canada after a local newspaper reported that it was investigating allegations that she had made antisemitic comments. The investigation ultimately revealed no evidence of antisemitism. Fedorkiw was awarded $400,000 in damages, which at the time was one of the largest damage awards in Canadian legal history.

=== Lesley Hughes lawsuit and settlement ===
In 2008, the Liberal Party of Canada dropped as a candidate and revoked the membership of Winnipeg Centre candidate Lesley Hughes after she was accused of antisemitism by the group, the Canadian Jewish Congress and Conservative MP Peter Kent over a 2002 article about the 9/11 attacks. Hughes later filed a lawsuit for defamation against B'nai Brith, the Canadian Jewish Congress and Peter Kent. The suit was settled out of court for an undisclosed settlement amount. The parties issued a public statement stating that Hughes is not an antisemite, stating that Hughes "does not condone the use of anti-Semitic conspiracy theories by racist groups to support antisemitism of any nature".

=== Dmitri Lascaris lawsuit and settlement ===
Dimitri Lascaris is a lawyer, activist, and was formerly the Green Party’s Justice critic. In 2016, Lascaris expressed sympathy for a man whose family home was demolished by Israeli authorities after his son had been extrajudicially killed by the Israeli forces for being an alleged terrorist. B’nai Brith published an article and tweet alleging that Dmitri Lascaris “advocates on behalf of terrorists.” Lascaris sued B'nai Brith for defamation.

B’nai Brith attempted to block the lawsuit using Ontario's legislation to prevent strategic lawsuits against public participation (anti-SLAPP). It was successful in Ontario’s Superior Court, but that decision was overturned by the province’s Court of Appeal.The Supreme Court did not grant leave to appeal the Ontario Court of Appeal's decision, clearing the way for the defamation lawsuit to go to trial. In 2021, the matter was settled out of court with B’nai Brith deleting the materials complained of, and its insurer compensating Lascaris for his legal fees.

=== Canadian Union of Postal Workers (CUPW) lawsuit and settlement ===
In 2018, CUPW sued B’nai Brith for suggesting that the union supported terrorism in newsletters and Facebook posts because it had co-operated with Palestinian postal workers. B’nai Brith tried to have the case dismissed using Ontario’s anti-SLAPP legislation, which is designed to block lawsuits intended to stifle speech and legitimate criticism of matters of public interest. However, B’nai Brith lost its motion to have the case dismissed in both Superior Court, which noted that B’nai Brith's defence “is not a ‘slam dunk’ — to the contrary, there are significant issues about truth, good faith, responsibility and malice.” This decision was upheld by the Ontario Court of Appeal. The lawsuit was settled out of court for an undisclosed settlement amount and B’nai Birth apologized for the harm its publications may have caused CUPW and its members.

=== Other ===
In 2022, Javier Davila, an educator at the Toronto District School Board, sued B’nai Brith and its then CEO, Michael Mostyn, for defamation

In 2023, B'nai Brith launched a defamation lawsuit against David Mivasair, a rabbi who is a pro-Palestinian activist, for, among other things, describing B'nai Brith as an "anti-Palestinian hate group." B'nai Brith later withdrew its legal action.

== Initiatives ==
=== Publications ===
B'nai Brith Canada owned and operated the weekly Jewish Tribune as a subsidiary publication. The newspaper claimed a circulation of over 62,000 copies a week which would make it the largest Jewish publication in Canada. Publication was suspended in early 2015.

=== Annual antisemitism audit ===
Since 1982, B'nai Brith Canada has published an annual audit of antisemitism in Canada. Its 2024 annual report said that "antisemitism reaches record levels", having identified 6,219 hate incidents targeted against Jews during the year, the highest number of such incidents since the organization started their audit, an increase of 7.9% from the previous year and more than doubling since 2022. The 2025 audit showed 6,900 incidents of Jew hatred, an increase of 9.4% from the previous report and the third consecutive year in which the audit showed record levels of antisemitism.

=== Hezbollah terror designation ===
On November 29, 2002, B'nai Brith Canada sued the Canadian government for "failing to crack down on the fundraising efforts of Hezbollah", by not adding Hezbollah's charity wing to the list of banned terrorist organizations; the paramilitary wing of Hezbollah, the Jihad Council, was already listed, but not its political wing. About a week later, the Canadian government made the decision to designate all of Hezbollah as a terrorist organization.

=== Anti-hate hotline ===
B'nai Brith Canada operates a 24-hour-a-day, seven-day-a-week 'Anti-Hate Hotline'. The hotline receives calls from those who feel they have suffered from antisemitism or discrimination and is one of the sources of the organisation's statistics for its Annual Audit of Antisemitic Incidents.

=== Radical Islam advertisement ===
On November 9, 2009, B'nai Brith Canada ran a full page ad in the National Post comparing radical Islam with Nazism. Frank Dimant, CEO of B'nai Brith, said "overall, feedback from the ad has been very positive." At the same time, the ad drew the ire of the group Canadian Jewish Holocaust Survivors and the Canadian Association of Jews and Muslims, and has also led to accusations of racism and Islamophobia against the organization.

=== Investigations of antisemitism in the media ===
In February 2016, the organization revealed that the Windsor, Ontario newspaper 'al-Forqan' called for terrorist attacks against Israeli civilians as "sacred duty of jihad". In July 2016, B'nai Brith Canada, organization with the London Police Services, investigated 'al-Saraha,' a London, Ontario newspaper for Holocaust denial.

== Agencies and programs of B'nai Brith Canada ==
- 24-hour, 7-day-a-week Anti-Hate Hotline
- Affordable Housing
- Alzheimer's Residence, Toronto
- Annual Audit of Antisemitic Incidents
- Campus Outreach Program
- Canadian Israel Public Affairs Committee (CIPAC)
- Centre for Community Action
- Communications Department
- Community Volunteer Service Programs
- Government Relations Office
- Institute for International Affairs
- Jewish Canada Information Service
- League for Human Rights
- Legal Desk
- National Task Force on Holocaust Education, Remembrance and Research
- Network of B'nai Brith Lodges
- Operation Thank You: Educational Initiative Honouring Canadian Troops in Afghanistan
- Sports Leagues
- Young Leadership Development Groups

== Awards ==
Canadian Prime Minister Stephen Harper was awarded B'nai B'rith International's Presidential Gold Medal after being nominated by B'nai Brith Canada to honor what it described as his commitment to the Jewish people and the State of Israel.

Canadian film producer Robert Lantos has been a long-time supporter of B'nai Brith Canada and in 2008 was awarded the organization's Award of Merit. Among other notable Canadians to have received the Award of Merit are Lindsay Gordon, Blake Goldring, Frank Stronach, Tony Comper, Al Waxman, Wallace McCain, Lloyd Axworthy, Gordon F. Henderson, Mayor Jean Drapeau, George Cohon, Leo Kolber, former Liberal Prime Minister of Canada Paul Martin, hockey legend Jean Béliveau, Paul Tellier, former Ontario Premier Bill Davis, Ambassador Allan Gotlieb, Monty Hall, Izzy Asper, Guy Charbonneau, former Manitoba Premier Gary Filmon, former Liberal Deputy Prime Minister of Canada Herb Gray, former Alberta Premier Peter Lougheed, Edward Samuel "Ted" Rogers, former Alberta Premier Ernest Manning, and Calin Rovinescu.

== See also ==
- B'nai B'rith International
- B'nai B'rith Youth Organization

=== Archives ===
There is a B'nai Brith Canada fond at Library and Archives Canada. The archival reference number is R6348, former archival reference number MG28-V133. The fond covers the date range 1887 to 1999. It includes 45.92 meters of textual records, 1,622 photographs, audio-visual material and other graphic material.
