= Jewish Museum of Belgium shooting =

2014 terrorist attack in Brussels, Belgium

Coordinates: 50°50′27″N 4°21′12″E

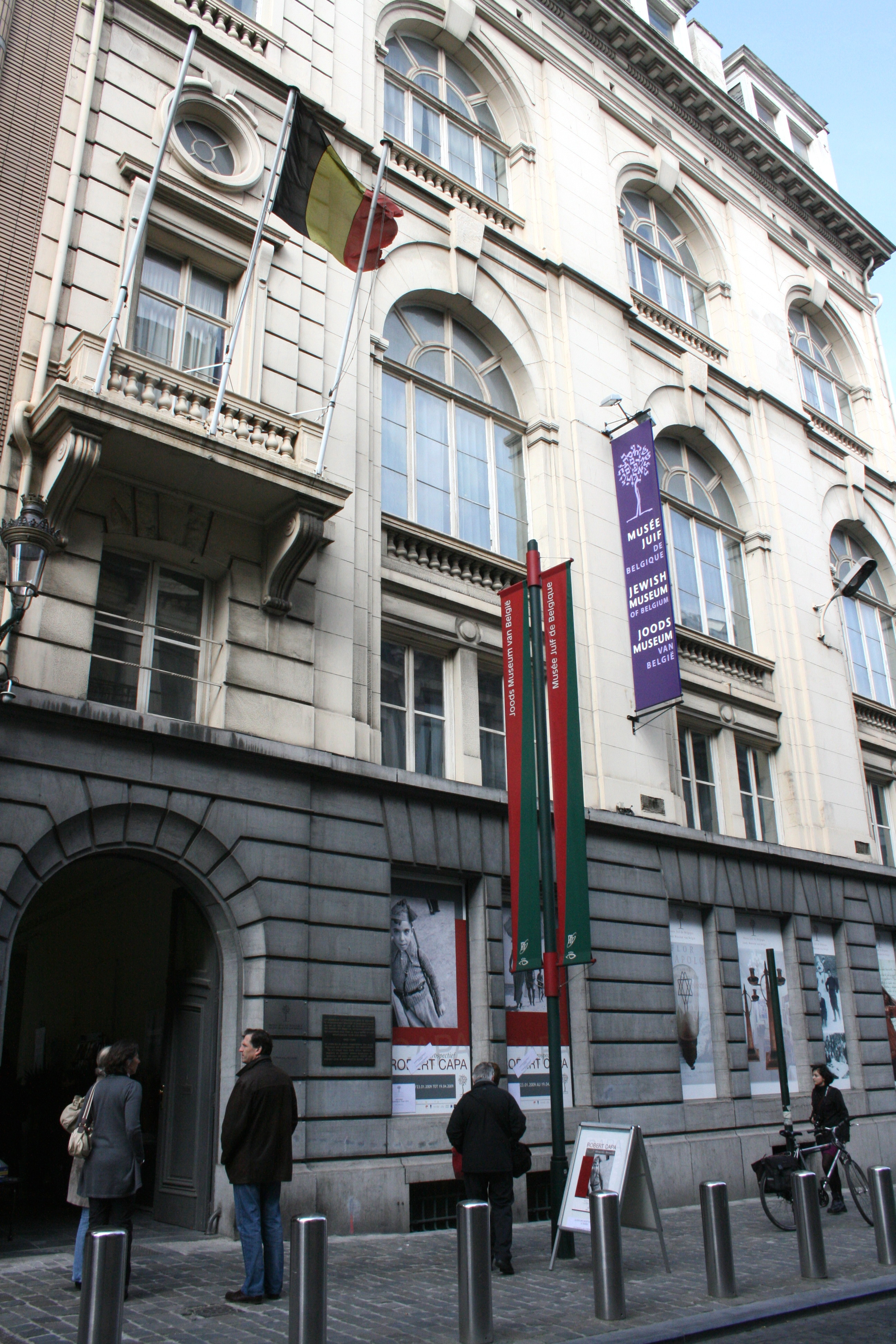
- The Jewish Museum of Belgium, pictured in 2009
- Location: Jewish Museum of Belgium, Brussels, Belgium
- Date: 24 May 2014; 15:47 CEST (UTC+02:00)
- Attack type: Mass shooting, mass murder, terrorism
- Weapons: Zastava M70AB (semi-automatic rifle); Llama Scorpio (.38-caliber revolver)
- Deaths: 4
- Perpetrators: Mehdi Nemmouche; Nacer Bendrer (accomplice)
- Motive: Ideology of the Islamic State antisemitism
- Convictions: Nemmouche: life imprisonment Bendrer: 15 years imprisonment

On the afternoon of 24 May 2014, a gunman opened fire at the Jewish Museum of Belgium in Brussels, killing four people in an antisemitic Islamist terrorist attack. Three of them, an Israeli couple on holiday and a French woman, died at the scene. The fourth victim, a Belgian employee of the museum, later died of his injuries in hospital. Six days after the attack, on 30 May 2014, Mehdi Nemmouche, a 29-year-old French national of Algerian origin, was arrested during a routine drugs check in Marseille, France, when he was found to be carrying weapons identical to those used in the shooting. A second suspect, Nacer Bendrer, was later identified and arrested.

Nemmouche had previously spent time in French prisons, where he embraced Islamic extremism. Upon his release, he spent more than a year in Syria. It was in prison that he met Bendrer, who supplied him with the weapons used in the attack. Investigators identified a third suspect, but charges against him were dismissed on the grounds of insufficient evidence.

Nemmouche and Bendrer were formally indicted in April 2018, and tried before the court of assizes of Brussels in early 2019. After two months of hearings, Nemmouche was found guilty of four terrorist murders, whilst Bendrer was found guilty of being an accomplice by supplying Nemmouche with weapons. The theory that Nemmouche was framed by foreign intelligence officials, put forward by his defence, was rejected. Nemmouche was sentenced to life imprisonment whilst Bendrer was sentenced to 15 years. Both were later also sentenced to pay close to one million euro in damages to the victims' next of kin. This was the first attack committed by the Islamic State in Europe.

== Shooting ==
On the afternoon of 24 May 2014, Nemmouche walked up to the Jewish Museum of Belgium in the Sablon/Zavel district in central Brussels carrying a handgun. He shot an Israeli couple in the entrance to the museum and then approached the reception desk, where he shot a Belgian employee of the museum. He next took an assault rifle out of a bag to shoot a French female volunteer at her desk in a nearby room, after which he fled the scene on foot and disappeared into the crowd. The attack, which lasted less than ninety seconds, was captured on the museum's security cameras. The Israeli couple and the French volunteer died instantly, while the Belgian employee was critically injured and died nearly two weeks later in hospital. According to security camera footage, the attacker appeared to wear a chest-mounted camera, like Mohammed Merah, who filmed his acts during the 2012 Toulouse and Montauban shootings, although the camera failed during filming.

The Belgian Minister of Foreign Affairs, Didier Reynders, was in the vicinity of the museum and heard the gunshots. The Minister of the Interior, Joëlle Milquet, was also nearby and arrived on the scene a few minutes later.

=== Victims ===
Four people were killed in the shooting: Emmanuel and Miriam Riva, a middle-aged Israeli couple on holiday from Tel Aviv who were visiting the museum; Dominique Sabrier, a French museum volunteer in her sixties; Alexandre Strens, a Belgian employee of the museum in his twenties. The first three victims died instantly, while the fourth died nearly two weeks later in hospital, having never regained consciousness after being shot in the head.

Emmanuel and Miriam Riva were buried in Tel Aviv on 27 May 2014, with the Belgian ambassador to Israel attending the ceremony. Alexandre Strens, who was born in Morocco to a Jewish mother and Algerian Berber father, was buried in a Muslim cemetery in Taza, Morocco on 10 June 2014.

== Investigation ==
A nationwide manhunt was launched for the attacker. Belgian police appealed to the public to help identify him, releasing CCTV from the museum which showed his image, partly obscured. The police described him as being of medium height and athletic build, and wearing a dark baseball cap. A man who was seen driving from the museum was detained, but released after questioning, and remained a witness in the investigation. On the day after the attack, deputy prosecutor Ine Van Wymersch said the shooter "probably acted alone, was armed and well prepared" and stated that the motive for the attack was still open. The following day, it was announced that the attack was being investigated as a terrorist incident.

=== Perpetrator ===
Mehdi Nemmouche (Arabic: مهدي نموش; born 17 April 1985), a 29-year-old French citizen, was arrested on 30 May 2014 at the Saint-Charles railway/bus station in Marseille during a random drugs search when he got off a coach arriving from Amsterdam via Brussels. He was found to be carrying two weapons identical to those used in the attack, a white sheet bearing ISIS insignia, and a video with an ISIS flag in which he claimed responsibility for the killings.

Nemmouche was born in Roubaix, a French town near the Belgian border. He was taken into care at the age of three months following neglect by his single mother and placed with a foster family. At the age of sixteen, by which time he already had a criminal record, he was moved to a group home in Paris. At the age of seventeen he went to live with his Algerian grandmother in Tourcoing. Between 2007 and 2012 he spent five years in various prisons in the south of France after being convicted of robbery. Nemmouche became radicalized in prison and left for Syria in December 2012, soon after his release. Once in Syria, he joined the ranks of ISIS and became one of the jailors of French hostages. He was the first European to commit an attack upon returning from Syria. In January 2014 he was in contact with Abdelhamid Abaaoud, the ringleader of the November 2015 Paris attacks.

Nemmouche initially contested his extradition to Belgium under a European arrest warrant. He dropped his appeal against extradition after guarantees that Belgium would not transfer him to Israel and was returned to Belgium at the end of July 2014, two months after his arrest.

In January 2025, Nemmouche went on trial in Paris as one of five men accused of the kidnapping and torturing of four French journalists in Syria between 2013 and 2014. He was found guilty and received a life sentence.

=== Indictment ===
The Belgian federal prosecutor's office, which was responsible for the investigation, requested the council chamber of the tribunal of first instance of Brussels to start indictment proceedings for Nemmouche and Bendrer at the end of 2017. The federal prosecutor's office also requested that the charges against a third suspect, a friend of Bendrer who had been implicated, be dismissed. On 25 January 2018, the council chamber ruled on the requests: Nemmouche and Bendrer were referred to the chamber of indictment of the court of appeal of Brussels, but so was the third suspect. Despite the request of the federal prosecutor's office, the charges against the latter were thus not dismissed.

On 19 April 2018, the chamber of indictment ruled on the issue: Nemmouche and Bendrer were formally indicted, but contrary to the council chamber the chamber of indictment considered the evidence against the third suspect to be too weak. The third suspect was thus not indicted and the charges against him dismissed. This meant that only Nemmouche and Bendrer would stand trial for the terrorist attack before the court of assizes.

== Court trial ==
=== Hearings ===
==== Preliminary proceedings ====
In January 2019, the trial of Mehdi Nemmouche and Nacer Bendrer, who was accused of being an accomplice, started before the court of assizes of Brussels. In the Belgian criminal justice system, a court of assizes holds jury trials for the most serious crimes. It is a non-permanent court that is only composed once a case has been referred to it by means of an indictment. A few weeks before the actual start of the trial, a preliminary hearing took place on 20 December 2018, during which a list of about 120 witnesses, which were to be heard in the case, was decided on. A request by Nemmouche's defence attorneys to adjourn the case was refused.

On 7 January 2019, three days before the start of the actual trial, the members of the jury were selected. For the jury selection, 200 Belgian citizens were summoned to the Palace of Justice of Brussels, where the trial was held. After a dozen of prospective jurors were challenged by both the defence and the prosecution, eight men and four women were eventually empaneled as jurors. An additional twelve people were also selected as alternate jurors.

==== Accusation ====
On 10 January 2019, the actual trial started with the prosecution reading the 195-page "act of accusation" to the court and jury, wherein it described the charges brought against the two men and the evidence gathered during the investigation. On 15 January, the defence attorneys of Nemmouche, amongst which Henri Laquay and Sebastien Courtoy, presented their "act of defence" in turn, in which they listed seven main arguments against the charges. They focused on the perceived lack of DNA traces on some of the material evidence, and accused the Mossad (foreign intelligence agency of Israel) of having set up Nemmouche. According to the defence, the Riva couple that were killed in the shooting were not tourists, but members of the Mossad. They also accused the Belgian investigators of being complicit and having doctored the evidence to frame Nemmouche. After the presentation of the defence, the presiding judge questioned both accused. Nemmouche admitted to being in the possession of the weapons, but denied having committed the attack. He refused to answer any further questions. Bendrer in turn answered the questions of the judge. He admitted Nemmouche asked to provide him with weapons, but denied having done so.

==== Testimonies ====
Over the next weeks, the court heard the testimonies of the firsthand witnesses, first responders, investigators, experts, and family members of both the victims and the accused. An important testimony was that of two French journalists, Didier François and Nicolas Hénin, who had been held hostage from 2013 to 2014 in Syria by ISIS operatives. They testified that Nemmouche, under the alias "Abu Omar", was one of their guards and torturers, and described him as being "sadistic, playful and narcissistic". The former director of the prison in Salon-de-Provence, France, in which both accused had been incarcerated in the past, testified that Nemmouche had radicalised during his prison stay. There was disagreement whether Bendrer also adhered to radical Islamic beliefs at the time. During the hearings, the investigators also rejected the assertion that the Riva couple were intelligence officers for the Mossad, as did attorneys of the Riva couple's family. Whilst the wife, Miriam Riva, did work for the Mossad until her retirement, she did so as an accountant and never came into contact with any intelligence operations, they stated.

A few incidents occurred during the trial hearings as well. Specifically, some jurors had to be replaced by alternate jurors for various reasons, such as illness or speaking out of court. In addition, on 29 January 2019, a dossier related to the case was stolen from the office of an attorney for one of the civil parties. The theft did not have an impact on the trial though.

==== Closing arguments ====
After all witnesses were heard, closing arguments were presented by all parties starting from 18 February 2019. First the attorneys for the civil parties (aggrieved parties seeking compensation, such as the victims' families) presented their arguments, and the following week the prosecution and defence did so too. According to the prosecution, it was clear that Nemmouche was the perpetrator of the attack. Bendrer on the other hand was not aware of what Nemmouche was going to do with the weapons he supplied, according to the prosecution, and should therefor not be found guilty of being a co-author but rather of being an accomplice in the attack (i.e. Bendrer's help was not indispensable in committing the attack). The defence of Nemmouche in turn brought up a number of arguments that in their view would prove Nemmouche was not the perpetrator, but rather the victim of an elaborate set-up. Amongst other things, they mentioned a lack of footage from security cameras other than those of the museum, accused the two French journalists who testified during the trial of lying, and suggested Nemmouche's DNA material was planted at the scene after the attack. According to the defence, Nemmouche was recruited by Iranian and Lebanese security services after being released from prison in 2012, and went to Syria to infiltrate ISIS on their behalf, after which he was sent to Brussels. They claimed that the victims were in fact Mossad operatives who were liquidated by the aforementioned security services, and that Nemmouche was used as a scapegoat.

On 4 March 2019, all parties were given the opportunity to reply to each other's arguments. The civil parties and the prosecution decried the defence's claims that Nemmouche was set up as conspiratorial, incoherent and false. They also took offence to the defence trying to shift the blame for the attack to the victims. The defence in turn held on to its arguments. The next day, the accused were given the last word before the jury would retire to consider its verdict. Whilst Nemmouche had remained silent throughout the trial up to that point, he did speak shortly. He endorsed the plea of his attorneys and stated he was indeed framed. Bendrer also spoke and stated he was afraid to be convicted.

=== Verdict ===
==== Mehdi Nemmouche ====
Jury verdict (in French)

On 7 March 2019, Mehdi Nemmouche was found guilty by the jury of the terrorist murders of the four individuals in the museum attack, and of the illegal possession of the weapons used in the attack. In the reasoning the jury gave for its verdict, required by Belgian law, the main evidence against Nemmouche was summed up. The evidence against Nemmouche that convinced the jury included the fact he was carrying the weapons used in the attack with him when he was arrested in Marseille, together with the clothing the perpetrator worn as seen on the security footage from the museum. Both the weapons and the clothing had his DNA on them, and gunshot residue was also found on the clothing in question. A footprint of the sneakers he had with him was found on the entrance door of the museum. When he was arrested, he was also carrying some electronic media with him, on which videos were discovered wherein Nemmouche claimed responsibility for the attack in the name of ISIS. An ISIS flag used in the videos was found along the weapons Nemmouche had with him upon his arrest. On other electronic media belonging to Nemmouche data was discovered, such as web browsing history, which proved Nemmouche had been planning the attack. Eyewitnesses identified Nemmouche as being the perpetrator. Lastly, on a computer belonging to Najim Laachraoui, one of the suicide bombers of the 2016 Brussels bombings, conversations were discovered wherein Nemmouche was described as a "brother", and plans were discussed to liberate him from his incarceration.

The jury considered that the material evidence and eyewitness testimony proved Nemmouche was the perpetrator of the attack. Based on the security footage of the museum, the expert testimony of the medical examiners who examined the bodies of the victims, and the type of weapons used, the jury found Nemmouche had the intention to kill. The jury furthermore affirmed the premeditated nature of the killings based on the preparatory acts Nemmouche carried out, such as the procurement of the weapons he used. The terrorist intentions of Nemmouche were upheld based on his jihadist stay in Syria from 2013 to 2014, the videos he made in which he claimed responsibility for the attacks in the name of ISIS, and the conversations about Nemmouche retained from Najim Laachraoui's computer. The verdict also rejected the claim that Nemmouche was set up by intelligence officials. The jury lamented that the defence did not bring forward any element that would support those allegations. The existence of a set-up was therefore deemed to lack "sufficient plausibility and credibility".

==== Nacer Bendrer ====
Aside from Nemmouche, the jury also found Nacer Bendrer guilty of weapons crimes and of being the co-author, and not just the accomplice, of the terrorist attack by supplying the weapons and ammunitions Nemmouche used. According to Belgian law, being the co-author of a crime means that one's aid was indispensable in the commission of the crime, i.e. that the crime would not have happened without this aid. The verdict stated Bendrer was aware of Nemmouche's radicalisation and adherence to Islamic extremist beliefs from when they got to know each other in 2009, during their incarceration in Salon-de-Provence, France. Telephone data showed that, after having had no contact for four years, Nemmouche sought contact again with Bendrer on 9 April 2014, after which Bendrer traveled to Brussels a few days later. After numerous contacts since, Nemmouche traveled to Bendrer's hometown Marseille, France, on 24 April 2014, and telephone data pinpointed him in the area of Bendrer's home around that time. After Nemmouche's return to Brussels, all contact ceased between them two. Investigators testified they took steps to hide their communications and encounters, by for example switching between multiple phone numbers and SIM cards.

The jury concluded their encounters could only have served to provide Nemmouche with weapons, because of the absence of any other plausible reason Bendrer had to travel to Brussels, because of the absence of any other source where Nemmouche could have procured the weapons from, and because Bendrer had later also admitted to investigators to have supplied Nemmouche with the weapons. As to the defence's argument that Bendrer did not know to which crime he would contribute, the jury retorted that Bendrer wilfully omitted to inform himself. The jury found that Bendrer should have known the weapons would be used to perform a terrorist act, based on their nature and based on the radicalisation of Nemmouche that Bendrer was aware of.

=== Sentence ===
Sentencing judgment (in French)

After the guilty verdict for both men, a sentencing hearing was held on 11 March 2019. Nemmouche and Bendrer could both have been sentenced to life imprisonment for the crimes they had been found guilty of. The prosecution did not see any mitigating circumstances on the part of Nemmouche, and requested a sentence of life imprisonment for him. Regarding the second accused, the prosecution requested a somewhat lighter sentence of 30 years of imprisonment for Bendrer because he did not directly participate in the killings. The prosecution also requested to sentence both men to a 15-year period of judicial surveillance. This provision would mean that if they were ever released on parole, they would be monitored by a sentence enforcement court, which could potentially revoke their release and order their incarceration for an additional 15 years. Bendrer's defence stressed he should not be treated the same way as Nemmouche, and that him having to live with the label of "terrorist" for the rest of his life was already a punishment in itself. Nemmouche's defence chose not to present any argument about the sentence.

After the court deliberated with the jury on the penalty, as per Belgian law, both men were sentenced on 12 March 2019: Nemmouche was sentenced to life imprisonment, while Bendrer received a 15-year prison sentence. In addition, Nemmouche was sentenced to a 15-year period of judicial surveillance, and Bendrer to a 5-year period of such surveillance. In its judgment, the court stated that the terrorist attack on the Jewish Museum constituted an attack on the fundamental values of Belgian society, in particular the freedom of religion of the Jewish community of Belgium. The court considered Nemmouche's troubled upbringing to be no mitigating circumstance for such a grave act, and it also took into account the violent nature of the murders, Nemmouche's rejection of the rechtsstaat, and his complete lack of empathy and respect for his victims, amongst other factors. According to the court, he presented a high risk of recidivism. Regarding Bendrer on the other hand, the court described him as having played a decisive role in the attack by supplying the weapons used to Nemmouche. The court considered he knew what they would be used for, and was indifferent to the consequences to others. However, the court also upheld some mitigating circumstances, such as Bendrer having steered clear of any Islamic extremism since his arrest, and him having shown empathy and regret for the victims. Bendrer was deemed to present a low risk of recidivism. After serving 30 years of a life sentence, Nemmouche will be deported to France.

=== Damages ===
Bendrer later lodged an appeal in cassation against his conviction with the Court of Cassation. This meant the civil part of the proceedings before the court of assizes (without the jury) with regards to damages had to be postponed. On 18 September 2019, the Court of Cassation rejected the appeal, which established the criminal sentence as final.

Subsequently, on 22 October 2019 the court of assizes awarded 985,000 euro in damages to the victims' next of kin and the Jewish Museum, to be paid by both convicts.

== Reactions ==
=== Domestic ===
==== Government ====
Belgium's Prime Minister Elio Di Rupo condemned the attack. "In Belgium we are not accustomed to such acts of barbarity," he said. Belgian Foreign Minister Didier Reynders, who arrived at the museum shortly after the shooting, wrote on Twitter: "Shocked by the murders committed at the Jewish Museum, my thoughts go to the victims that I saw on the site and their families". Minister of the Interior, Joëlle Milquet speculated that antisemitism might be behind the shootings and Brussels Mayor Yvan Mayeur described them as a likely terrorist attack. Belgian politician Mischaël Modrikamen, leader of a small conservative party and himself a member of Belgium's Jewish community, said "Sadly, however, the actual attack comes as no surprise to us after years of living in an atmosphere of rampant anti-Semitism that often leads to violence."

==== Organizations ====
Joel Rubinfeld of the Belgian League Against Antisemitism described the act as "the inevitable result of a climate that distills hatred ... it will be necessary to use all legal means to silence the preachers of this hate who are responsible for spreading this virus of anti-Jewish hatred", specifically mentioning the anti-Zionist and Holocaust-denying representative, Laurent Louis, and controversial French comedian Dieudonné. Louis denied Rubinfeld's accusations, suggesting that the attack could have been a false flag operation seeking to discredit him and his political party, Debout Les Belges! (Rise Up, Belgians), on the eve of the Belgian federal elections. The League of Muslims in Belgium condemned the attack as "barbaric". In a statement the league said, "These crimes with racist and anti-Semitic accents are unfortunately likely to reverse in our country the efforts of all those who, on a daily basis, are working for a society where everyone, regardless of his religious and philosophical beliefs, can live in dignity and respect."

=== International ===
==== Countries ====
French President François Hollande condemned the "horrifying killings with the greatest force." In a statement, he expressed France's solidarity with neighboring Belgium and condolences to the families of victims. Pope Francis, who was visiting the Middle East at the time of the attacks, said he was deeply saddened by the killings in "this criminal act of anti-Semitic hatred". "My thoughts go out to those who lost their lives in the attack in Brussels," he said. "I entrust the victims to God." Israeli President Shimon Peres also called upon European leaders to act against "any form of anti-Semitism" which he said was "rearing its head across the continent". Prime Minister Benjamin Netanyahu and Foreign Minister Avigdor Lieberman blamed anti-Israel incitement, especially in Europe, for the shooting, stating, "There are elements in Europe that rush to condemn the construction of a flat in Jerusalem but who do not rush to condemn, or offer only a weak condemnation of the murder of Jews here or in Europe itself." He praised Elio Di Rupo, who telephoned to express condolences and update the Israeli leader on the investigation. Lieberman further stated that the attack was the result of European antisemitism and incitement against the Jewish State.

Italian President Giorgio Napolitano recalled "the needing to keep in guard and be ready to wear out every regurgitation of antisemitism" and declared "I am always close to the world of Jewish communities yet again harshly hit". Ministry of Interior Angelino Alfano declared "Dead and injured from the Bruxelles' attack are also our dead and injured" and stressed that "there are no motives in the world that can allow all of this". Prime Minister of the Netherlands, Mark Rutte, conveyed his condolences to the prime ministers of Belgium and Israel. The Dutch minister of Foreign affairs, Frans Timmermans, expressed his solidarity to his Belgian colleague. He said that he was shocked by the cowardly attack. Carl Bildt, Swedish Minister for Foreign Affairs, wrote on Twitter: "Despicable attack on the Jewish Museum in Brussels. An affront against the values our modern Europe represents." Birgitta Ohlsson, Minister for EU Affairs, also wrote on Twitter: "I'm shocked about the anti-Semitic attack at the Jewish Museum in Brussels just one Day before the elections to the European Parliament." Ministry of Foreign Affairs issued a statement, offering condolences to the victims' families. In written statement, "Turkey hopes the attack was not related to "racist or anti-Semitic" motives. Or else we will be very concerned over the result of the latest EU Parliament elections, which was very disappointing."

==== Organizations ====
Roger Cukierman, head of French Jewish Association (CRIF), called for more resources to be given to the French foreign intelligence service, the DGSE, to track militants returning to France from Syria. The European Jewish Association's General Director, Rabbi Menachem Margolin, thanked the European leaders who had condemned the attack for their remarks, but stressed that, "condemnation after a predictable attack is nothing but a way to cleanse one's conscience. ... There is a need to establish a pan-European taskforce in order to annihilate anti-Semitism." He later added that, "Such an attack was to be expected in light of rising anti-Semitism in Europe. The governments of Europe have to take steps, words aren't enough." A spokesman for United Nations Secretary-General Ban Ki-moon said in a statement that the Secretary General "reiterates his strong condemnation of all forms of racism, racial discrimination, xenophobia and related intolerance and trusts that Belgian authorities will do everything possible to bring the perpetrator or perpetrators of this crime to justice swiftly." World Jewish Congress President Ronald S. Lauder reacted with shock, saying "Two years after Toulouse, and on the eve of the European elections, this despicable attack is yet another terrible reminder of the kind of threats Europe's Jews are currently facing."

== See also ==
- United States Holocaust Memorial Museum shooting (2009), a similar terrorist attack which targeted a museum about Jewish history and was motivated by antisemitism
- 1981 Antwerp synagogue bombing
- 2011 Liège attack
- 2016 Brussels bombings
- Antisemitism in contemporary Belgium
