= The Jewish Tribune (Canada) =

Canadian Jewish newspaper

- Type: Weekly newspaper
- Format: Tabloid
- Owner: Jewish Tribune Inc.
- Founder: B'nai Brith Canada
- Publisher: Michael Mostyn
- Editor: Norm Gordner
- Managing editor: Arie Dimant
- Founded: 1964 as The Covenant
- Ceased publication: January 29, 2015
- Political alignment: Conservative
- Language: English
- Headquarters: 15 Hove Street, North York, Ontario, Canada
- Circulation: 60,490 copies (as of September 2014)
- OCLC number: 43631482

The Jewish Tribune was a privately-owned community-based Canadian weekly Jewish newspaper founded by and closely associated with B'nai Brith Canada. It was founded in 1964 as The Covenant, B'nai Brith's in-house newsletter and was later relaunched in the mid-1990s as an external publication at which point it adopted the name Jewish Tribune. The Tribune was initially a fortnightly newspaper but became a weekly after several years. At its peak it had a circulation of over 100,000.

As of May 2013, The Jewish Tribune had a circulation of 60,500 copies a week which made it, for a time, the largest Jewish weekly publication in Canada. It was distributed in Toronto, Montreal, Ottawa, Winnipeg, Hamilton, and Windsor, both by regular mail and by the internet and was available for free from newspaper boxes, news stands, businesses, synagogues and various outlets, mostly in Jewish neighbourhoods.

Politically, the newspaper was generally conservative both in Canadian and Israeli politics and may be considered an ideological successor to the Jewish Times, a newspaper published by M.J. Nurenberger from 1974 to 1992 as a right-wing rival to the more centrist Canadian Jewish News. Many of the news items it carried documented activities of B'nai Brith Canada and generally reflected the views of the organization while being critical of, first, the Canadian Jewish Congress and then its successor, the Centre for Israel and Jewish Affairs.

Notable contributors to the newspaper included Mike Cohen, city councilman for Cote Saint Luc and Daniel Smajovits, a well-known Montreal-area writer. M.J.Nurenberger's daughter, Atara Beck, worked as a journalist for the Jewish Tribune for several years before emigrating to Israel in 2011, after which she freelanced as the paper's Israel correspondent.

The Jewish Tribune's main competition was the Canadian Jewish News (which temporarily ceased publication in 2013). It also competed with Shalom Life, an English-Hebrew publication aimed at Israeli Canadians in Toronto, and other regional Jewish publications.

B'nai Brith Canada CEO Frank Dimant was the newspaper's publisher from 1985 until September 2014 when incoming B'nai Brith Canada president Michael Mostyn was appointed publisher.

On January 29, 2015, B'nai Brith Canada announced that it was suspending publication of the periodical's print edition for 13 weeks, and possibly permanently. Though the organization claimed it would continue publishing the Tribune online, one of its columnists announced that staff had been laid off, and its website was not updated after the suspension was announced. Subsequently, it was reported that the newspaper folded as a cost-cutting move along with the sale of B'nai Brith Canada's headquarters and other facilities.
