= Frank Dimant =

Canadian activist

Frank Dimant (born 1945 or 1946) was executive vice president and CEO of B'nai Brith Canada, and was also CEO of the organization's Institute for International Affairs and the League for Human Rights, from 1978 to 2014. He also was the publisher of B'nai Brith's newspaper, Jewish Tribune from 1985 until September 2014.

Dimant was the CEO of Christians United for Israel Canada from January 2015 until 2019. He was, from 2015 until 2018, dean of the Modern Israel Studies Department at Canada Christian College and School of Graduate Theological Studies where he had been chair of the department since 2008. As of 2019, Dimant was no longer associated with the college.

Dimant was appointed national chairman of Likud Canada in June 2019.

== Background ==
Originally from Montreal, Quebec, Dimant was educated at Yeshiva University and at McGill University's Graduate School of Sociology. He describes himself as a "disciple of the teachings of Zev Jabotinsky".

Dimant was the central region director of the Canadian Zionist Federation in the early 1970s.

== B'nai Brith ==
Dimant retired from B'nai Brith Canada after a tenure of 36 years in September 2014 and was replaced by Michael Mostyn.

In 2014, Dimant told the Canadian Jewish News he planned to nominate Canadian Prime Minister Stephen Harper for the Nobel Peace Prize for his "moral leadership in the world… especially when it comes to standing up to radical Islamist terrorism." Dimant's announcement sparked a petition to the Nobel adjudication committee to protest the proposed nomination, stating it "would be a disgrace and insult to [the] prestigious award." In January of that year, Dimant and other Jewish leaders had accompanied the prime minister on his first trip to Israel, at which time Dimant praised Harper's "unparalleled" support for the Jewish state.

On July 8, 2015, the Toronto Star reported that Dimant had demanded an annual retirement payout of $175,000, representing 75% of his former salary, which the B'nai Brith believed was too lucrative and would have required the struggling charity to direct fundraising dollars to pay for Dimant's pension. Dimant stated that the payout was approved by the organization's board, however, the Star cited an unnamed source as stating that the deal was arranged with little oversight while Dimant was still in charge. In the year following Dimant's retirement, B'nai Brith Canada put its "state of the art" care facility for Alzheimer's patients under insolvency protection while also trying to sell it. The project, initiated and led by Dimant, was a $16 million facility opened in 2013 but that had been unable to attract enough patients, due to high fees for patients of $7,500 a month and the fact that it was not designed to be wheelchair accessible; the facility is losing $50,000 a month and owes $11 million to creditors.

The Toronto Star article also claimed that other issues left by Dimant's former management of B'nai Brith were a lack of records, failure to always issue charitable tax receipts and poor corporate governance, with approximately 50 people who had believed they were on various boards of B'nai Brith organizations learning that this was not the case, as Dimant's management had failed to file the correct paperwork with government agencies.
