= Marc Trévidic =

French magistrate (born 1965)

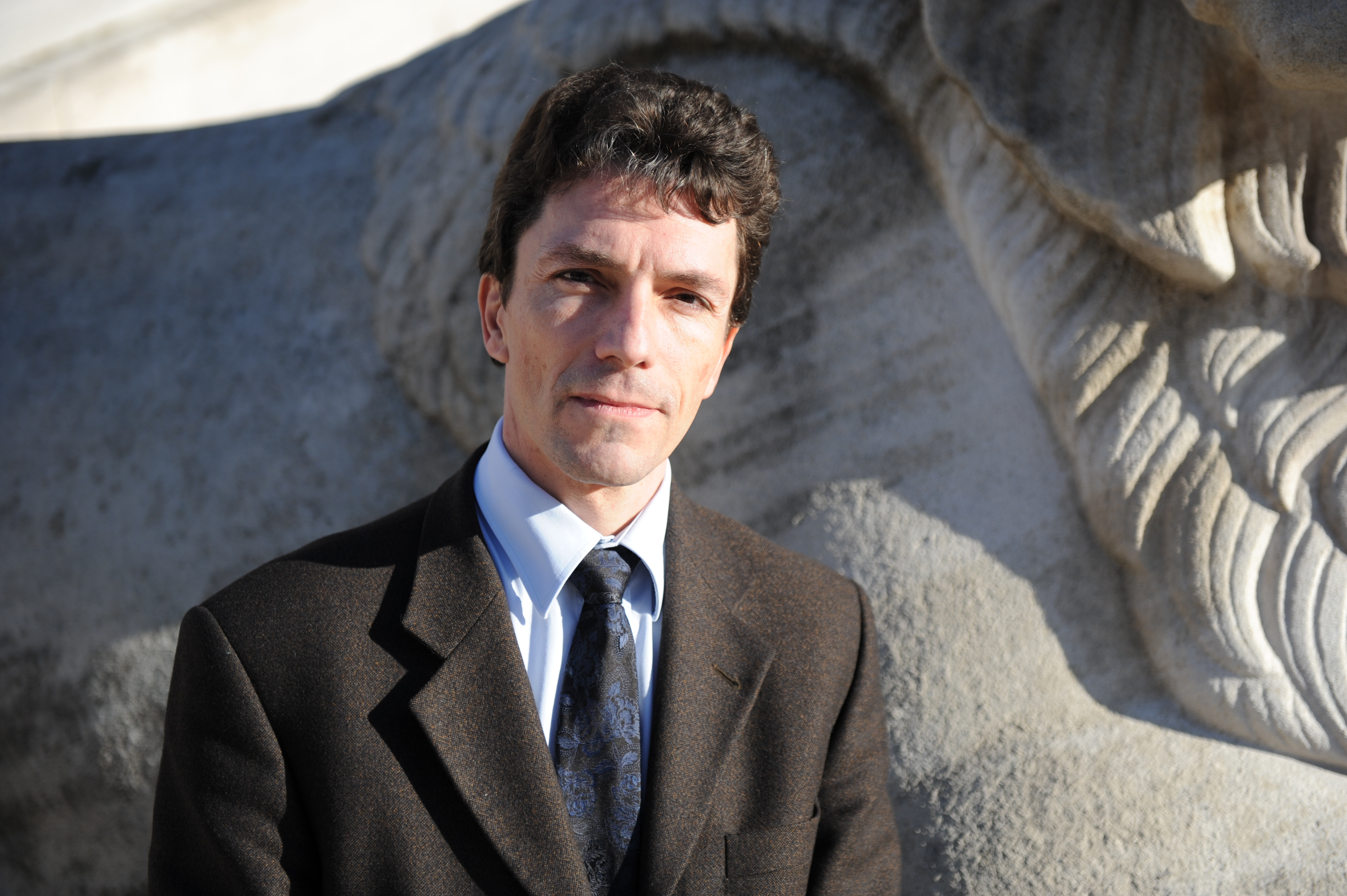
- Born: 20 July 1965 (age 60); Bordeaux, France
- Education: École Nationale de la Magistrature
- Occupation: Magistrate

Marc Trévidic (born 20 July 1965 in Bordeaux) is a French magistrate. From 2000 to 2015, he was an examining magistrate at the Tribunal de grande instance de Paris, specializing in fighting terrorism.

== Early life ==
Marc Trévidic was born to a Breton father and a Basque mother, both employed by Renault. After law school, he attended the French National School for the Judiciary.

== Career ==
He began his career as an examining magistrate in Péronne, Somme before becoming a junior Procurer-General in Nantes and then in Paris where he quickly moved to the anti-terrorism section. In 2003, he became an examining magistrate in Nanterre, integrating the anti terrorism focus in 2006.

He represented clients in 1980 Paris synagogue bombing, 2002 Karachi bus bombing and the Assassination of the monks of Tibhirine, among other cases. He stepped down as magistrate in 2015.

On September 7, 2009, he became President of the French Association of Examining Magistrates.

== Publications ==
- Marc Trévidic, Au cœur de l'antiterrorisme, Paris, éditions JC Lattès, 2011, 403 p. (ISBN 978-2-7096-3569-1)
- Marc Trévidic, Terroristes : Les 7 piliers de la déraison, Paris, éditions JC Lattès, 2013, 220 p. (ISBN 978-2-7096-4294-1)

== Notes and references ==
- Marc Trévidic, Au cœur de l'antiterrorisme, p. 24, 40
- Marc Trévidic. Le juge Breton qui défie Sarkozy [archive], Le Télégramme, 5 September 2010

== See also ==
- Renaud Lecadre, « Marc Trévidic, le juge batailleur », sur www.lemonde.fr, 16 February 2010
