= Didier François (journalist) =

French journalist

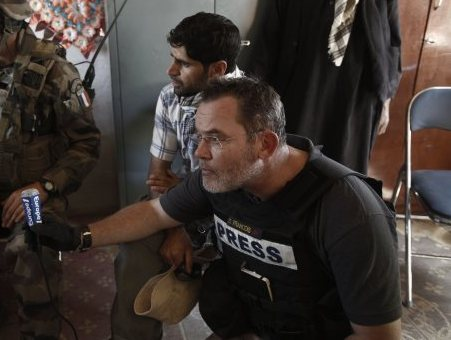
Didier François in Afghanistan

Didier François (known as "Rocky") is a French journalist. He has been a war reporter since September 1985. He has covered most of the conflicts in Africa, in the Caucasus, in the Balkans and in the Middle East. for the French daily Libération and for Europe 1 radio. He was a political activist and trade unionist during his studies.

== Biography ==
=== Education ===
After having received the best part of his primary education in Africa, he took Philosophy, History, Geopolitics and Strategic Affairs at the University of Paris Pantheon-Sorbonne. He received the Memorial Fellowship of the German Marshall Fund of the United States. He was also an auditor of the 62nd National Session of the Institute of Advanced Studies in National Defense (Institut des hautes études de défense nationale).

=== Activities ===
Through the 1970s Didier was actively involved in the Revolutionary Communist League., Then in the 1980s he served on the National Bureau of UNEF-ID (students’ union). In 1984 together with Julien Dray and Harlem Désir he created SOS Racisme., He is credited for having coined the society slogan "Don't touch my pal".

=== Journalistic career ===
He began journalism with Matin de Paris of 1 September 1985. He covered international news and specialized in the conduct of armed conflicts in Africa, Central America and the Middle East. When these subjects were not so active, he joined the Central Press Agency (ACP) as a reporter and followed the war in Afghanistan or between Iran and Iraq.

In June 1989, he took the job of a correspondent in South Africa, where he covered the fall of apartheid for Libération. In July 1991, he joined the Paris office of the newspaper as a war correspondent. He then continued as a permanent special envoy to the Soviet Union during the August 1991 coup, then to Bosniain July 1992. He followed the day-to-day collapse of the Soviet empire and the break-up of the Balkans. He was in Moscow from October 1994 to cover the first war in Chechnya. He successively took the job of a permanent special envoy to Kosovo in 1999, to Gaza in 2000, to Afghanistan from September 2001 and to Iraq from January 2003. Didier was appointed a Jerusalem correspondent in the summer of 2005. He covered the war in Lebanon before being shot in Gaza on 17 December 2006.

At the end of his convalescence, on 1 April 2007, Didier François joined Europe 1 radio as a reporter to covers international news, including the Arab Spring, as well as Defense and Terrorism issues. He notably accompanied the French forces in foreign operations in Afghanistan, Mali or Iraq, for Europe 1 and for Paris Match.

On 6 June 2013, he was kidnapped by the Islamic State of Iraq and the Levant north of Aleppo, where he was investigating the use of chemical weapons by the Syrian regime. He was released on 19 April 2014 at the same time as his fellow prisoner, photographer Edouard Elias and two other French colleagues also taken hostage in the region. Since his release, Didier François has resumed his activities as Grand reporter on Europe 1 radio.
