= 1980 Paris synagogue bombing =

Antisemitic terrorist attack in France

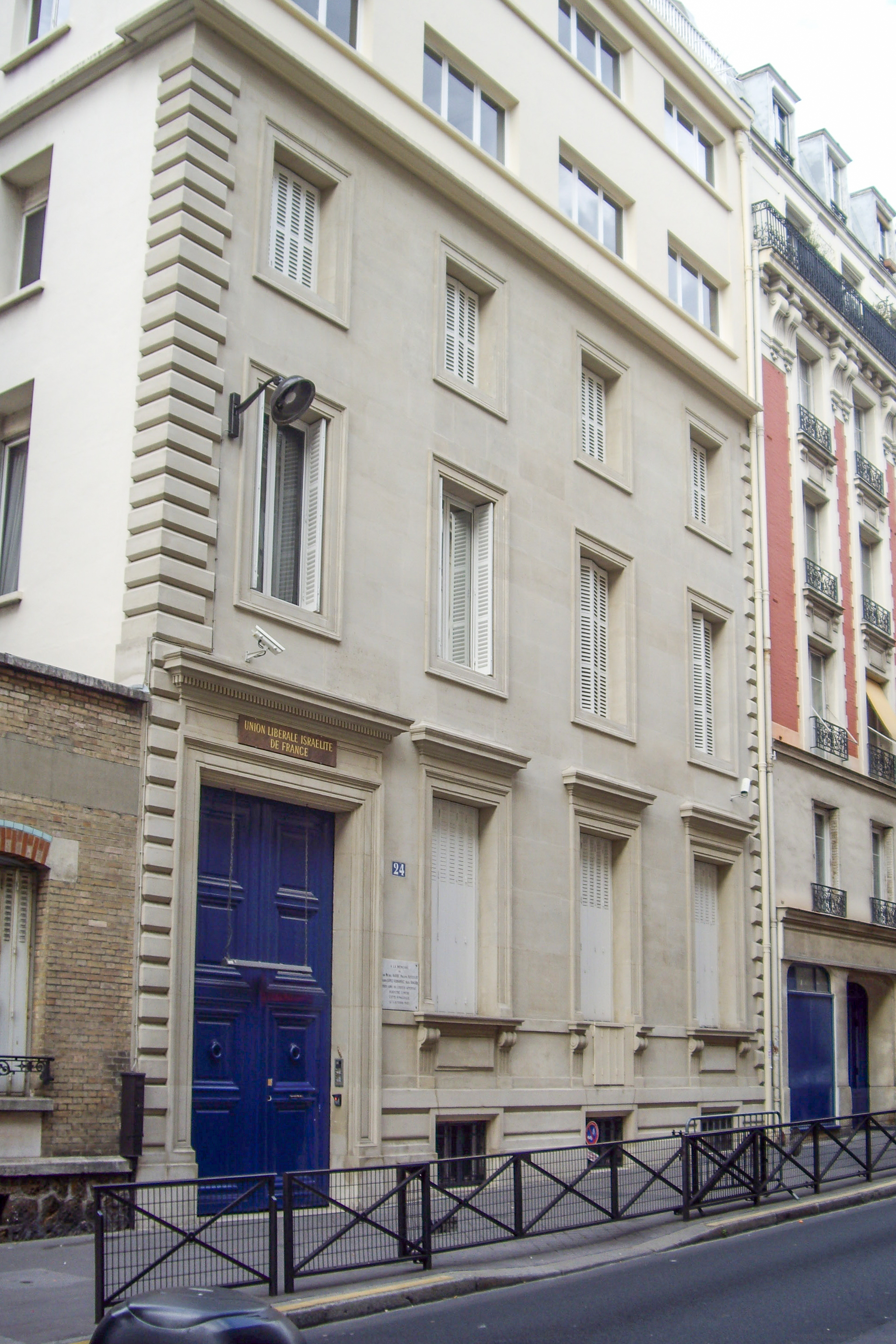
- The synagogue in 2010
- Location: 48°52′10″N 2°17′20″E; Rue Copernic synagogue, Paris, France
- Date: 3 October 1980; 18:38 (CET)
- Target: Jewish worshippers
- Attack type: Bombing
- Deaths: 4
- Injuries: 46
- Perpetrator: Hassan Diab
- Motive: Antisemitism

On 3 October 1980, a bomb exploded outside the rue Copernic synagogue in the 16th arrondissement of Paris, France, during Shabbat services. Approximately 320 worshippers were inside the synagogue when the bomb went off outside, killing four people and wounding 46. It was the first deadly attack against Jews in France since the end of the Second World War.

French investigators later attributed the attack to the Palestinian militant group Popular Front for the Liberation of Palestine. At the request of French authorities, Canadian police arrested university instructor Hassan Diab, a Canadian of Lebanese descent, in 2008, 28 years after the attack. After a protracted extradition fight, Diab was extradited to France and formally charged in 2014. He was allowed to return to Canada in 2018 after the charges against him were dropped.

In 2021, terrorism charges against him were reinstated. Diab was convicted in absentia in a controversial April 2023 trial for the attack.

== Attack ==
At 18:38 CET on Friday, 3 October 1980, a bomb exploded outside the rue Copernic synagogue, a Reform synagogue, in the 16th arrondissement of Paris, France. As it was Friday evening, the beginning of the Jewish holiday of Shabbat, the synagogue was filled with approximately 320 worshippers. Attendees were also celebrating the synagogue's five Bar Mitzvahs that weekend. According to the police investigation, saddlebags packed with 10 kilograms of explosives were left on a Suzuki motorcycle parked in front of the synagogue. The synagogue's glass roof collapsed on the worshipers, and one of the synagogue's doors was blown through.

=== Victims ===
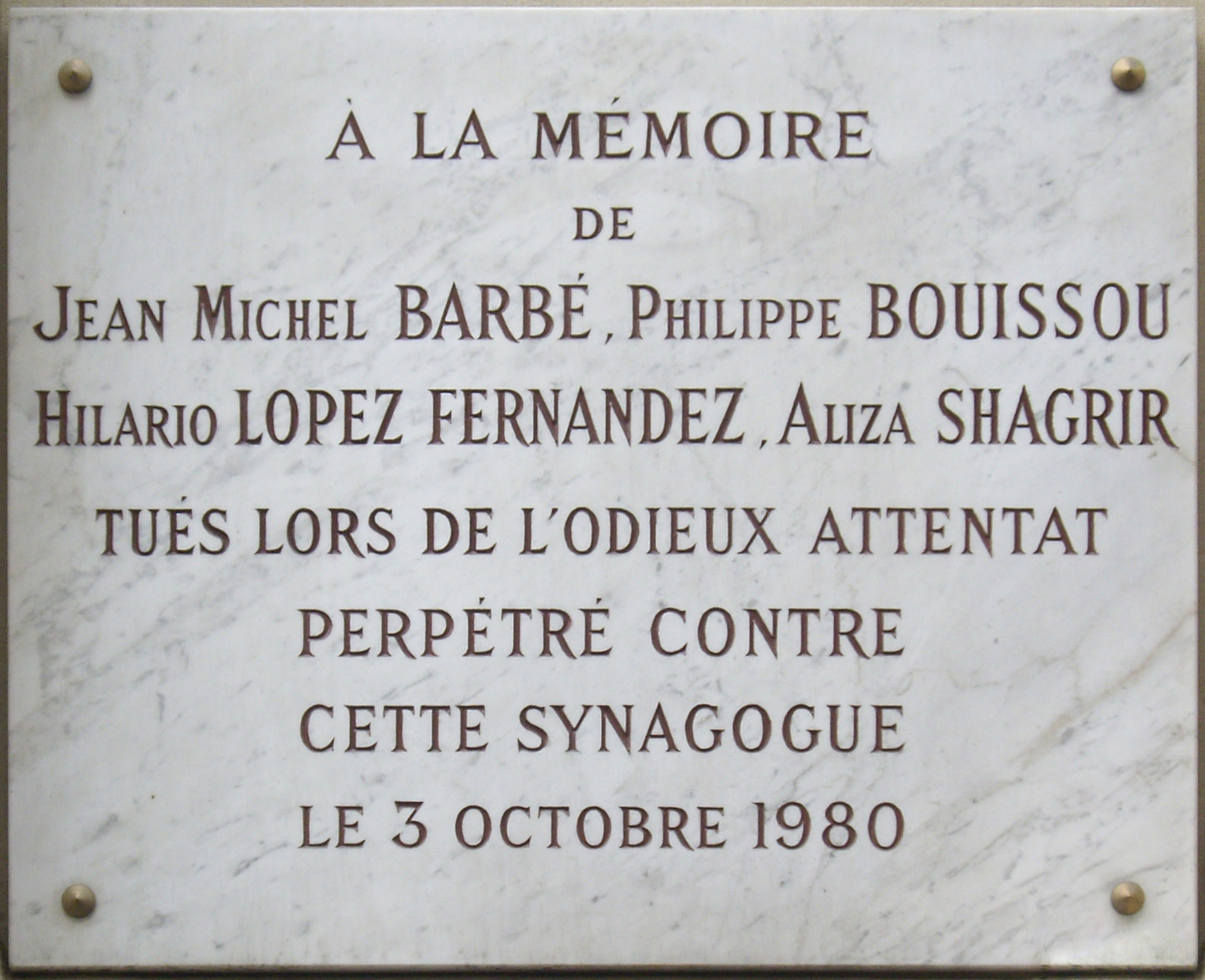
The commemorative plaque fixed onto the synagogue notes: "In memory of Jean Michel Barbé, Philippe Bouissou, Hilario Lopez Fernandez, Aliza Shagrir killed during the odious attack committed against this synagogue on 3 October 1980.

Four people were killed in the blast. Philippe Bouissou (22 years old), passing by on his motorbike, was killed immediately. Aliza Shagrir (44 years old), an Israeli TV presenter on holiday, was killed while she was walking on the pavement outside. Jean-Michel Barbé (41 years old), a driver, was parked outside the synagogue, waiting for clients inside. Hilario Lopes-Fernandez, a Portuguese housekeeper of the Victor Hugo Hotel, located almost in front of the temple, was seriously wounded and died of her injuries two days later. Forty-six people were also injured.

According to investigators, the bomb had been set to detonate after prayers concluded and as worshippers were leaving the building. However, the service had started several minutes late and therefore there were few people in the vicinity of the bomb.

== Reactions ==
=== Public reaction ===
After the attack, there was widespread criticism of the French government. For three days after the attacks, tens of thousands of people, including Jews, non-Jews, trade unionists and politicians, marched along the Champs-Élysées and in the vicinity of the Élysée Palace in protest of the attack. The night of the bombing, demonstrations began at the Charles de Gaulle–Étoile metro station. The next morning, over 10,000 people gathered at the synagogue in support. Simone Veil, then President of the European Parliament, participated in the solidarity marches. Still, the crowd's anger at her perceived support for the government forced riot police to take her to safety.

In solidarity with the Jewish community, France's two major trade unions, the General Confederation of Labour (CGT) and the French Democratic Confederation of Labour (CFDT), called for a nationwide strike on 7 October.

=== Jewish community's response ===
The Jewish community's immediate reaction was one of anger. Many Jews blamed the government of President Valéry Giscard d'Estaing, which they perceived as too soft on Palestinian terrorists and far-right extremism. On 5 October, Jewish demonstrators attempted to storm the Élysée Palace and the Ministry of the Interior, clashing with riot police. Passers-by with an apparent neo-Nazi appearance were harassed or beaten.

New York City Mayor Ed Koch, who was Jewish, accused Giscard of "delivering the Jews to the PLO," similar to how Vichy France delivered Jews to the Nazis.

=== Law enforcement response ===
The government subsequently announced a series of measures to protect Jewish institutions. Two hundred police cars and three riot police companies (a total of 600 police officers) were assigned to protect the Jewish community across France. In Paris, riot police were stationed in front of every synagogue. In Strasbourg, authorities closed the street in front of the city's synagogue to vehicular traffic.

=== Raymond Barre controversy ===
The night of the attack, Prime Minister Raymond Barre said to French television station TF1: "This odious attack was aimed at hitting Israelites going to the synagogue but hit innocent French people who crossed the Copernic street". His words of 8 October in the National Assembly, assuring his "Jewish compatriots" of the "sympathy of the all nation," failed to assuage. Just before his death in August 2007, Raymond Barre blamed the controversy about his statement on the "Jewish lobby."

=== Effect on the 1981 presidential election ===
Long-simmering dissatisfaction from the increasingly vocal 700,000-person Jewish community in France about the anti-Israel tilt of Giscard's policies and his government's tepid response to the synagogue bombing may have contributed to his loss in the 1981 presidential election. Giscard won a majority of the Jewish vote in his campaign during the 1974 presidential election, which he won by only 340,000 votes. But a few months after his election, he dispatched his Foreign Minister Jean Sauvagnargues to meet with Palestine Liberation Organization leader Yasir Arafat. Giscard also approved the opening of a PLO bureau in Paris. In 1977, his government approved the release of Palestinian militant Abu Daoud, the mastermind of the 1972 Munich massacre.

In the 1981 election, a majority of Jewish voters went for François Mitterrand of the Socialist Party, who won in the second round.

== Responsibility ==
Several potential suspects were investigated, including Spanish neo-Nazis, Libyans, Palestinian nationalists, and the French extreme right.

=== False neo-Nazi claim ===
Within hours of the bombing, a man claiming to represent the neo-Nazi Federation of National and European Action (FANE) called the Agence France-Presse to claim responsibility on behalf of the FANE. However, Jean-Yves Pellay, a 25-year-old who claimed to be Jewish, later confessed to claiming to "get the neo-Nazis in trouble with the law".

One year after the bombing, investigators had failed to identify any perpetrators. Police initially sought two Cypriot suspects, Alexander Panadryu and Joseph Mathias, but the investigation did not progress at the time. It was alleged that five Palestinians had travelled to France under forged Cypriot passports.

French investigators later attributed the attack to the Palestinian militant group Popular Front for the Liberation of Palestine.

=== Hassan Diab ===
==== Arrest and extradition ====
Twenty-eight years after the bombing, the Royal Canadian Mounted Police arrested university professor Hassan Diab, a Canadian of Lebanese descent, based on a request from French authorities. Diab reportedly matched a drawing of the suspected bomber created from a hotel witness. He was formally charged with the attack in November 2014, after his extradition from Canada.

According to groups such as Amnesty International, the British Columbia Civil Liberties Association, and the Canadian Civil Liberties Association, there are university records that prove that Diab was in Beirut, Lebanon, at the time of the bombing.

A French court dismissed the charges against Diab on 12 January 2018 due to insufficient evidence. According to Mondoweiss, two senior French investigative judges found evidence supporting his alibi that he was in Beirut at the time of the bombing. He returned to Canada on 15 January. However, on 19 May 2021, the Court of Cassation upheld the earlier decision, directing Diab to stand trial in France.

==== Trial ====
Diab's trial, which has been controversial, began in Paris on 6 April 2023. The trial was held in absentia; Diab remained in Canada after his release in 2018 and did not return to France for the prosecution.

After a three-week trial, Diab was declared guilty of the murders on 21 April. The Cour d'assises sentenced him to life imprisonment. The prosecution's case rested largely on intelligence reports and a passport allegedly used by Diab to travel to Spain, from where the PFLP was said to have launched the attack. The prosecution argued that a copy of the passport contained entry and exit stamps from Spain around the time of the attack. Diab's defence insisted that there was no material evidence linking him to the crime. He had previously reported the loss of his passport. Despite the verdict, it is unclear whether Canada will extradite Diab.

==== Reactions ====
The leader of France's Jewish umbrella organisation, the Conseil Représentatif des Institutions juives de France, welcomed the conviction. Amnesty International called the case "baseless and flawed."
