= Finance Tower =

Skyscraper in Brussels, Belgium

- Tour des Finances (French); Financietoren (Dutch)
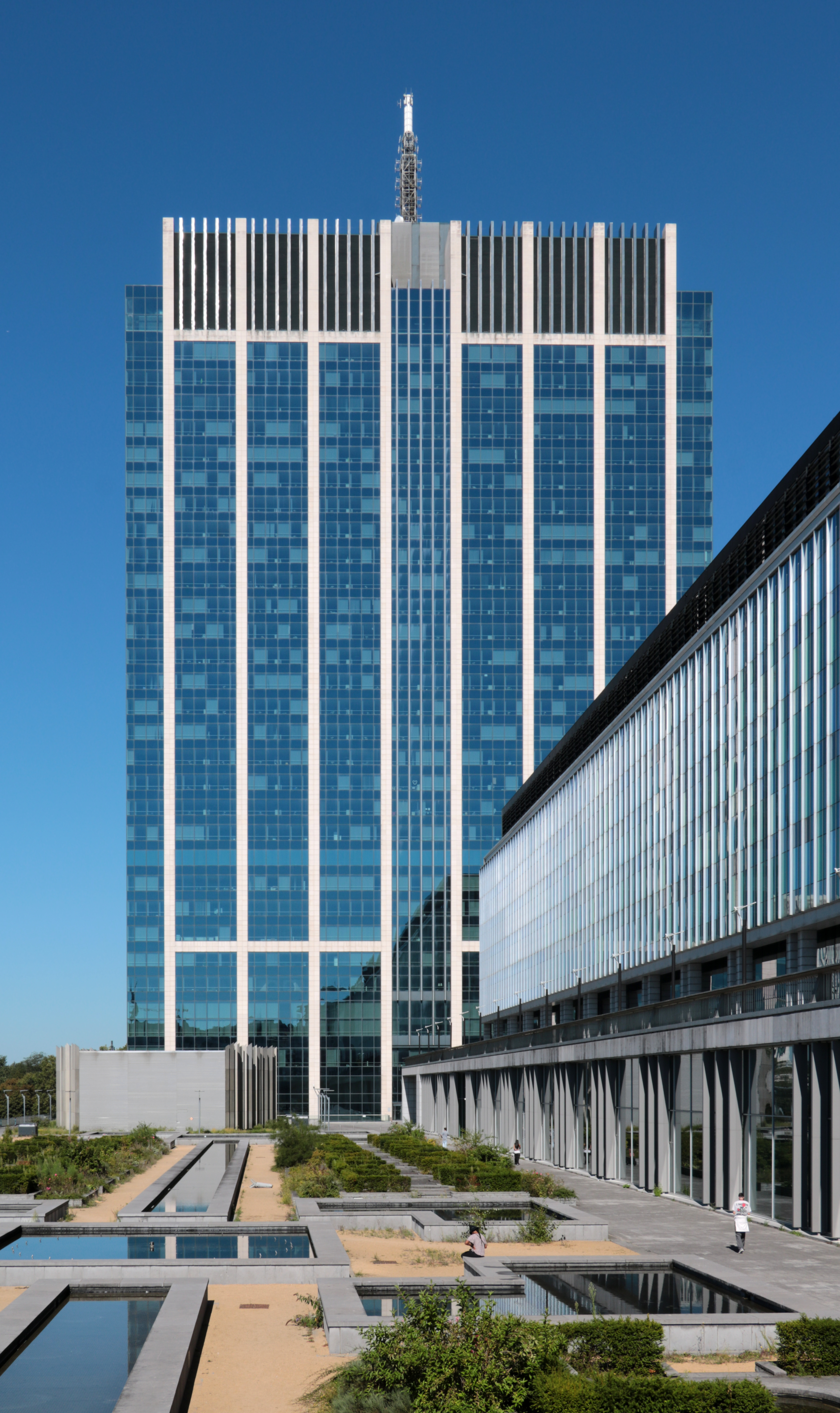
- The Finance Tower seen from the State Administrative Centre

General information
- Status: Completed
- Type: Office building
- Location: Boulevard du Jardin botanique / Kruidtuinlaan 50, 1000 City of Brussels, Brussels-Capital Region, Belgium
- Coordinates: 50°51′10″N 4°21′52″E
- Construction started: 1968
- Completed: 1982
- Renovated: 2005–2008

Height
- Antenna spire: 174 m (571 ft)
- Roof: 145 m (476 ft)

Technical details
- Floor count: 36
- Floor area: 220,000 m^{2} (2,400,000 sq ft)

Design and construction
- Architects: Hugo Van Kuyck, Marcel Lambrichs and Léon Stynen

The Finance Tower (French: Tour des Finances; Dutch: Financietoren) is a skyscraper in the Northern Quarter central business district of Brussels, Belgium. It was designed by the architects Hugo Van Kuyck, Marcel Lambrichs and Léon Stynen and built between 1968 and 1982. The height of the building is 145 metres (476 ft), and it has 36 floors. It is the second tallest building in Belgium after the South Tower, and has the most office space of any building in Belgium.

The Finance Tower is situated to the crossroads of the Boulevard du Jardin botanique/Kruidtuinlaan and the Rue Royale/Koningsstraat. It is served by many public transit systems, including Botanique/Kruidtuin metro station and Brussels-Central and Brussels-North railway stations.

== History ==
=== Purpose ===
The Finance Tower is part of a wider body: the State Administrative Centre (French: Cité administrative de l'État or CAE, Dutch: Rijksadministratief Centrum or RAC), a complex in the International Style whose objective was to group together the country's public administration in order to increase productivity and to reduce the functioning wastes. The site was preferred because of its ease of access, most notably with the proximity of Brussels-Central railway station. On top of this, the works of the North–South connection made the neighbourhood lifeless, and it was necessary to recreate a liaison between the upper and lower city.

=== Construction ===
The tower is located on a site with a 13-metre (43 ft) difference between the highest and lowest altitudes. Producing the preliminary documents took nearly four years, from 1968 to 1972. Searches were performed down to a depth of 26 metres (85 ft). The building of the foundations was made difficult by the presence of a water-logged clay terrain as well as by the tunnel of the North–South connection.

Budget restrictions slowed down the construction; work was practically paralysed from 1974 to 1978. The works resumed in 1978. Major work was finally finished in February 1981, but it was the end of 1983 before the tower at last opened its doors. Its external elevator core was intended to have had a marble façade, but this was scrapped because of the high cost.

=== Renovation (2005–2008) ===
The Finance Tower underwent a major renovation between January 2005 and 2008, planned by Maurice Mottle architects. The old façade was replaced with a light blue and white curtain wall, asbestos was removed, the external lift shaft was dismantled, and new lifts were built inside the building. The lost office space was compensated for by a new 11-storey building constructed to the east of the tower. The renovated building provides office space for 4,600 workers, an increase from the 3,200 prior to renovation.

The antenna, which is mounted on top of the tower, serves the two Belgian national television stations and is used only for digital broadcast.

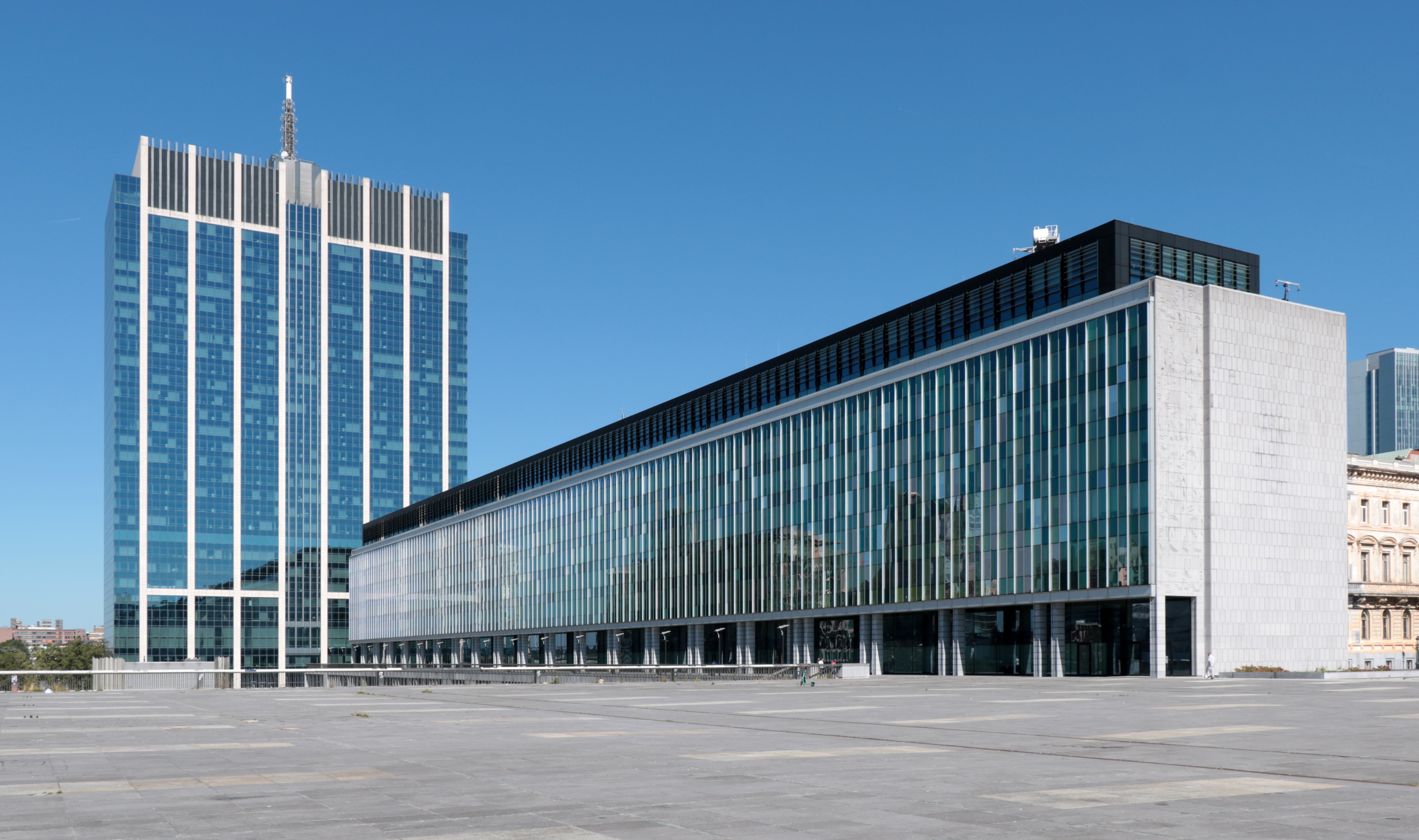
The Finance Tower and the State Administrative Centre

== Art ==
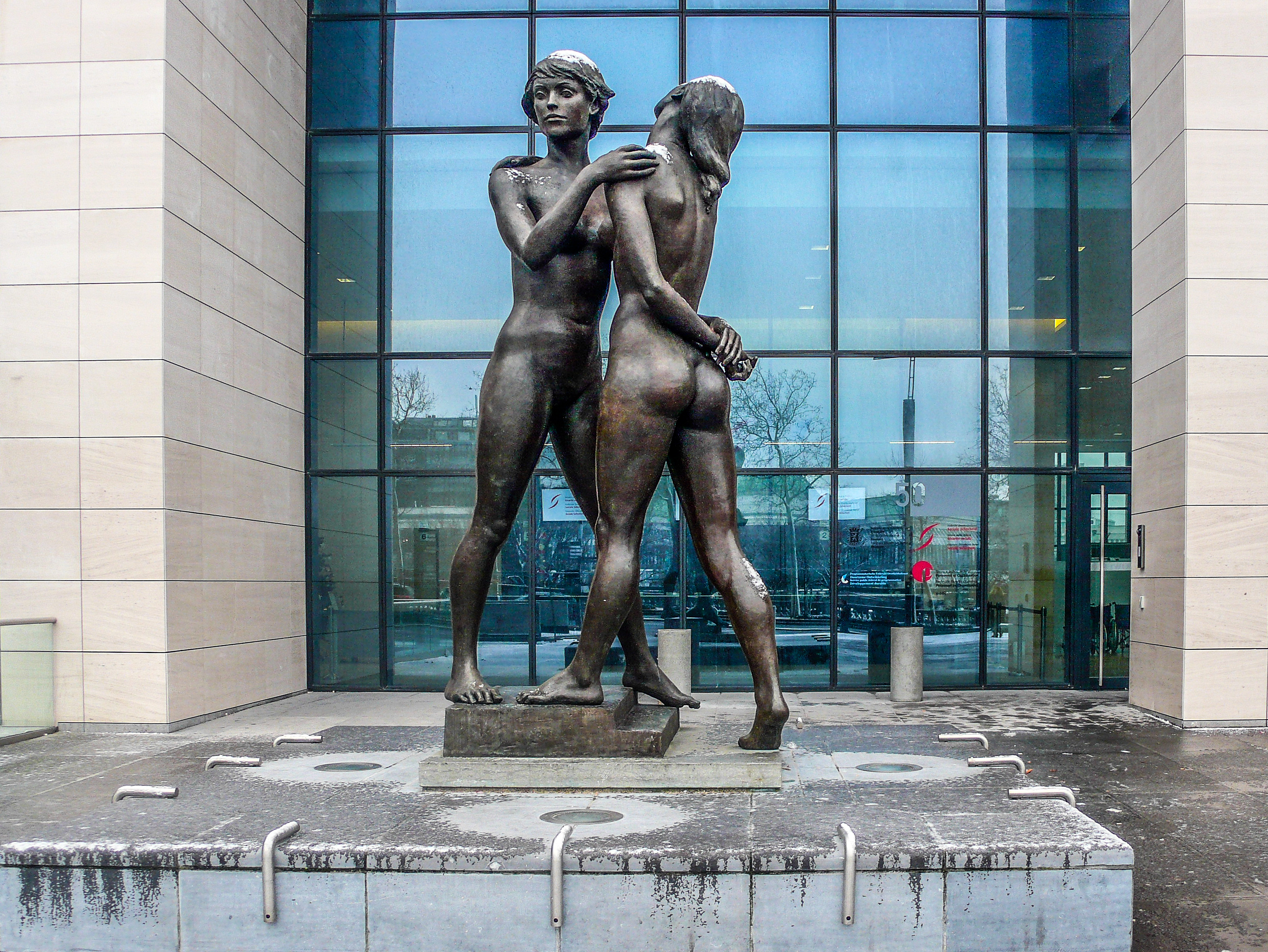
L'Âme Sentinelle (Neujean, 1982–1984)

Right in front of the Finance Tower is the sculpture L'Âme Sentinelle by Nat Neujean, depicting two females embracing. In individualistic Belgian fashion, this is rather an evocative and erotically themed sculpture. One of the two women is more classically feminine in appearance, the other looks more like a man, though one quickly sees she also is female. The pose is enigmatic, with the shorter-haired woman firmly grasping the wrist of the longer-haired woman behind her back, almost wrestling her into submission, while both look away from each other despite being nude and intimate.

== See also ==
- Astro Tower
- North Galaxy Towers
- Madou Plaza Tower
- Proximus Towers
- Rogier Tower
- World Trade Center (Brussels)
