= Rogier Tower =

Skyscraper in Brussels, Belgium

- Tour Rogier (French); Rogiertoren (Dutch)
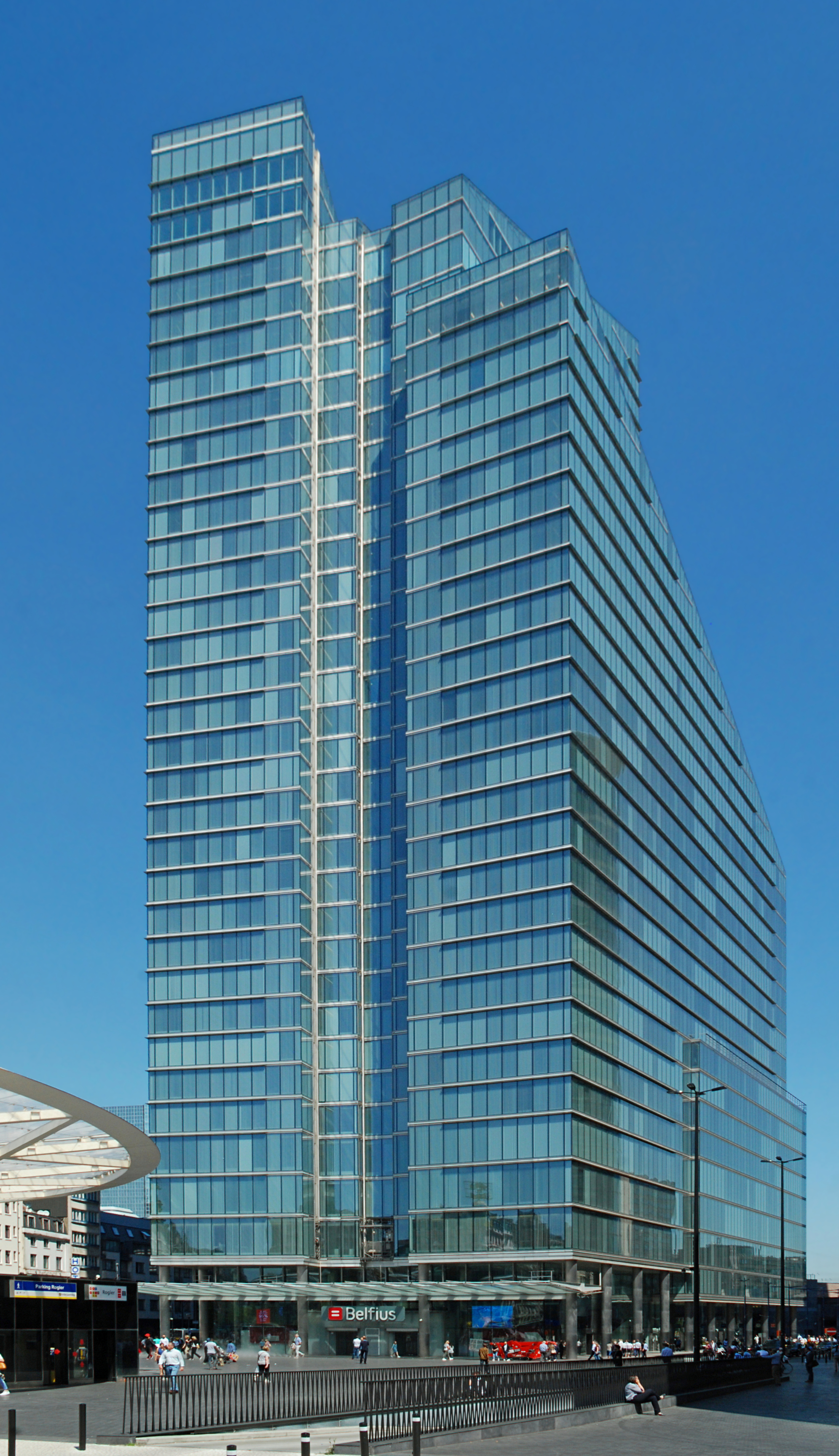
- The Rogier Tower seen from the Place Charles Rogier/Karel Rogierplein
- Interactive map of the Rogier Tower area
- Former names: Dexia Tower, Belfius Tower

General information
- Status: Completed
- Type: Office building
- Location: Place Charles Rogier / Karel Rogierplein 11, 1210 Saint-Josse-ten-Noode, Brussels-Capital Region, Belgium
- Coordinates: 50°51′23″N 4°21′33″E
- Construction started: 2002
- Completed: 2006
- Opening: 21 November 2006

Height
- Roof: 137 m (449 ft)

Technical details
- Floor count: 38
- Floor area: 111,903 m^{2} (1,204,510 sq ft)

Design and construction
- Architects: Philippe Samyn and Partners, Michel Jaspers & Partners

The Rogier Tower (French: Tour Rogier; Dutch: Rogiertoren) is a skyscraper in the Northern Quarter central business district of Brussels, Belgium. It owes its name to the Place Charles Rogier/Karel Rogierplein on which it is situated. It is the fifth tallest building in Belgium.

The tower was formerly known as the Dexia Tower (French: Tour Dexia; Dutch: Dexiatoren) after Dexia bank, but that bank failed due to the 2008 financial crisis and the tower's name was changed in 2012. As Dexia moved its offices in Brussels to the Bastion Tower in Ixelles, Belfius and its subsidiaries are the only occupants of this tower, and it is thus often also called the Belfius Tower (French: Tour Belfius; Dutch: Belfiustoren).

== Description ==
The Rogier Tower was built on the site of the Rogier International Centre (French: Centre international Rogier, Dutch: Internationaal Rogiercentrum), also called the Martini Tower, which was formerly the tallest building in Belgium, but was demolished in 2001. Constructed between 2002 and 2006, the Rogier Tower is 137 metres (449 ft) tall. It was originally planned to be 179 metres (587 ft) tall, but the proposal was rejected because the height was thought to be excessive.

The Rogier Tower is one of the few towers in Brussels whose roof is not horizontal, instead being made up of three inclined sections. It is also one of the only towers in the world to have a fully glass roof.

== Lighting ==
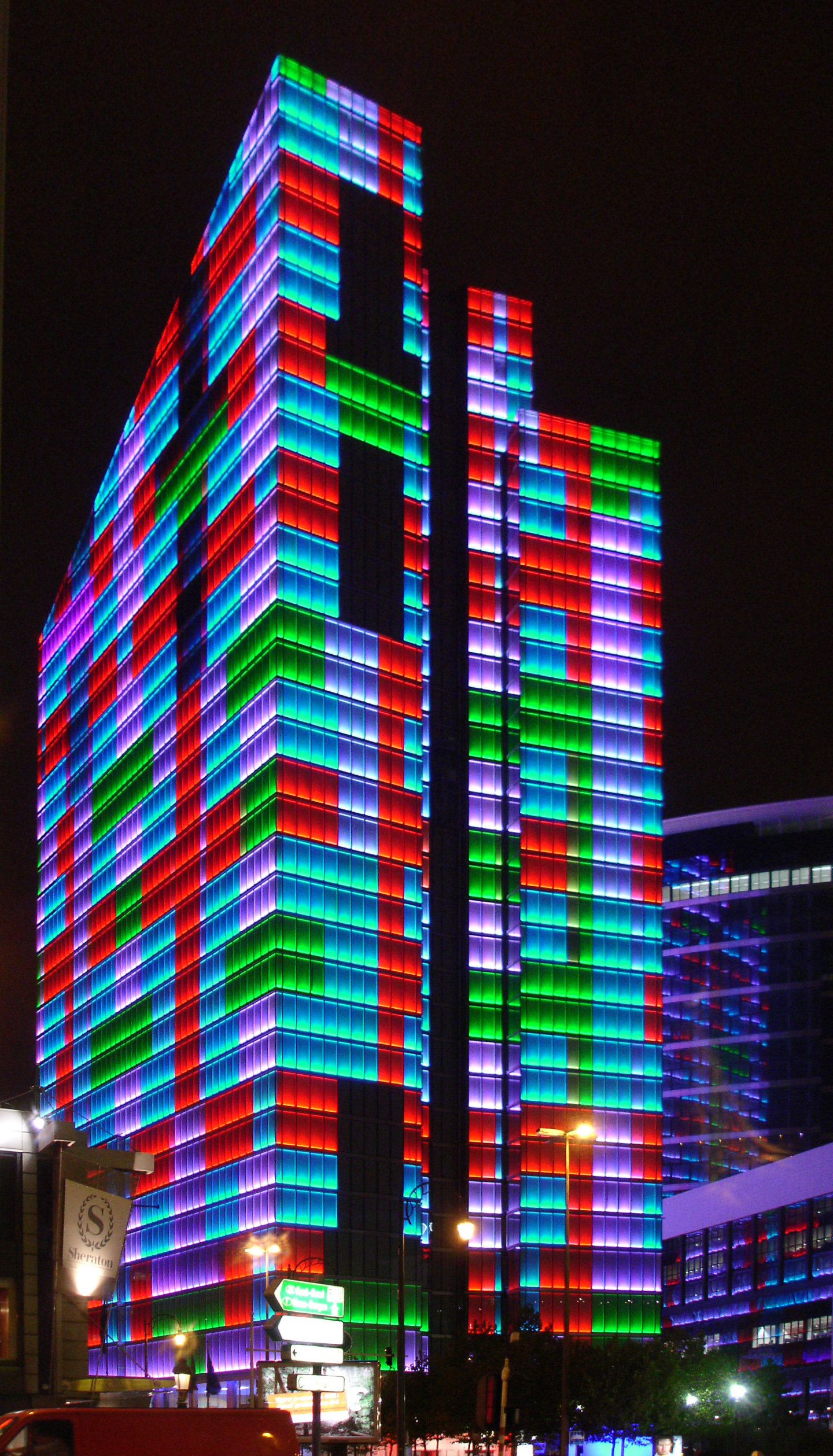
The Rogier Tower from the south during a light show

The building has 6,000 windows, and 4,200 of these are equipped with an average of 12 light bulbs, each having a red, green and blue LED, allowing a broad palette of colours to be formed. These are lit up to form colourful displays, with each window acting as a pixel. To minimise power consumption, the LEDs only illuminate the outside of the closed blinds, and the reflection off the blinds illuminates the window.

Initially, the displays were just abstract patterns or the temperature, but on special occasions and major holidays, customised displays were shown. Following the late-2000s recession, the lighting was greatly reduced, and the displays were on for only 10 minutes an hour. As from 2015, Belfius reactivated the lighting, especially for special occasions such as the Belgian Pride, the Special Olympics, the Olympic Games, Rode Neuzen Dag (Red Nose Day), Viva for Life or the Belgian National Day on 21 July. Belfius was involved in several of these occasions as sponsor or as co-organiser.

== See also ==
- Astro Tower
- Finance Tower
- North Galaxy Towers
- Madou Plaza Tower
- Proximus Towers
- World Trade Center (Brussels)
