= Proximus Towers =

Twin skyscrapers in Brussels, Belgium

- Tours Proximus (French); Proximustorens (Dutch)
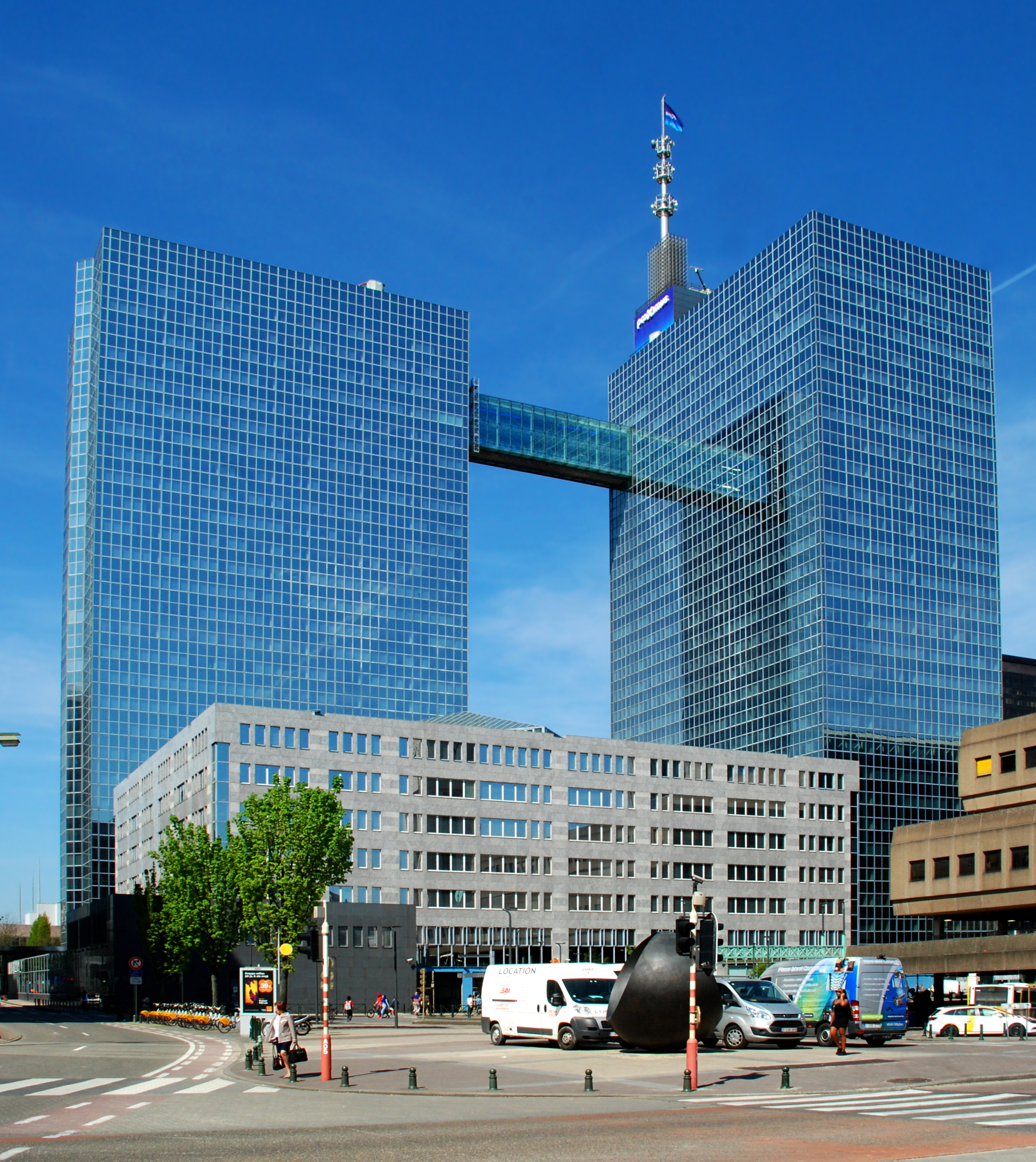
- The Proximus Towers seen from the Place du Nord/Noordplein
- Former names: Belgacom Towers

General information
- Status: Completed
- Type: Office buildings
- Location: Boulevard du Roi Albert II / Koning Albert II-laan 27, 1210 Saint-Josse-ten-Noode, Brussels-Capital Region, Belgium
- Coordinates: 50°51′35″N 4°21′30″E
- Construction started: 1991
- Completed: 1994

Height
- Roof: 102 m (335 ft)

Technical details
- Floor count: 32
- Floor area: 101,200 m^{2} (1,089,000 sq ft)

The Proximus Towers (French: Tours Proximus; Dutch: Proximustorens) are twin skyscrapers on the Boulevard du Roi Albert II/Koning Albert II-laan in the Northern Quarter central business district of Brussels, Belgium. The buildings take their name from the telecommunications company Proximus. They were formerly known as the Belgacom Towers (French: Tours Belgacom; Dutch: Belgacomtorens) before the company's name change.

The towers are both 102 metres (335 ft) tall to the roof, making them some of the tallest buildings in Belgium, and Tower 1 has a spire reaching 134 metres (440 ft) high with a Belgian flag mounted on top. The two towers are linked by a 30-metre-long (98 ft) glass skyway between the 25th and 26th floors of each building.

The towers were originally conceived as part of an eight-building Brussels World Trade Center (WTC) complex, but were splintered off into a separate project. The construction of the towers began in 1991 and was completed in 1994.

== See also ==
- Astro Tower
- Finance Tower
- Madou Plaza Tower
- North Galaxy Towers
- Rogier Tower
- World Trade Center (Brussels)
