= World Trade Center (Brussels) =

Complex of skyscrapers in Brussels, Belgium

World Trade Center (WTC)
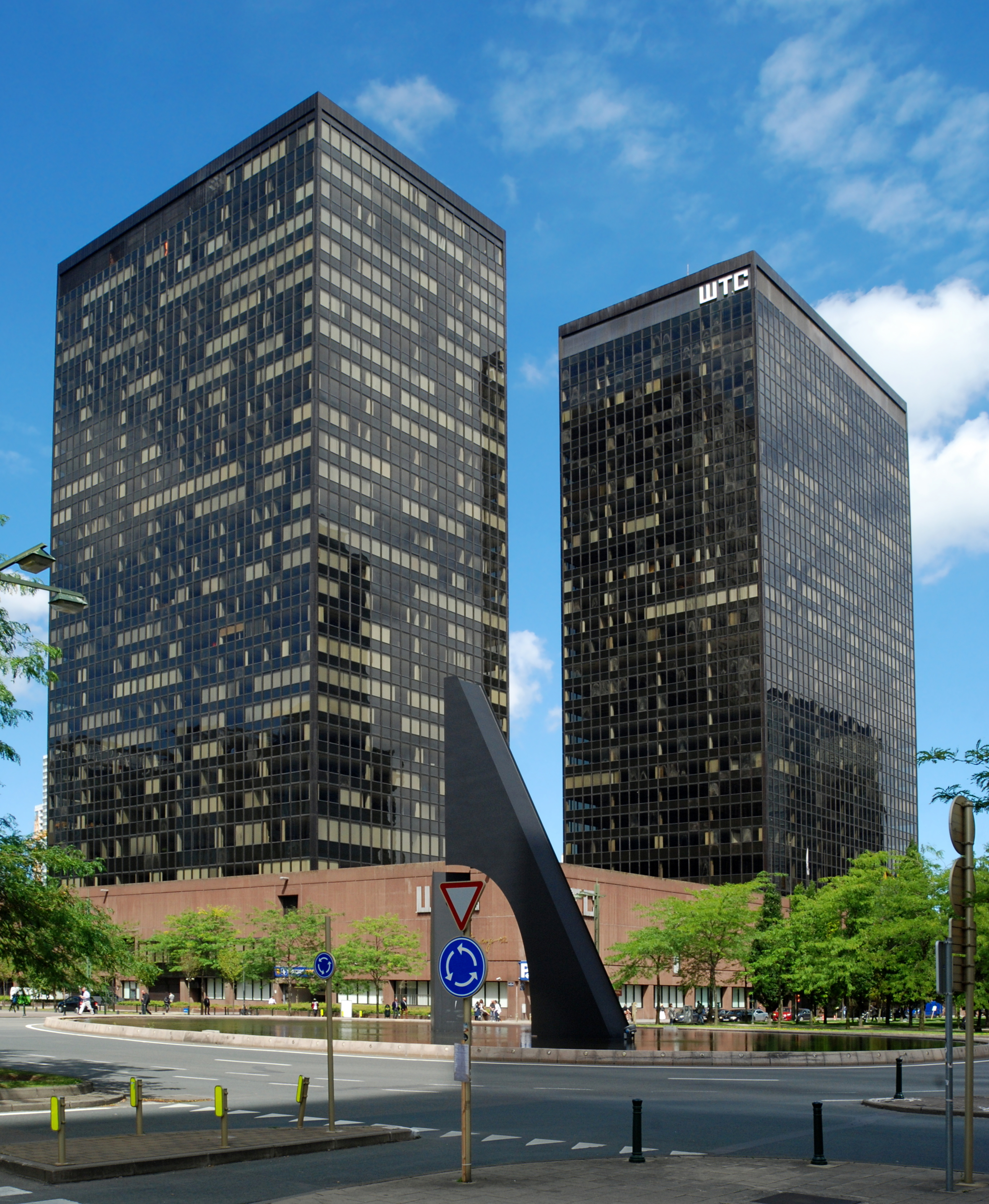
- WTC 1 and 2 seen from the Boulevard du Roi Albert II/Koning Albert II-laan
- Interactive map of the World Trade Center (WTC) area

General information
- Status: Completed
- Type: Office buildings
- Location: Boulevard du Roi Albert II / Koning Albert II-laan 28–30, 1000 City of Brussels, Brussels-Capital Region, Belgium
- Coordinates: 50°51′40″N 4°21′25″E
- Completed: 1972 (WTC 1); 1976 (WTC 2); 1983 (WTC 3)

Height
- Roof: 102 m (335 ft) (WTC 1 and 2); 105 m (344 ft) (WTC 3)

Technical details
- Floor count: 28 (all 3)

The World Trade Center (WTC) is a complex of skyscrapers at the corner of the Boulevard du Roi Albert II/Koning Albert II-laan and the Boulevard Simon Bolivar/Simon Bolivarlaan in the Northern Quarter central business district of Brussels, Belgium. Its three towers are among the tallest buildings in Belgium.

The complex was originally planned to have eight towers, all around the corner of the Boulevard du Roi Albert II and the Boulevard Simon Bolivar. The two of these at the south-eastern corner of the intersection became the Proximus Towers and the two at the north-east the North Galaxy Towers. Of the remaining four, two were built in the 1970s, one was built across the street in the 1980s, and the fourth was never built.

In response to the 11 September 2001 attacks on the United States, hundreds of Belgians formed a hand-in-hand human chain around the Trade Center in tribute.

== Gallery ==
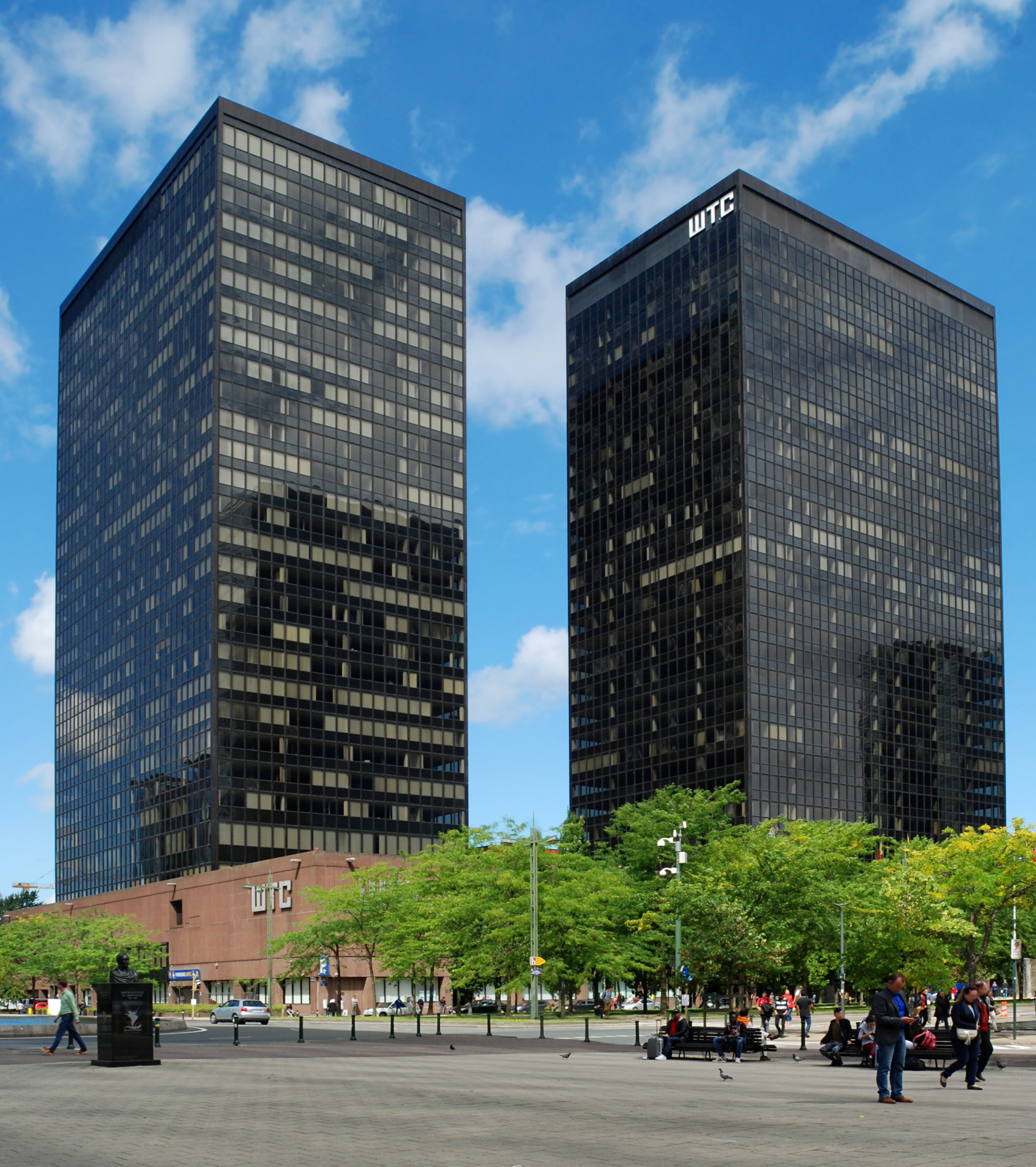
WTC 1 and 2

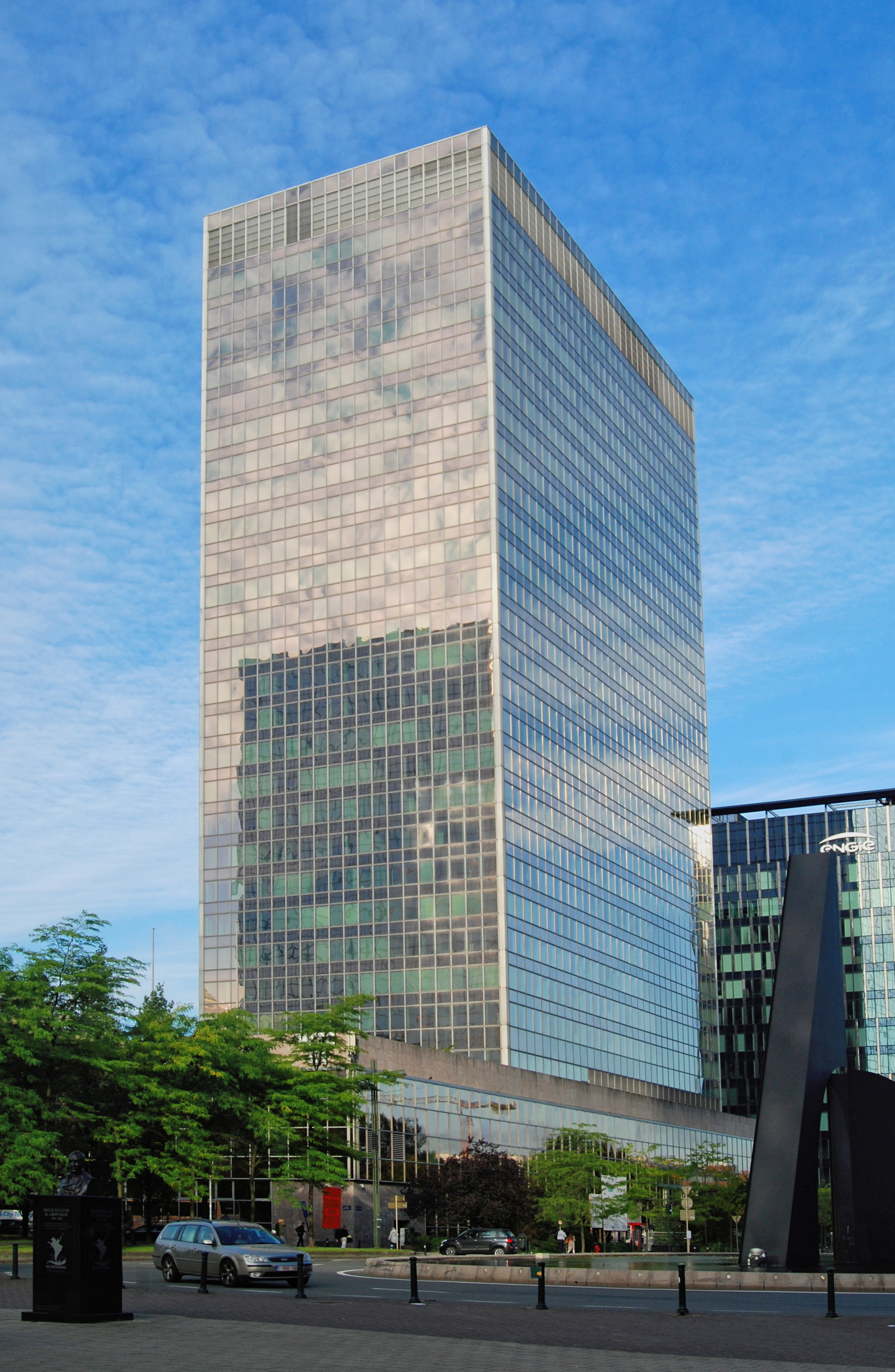
WTC 3

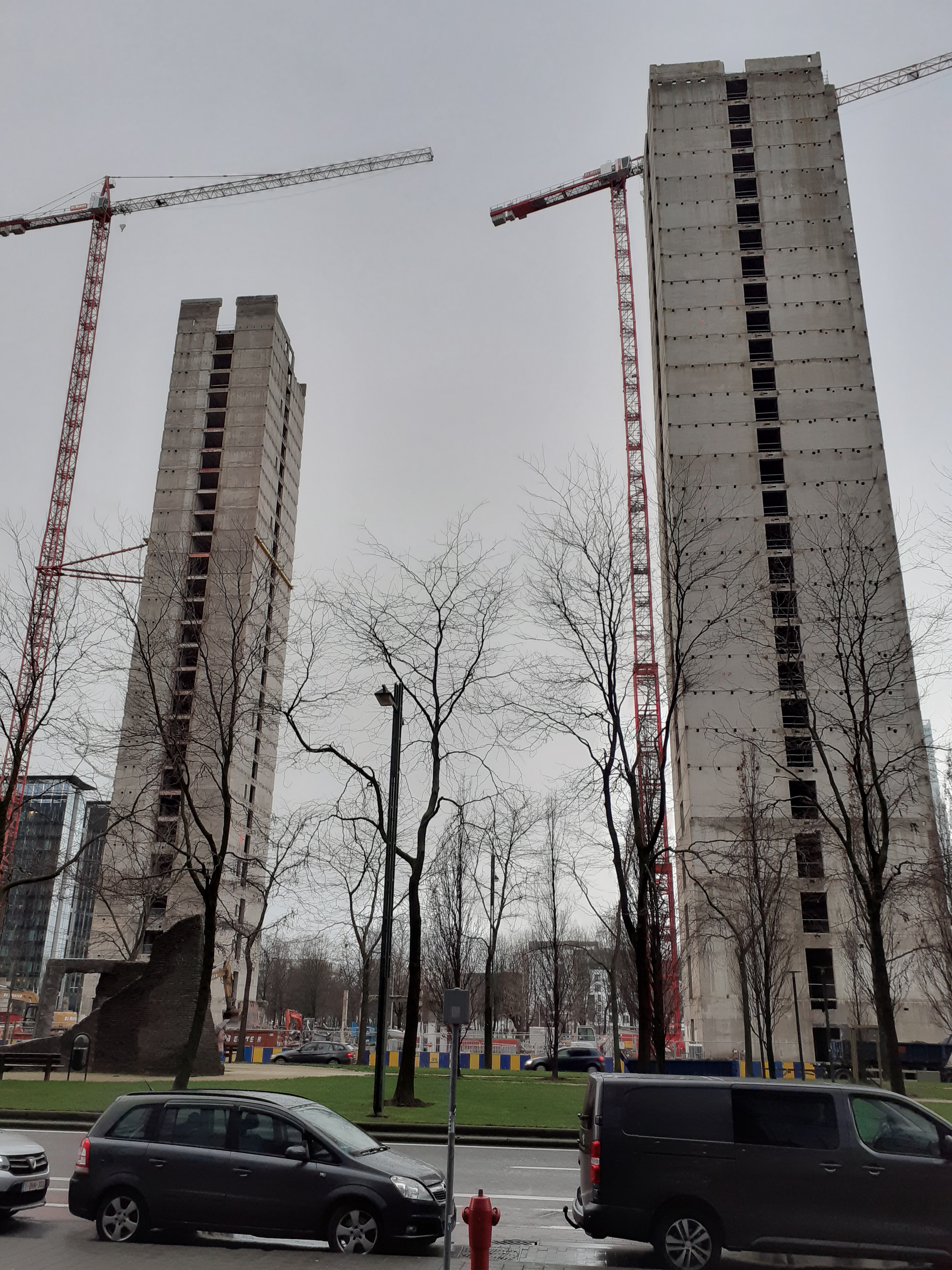
WTC 1 and 2 in early 2021 during their reconstruction

== See also ==
- Astro Tower
- Finance Tower
- North Galaxy Towers
- Madou Plaza Tower
- Proximus Towers
- Rogier Tower
