= Place Charles Rogier =

Square in Brussels, Belgium

Place Charles Rogier (French); Karel Rogierplein (Dutch)
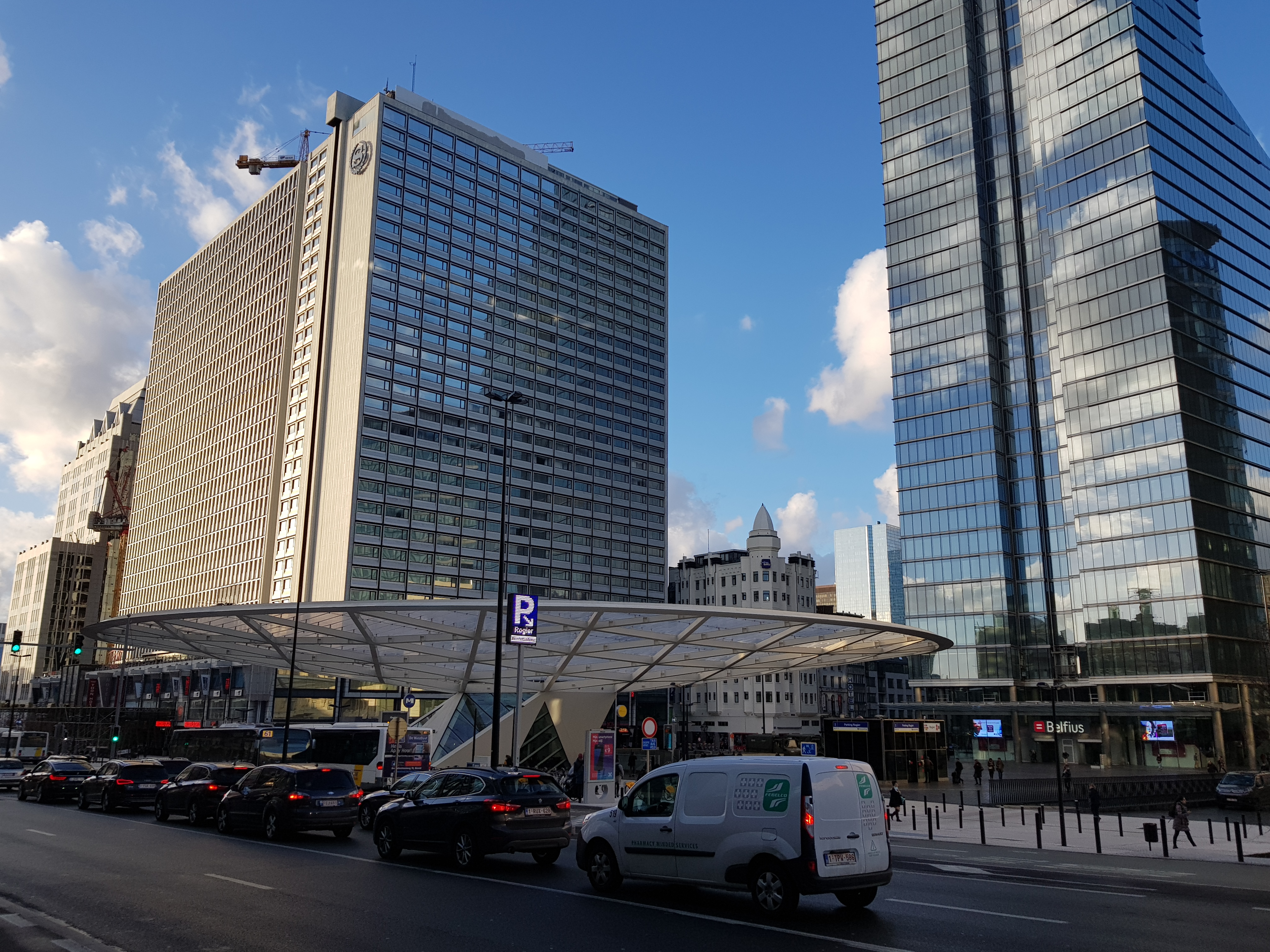
- The Place Charles Rogier/Karel Rogierplein in Brussels

- Location within Brussels Location within Belgium
- Namesake: Charles Rogier
- Type: Square
- Location: Saint-Josse-ten-Noode, Brussels-Capital Region, Belgium
- Quarter: Northern Quarter
- Postal code: 1210
- Nearest metro station: 2 6 Rogier
- Coordinates: 50°51′20″N 04°21′31″E

The Place Charles Rogier (French, pronounced [plas ʃaʁl ʁɔ.ʒje]) or Karel Rogierplein (Dutch, pronounced [ˈkaːrəl roːˈɣirˌplɛin]), usually shortened to the Place Rogier, or Rogier by locals, is a major square in the Saint-Josse-ten-Noode municipality of Brussels, Belgium. It is named in honour of Charles Rogier, a former Prime Minister of Belgium who played an important political role during the Belgian Revolution of 1830.

The square is located on the transition between Brussels' historic city centre (the Pentagon) and the Northern Quarter business district (also called Little Manhattan), an exponent of modern Brussels. It is an important communication node in the city both in terms of road network and public transport. Many hotels, offices and shops adjoin it. The Rue Neuve/Nieuwstraat, Belgium's second busiest shopping street, also ends there. It is served by the metro and premetro (underground tram) station Rogier on lines 2, 4, 6 and 10.

== History ==
=== Early history ===
The square was originally known as the Place des Nations/Natieplein ("Nations Square") or the Place de Cologne/Keulenplein ("Cologne Square"). In 1885, following the death of the liberal statesman and former Prime Minister of Belgium, Charles Rogier, it was renamed the Place Charles Rogier/Karel Rogierplein ("Charles Rogier Square") in his honour.

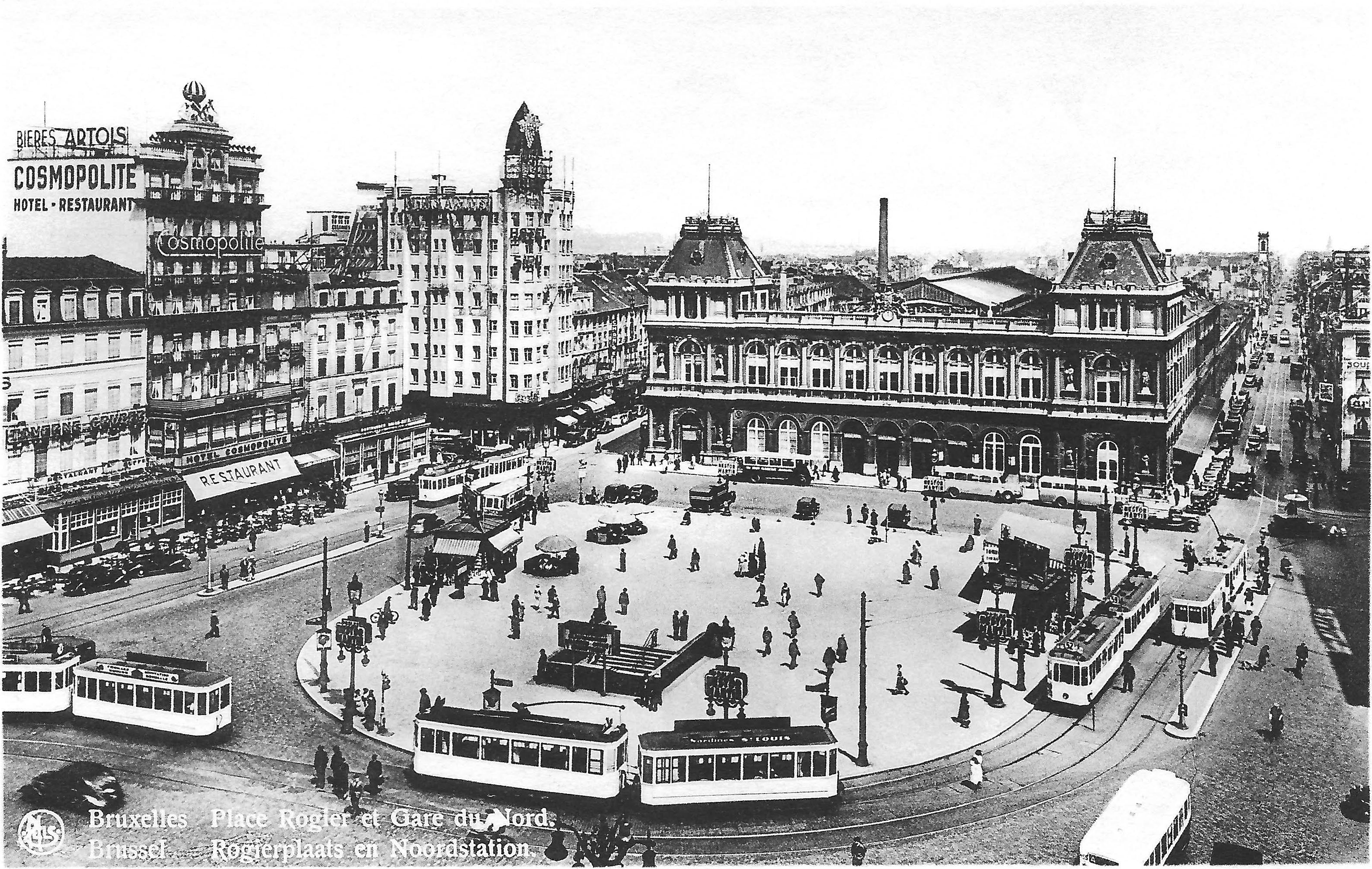
The Place Charles Rogier/Karel Rogierplein in the 1930s

Until 1952, the original Brussels-North railway station was located on the Place Charles Rogier. With the commissioning of the North–South connection, this terminus station was replaced, further north, by the current transit station. The old station building was demolished in 1955. The 117-metre-tall (384 ft) Rogier International Center (French: Centre international Rogier, Dutch: Internationaal Rogiercentrum), also called the Martini Tower, was erected in 1960 on the former site of the station, and housed the National Theatre of Belgium until 1999. The building was demolished in 2001, and replaced by the 137-metre-tall (449 ft) Rogier Tower.

=== Redevelopment (2008–2017) ===
In 2006, the Brussels-Capital Region decided to completely redevelop the square. The renovation lasted from 2008 to 2017, with most of the work carried out between 2013 and 2015. The project was the subject of an international architectural competition, with some of the entrances to the metro station also being opened and renovated.

Above the station, a large parasol-shaped translucent awning was built in 2015 according to plans by the architect Xaveer De Geyter. The construction weighs 200 tonnes (440,000 lb) and has a diameter of 64 metres (210 ft).

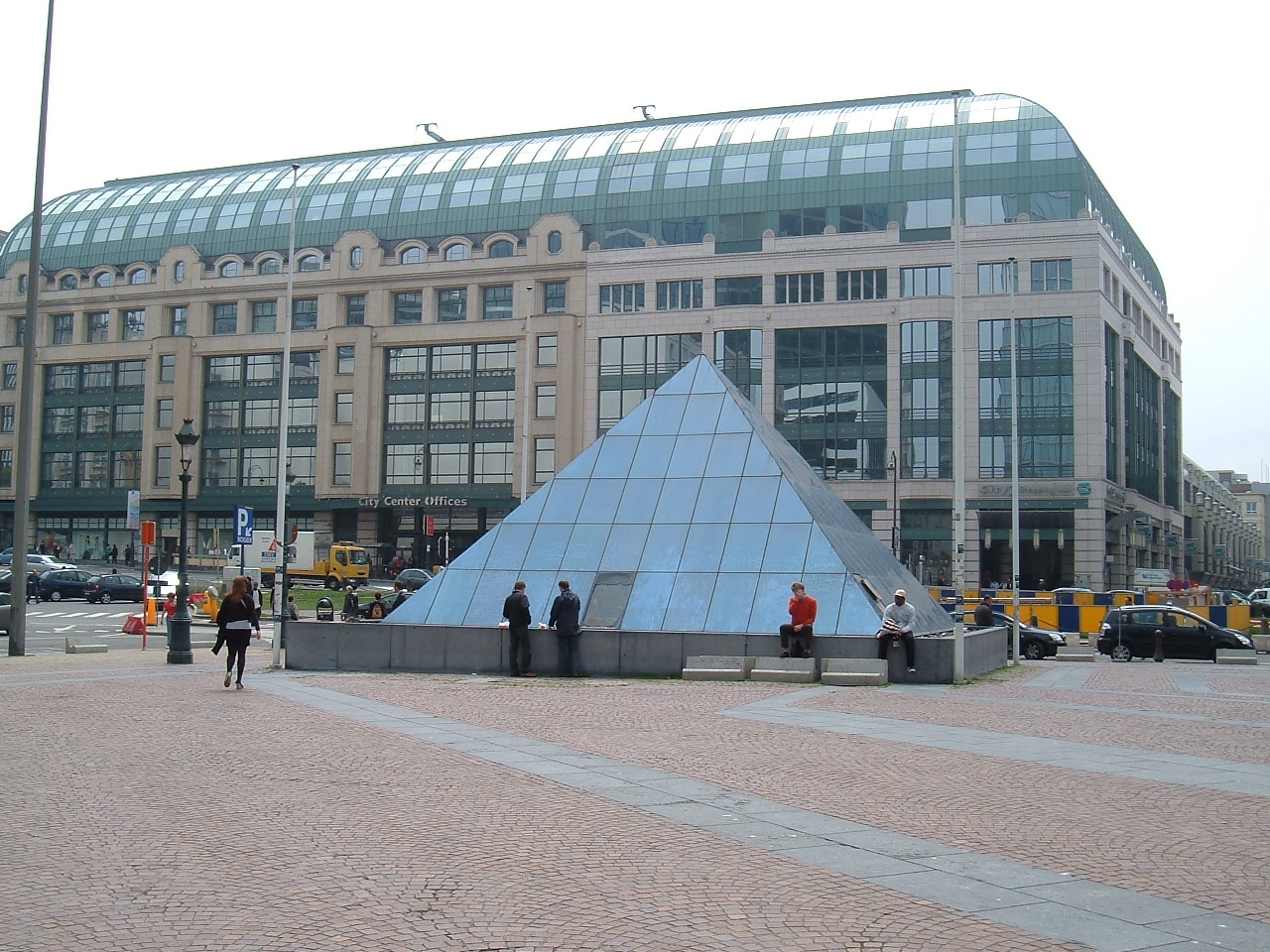
The Place Charles Rogier before renovation, with its glass pyramid

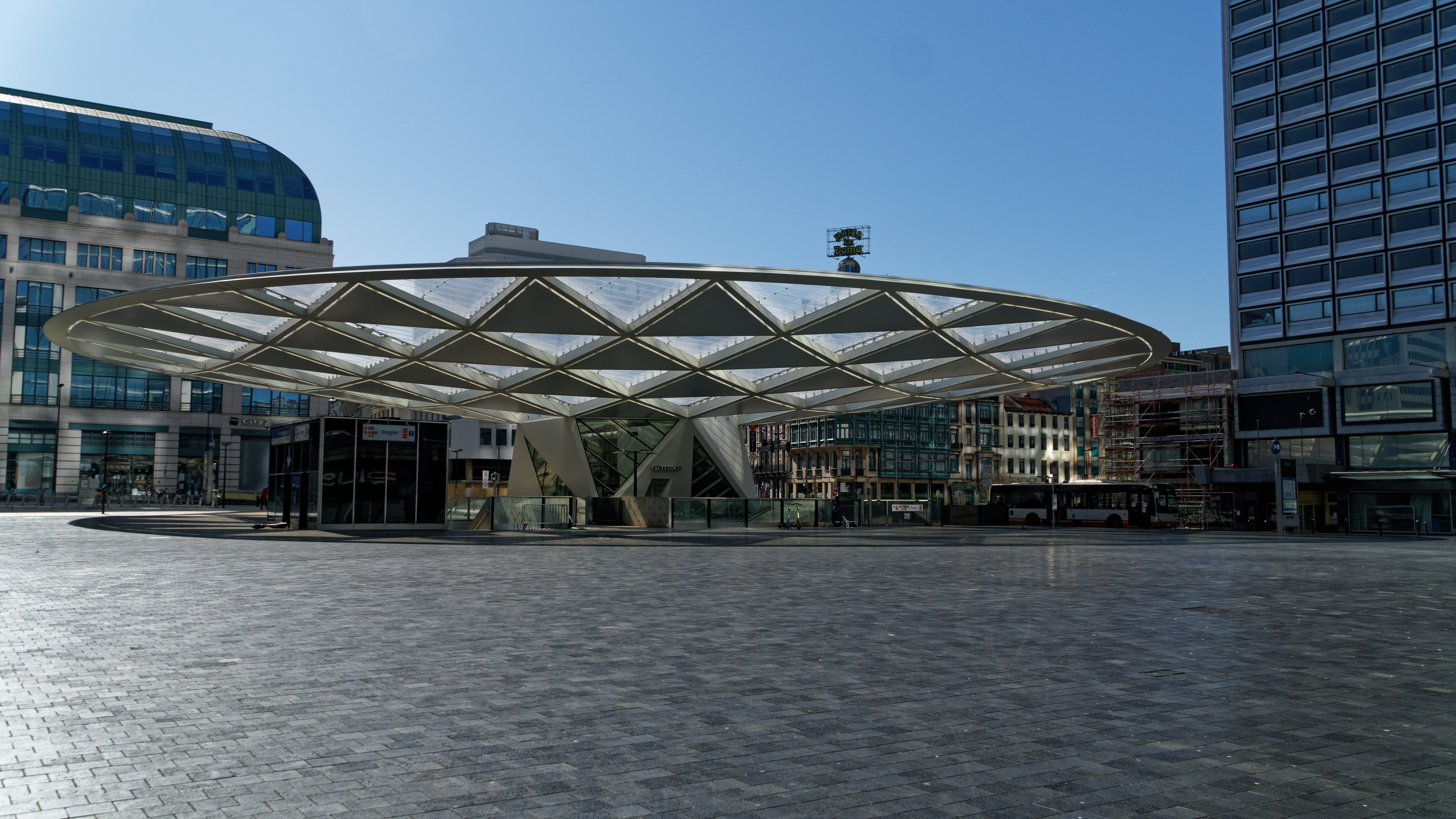
The square as it appears today, with its awning by Xaveer De Geyter

== Location and accessibility ==
The Place Charles Rogier lies at the conjunction of the Avenue du Boulevard/Bolwerklaan to south with two smaller streets on its northern side: the Rue du Progrès/Vooruitgangstraat and the Rue de Brabant/Brabantstraat. Additionally, two sides streets lead into it from the north-west and north-east: the Rue des Croisades/Kruisvaartenstraat and the Rue Saint-Lazare/Sint-Lazarusstraat.

== Notable buildings ==
The Place Charles Rogier is home to an important architectural heritage:

- the Crowne Plaza Brussels - Le Palace (formerly Palace Hôtel) (1909), Art Nouveau hotel by Adhémar Lener
- the Hotel Indigo Brussels - City (formerly Hôtel Albert I) (1929), Art Deco hotel by Michel Polak and Albert Poor
- the Hôtel Siru (1932), Art Deco or early modernist hotel by Marcel Chabot
- the Manhattan Center (1972), functionalist building by Louis Van Hove
- the Rogier Tower (formerly Dexia Tower), completed in 2006 on the site of the Rogier International Center, by Philippe Samyn and Partners and M. & J-M. Jaspers - J. Eyers & Partners
- the Covent Garden (2004–2007), postmodern building by Henri Montois
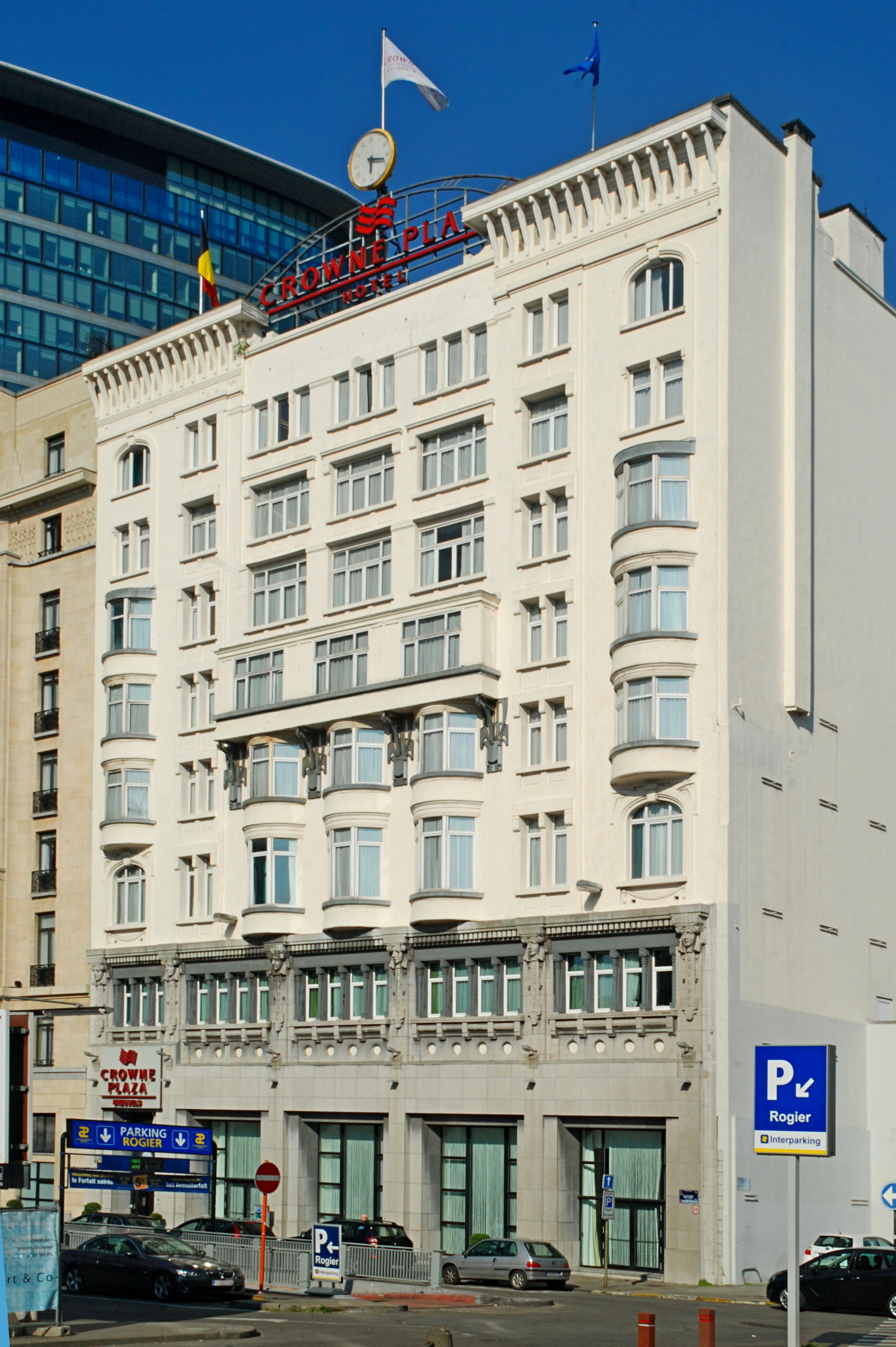
Palace Hôtel (Lener, 1909)

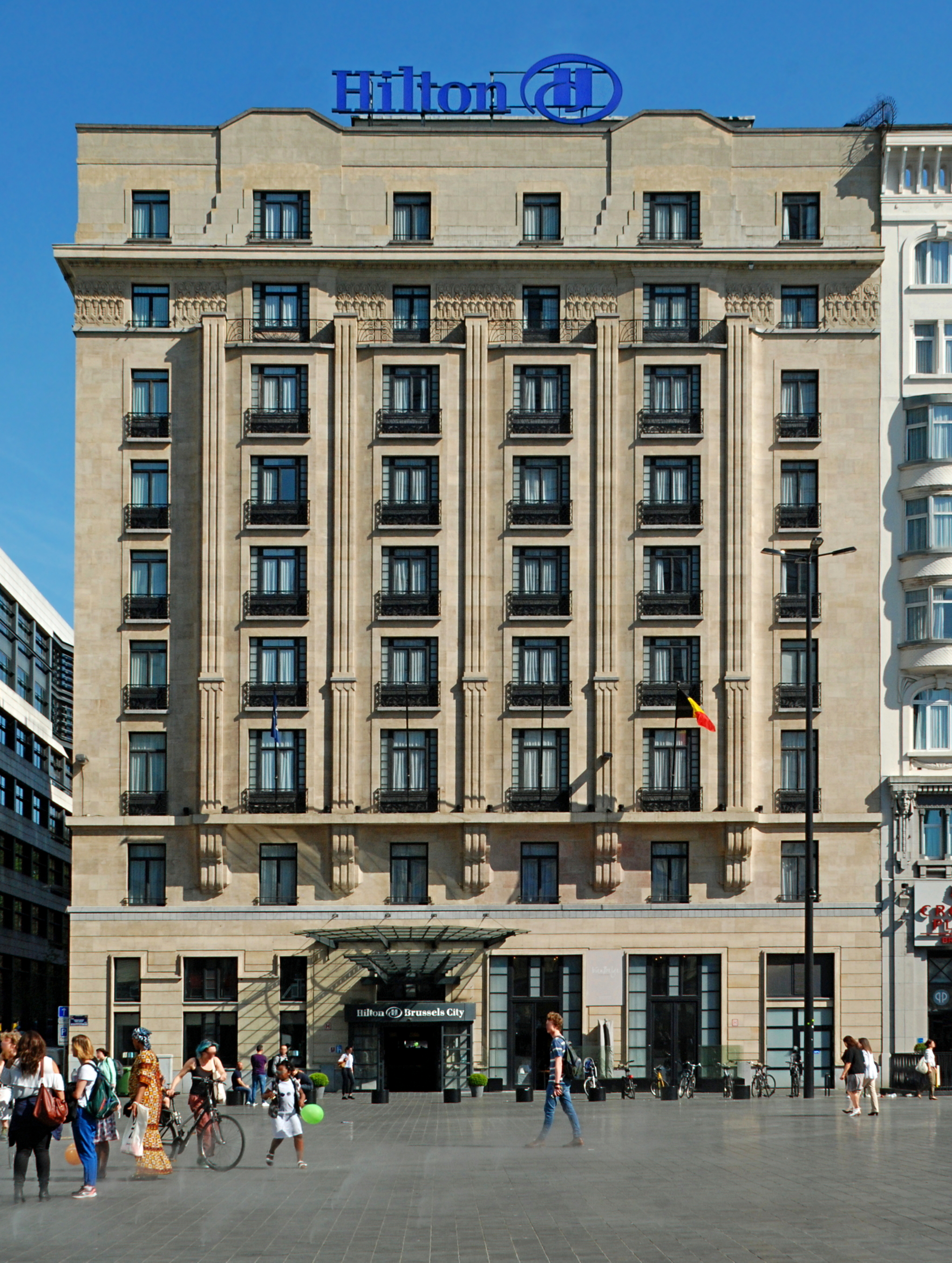
Hôtel Albert I (Polak and Poor, 1929)

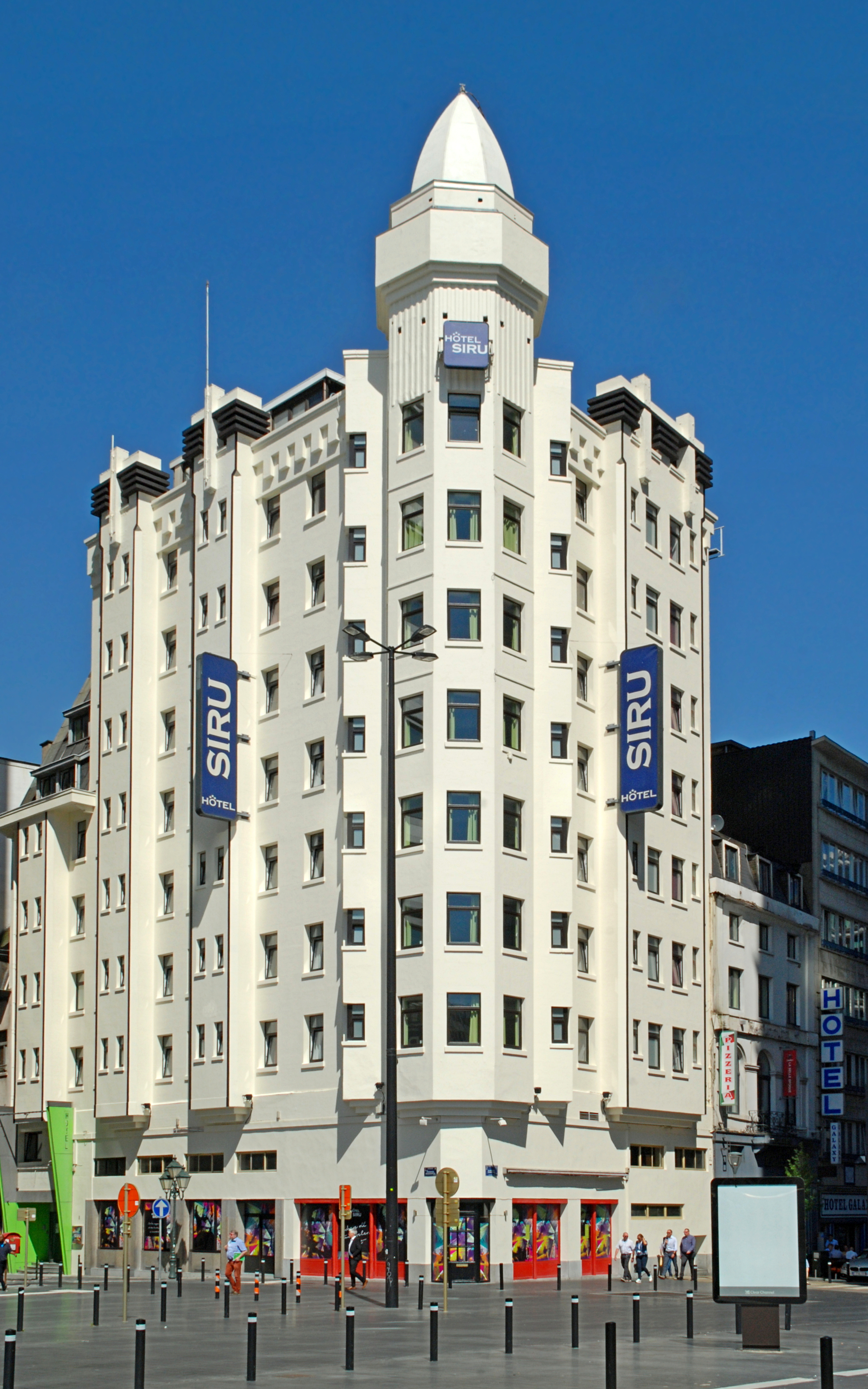
Hôtel Siru (Chabot, 1932)

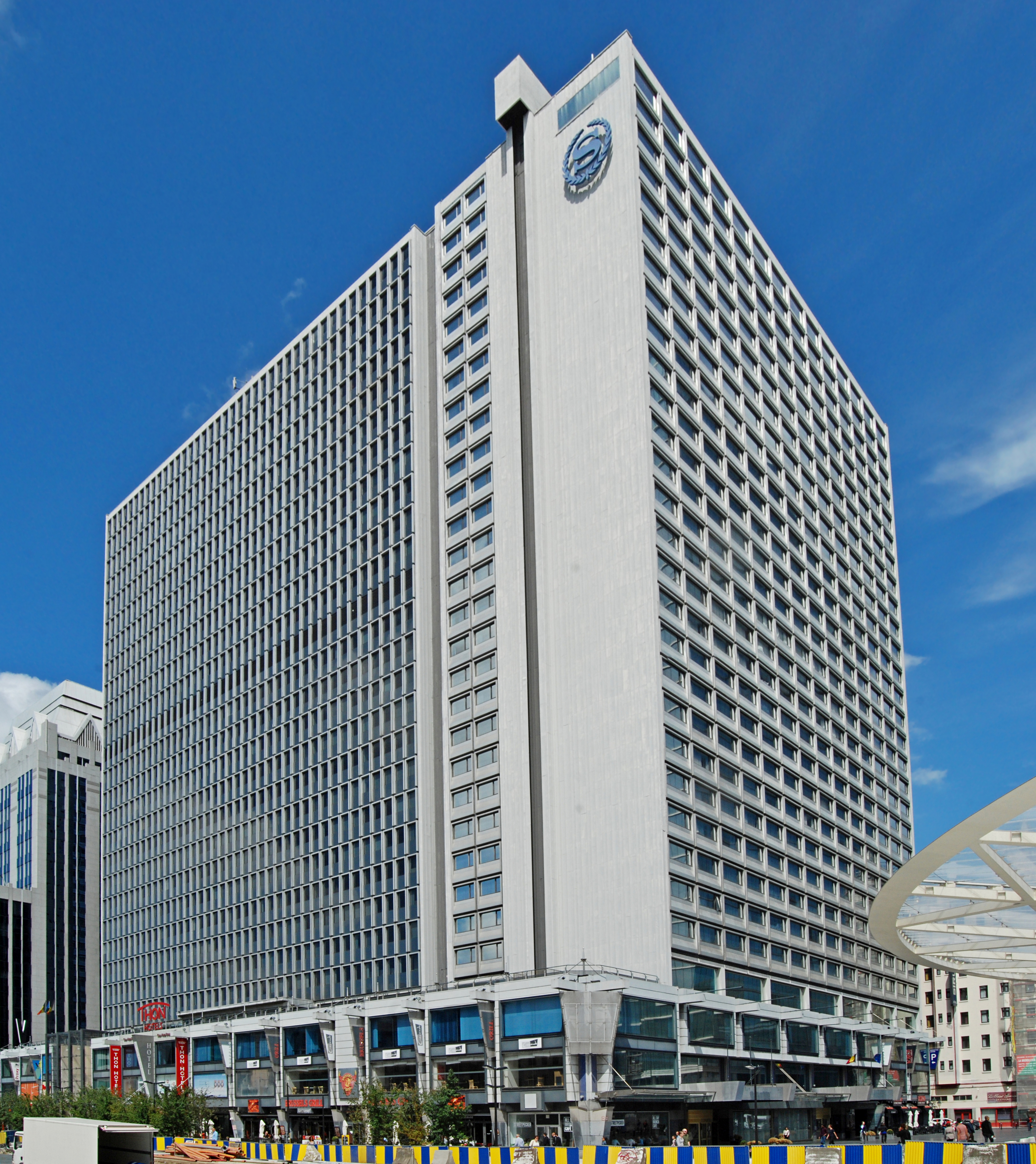
Manhattan Center (Van Hove, 1972)

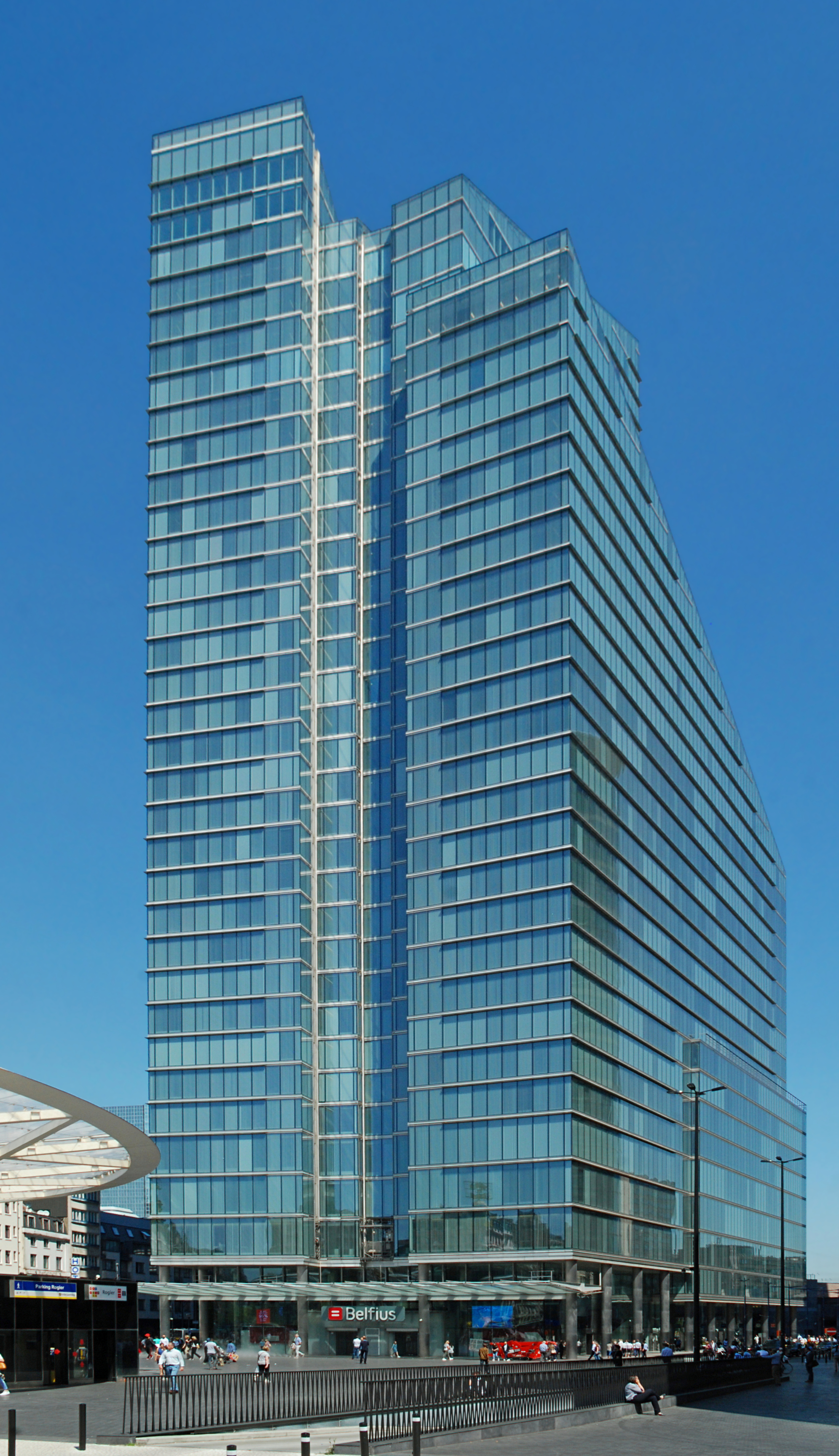
Rogier Tower (Samyn and Jaspers-Eyers, 2006)

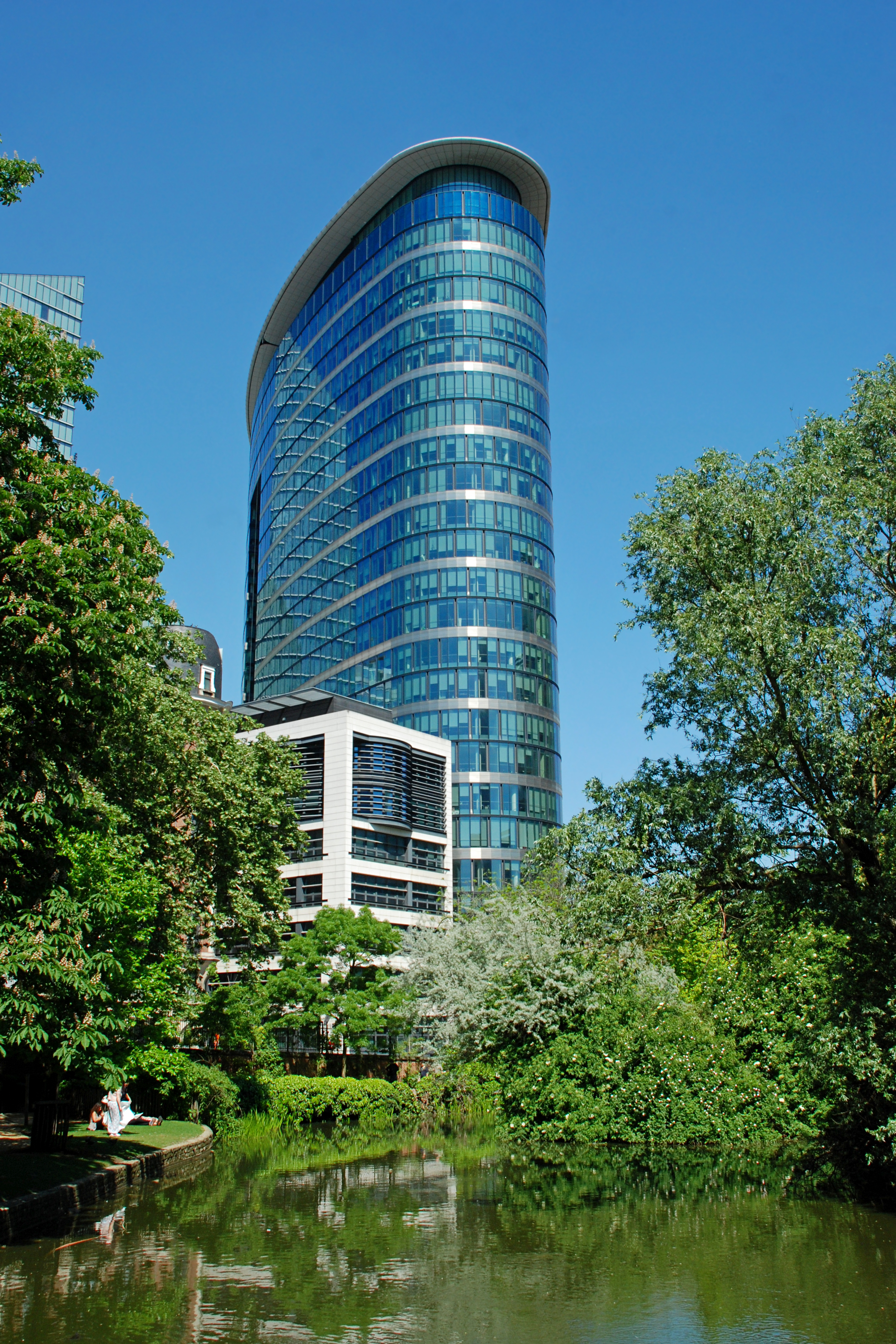
Covent Garden (Montois, 2007)

== See also ==
- Central Boulevards of Brussels
- Art Nouveau in Brussels
- Art Deco in Brussels
- History of Brussels
- Belgium in the long nineteenth century
