= North Galaxy Towers =

Twin skyscrapers in Brussels, Belgium

- Tours North Galaxy (French); North Galaxytorens (Dutch)
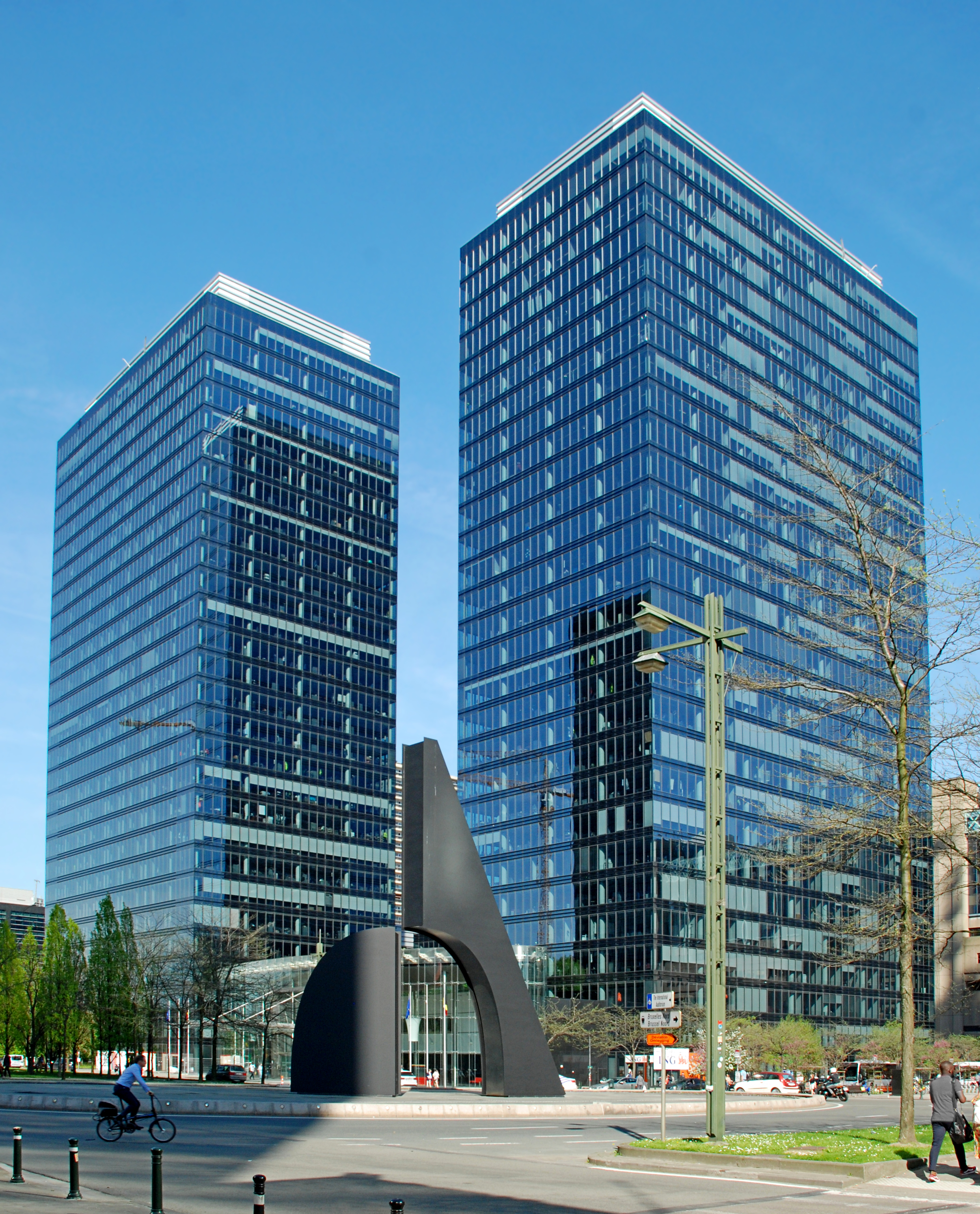
- North Galaxy Towers A and B seen from the Boulevard du Roi Albert II/Koning Albert II-laan

General information
- Status: Completed
- Type: Office buildings
- Location: Boulevard du Roi Albert II / Koning Albert II-laan 33, 1030 Schaerbeek, Brussels-Capital Region, Belgium
- Coordinates: 50°51′41″N 4°21′33″E
- Construction started: 2002
- Completed: 2004

Height
- Roof: 107 m (351 ft)

Technical details
- Floor count: 28
- Floor area: 156,000 m^{2} (1,680,000 sq ft)

The North Galaxy Towers (French: Tours North Galaxy; Dutch: North Galaxytorens) are twin 28-storey skyscrapers on the Boulevard du Roi Albert II/Koning Albert II-laan in the Northern Quarter central business district of Brussels, Belgium. There is a third building in the complex which is six storeys tall. The first two floors are shared by all three buildings.

The two towers are 107 metres (351 ft) tall, placing them amongst the tallest buildings in Belgium. The complex has 110,000 m^{2} (1,200,000 sq ft) of office space above ground and 46,000 m^{2} (500,000 sq ft) below ground. About 8,000 m^{2} (86,000 sq ft) of the space below ground is used for archives. There are a total of 35 elevators in the complex.

The towers were originally conceived as part of an eight-building Brussels World Trade Center (WTC) complex, but were splintered off into a separate project. The construction of the towers began in 2002 and was completed in 2004.

The complex is being leased by the Belgian Federal Government. It houses the Federal Public Financial Service and other governmental bodies, with all three buildings used for administration and management.

== See also ==
- Astro Tower
- Finance Tower
- Madou Plaza Tower
- Proximus Towers
- Rogier Tower
- World Trade Center (Brussels)
