= Northern Quarter, Brussels =

Central business district in Brussels, Belgium

Northern Quarter: Quartier Nord (French); Noordwijk (Dutch)
- Neighbourhood
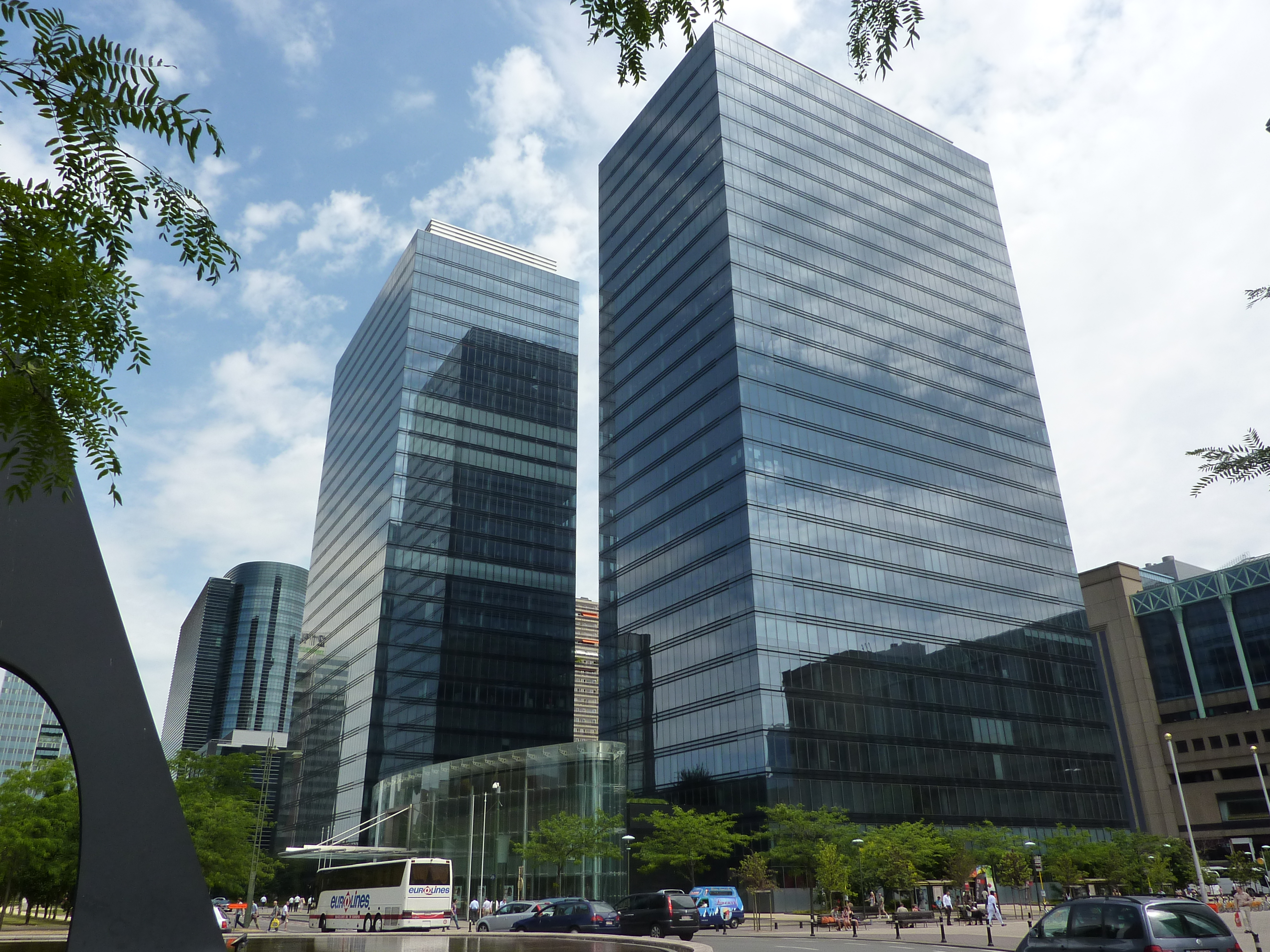
- Brussels' Northern Quarter business district

- Location within Brussels Northern Quarter (Belgium)
- Coordinates: 50°51′29″N 4°21′33″E
- Country: Belgium
- Region: Brussels-Capital Region
- Arrondissement: Brussels-Capital
- Municipality: City of Brussels; Saint-Josse-ten-Noode; Schaerbeek
- Time zone: UTC+1 (CET)
  - Summer (DST): UTC+2 (CEST)
- Postal code: 1000, 1030, 1210
- Area codes: 02

The Northern Quarter (French: Quartier Nord [kaʁtje nɔʁ] or Espace Nord [ɛspas nɔʁ]; Dutch: Noordwijk [ˈnoːrtʋɛik] or Noordruimte [ˈnoːrtˌrœymtə]) is the central business district of Brussels, Belgium. Like La Défense in Paris, the Docklands in London or the Zuidas in Amsterdam, the Northern Quarter consists of a concentration of high-rise buildings where many Belgian and multinational companies have their headquarters.

The Northern Quarter roughly covers the area between the Quai de Willebroeck/Willebroekkaai near the Brussels Canal, railways along Brussels-North railway station and the northern side of the Small Ring (Brussels' inner ring road). The territory is thus split between the municipalities of Saint-Josse-ten-Noode, Schaerbeek and the City of Brussels.

The area is characterised by high-rise buildings, most around 100 metres (330 ft) tall. Over half of the twenty tallest buildings in Belgium are located in the Northern Quarter. The area has around 1,200,000 m^{2} (13,000,000 sq ft) of office space occupied by 40,000 workers. It has an additional 8,000 residents.

== History ==
=== Origins ===
The area of what is today the Northern Quarter was first planned in the middle of the 19th century. Between 1850 and 1890, the north of Brussels heavily benefitted from industrialisation with the opening of Allée Verte/Groendreef railway station, as well as the industries along the Brussels Canal (the future Port of Brussels). This first station was replaced in March 1846 by a new monumental station, Brussels-North railway station, on the Place Charles Rogier/Karel Rogierplein, a short distance east from the original site, on the territory of the municipality of Saint-Josse-ten-Noode.

Attracted by the industrial opportunities, many inhabitants settled in the area, first from the other Belgian provinces (mainly rural residents from Flanders) and France, then from Southern European, and more recently from Eastern European and African countries. Populated mainly by workers, the district was very popular, and had a very strong cultural identity. It was thus decided then to lay out new orthogonal streets on the axes of the Chaussée d'Anvers/Antwerpsesteenweg and the Boulevard d'Anvers/Antwerpselaan to accommodate this growing populace.

The Northern Quarter has the particularity of straddling three municipalities (Saint-Josse-ten-Noode, Schaerbeek and the City of Brussels). The boundary between the three municipalities meandered like the bed of the Senne river, which was belatedly vaulted in this northern district. It is wedged between the North Station, Brussels' historic city centre (the Pentagon) and the canal.

=== 1960s to present ===
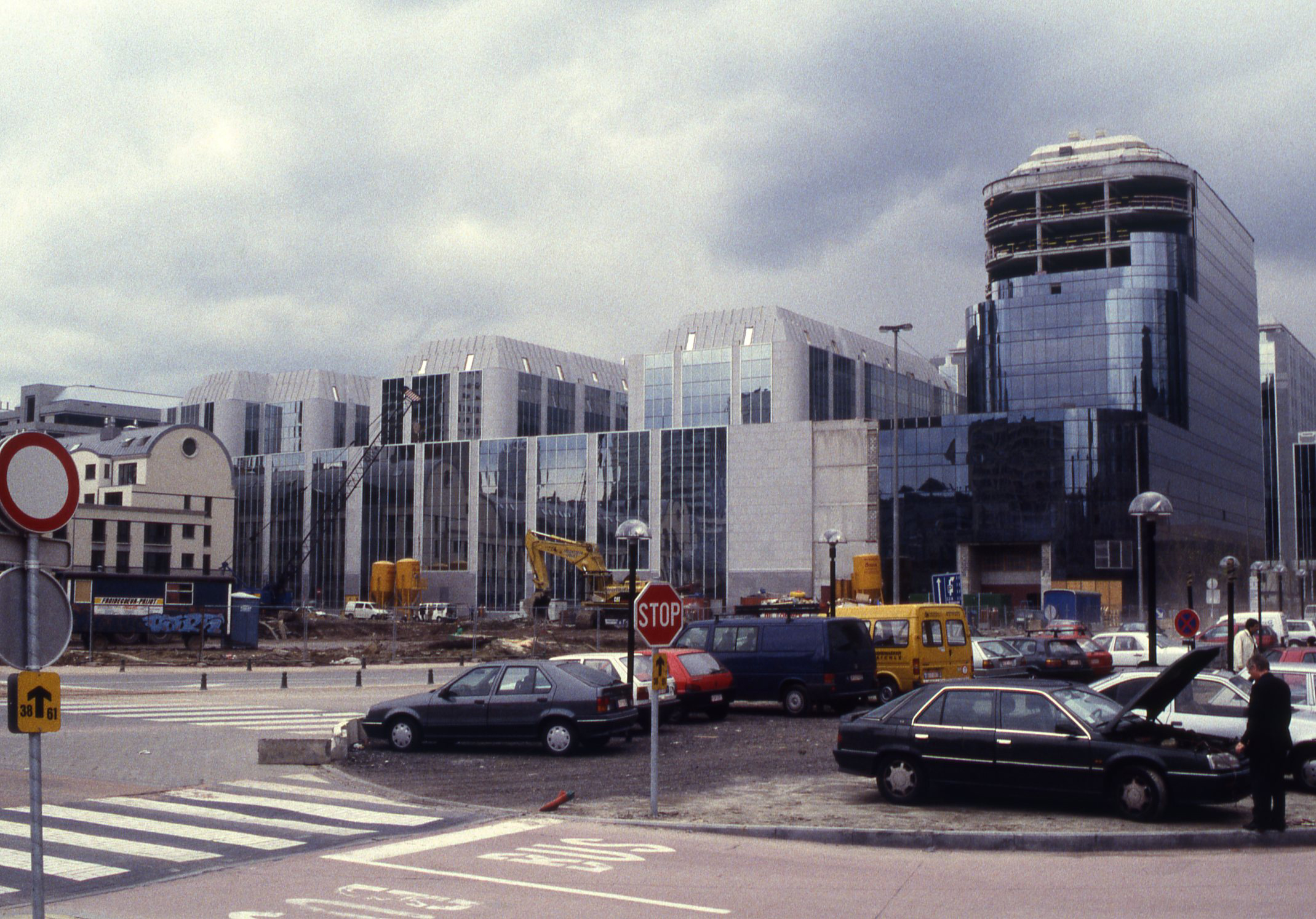
The Northern Quarter under construction in the 1990s

The neighbourhood, deemed unhealthy, was largely razed in the 1960s at the end of the largest expropriation campaign that marked the history of Brussels. The so-called Manhattan Project was born (not to be confused with the World War II project of the same name). More specifically, it consisted, on the one hand, of the demolition of 53 ha (130 acres) of the formerly working class district and the creation of a central business district in its place, and on the other, of the redevelopment of the area north of the Place Rogier, after it had become vacant with the demolition of the old North Station in 1956. The construction plan was approved on 17 February 1967 by the then-Prime Minister Paul Vanden Boeynants.

The creation of the business district was controversial. The demolition of a built-up and occupied residential area around the North Station was not universally appreciated. Over 15,000 residents were forced out for this purpose. Shortly after the first rows of residences were demolished, an economic crisis struck, leaving an urban void. It was so decried that, in 1989, the newly created Brussels-Capital Region tried to remedy the problem by giving the town planning of the district a more human side. The area has since filled up with skyscrapers around the Boulevard du Roi Albert II/Koning Albert II-laan and the Boulevard Simon Bolivar/Simon Bolivarlaan.

The first towers were completed in the 1970s and include the World Trade Center (WTC) 1 and 2. The TBR Tower and the WTC 3 followed in the 1980s. At the same time, the first residents of the Northern Residence were also able to move in. After a lull in building in the 1990s (with the exception of the Proximus Towers in 1994), projects resumed in the 2000s: the North Galaxy Towers (2004), the Ellipse building (2006) and the Covent Garden (2007). The 137-metre-tall (449 ft) Rogier Tower, completed in 2006, gave more character to the skyline. The Zenith Tower also anchors the perspective of the boulevard on its northern end. Now that the area is an established business district, more and more companies, in addition to federal and regional administrations, have offices in the district.

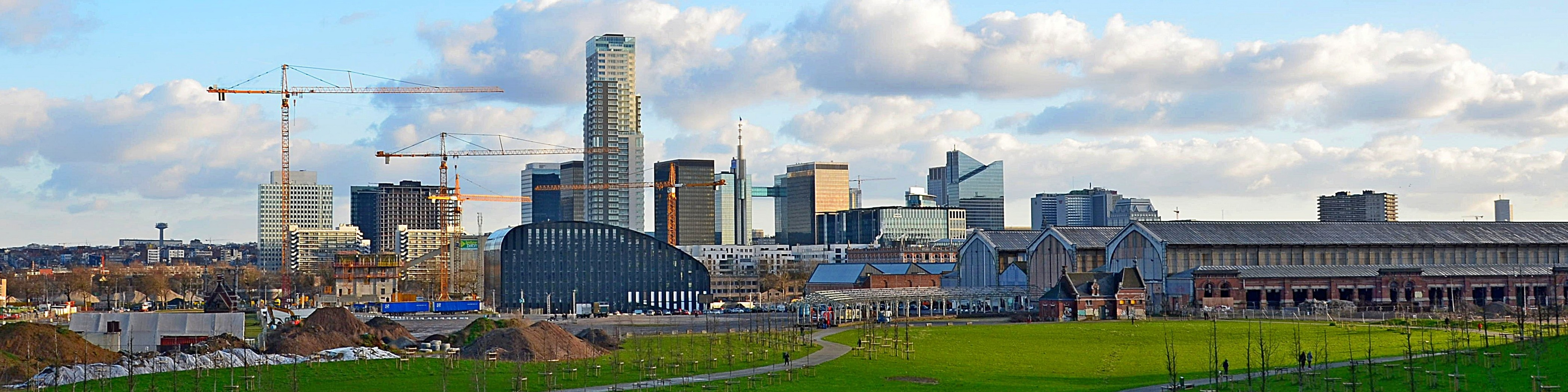
Skyline of the Northern Quarter, as seen from Tour & Taxis

== Notable buildings ==
=== Current buildings ===
Name	Built	Municipality
Baudouin Tower	1989–1992	Saint-Josse-ten-Noode
Boréal building	2000–2009	Saint-Josse-ten-Noode
Brussels-North railway station	1952–1956	Schaerbeek
Covent Garden	2007	Saint-Josse-ten-Noode
Ellipse building	2006	Schaerbeek
Iris Tower	2018–2020	Saint-Josse-ten-Noode
Manhattan Center	1972	Saint-Josse-ten-Noode
Möbius Towers	2017–2021	City of Brussels
North Galaxy Towers	2004	Schaerbeek
Northern Communication Center (CCN)	1974–1982	Schaerbeek
Northern Residence	1974–1976	Schaerbeek
Proximus Towers	1994	Schaerbeek
Quatuor Towers	2018–2021	City of Brussels
Rogier Tower	2006	Saint-Josse-ten-Noode
UP-site	2014	City of Brussels
Victoria Tower	1974–1978	Saint-Josse-ten-Noode
World Trade Center (WTC) 3	1983	City of Brussels
Zenith Tower	2007–2009	Schaerbeek

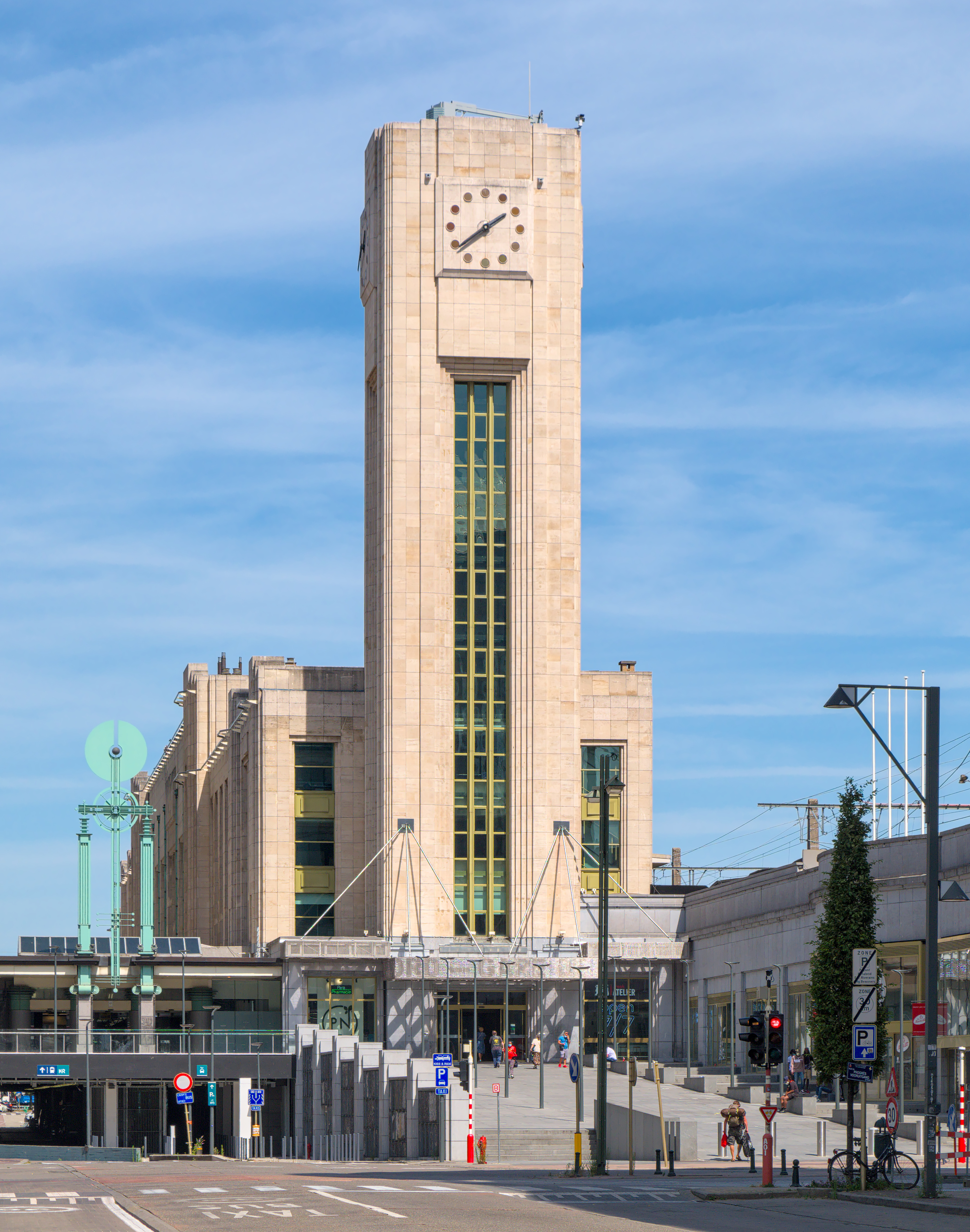
Brussels-North railway station (Saintenoy, 1952–1956)

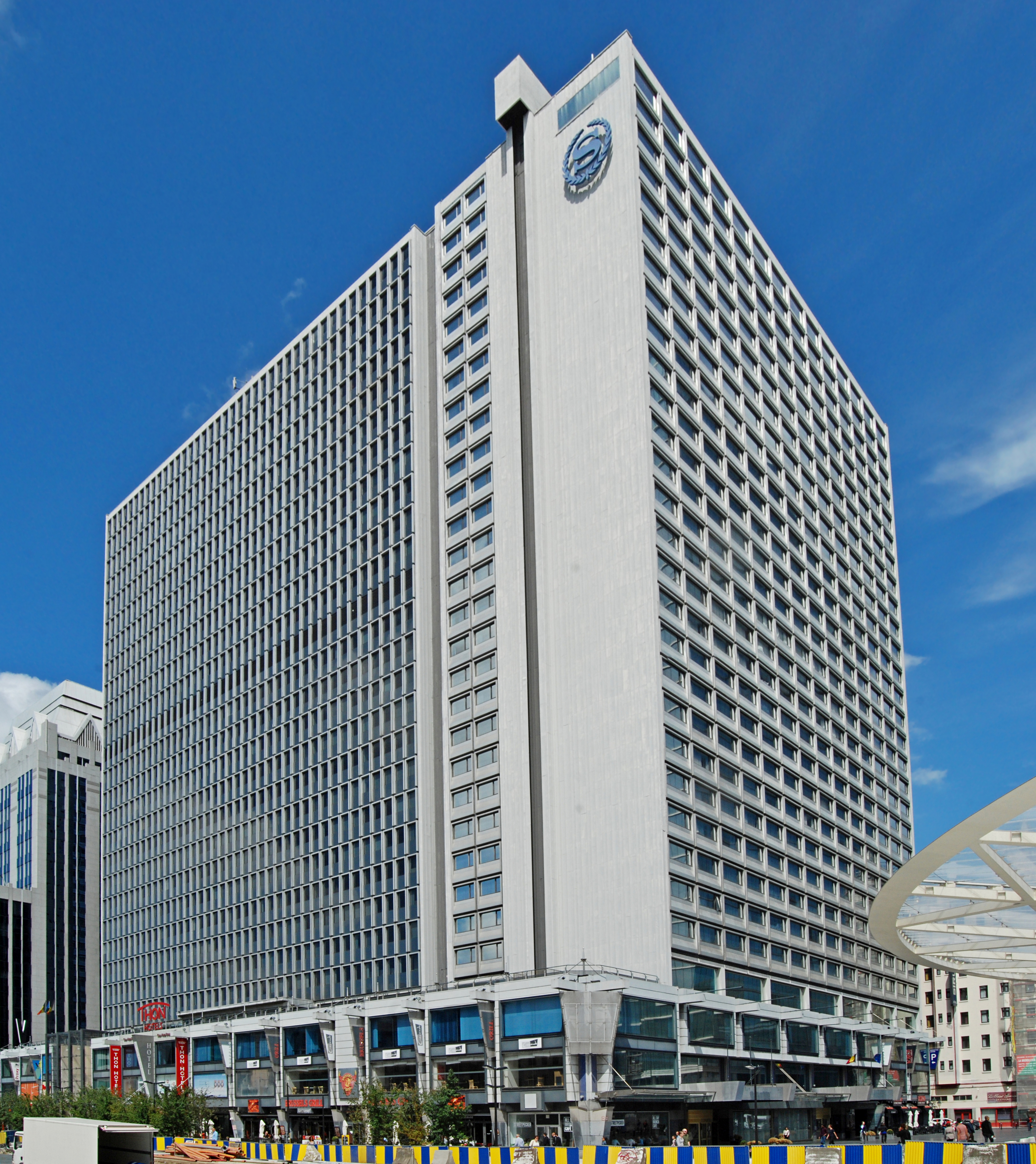
Manhattan Center (Van Hove, 1972)

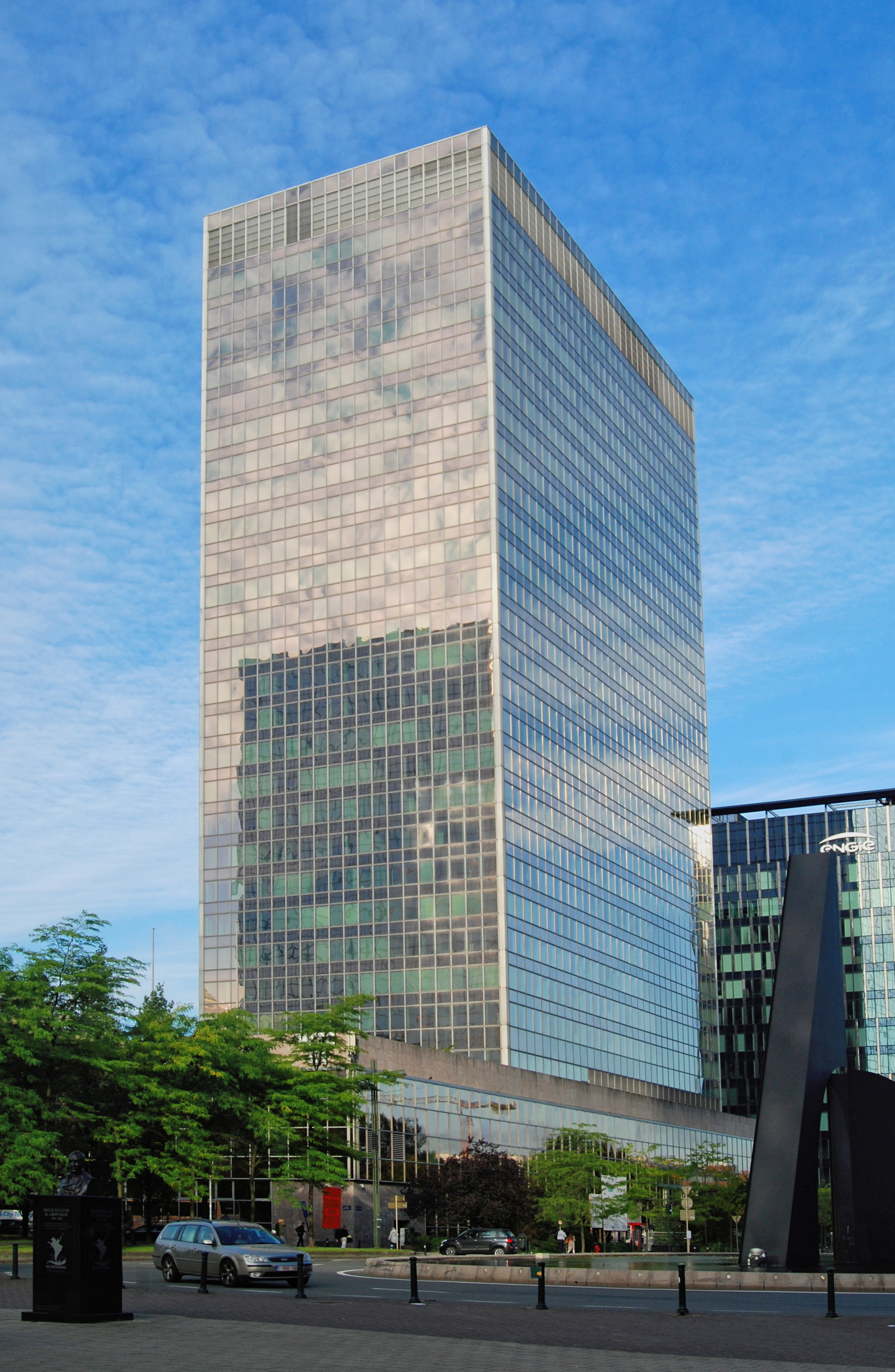
World Trade Center (WTC) 3 (Polak, 1983)

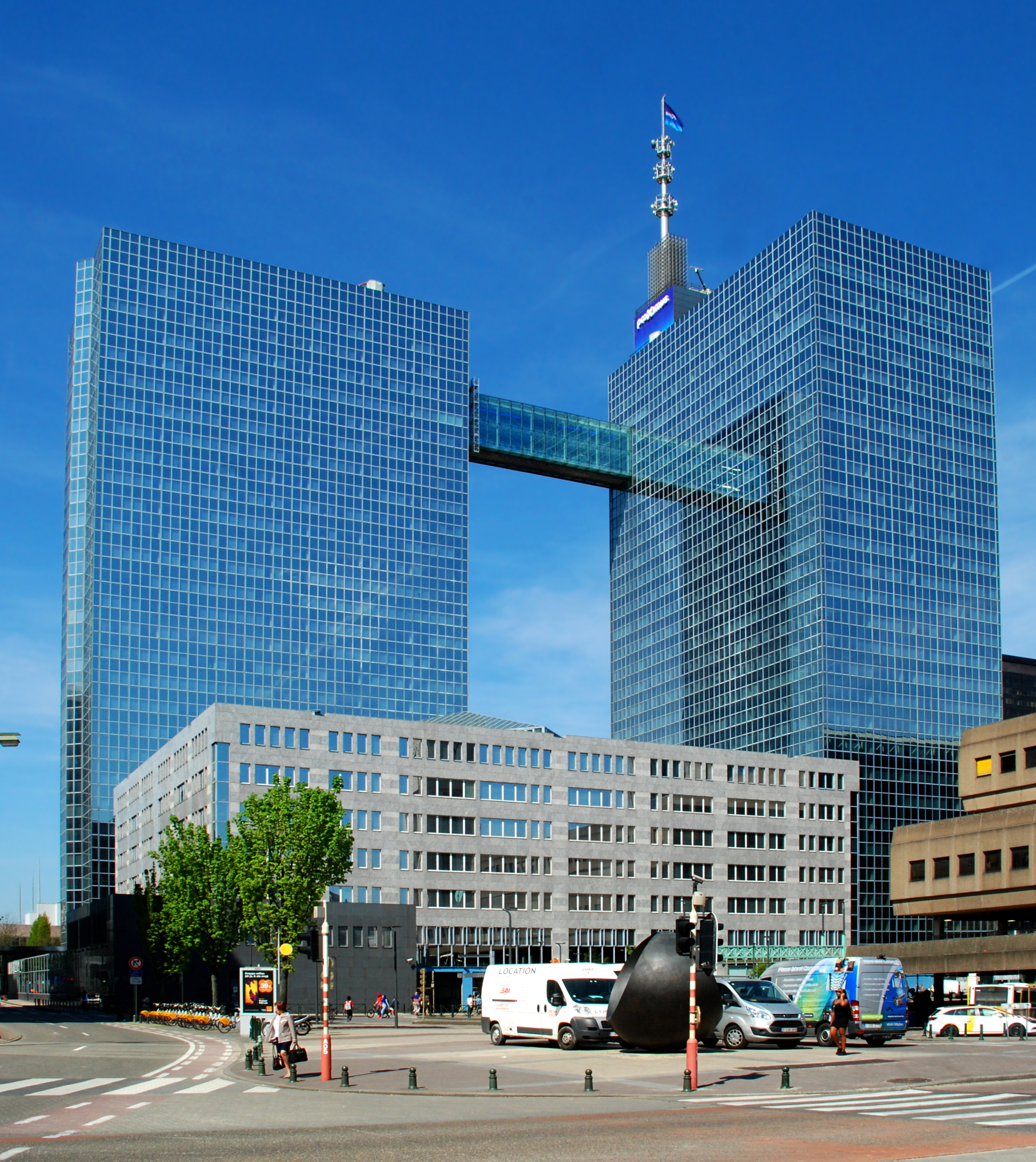
Proximus Towers (Jaspers-Eyers, 1994)

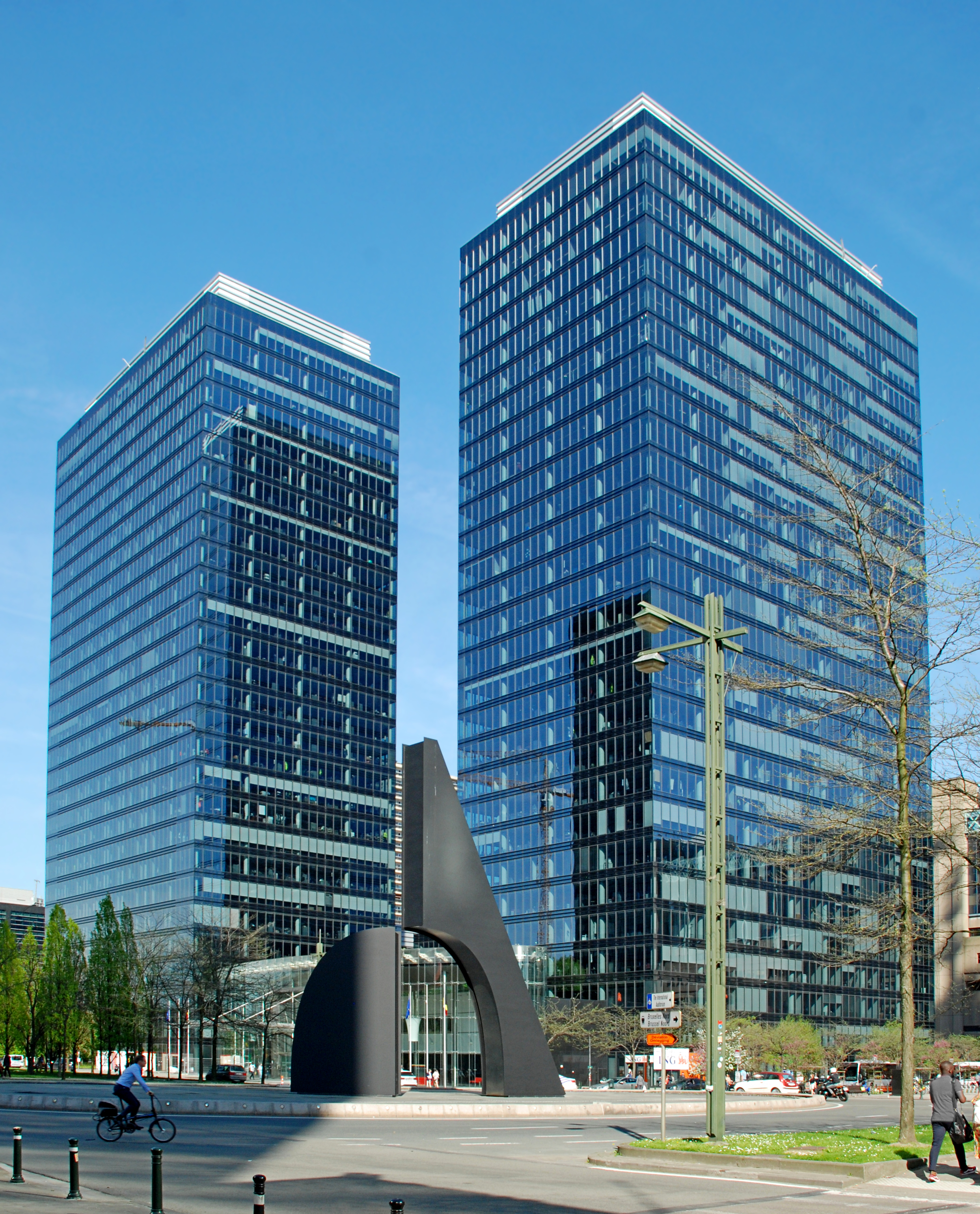
North Galaxy Towers (Jaspers-Eyers and Montois, 2004)

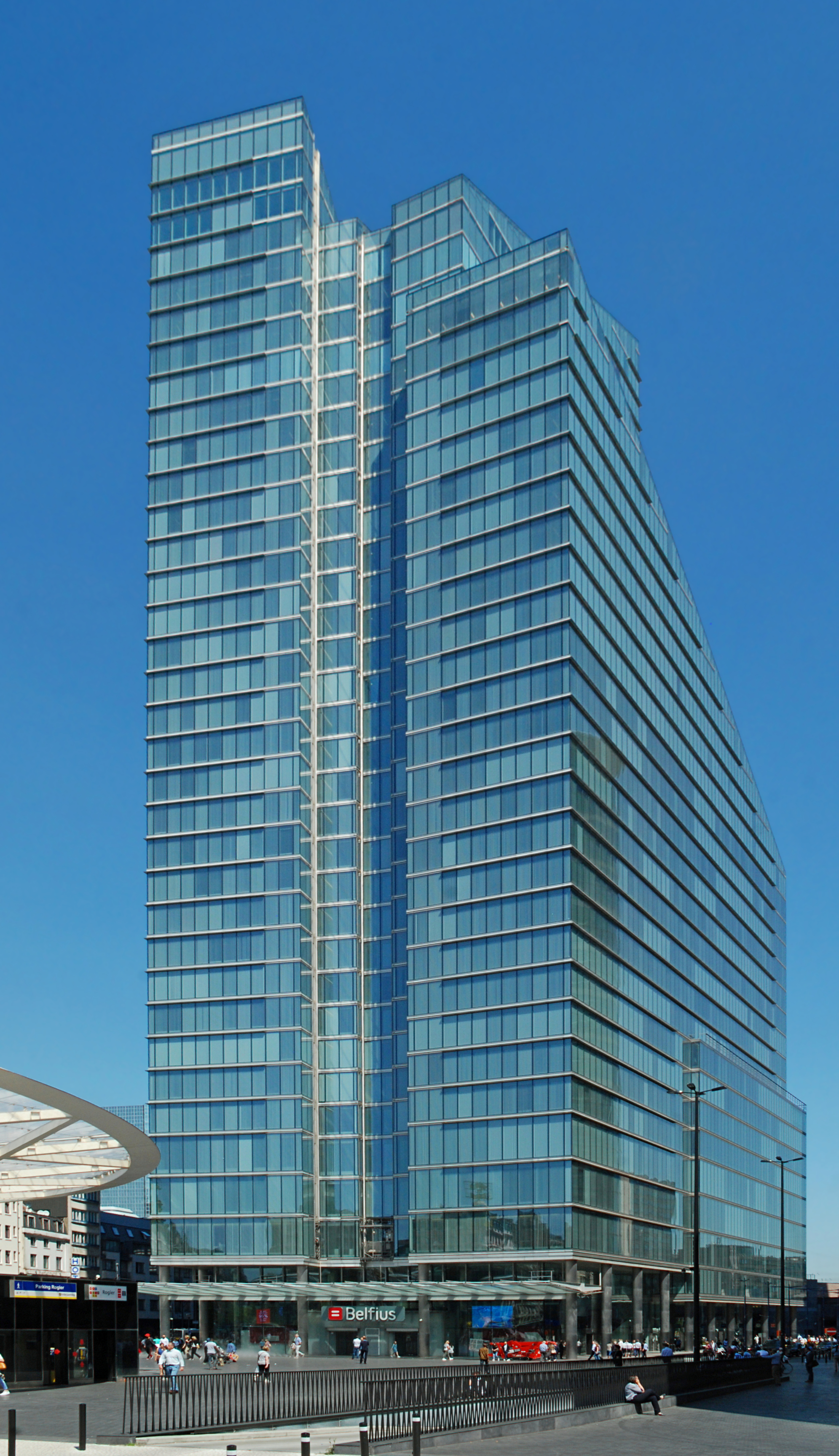
Rogier Tower (Samyn and Jaspers-Eyers, 2006)

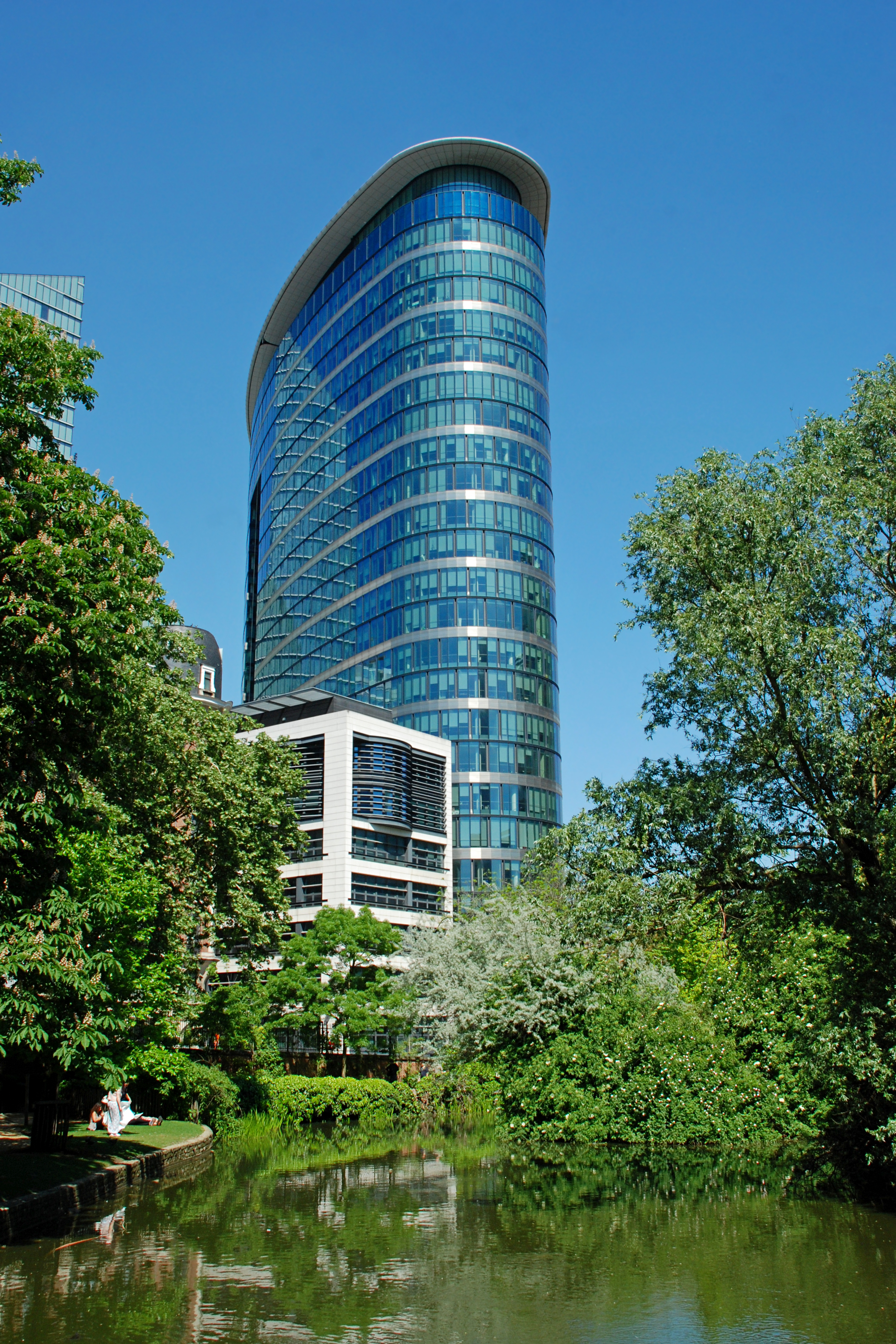
Covent Garden (Montois, 2007)

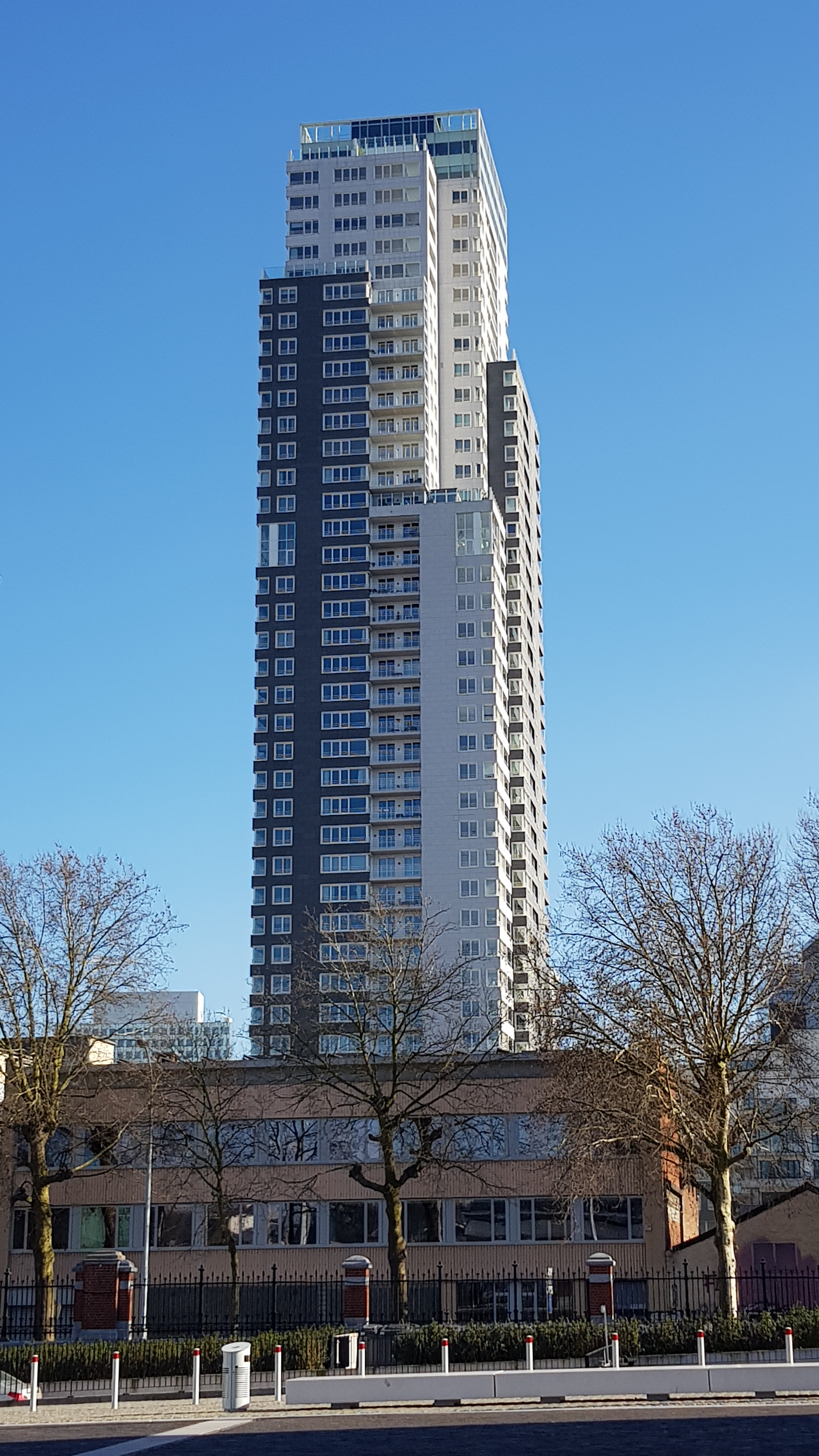
UP-site (Lion Workshops, 2014)

=== Former buildings ===
Name	Built	Demolished	Municipality
Noord Building	1989–1990	2018	City of Brussels
TBR Tower	1976	2017	City of Brussels
World Trade Center (WTC) 1 and 2	1972 and 1976	2021	City of Brussels

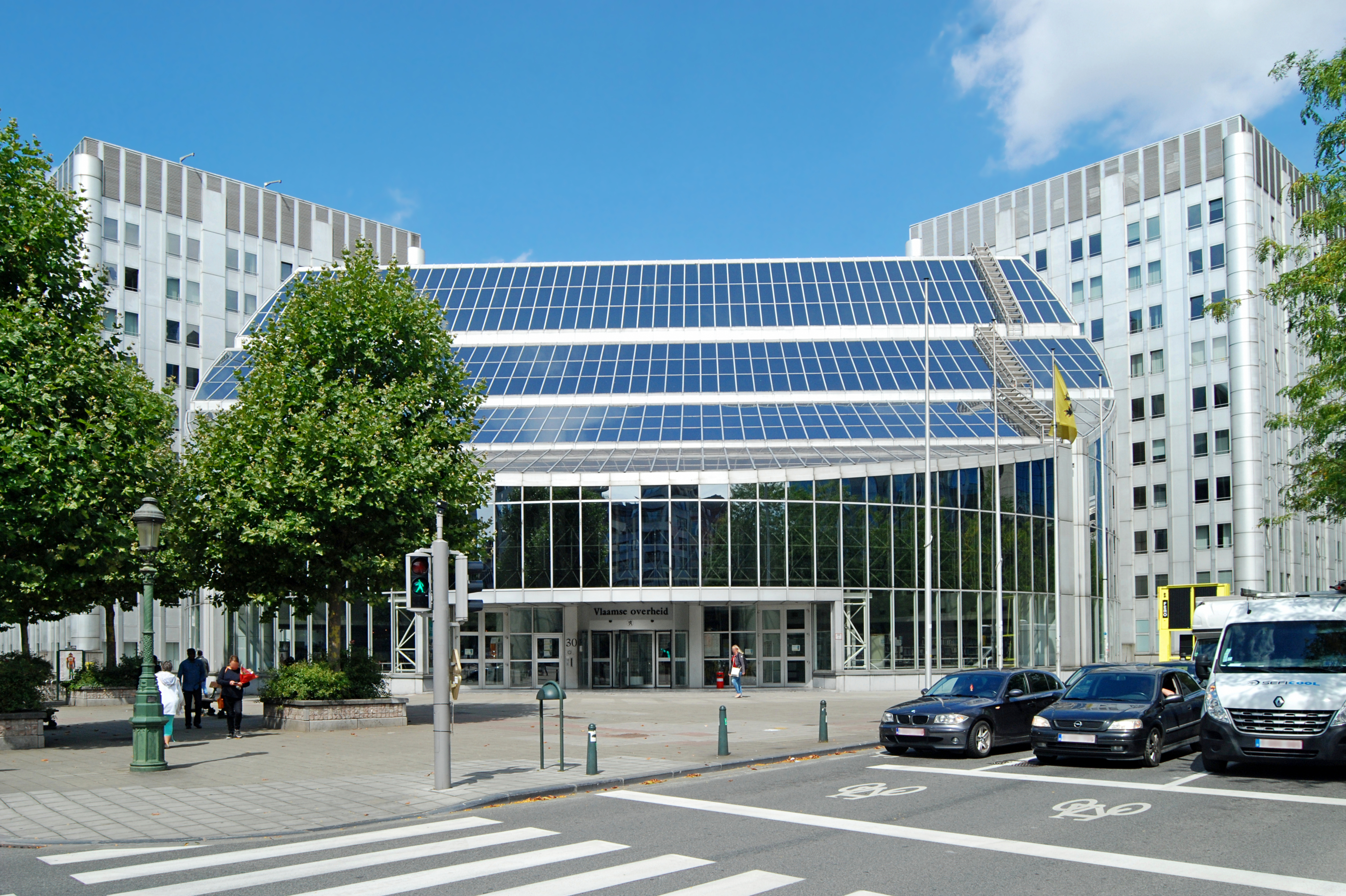
Noord Building (Jaspers-Eyers, 1989–1990) (demolished)

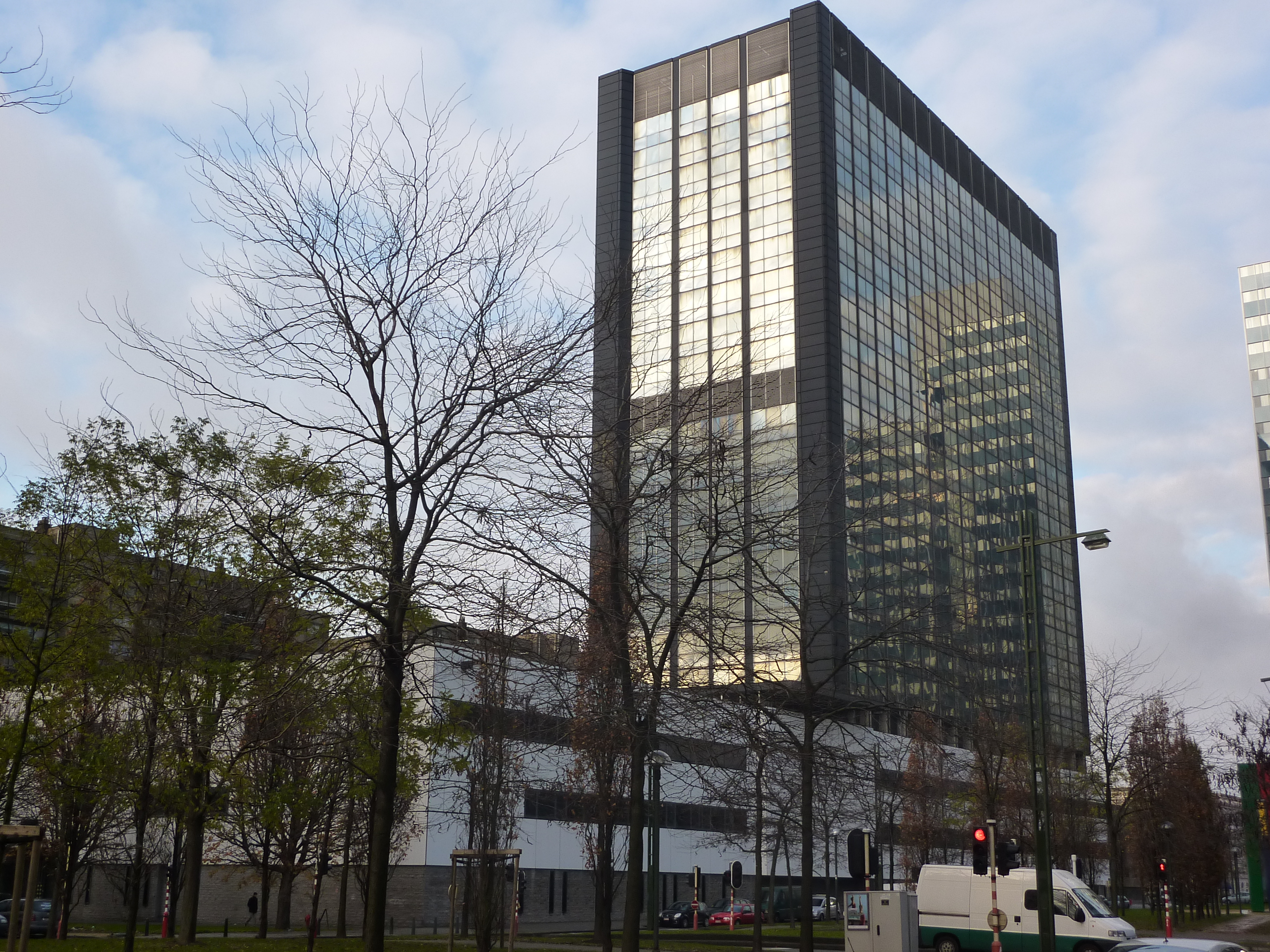
TBR Tower (Guchez, 1976) (demolished)

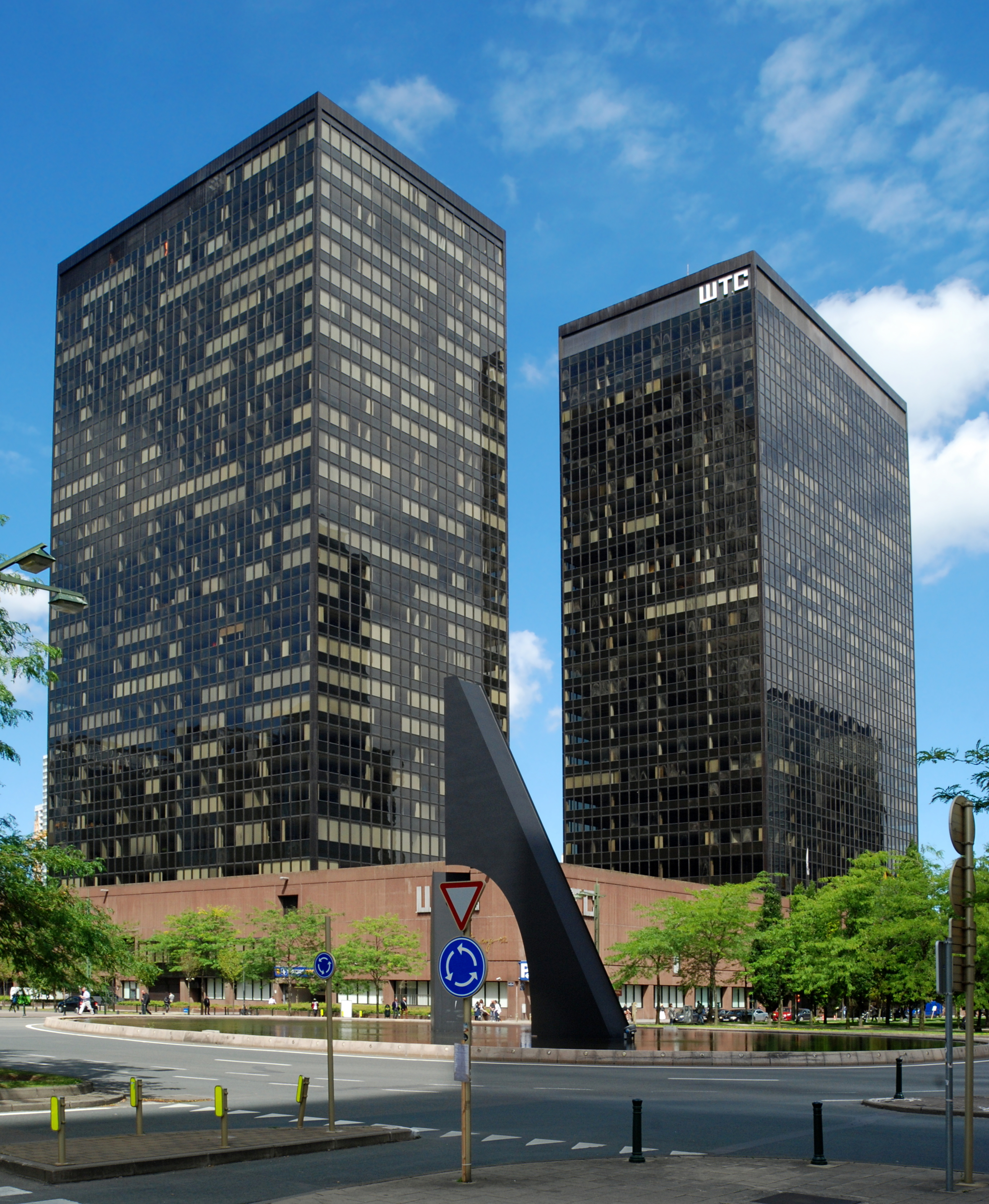
World Trade Center (WTC) 1 and 2 (Polak, 1972 and 1976) (demolished)

== See also ==
- Neighbourhoods in Brussels
- Brusselisation
- History of Brussels
- Belgium in the long nineteenth century
