= List of tallest buildings in Brussels =

Skyline of Brussels
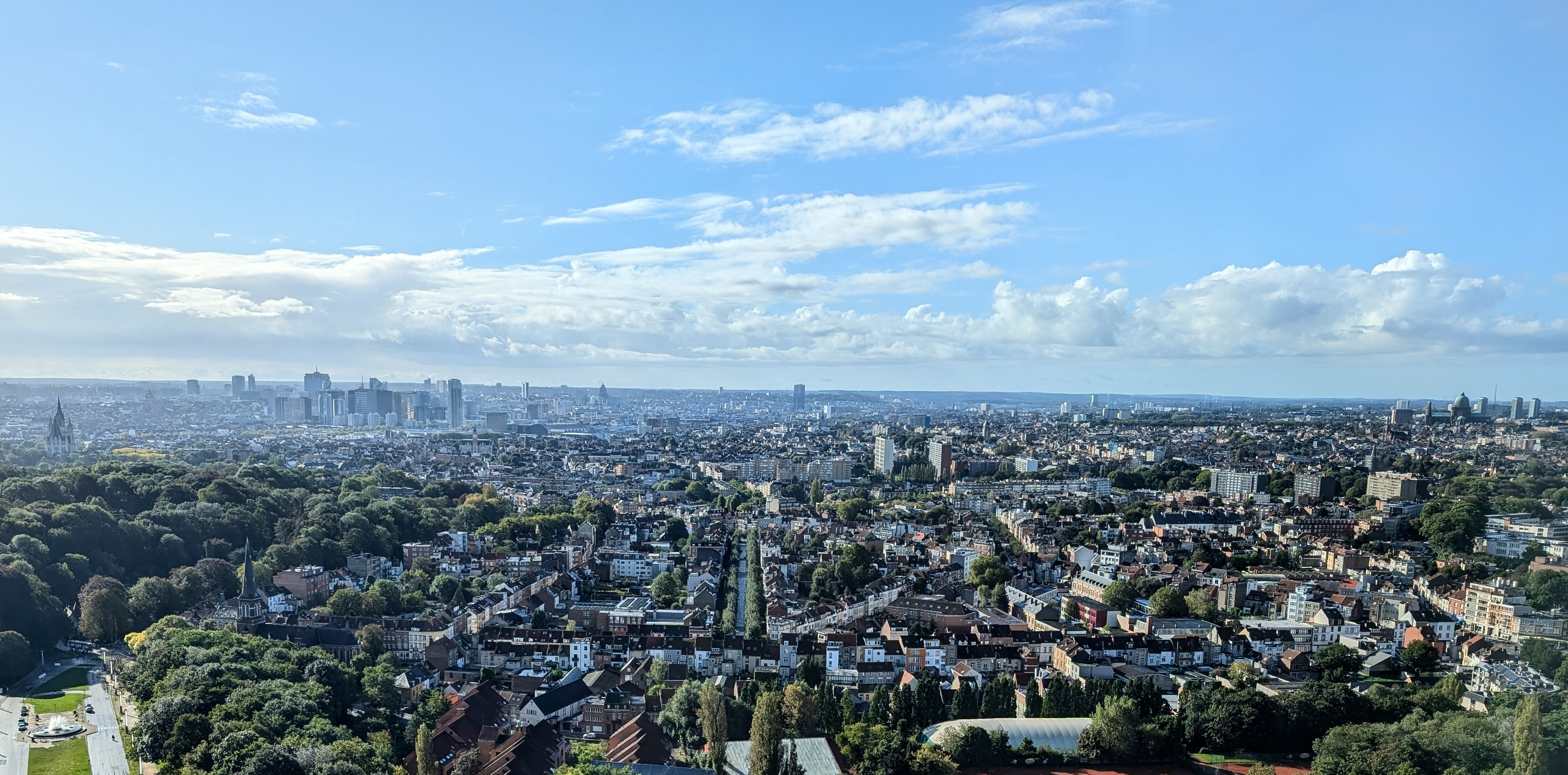
- Brussels-Capital Region skyline from the Atomium
- Tallest building: South Tower
- Tallest building height: 150 m (492 ft)

Number of tall buildings
- Taller than 75 m (246 ft): 30
- Taller than 100 m (328 ft): 17

Brussels, officially the Brussels-Capital Region, is a region in Belgium comprising 19 municipalities, including the City of Brussels, the largest municipality, which is the capital of Belgium. The large majority of Belgium's skyscrapers and high-rise buildings are located across the region, including municipalities such as the City of Brussels, Saint-Josse-ten-Noode and Schaerbeek. It is by far the largest skyline in Belgium.

As of 2026, Brussels has 19 habitable buildings that reach a height of at least 100 metres (328 ft). The tallest building in Brussels is the South Tower, a 38-storey office building built in 1967 that stands at about 150 metres (492 ft), making it the tallest building in Belgium. One of Brussels' most recognizable landmarks is the Atomium, a modernist structure built in 1958 that stands 102 metres (335 ft) tall.

== Tallest buildings and structures ==
This lists ranks the tallest buildings in Brussels that stand at least 75 metres (246 ft) based on standard height measurement. This includes spires and architectural details but does not include antenna masts. An equals sign (=) following a rank indicates the same height between two or more buildings. The "Year" column indicates the year of completion.

Rank	Name	Image	Location	Height m (ft)	Floors	Year	Purpose	Notes
1	South Tower		City of Brussels 50°50′16.35″N 4°20′12.71″E	150 m (492 ft)	38	1967	Office	Tallest building in Brussels and in Belgium since 1967. Was the tallest building in the European Economic Community upon completion.
2	Finance Tower		City of Brussels 50°51′10.3″N 4°21′52.49″E	145 m (476 ft)	36	1982	Office	Second tallest building in Brussels and has the most office space in Belgium.
3	UP-site		City of Brussels 50°51′51.74″N 4°21′8.83″E	142 m (466 ft)	42	2014	Residential	Tallest residential building in Brussels and in Belgium.
4=	Iris Tower		City of Brussels 50°51′24.9″N 4°21′40.8″E	137 m (449 ft)	32	2020	Office	
4=	Rogier Tower		Saint-Josse-ten-Noode 50°51′22.75″N 4°21′33.55″E	136.9 m (449 ft)	38	2006	Office	
6	Madou Plaza Tower		Saint-Josse-ten-Noode 50°50′58.11″N 4°22′11.57″E	120 m (394 ft)	33	1965	Office	
7	Astro Tower		Saint-Josse-ten-Noode 50°51′4.14″N 4°22′11.66″E	107 m (351 ft)	31	1976	Office	
8=	North Galaxy, Tower 1		Schaerbeek 50°51′41.93″N 4°21′32.82″E	107 m (351 ft)	28	2004	Office	
8=	North Galaxy, Tower 2		Schaerbeek 50°51′39.57″N 4°21′33.12″E	107 m (351 ft)	28	2004	Office	
10	The One		City of Brussels 50°50′36″N 4°22′40″E	105.2 m (345 ft)	22	2019	Mixed-use	
11	World Trade Center, Tower 3		City of Brussels 50°51′38.64″N 4°21′23.08″E	105 m (344 ft)	28	1983	Office	
N/A	Palace of Justice of Brussels		City of Brussels 50°50′11.64″N 4°21′06.01″E	104 m (341 ft)	N/A	1883	Courthouse	
N/A	Atomium		City of Brussels 50°53′41.91″N 4°20′29.06″E	102 m (335 ft)	N/A	1958	Landmark	
12=	Proximus, Tower 2 (T)		Saint-Josse-ten-Noode 50°51′36.91″N 4°21′31.44″E	102 m (335 ft)	32	1994	Office	
12=	Proximus, Tower 1 (U)		Schaerbeek 50°51′35.3″N 4°21′28.97″E	102 m (335 ft)	32	1994	Office	Including the spire has a total height of 120 m (394 ft)
12=	World Trade Center, Tower 1		City of Brussels 50°51′43.17″N 4°21′27.54″E	102 m (335 ft)	28	1972	Office	
12=	World Trade Center, Tower 2		City of Brussels 50°51′41.56″N 4°21′24.65″E	102 m (335 ft)	28	1976	Office	
12=	IT Tower		City of Brussels 50°49′02.00″N 4°22′20.00″E	102 m (335 ft)	25	1971	Office	Height to roof is 80 m (262 ft)
12=	Manhattan Center		Saint-Josse-ten-Noode 50°51′22.13″N 4°21′27.06″E	102 m (335 ft)	30	1973	Mixed-use	
18=	Résidence Brusilia		Schaerbeek 50.86483°N 4.37937°E	100 m (328 ft)	36	1974	Residential	Tallest residential building in Brussels until the UP-site tower was completed in 2014.
18=	Covent Garden Tower		Saint-Josse-ten-Noode 50°51′22.13″N 4°21′39.00″E	100 m (328 ft)	26	2007	Office	
N/A	Church of Our Lady of Laeken		City of Brussels 50°52′42.98″N 4°21′21.23″E	99 m (325 ft)	N/A	1911	Catholic parish church	
20	The Hotel Brussels		City of Brussels 50°50′15.00″N 4°21′26.00″E	99 m (325 ft)	30	1967	Hotel	
21	Möbius Tower II		City of Brussels 50°51′46.29″N 4°21′28.56″E	98 m (321 ft)	23	2021	Office	
N/A	Brussels Town Hall		City of Brussels 50°40′26.69″N 5°38′36.57″E	96 m (315 ft)	N/A	1455	Town Hall	
22	Zenith Tower		Schaerbeek 50°51′50″N 4°21′32″E	95 m (312 ft)	22	2009	Office	
23	Bastion Tower		Ixelles 50°50′18.26″N 4°21′45.90″E	90 m (295 ft)	26	1970	Office	
N/A	Basilica of the Sacred Heart of Brussels		City of Brussels 50°52′1.2″N 4°19′1.4″E	89 m (292 ft)	N/A	1970	Catholic Church	
24	Blue Tower		City of Brussels 50°49′23.16″N 4°22′8.0″E	88 m (289 ft)	25	1976	Office	
25	Sablon Tower		City of Brussels 50°50′29.10″N 4°21′8.90″E	86 m (282 ft)	27	1968	Office	
26	Belview Tower		City of Brussels 50°50′27″N 4°22′45″E	85.4 m (280 ft)	24	2014	Residential	
27=	Ellipse Building		Schaerbeek 50°51′47″N 4°21′34″E	85 m (279 ft)	23	2006	Office	
27=	Avenue Marius Renard 27		Anderlecht 50°49′39″N 4°17′11″E	85 m (279 ft)	30	1971	Residential	
29	Tour Louise		City of Brussels 50°49′49.08″N 4°21′37.07″E	84 m (275 ft)	23	1965	Office	
30	Résidence Nord		Schaerbeek 50°51′43.97″N 4°21′38.12″E	80 m (262 ft)	28	1976	Residential	
31	Résidence Aigle		Saint-Josse-ten-Noode 50°51′1.8″N 4°20′55.67″E	78 m (256 ft)	27	1969	Residential	
32	Victoria Tower		Saint-Josse-ten-Noode 50°51′21.84″N 4°21′48.29″E	76 m (249 ft)	23	1978	Office	
33	Botanic Building		Saint-Josse-ten-Noode 50°51′21.9″N 4°21′43.73″E	75.5 m (247 ft)	19	1965	Office	

== See also ==
- List of tallest structures in Belgium
