= List of tallest structures in Belgium =

These are lists of the tallest structures in Belgium, sorted by type.

== Tallest skyscrapers ==
The vast majority of Belgium's skyscrapers are located in multi-municipal entity of the Brussels-Capital Region, which includes the City of Brussels, Saint-Josse-ten-Noode and Schaerbeek (territories around the Northern Quarter, the nation's largest cluster of high-rise buildings). The rest of the skyscrapers are scattered among Belgium's secondary cities.

Rank	Name	Place	Height	Floors	Year	Location
1	South Tower	Brussels	150 m (492 ft)	38	1967	50°50′16.35″N 4°20′12.71″E
2	Finance Tower	Brussels	145 m (476 ft)	36	1982	50°51′10.3″N 4°21′52.49″E
3	UP-site	Brussels	142 m (466 ft)	42	2014	50°51′51.74″N 4°21′8.83″E
4	Iris Tower	Brussels	137 m (449 ft)	32	2020	50°51′24.9″N 4°21′40.8″E
5	Rogier Tower	Saint-Josse-ten-Noode	136,9 m (449 ft)	38	2006	50°51′22.75″N 4°21′33.55″E
6	Tour Paradis	Liège	136 m (449 ft)	27	2014	50°37′39″N 5°34′19″E
7	Madou Plaza Tower	Saint-Josse-ten-Noode	120 m (394 ft)	33	1965	50°50′58.11″N 4°22′11.57″E
8	Artevelde Tower	Ghent	119 m (390 ft)	27	2012	51°01′18″N 3°41′13″E
9	Astro Tower	Saint-Josse-ten-Noode	107 m (351 ft)	31	1976	50°51′4.14″N 4°22′11.66″E
10	North Galaxy, Tower 1	Schaerbeek	107 m (351 ft)	28	2004	50°51′41.93″N 4°21′32.82″E
10	North Galaxy, Tower 2	Schaerbeek	107 m (351 ft)	28	2004	50°51′39.57″N 4°21′33.12″E
12	The One	Brussels	105.2 m (345 ft)	22	2019	50°50′36″N 4°22′40″E
13	World Trade Center, Tower 3	Brussels	105 m (344 ft)	28	1983	50°51′38.64″N 4°21′23.08″E
14	Europacentrum	Ostend	104 m (341 ft)	35	1969	51°13′58.86″N 2°54′56.25″E
15	Proximus, Tower 2 (T)	Saint-Josse-ten-Noode	102 m (335 ft)	32	1994	50°51′36.91″N 4°21′31.44″E
15	Proximus, Tower 1 (U)	Schaerbeek	102 m (335 ft)	32	1994	50°51′35.3″N 4°21′28.97″E
17	World Trade Center, Tower 1	Brussels	102 m (335 ft)	28	1972	50°51′43.17″N 4°21′27.54″E
17	World Trade Center, Tower 2	Brussels	102 m (335 ft)	28	1976	50°51′41.56″N 4°21′24.65″E
18	IT Tower	Brussels	102 m (335 ft)	25	1971	50°49′02.00″N 4°22′20.00″E
19	Manhattan Center	Saint-Josse-ten-Noode	102 m (335 ft)	30	1973	50°51′22.13″N 4°21′27.06″E
20	Antwerp Tower	Antwerp	101 m (330 ft)	26	1974	51.21800°N 4.416227°E
21	Residence Brusilia	Schaerbeek	100 m (328 ft)	36	1974	50.86483°N 4.37937°E
22	Covent Garden Tower	Saint-Josse-ten-Noode	100 m (328 ft)	26	2007	50°51′22.13″N 4°21′39.00″E
23	The Hotel Brussels	Brussels	99 m (325 ft)	30	1967	50°50′15.00″N 4°21′26.00″E
24	KBC Tower	Antwerp	96 m (315 ft)	26	1932	51°13′6.93″N 4°24′14.67″E
25	Zenith Tower	Schaerbeek	95 m (312 ft)	22	2009	50°51′50″N 4°21′32″E
26	Belview Tower	Brussels	90 m (295 ft)	24	2014	50°50′27″N 4°22′45″E

== Tallest radio and TV towers ==
Name	Structural type	Place	Pinnacle height	Year	Location
Sint-Pieters-Leeuw Tower	Concrete Tower	Sint-Pieters-Leeuw	300 m (984 ft)	1996	50°46′4.13″N 4°13′27.46″E
VRT Zendstation Egem	Guyed Mast	Pittem	291.4 m (956 ft)	1973	51°1′18.18″N 3°14′8.47″E
Zendmast Ruiselede	Guyed Mast	Ruiselede	287 m (942 ft)	1923	Destroyed - approximate location 51.0792°N 3.3351°E
Wavre Transmitter (MW mast)	Guyed Mast	Wavre	250 m (820 ft)	1973	50°44′52.14″N 4°34′39.32″E
Zendmast Jump Trading Houtem(formerly NAVO-Toren)	Guyed Mast	Houtem	243 m (797 ft)		51°0′38″N 2°34′39.94″E
Wavre Transmitter (TV tower)	Lattice Tower	Wavre	232 m (761 ft)	1983	50°44′27.28″N 4°35′17.13″E
TV Tower Bol d'Air-Ougrée	Lattice Tower	Bol d'Air-Ougrée	210 m (689 ft)		50°34′42.89″N 5°33′7.76″E
VRT Zendmast Genk	Lattice Tower	Genk	200 m (656 ft)		50°56′45.38″N 5°30′31.08″E
Ougrée Telecommunication Tower	Concrete Tower	Ougrée	198 m (650 ft)		50°35′17.95″N 5°33′19.95″E
Léglise Vlessart TV Tower	Lattice Tower	Léglise	185 m (607 ft)	1992	49°48′1.25″N 5°39′10.61″E
Anderlues TV Tower	Lattice Tower	Anderlues	185 m (607 ft)		50°22′55.35″N 4°14′30.27″E
VRT Zendmast Oostvleteren	Lattice Tower	Oostvleteren	170 m (560 ft)		50°56′43.17″N 2°43′37.77″E
VRT Zendmast Schoten	Lattice Tower	Schoten	167 m (548 ft)		51°17′33.15″N 4°32′24.24″E
Wolvertem transmitter, main mast	Guyed Mast	Meise	165 m (541 ft)		50°58′41.54″N 4°18′5.31″E
RTBF Profondeville	Lattice Tower	Riviere	164 m (538 ft)		50°21′17.93″N 4°51′33.76″E
RTBF Emetteur Froidmont	Lattice Tower	Froidmont	163 m (535 ft) or 157 m (515 ft)		50°35′24.73″N 3°19′6.67″E
Houdeng Radio Tower	Lattice Tower	Houdeng	156 m (512 ft)		50°29′4.69″N 4°8′27.52″E
Kapellen TV Tower	Lattice Tower	Kapellen	153 m (502 ft)		51°19′57″N 4°24′55″E

== Other buildings and structures ==
Name	Place	Height	Location
Fina Antwerp Olefins Flare 1	Antwerp	211 m (692 ft)	51°15′57.01″N 4°19′8.19″E
Fina Antwerp Olefins Flare 2	Antwerp	205 m (673 ft)	51°16′26.17″N 4°19′23.23″E
Fina Antwerp Olefins Flare 3	Antwerp	204 m (669 ft)	51°16′10.4″N 4°19′1.19″E
Estinnes Enercon-126 wind turbines	Estinnes	199 m (653 ft)	50°24′41.2″N 4°04′49.62″E; 50°24′58.75″N 4°05′23.09″E; 50°25′12.06″N 4°05′15.59″E; 50°25′15.05″N 4°04′50.6″E
Fina Antwerp Olefins Flare 4	Antwerp	185 m (607 ft)	51°15′23.16″N 4°19′48.15″E
Doel Nuclear Power Station cooling towers	Doel	176 m (577 ft)	51°19′35.67″N 4°15′40.37″E; 51°19′29.18″N 4°15′43.15″E
Doel Schelde Powerline Crossing towers	Doel	170 m (560 ft)	51°20′58.15″N 4°16′19.65″E; 51°20′23.02″N 4°15′56.71″E
Pylons at Antwerp Harbour	Antwerp	164 m (538 ft)	51°15′46.47″N 4°21′30″E; 51°15′32.11″N 4°20′57.78″E
Tihange Nuclear Power Station chimneys	Tihange	161 m (528 ft)	50°32′4.08″N 5°16′17.48″E; 50°32′9.11″N 5°16′22.37″E; 50°32′6.08″N 5°16′35.83″E
Tihange Nuclear Power Station cooling towers	Tihange	159 m (522 ft)	50°31′59.62″N 5°16′45.23″E; 50°31′59.62″N 5°16′45.23″E; 50°31′57.19″N 5°16′31.1″E; 50°32′18.8″N 5°16′1.36″E
Hoboken chimneys	Antwerp	155 m (509 ft)	51°10′0.34″N 4°20′4.77″E; 51°9′57.45″N 4°20′2.66″E
Electricity Pylon near ExxonMobil Chemical	Antwerp	155 m (509 ft)	51°14′38.06″N 4°20′2.78″E
Umicore chimney	Antwerp	152 m (499 ft)	51°10′2.12″N 4°20′6.3″E
Antwerp Wind Turbine	Antwerp	150 m (490 ft)	51°16′34.15″N 4°19′58.94″E
Awirp Power Station chimneys	Awirp	150 m (490 ft)	50°35′4.97″N 5°25′8.46″E; 50°35′4.52″N 5°25′5.56″E; 50°35′4.05″N 5°25′2.42″E
Beaumont Wind Turbines	Beaumont	150 m (490 ft)	50°13′28″N 4°19′16″E; 50°13′23″N 4°19′49″E; 50°13′21″N 4°20′19″E; 50°13′12″N 4°19′22″E; 50°13′08″N 4°19′45″E; 50°12′58″N 4°19′12″E; 50°12′51″N 4°19′52″E; 50°12′43″N 4°20′15″E; 50°12′36″N 4°19′48″E
Berloz Wind Turbine	Berloz	150 m (490 ft)	50°41′50″N 5°11′14″E
Bievre Wind Turbine	Bièvre	150 m (490 ft)	49°57′12″N 5°1′10″E
Engis chimney	Engis	150 m (490 ft)	50°34′28.58″N 5°23′12.3″E
Hasselt Wind Turbines	Hasselt	150 m (490 ft)	50°56′21.56″N 5°22′15.24″E; 50°56′21.7″N 5°22′6.49″E 50°56′21.92″N 5°21′57.79″E
Kallo Wind Turbine	Kallo	150 m (490 ft)	51°16′11.04″N 4°15′27.62″E
Nike wind turbines	Laakdal	150 m (490 ft)	51°06′2.98″N 5°5′2.22″E; 51°05′56.99″N 5°5′25.19″E; 51°05′52.51″N 5°5′44.1″E; 51°05′41.18″N 5°5′50.5″E; 51°05′47.95″N 5°5′18.07″E; 51°05′49.81″N 5°4′49.85″E
Philippeville Wind Turbines	Philippeville	150 m (490 ft)	50°10′30″N 4°30′11″E; 50°10′28″N 4°29′48″E; 50°10′26″N 4°29′26″E; 50°10′24″N 4°29′03″E; 50°10′19″N 4°30′04″E; 50°10′12″N 4°29′22″E; 50°10′10″N 4°28′59″E
Rodenhuize Power Station chimney	Ghent	150 m (490 ft)	51°8′3.74″N 3°46′37.38″E
Ronquières inclined plane observation tower	Ronquières	150 m (490 ft)	50°35′27.56″N 4°13′11.36″E
Ruien Power Station chimneys	Ruien	150 m (490 ft)	50°47′1.16″N 3°29′24.44″E; 50°46′59.36″N 3°29′26.08″E; 50°46′57.86″N 3°29′27.88″E
Sainte Ode wind turbines	Sainte Ode	150 m (490 ft)	50°00′51″N 5°36′49″E
Zelzate chimney	Zelzate	150 m (490 ft)	51°11′7.46″N 3°47′38.31″E
Mechelen-Zuid Water Tower	Mechelen	143 m (469 ft)	51°0′39.95″N 4°27′47.14″E
Cathedral of Our Lady	Antwerp	123 m (404 ft)	51°13′13.7″N 4°24′2.2″E
Church of Our Lady	Bruges	122 m (400 ft)	51°12′17.16″N 3°13′28.31″E
Saint Catherine's Church	Hoogstraten	105 m (344 ft)	51°24′3″N 4°45′43″E
Palace of Justice of Brussels	Brussels	104 m (341 ft)	50°50′11.64″N 4°21′06.01″E
Atomium	Brussels	102 m (335 ft)	50°53′41.91″N 4°20′29.06″E
Saint Martin's Cathedral	Ypres	102 m (335 ft)	50°51′6.11″N 2°53′3.88″E
Saint Vincent's Church	Eeklo	99 m (325 ft)	51°11′6.35″N 3°33′58.06″E
Church of Our Lady of Laeken	Brussels	99 m (325 ft)	50°52′42.98″N 4°21′21.23″E
Saint Rumbold's Cathedral	Mechelen	97 m (318 ft)	51°01′44″N 4°28′42″E
Brussels Town Hall	Brussels	96 m (315 ft)	50°50′47.73″N 4°21′7.14″E
Pont de Wandre	Liège	96 m (315 ft)	50°40′26.69″N 5°38′36.57″E

== Gallery ==
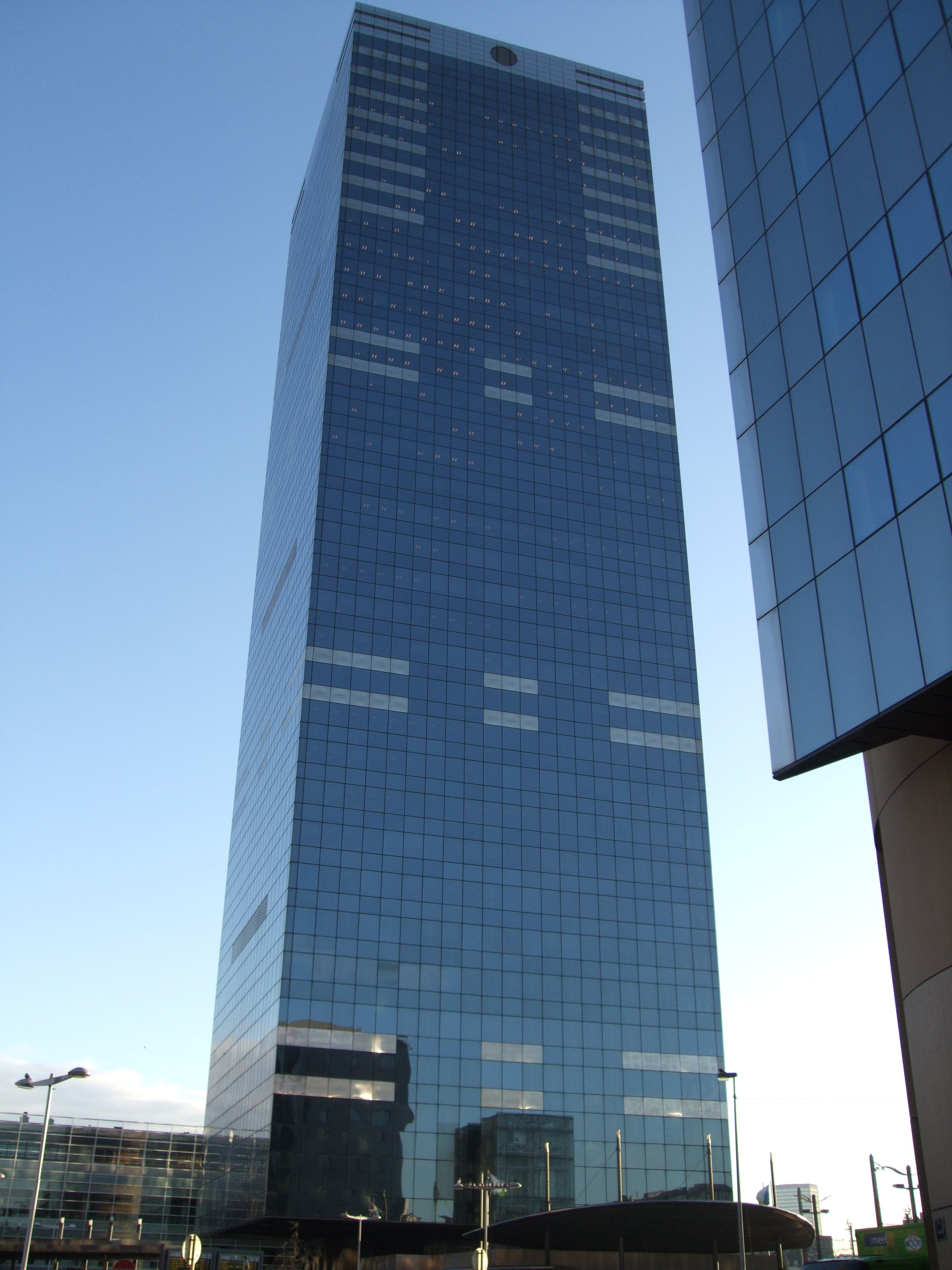
The South Tower, the tallest building in Belgium and formerly the tallest in the European Economic Community (EEC)

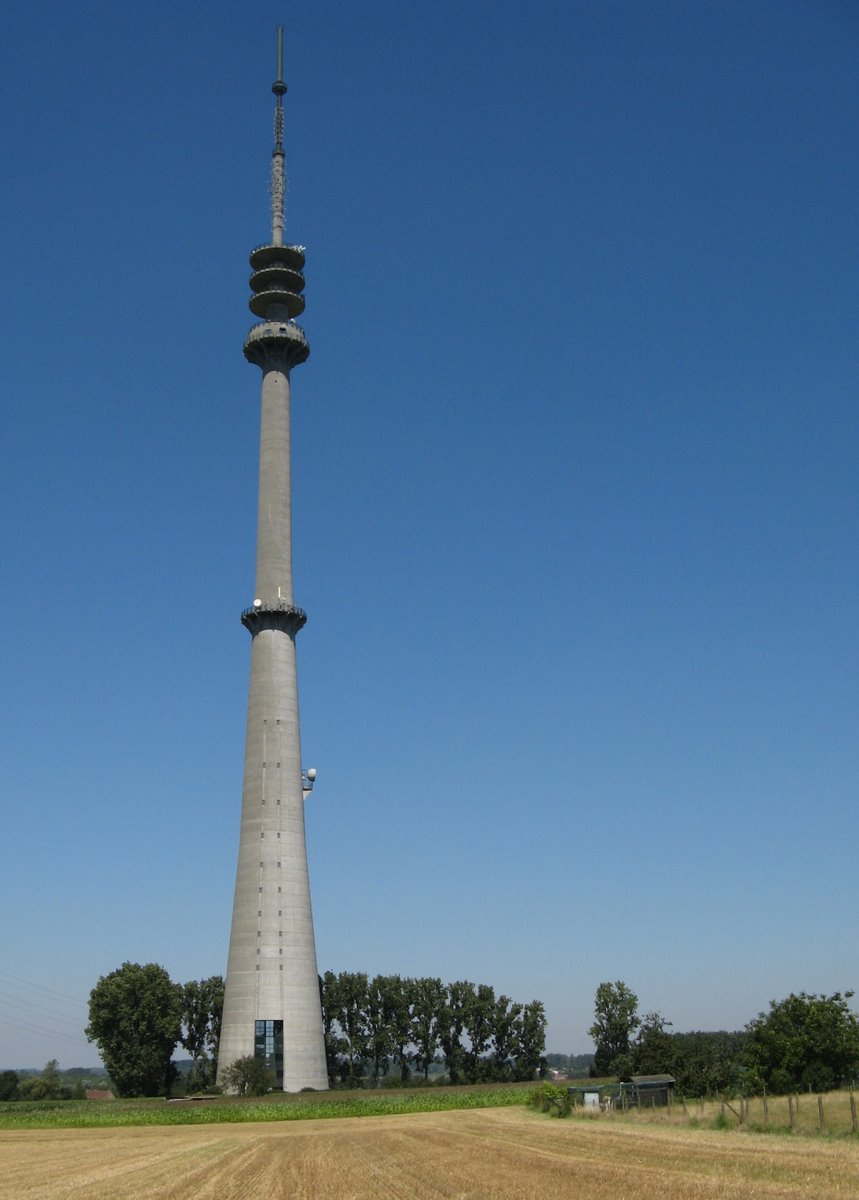
The communications tower in Sint-Pieters-Leeuw

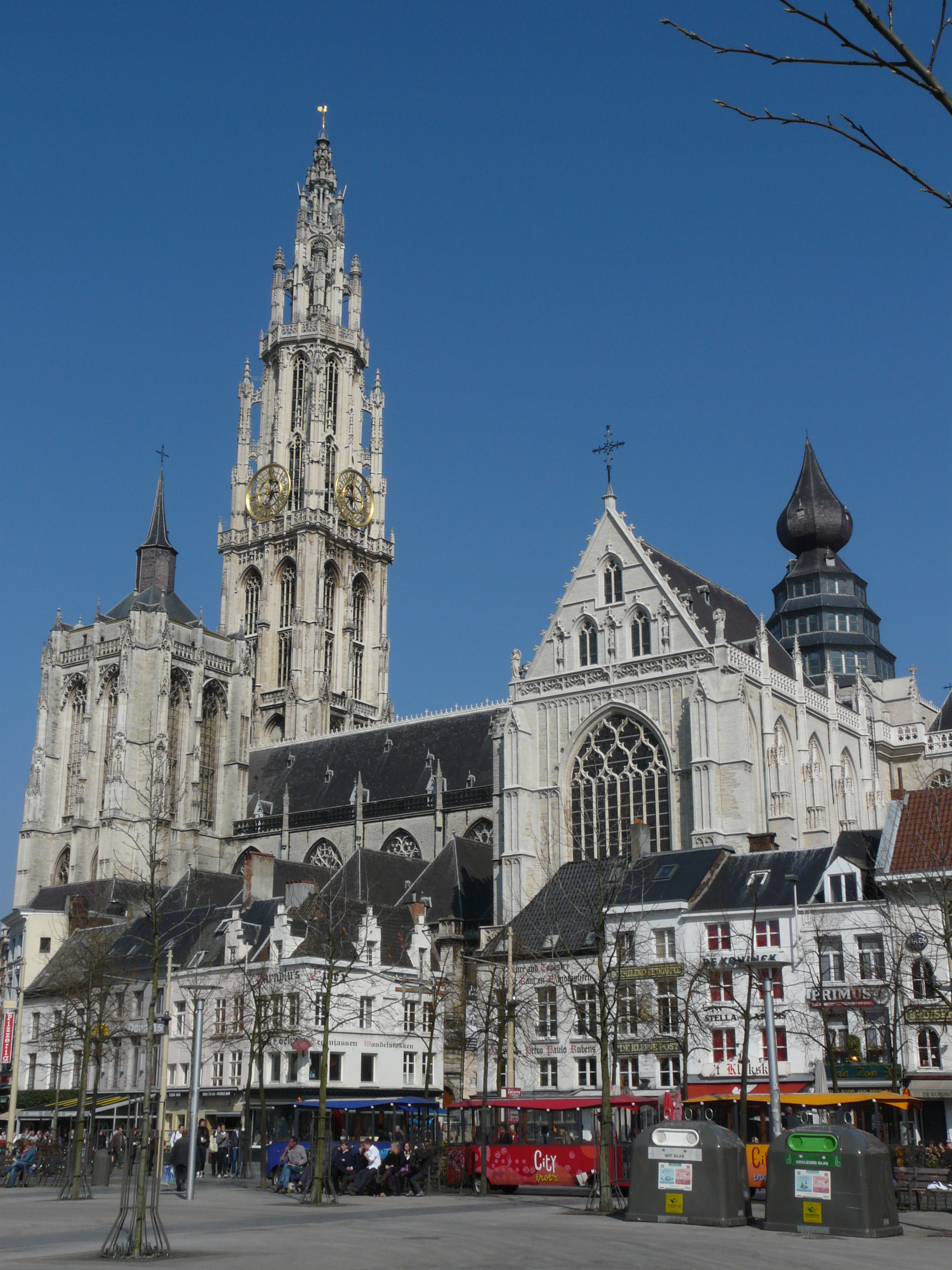
The Cathedral of Our Lady in Antwerp

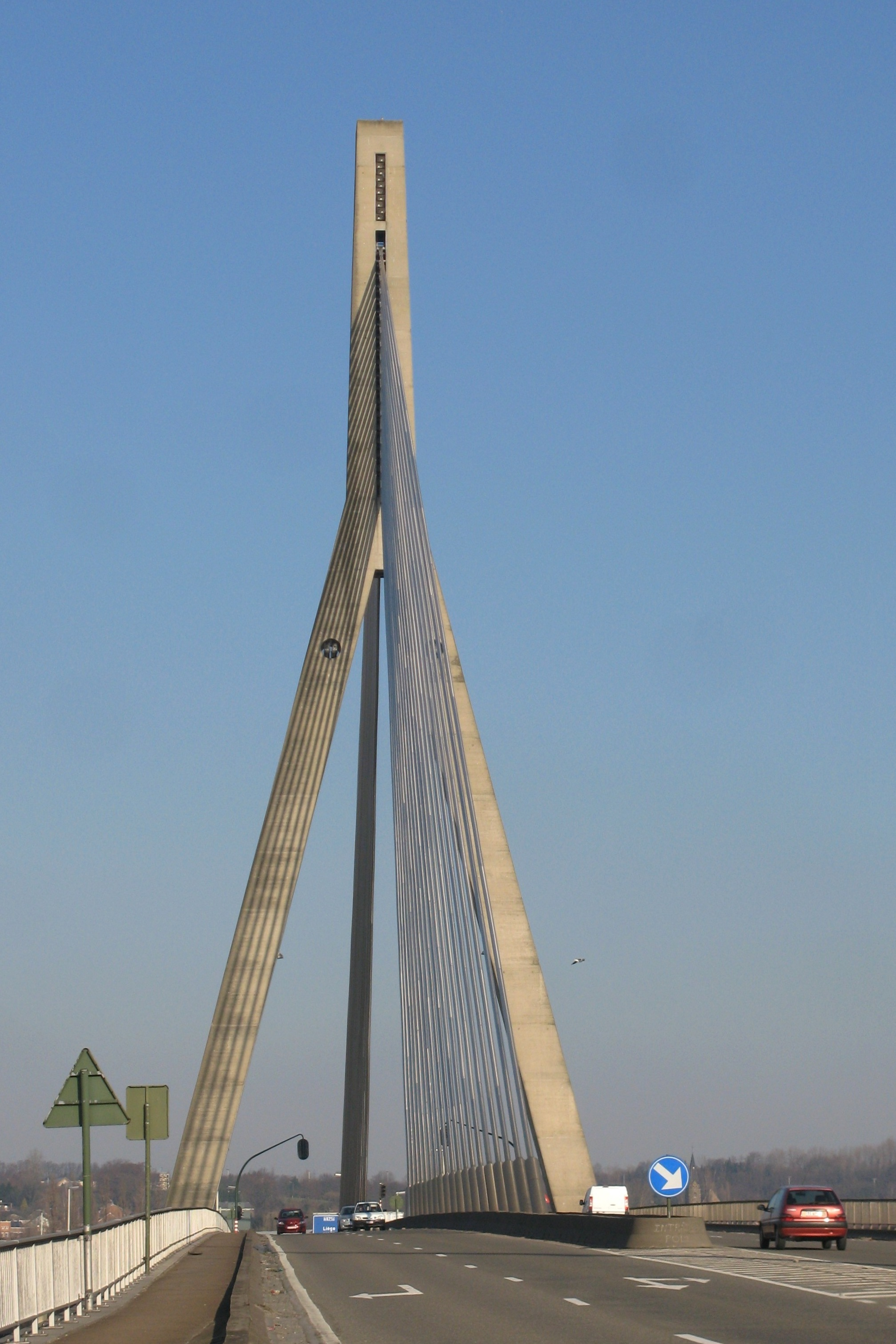
The Pont de Wandre in Liège

== See also ==
- List of tallest buildings and structures in Brussels
