= South Tower (Brussels) =

Skyscraper in Brussels, Belgium

- Tour du Midi (French); Zuidertoren (Dutch)
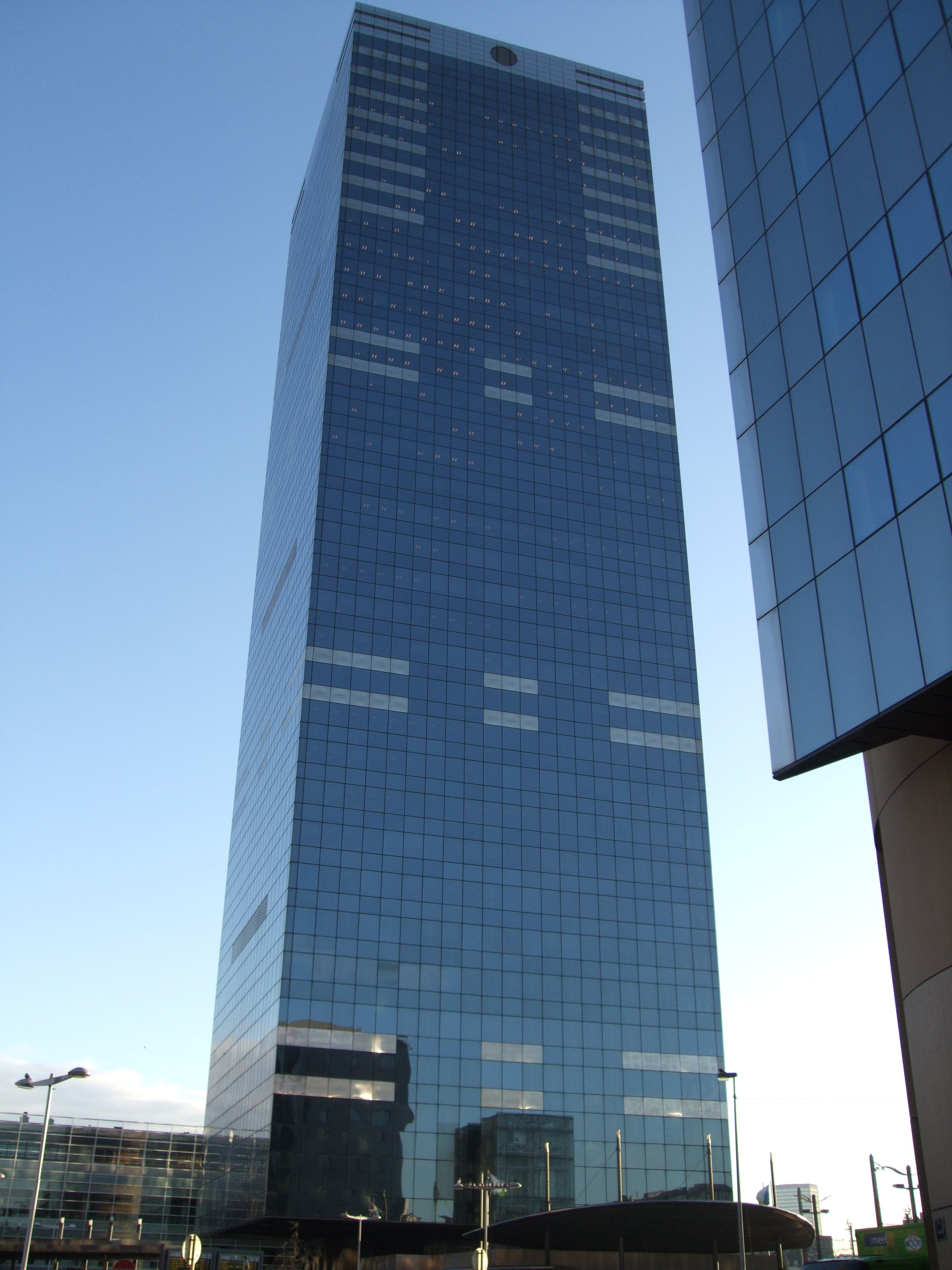
- The South Tower seen from the Place Victor Horta/Victor Hortaplein
- Interactive map of the South Tower area
- Alternative names: Midi Tower

General information
- Status: Completed
- Type: Government offices
- Architectural style: Modernism
- Location: Avenue Paul-Henri Spaak / Paul-Henri Spaaklaan, 1060 Saint-Gilles, Brussels-Capital Region, Belgium
- Coordinates: 50.83778°N 4.3375°E
- Construction started: 1962
- Completed: 1967
- Renovated: 1995–1996
- Cost: BEF 1.4 billion
- Owner: Belgian Pensions Administration

Height
- Antenna spire: 171 m (561 ft)
- Roof: 150 m (490 ft)

Technical details
- Floor count: 38; 3 below ground
- Floor area: 85,630 m^{2} (921,700 sq ft)

Design and construction
- Architects: Michel Jaspers & Partners

The South Tower or Midi Tower (French: Tour du Midi; Dutch: Zuidertoren) is a 38-storey, 150 metres (490 ft) office skyscraper built between 1962 and 1967 in Brussels, Belgium. The tower is the tallest building in Belgium, and was the tallest in the European Economic Community (EEC) upon completion, until it was surpassed by Tour Montparnasse in Paris in 1972.

The South Tower stands adjacent to Brussels-South railway station. The building's façade was reclad in 1995–96 with unitised glass panels using double glass solarbel silver, and it can accommodate about 2,500 office workers. It was built for the Belgian Federal Pensions Service (FPS), which still occupies it today, and it is thus often also called the Pensions Tower (French: Tour des Pensions; Dutch: Pensioentoren).

== History ==
Construction of the South Tower began in 1962 and ended in 1967, as part of the Brusselisation movement of the 1960s and 1970s in Belgium. The technique used to build the South Tower was bold and unique. Each floor of the tower is suspended from a base that forms the tower's central core.

This central core contains the staircases, lifts, toilets, and other technical rooms. It occupies 40% of the building's surface area, leaving 60% for office space. Furthermore, the base does not rest on the ground but on foundations equipped with jacks capable of righting the tower in the event of an earthquake. The building has 37 floors supported by main beams attached to the central core like branches clinging to their trunk. There are 144 of these beams, each 40 metres (130 ft) long and weighing 40 tonnes (88,000 lb).

This technique eliminates the need for columns, freeing up large usable spaces. The main beams are alternated between even and odd floors to avoid connection problems at their intersections. These beams were prestressed during their manufacture using a technique developed by the engineer Lipski: Preflex. This technique is used to prevent deformations due to the weight of the floors. Like the Berlaymont building (housing the European Commission's offices), the tower is anchored to the ground only by its central core. Exposed at its base to a height of 8 metres (26 ft), it is surrounded by basins whose water supplies the air conditioning cooling system for the lower floors.

Metal sculptures by Jean-Pierre Ghysels and Jacques Moeschal animate the water jets with successive bursts. A low, very long, three-storey building (the "Block B") is connected to it by a walkway (which thus joins the second floor of each of the buildings). In 1996, renovation work began on the building. The glass façades were replaced and the interior was brought up to current standards: asbestos was removed and the electrical system was upgraded. The reception area and visitor space were also modernised.

== Gallery ==
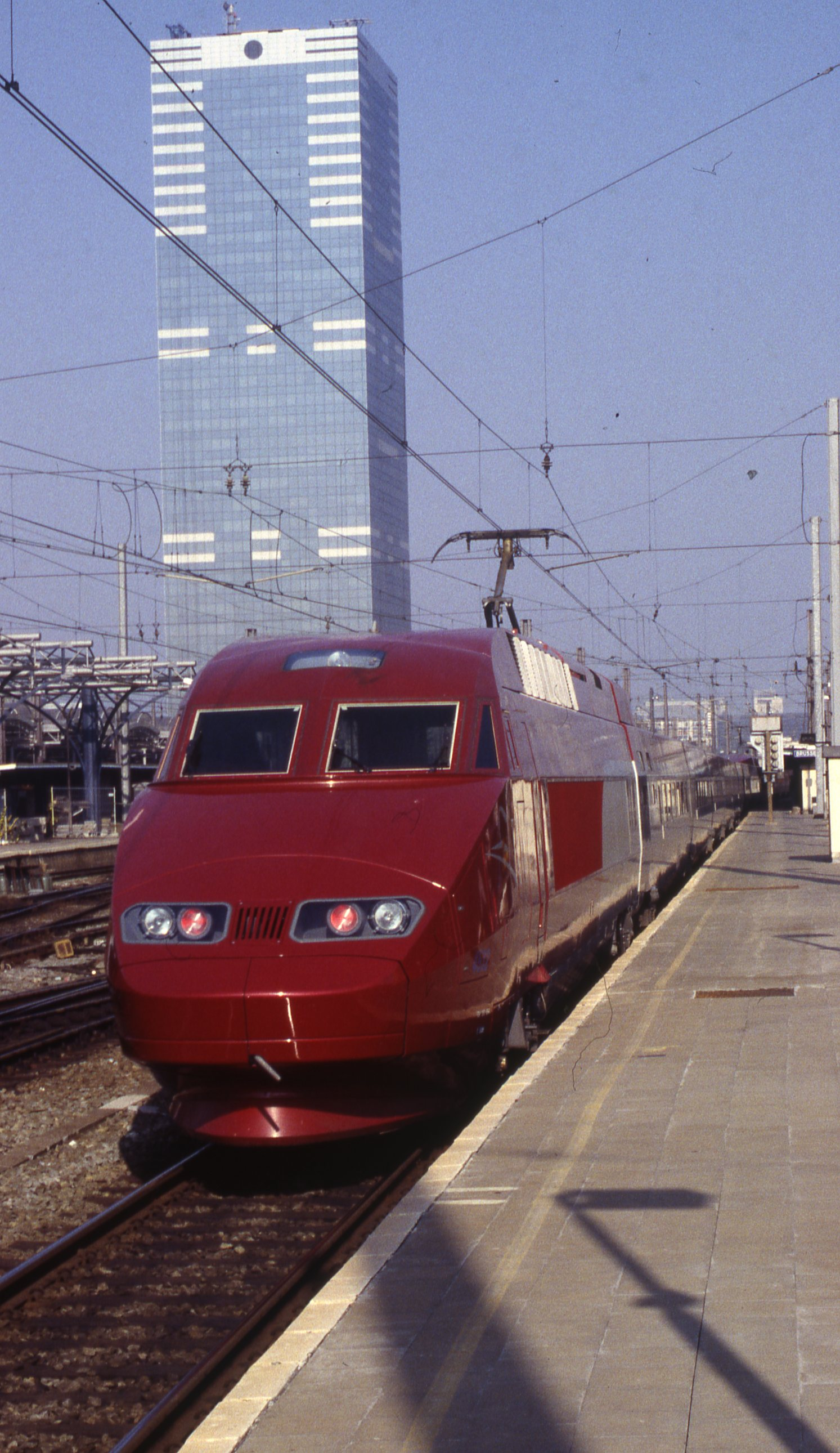
The South Tower seen from Brussels-South railway station in 1996, with a Thalys in the foreground

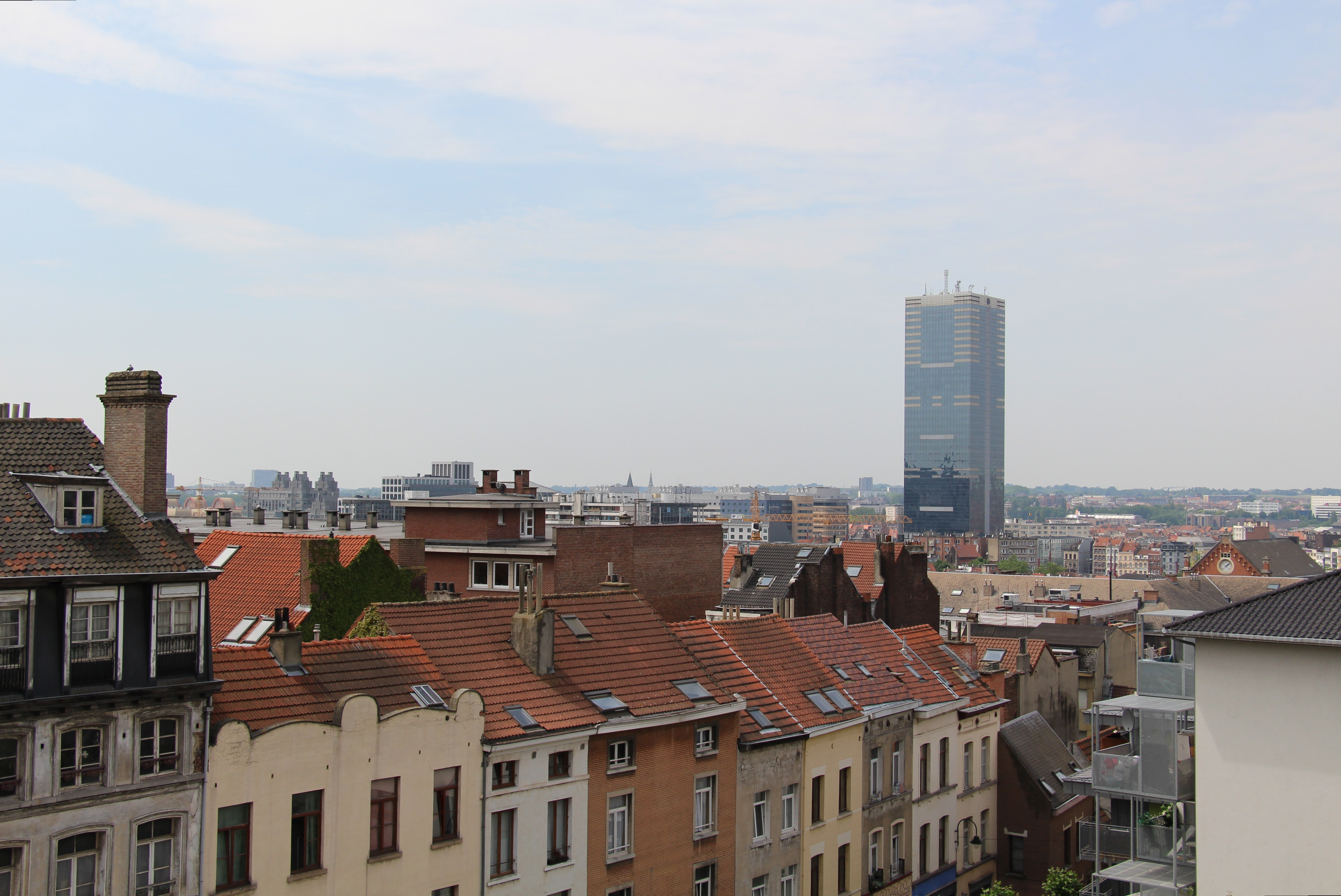
The South Tower seen from the Palace of Justice on the Place Poelaert/Poelaertplein

The water feature at the bottom of the tower

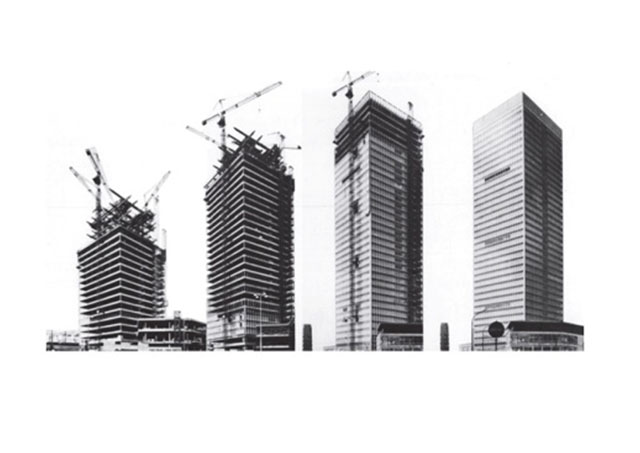
Vignette with sketches of the construction timelapse

== See also ==
- List of tallest structures in Belgium
- List of tallest buildings and structures in Brussels
- List of tallest buildings in the European Union

Records
Preceded by Madou Plaza Tower	Tallest building in Belgium; 1967–present 150 metres (490 ft)	Incumbent
