= Tour Paradis =

Skyscraper in Liège, Belgium

Coordinates: 50.6274°N 5.5720°E

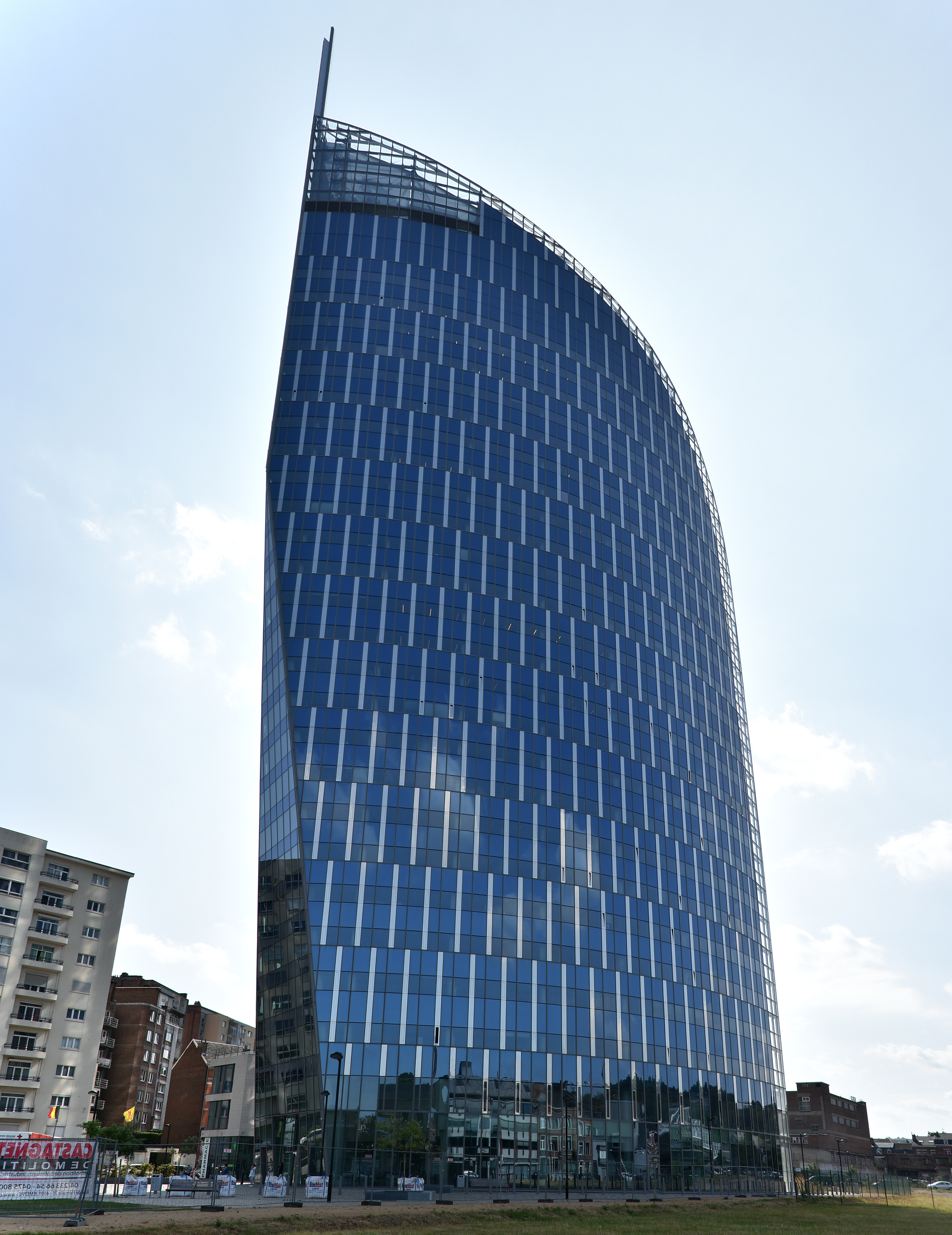

General information
- Status: Completed
- Type: Office
- Location: Rue de Fragnée 2, Liège, Belgium, Belgium
- Construction started: 2012
- Completed: 2014

Height
- Roof: 136 m (446 ft)

Technical details
- Structural system: Reinforced concrete
- Floor count: 27
- Floor area: 52,502 m^{2} (565,000 sq ft)
- Lifts/elevators: 8

Design and construction
- Architect: Jaspers-Eyers Architects
- Developer: Befimmo (Fedimmo sa/nv)
- Structural engineer: Bureau d`etudes Greisch
- Main contractor: Interbuild

Tour Paradis (pronounced [tuʁ paʁadi], Paradise Tower), also known as Tour des Finances de Liège (French pronunciation: [tuʁ de finɑ̃s də ljɛʒ], Financial Tower of Liège), is a 136-metre office skyscraper located in the Guillemins area of Liège, Belgium. Designed by Jaspers-Eyers Architects, i.s.m. and Bureau d'Architecture, Greisch cvba, it was constructed from 2012 to 2014. With the tower hosting 27 floors, it is the tallest skyscraper in Wallonia and the sixth tallest in Belgium.

Following the building's inauguration in 2015, it became the workplace of more than 1,000 employees from the Belgian Federal Pensions Service (FPS), and is thus also called Le Centre de Finances. In 2022, it was announced in the media that the tower was underoccupied due to the generalization of homeworking that started during the COVID-19 pandemic in Belgium.

The Paradis tower is located close to the Meuse in the Guillemins district, on the border of the Fragnée district. It fits into the axis created by the Liège-Guillemins station, Place Pierre Clerdent, the Guillemins esplanade, the La Belle Liégeoise footbridge, the La Boverie Park, the Vennes bridge and the Médiacité. It is served by several bus lines, some of which were replaced in April 2025 by a tram line. On the other side of the Meuse, it faces Nicolas Schöffer's cybernetic tower, a monumental work from 1961.

== History ==
=== Background ===
The Finance Tower in Liège would probably never have had its place in another Walloon agglomeration such as Namur, Charleroi or Mons, and for one reason: these cities have no history of vertical architecture. While Liège, since the late 1930s, has focused on vertical construction to combat the city's depopulation, exacerbated after its partial destruction during the First and Second World Wars, other Walloon cities have remained stuck in more modest building heights for several reasons: Charleroi occupies a larger area than Liège with a less pronounced topography, and Namur also has a larger area than Liège but stands out with a smaller population (around one hundred thousand inhabitants in the 21st-century compared to approximately 200,000 for Liège and Charleroi). But Liège stands out once again: steep terrain, a small area, and an urban area of over 600,000 inhabitants, making it the third largest in Belgium after Brussels and Antwerp.

The need to build upwards then became more than necessary to accommodate middle-income workers and laborers in the city center. Thus, during the 20th-century, several towers were built, such as the Belvédère residence in 1963, the Le Petit Paradis residence in 1937, the Kennedy residence in 1970, the Atlas tower in 1978 and the Simenon tower in 1963. In addition to the towers, there were also numerous residences, some reaching fifteen or even twenty stories, surrounding the main streets and avenues of the city on both sides, such as along the quays or the Avroy–Sauvenière axis.

=== Project ===
Following the construction of the new Guillemins station, the City of Liège wanted to build a large esplanade between the train station and the Meuse River, which necessitated the demolition of the building occupied by the Finance Department. In 2007, the Buildings Agency therefore launched a competition to relocate the Finance Department employees to Liège, as the old premises also contained asbestos. Five bids were submitted: two for the Val-Benoît site, one near Angleur station, one on Rue du Plan Incliné, and one on Rue Paradis. However, the Agency failed to publish the call for tenders at the European level and therefore had to cancel the procedure.

A new call for tenders was launched in 2008, requiring candidates to obtain a planning certificate issued by the City of Liège. Of the six candidates, only two obtained this certificate: Fedimmo, which wanted to build a tower at the end of the Guillemins esplanade, and the SNCB (Belgian National Railways), which opted for a block of flats along Rue du Plan Incliné. The railway company's certificate came with a long list of impossible conditions, as it was only issued the day before the final submission deadline. The SNCB withdrew its bid, leaving the public transport authority with only one submission to review. Fedimmo was awarded the contract.

The public inquiry revealed that local residents opposed the construction of the tower. Eighty-seven objections were registered, particularly concerning the tower's size. Consequently, the Walloon Region mandated that the tower's tip be reoriented to move it further away from other buildings and that the façade visible from the train station be redesigned, accentuating the curves. These changes led to a new public inquiry and the granting of a new permit by Minister Philippe Henry in 2012. Construction began.

Local residents and the SNCB (National Railway Company of Belgium) lodge appeals with the Belgian Council of State, resulting in a four-month work stoppage. The residents withdraw their appeals and the administrative court rejects the SNCB's appeal.

=== Costs ===
The federal government's investment by the Buildings Agency amounts to some 95 million euros for an occupancy of 27,5 years and generating an annual rental income of 5,9 million euros, i.e. an initial gross yield of 6.2%. In terms of energy costs, the modern-style tower meets very high technical and energy standards, which allows for a reduction in its costs compared to the old offices of the Finance Department in Liège.

== Toponymy ==
In the Guillemins district, many elements recall the name Paradis; this is notably the case with the Rue Paradis and the Petit Paradis residence, opposite the Finance Tower. Today, we therefore find a new architectural element, the Tour Paradis. This name comes directly from a chapel, destroyed in 1881, named Paradis, which stood near the current tower.

== Construction ==
=== Site ===
Construction work took place between March 2012 and December 2014. The construction of the tower requires the assembly of a 151-meter crane and another of 131 meters. These structures are anchored to the building as it is raised. The configuration of the district limits the movement of the cranes.

The construction site is divided into two parts:

- Earthworks for the tower, November 2012.
- Structural work and closure, March 2012-February 2014.
- Techniques and finishing touches, November 2012-December 2014.
- Start of diaphragm walls, April 2012
- Earthworks begin, May 2012
- Construction of the basements has begun, December 2012
- Construction of the upper floors has begun, May 2013
- Start of facade cladding, August 2013
- Start of finishing work, September 2013
- End of construction, December 2014
- Moving to the new address, March 2015
- Demolition of the existing building, July 2015, for a period of approximately 6 months
- With an area of 52,946 m2, the tower was inaugurated in 2015 and became one of the largest landmarks of the Cité ardente.

=== Engineering ===
Standing at 136 meters tall, including its spire, the Finance Tower isn't a high-rise like those found in New York, Shanghai or Dubai; however, from a European perspective (excluding Russia), its height can be considered significant, especially when considering towers built in Belgium. The Finance Tower in Liège is the fifth tallest in Belgium, surpassed by a mere 14 meters by the tallest tower, the South Tower in Brussels. It is, however, the tallest tower in Belgium outside the Brussels-Capital Region, reflecting the revitalization of the city of Liège and its reputation as the economic capital of Wallonia. To give the tower a greater height effect, it ends with a slender point towards the sky and a spire 18 meters high.

=== Technologies ===
As with most new tower constructions in the early 2010s, the Liège tower was built using high-performance concrete called C80/95 for the columns. The use of this concrete for the columns creates deformations with the central core. To limit these negative impacts, continuous calculations were carried out during the construction of the tower. Thus, after each concrete pour or placement of a prefabricated element, a calculation on the long-term impact of differential deformation phenomena was carried out. The building received BREEAM “Excellent” certification in 2015 with a score of 74%, i.e. excellent, in the Offices category.

The central core is equipped with two sub-cores connected at each floor by one-meter by one-meter lintels and functions as a Virendeel beam, allowing for greater wind resistance. The dynamic wind study shows that the tower can undergo a displacement, at its height, of 10.25 centimeters, or 1/1000 of its above-ground height. The maximum characteristic acceleration that the tower's occupants could experience is then 0.193 m/s². As the tower occupies office spaces, the comfort criterion is limited to 1.05 m/s², meaning that the tower very well meets the comfort standard, five times better than the imposed standards.

=== Materials & features ===
The tower's foundations rest directly on a shale bedrock at a depth of twelve meters. The Paradis Tower is 136 meters tall. It is shaped like a half-oval, an iron, or a boat that rises and flares out towards a sloping summit. It has three underground levels and 26 floors, all topped by a spire. The building's structure is made of reinforced concrete. The floors, beams, and columns are made of prefabricated concrete. Due to its proximity to the Meuse River and a water table, pumps are installed in the basements to remove the seeping water. The tower's facade was constructed using photovoltaic glazing.

== Usage ==
On December 12, 2014, two years after the start of construction of the tower, the building was handed over to the tower's tenant, the Belgian Federal Government Buildings Agency (the tower housed the civil servants of the Ministry of Finance). This 27.5-year lease provided employment for some 1,100 civil servants.

Basement (on three levels): car park (325 spaces, including 26 reserved for service vehicles) and bicycle parking (50 spaces) Ground floor: Entrance hall, Restaurant First floor : Classrooms Floors 2-17 : Offices 18th - 19th floors : Not defined 20th - 24th floors : Offices 25th floor : Offices, Technical areas 26th floor : Technical floor A total of 1,124 people will work there

The 25th floor is open to the public every year during Heritage Days, it offers a panoramic view of the centre of Liège from the tip of the building.

== Controversies ==
The consequences of the tower's construction, included in the Guillemins district development project along with the train station, footbridge, and eco-district, are the destruction of several buildings with a certain heritage value in the eyes of the people of Liège. Thus, in 2017, the Rigo house (listed as Walloon heritage ) was demolished; it was located directly opposite the Finance Tower and was an eyesore in the development project, including for the future Liège tram line.

Regarding parking in the neighborhood, according to the Liège urban planning summary report: the former finance buildings (rue Paradis) had 145 underground spaces and 600 surface spaces, totaling 745 spaces (page 60), but this was already insufficient and regularly overcrowded. However, the region reduced the initially planned spaces to 325 in order to encourage the use of public transport and active mobility: this shortfall exacerbates the neighborhood's congestion to the detriment of local residents, who are already penalized by commuters from the train station. Conversely, in the same report, on page 68, the region requires all residential and commercial buildings to have a sufficient number of parking spaces relative to their occupants. This principle was not applied to the Ministry of Finance, despite the intervention of unions to defend the interests of civil servants. Local residents and employees of the Ministry of Finance are the first victims of this shortfall of 420 parking spaces, which exacerbates the elimination of parking spaces on the old roads around the station.

== Gallery ==
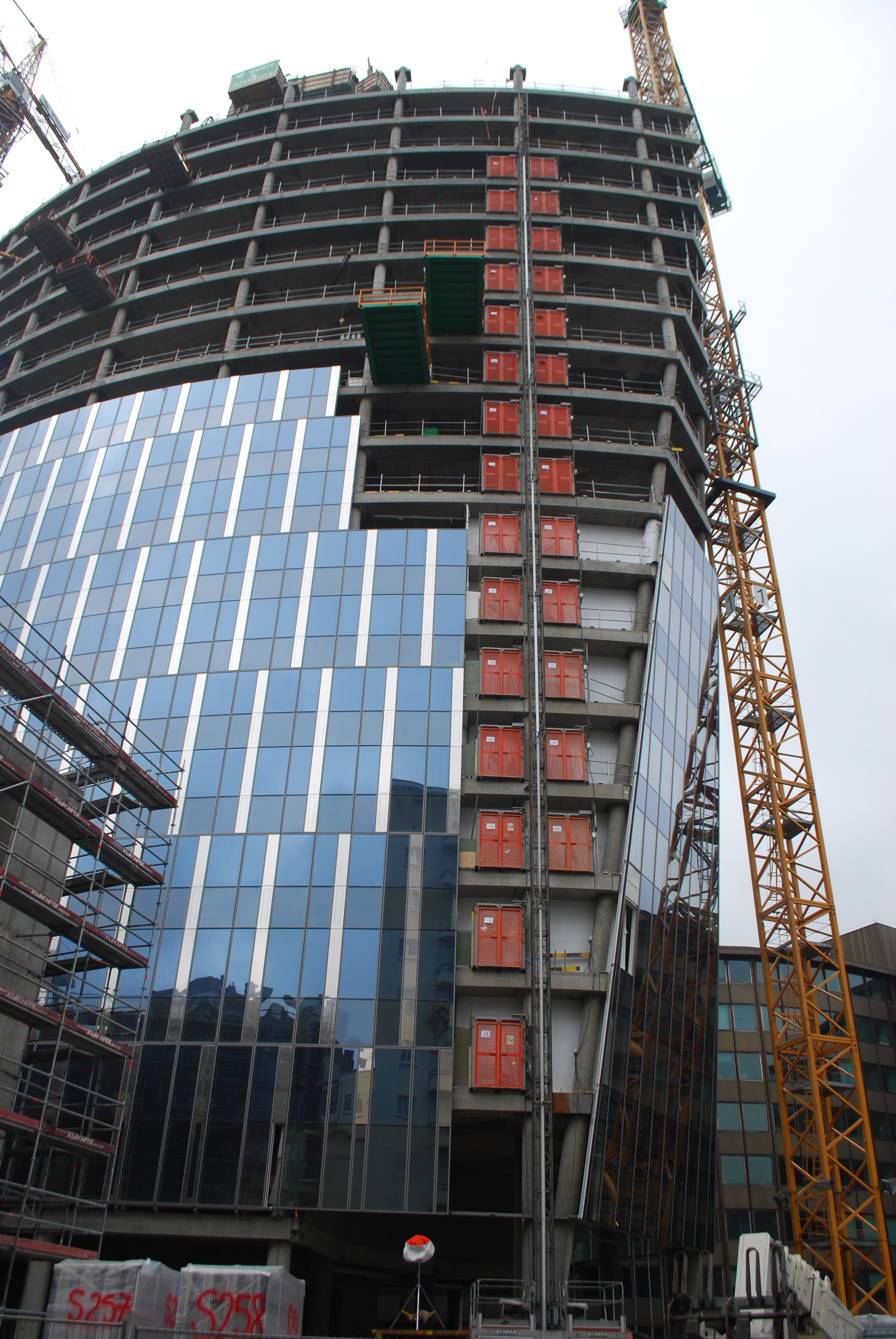
The tower under construction in December 2013

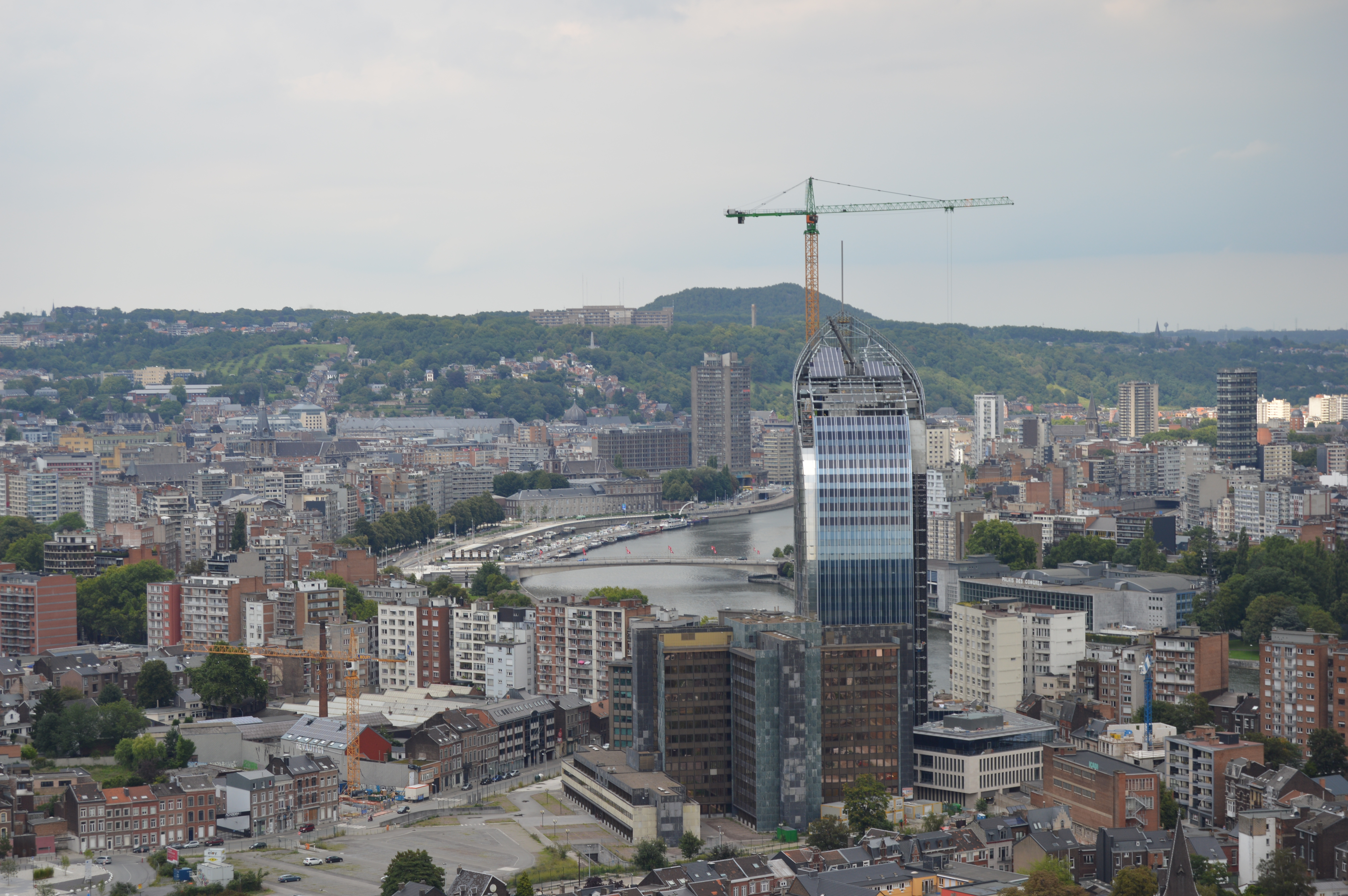
Rear view during construction in August 2014

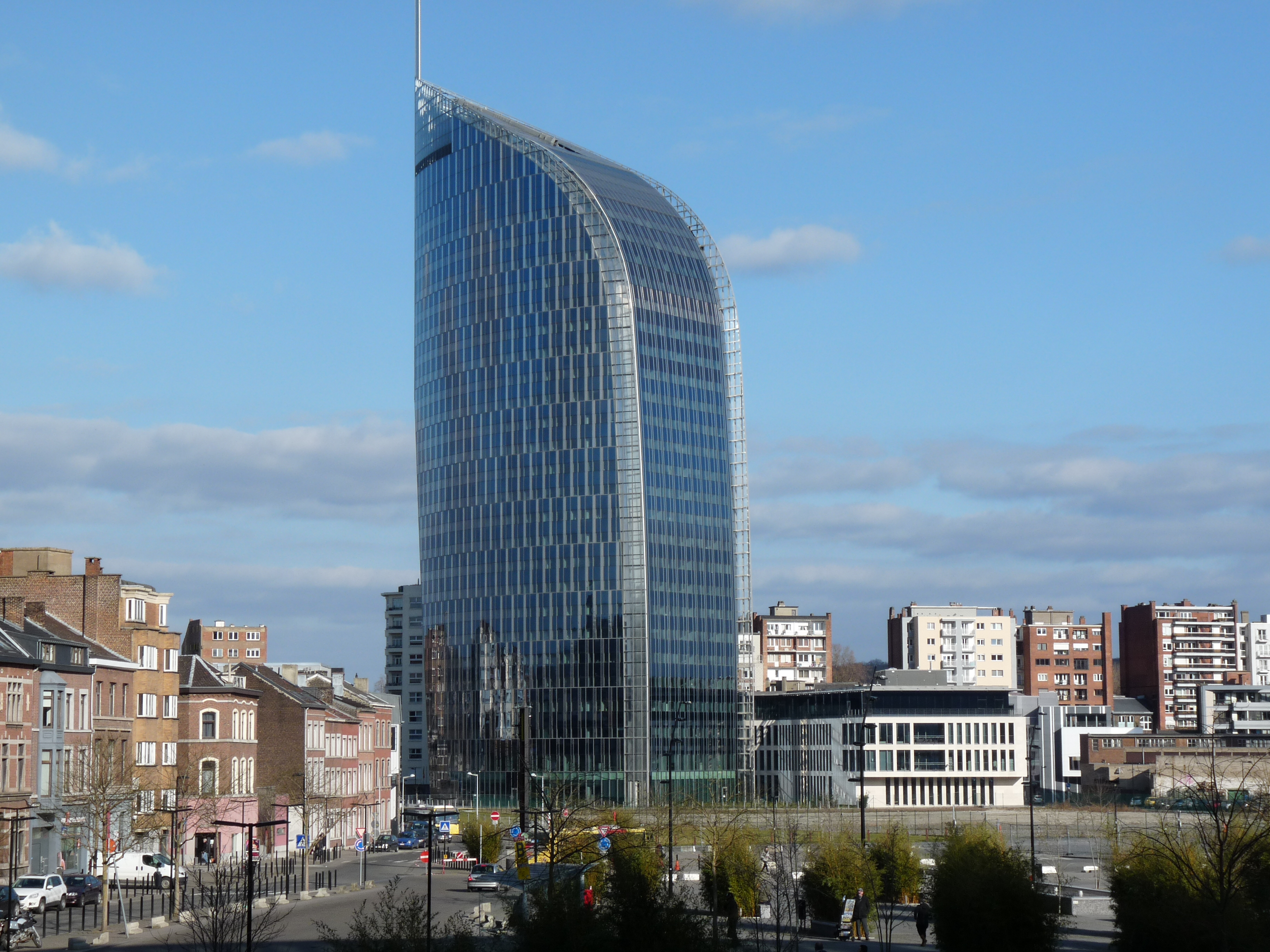
Profile view from Liège-Guillemins railway station

== Sources ==
- Charlier, Sébastien; Frankignoulle, Pierre (2012), "Vers une architecture verticale. Le cas de Liège" (PDF), Cahiers Nouveaux (Les) (in French), vol. 81, pp. 41–46
- Leroy, A.; Demortier, L.; de Goyet, V. de Ville (2016). "De la tour des Finances de Liège à d'autres projets de bâtiments de grande hauteur". Academic Journal of Civil Engineering (in French). 34 (1): 97–105.
- Roussel, Dylan; et al. (2020), "Valeur portées par les représentations numériques d'un bâtiment (le cas de la maison Rigo)" (PDF), Mémoire de fin d'études, Université de Liège (in French), Liège
