= Iris Tower =

Skyscraper in Brussels, Belgium

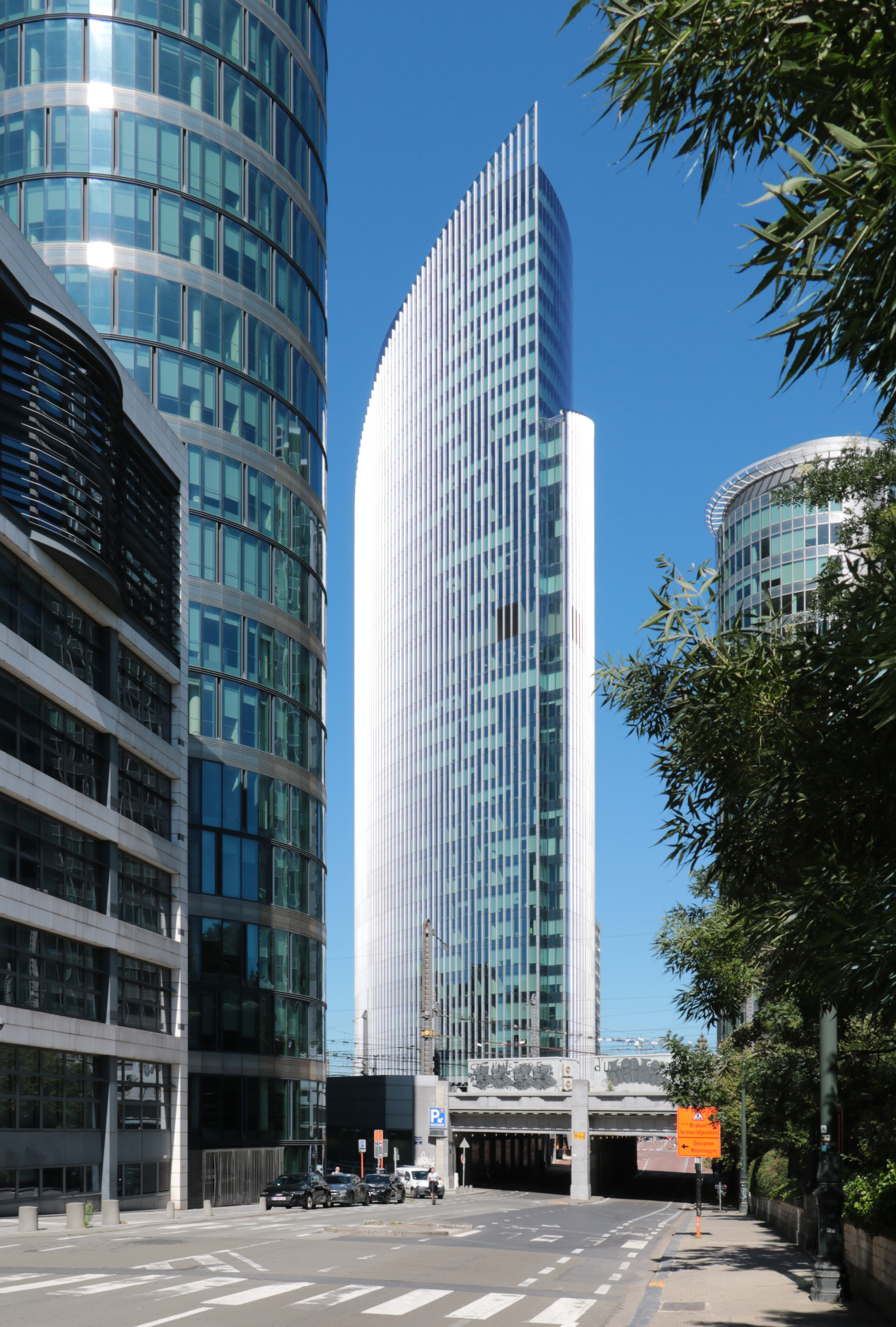
- The Iris Tower seen from the Rue Gineste/Ginestestraat
- Interactive map of the Iris Tower area

General information
- Status: Completed
- Type: Office
- Location: Place Saint-Lazare / Sint-Lazarusplein 2, 1210 Saint-Josse-ten-Noode, Brussels-Capital Region, Belgium
- Coordinates: 50.85716°N 4.36150°E
- Construction started: 2018
- Completed: 2020
- Owner: Ghelamco Group

Height
- Roof: 137 m (449 ft)

Technical details
- Structural system: Reinforced concrete
- Floor count: 32
- Floor area: 45,000 m^{2} (484,000 sq ft)

Design and construction
- Architects: Atelier de Genval (Pierre Accarain & Marc Bouillot)
- Developer: AG Real Estate & Ghelamco Group
- Structural engineer: Bureau d`etudes Greisch
- Main contractor: CIT Blaton

The Iris Tower, also known as the Silver Tower, is an office skyscraper in the Saint-Josse-ten-Noode municipality of Brussels, Belgium. Built between 2018 and 2020, the tower stands at 137 metres (449 ft) tall with 32 floors and is the fourth tallest building in Belgium. It serves as the headquarters of the Brussels Regional Public Service.

== History ==
=== Background ===
The tower is located near the North Station and the Botanical Garden. Construction began in late 2018, and the building has been occupied by the Brussels Regional Public Service since November 2020. In 2010, the construction developer AG Real Estate received a building permit for an office tower on the Place Saint-Lazare/Sint-Lazarusplein in Saint-Josse-ten-Noode, with a height of 137 metres (449 ft).

In November 2012, AG Real Estate decided to postpone the planned Silver Tower construction due to the vacancy of other office buildings and skyscrapers in the Northern Quarter. As a result, the planned redevelopment of the Place Saint-Lazare was also cancelled, as this redevelopment would be partially financed by the urban planning fees that the municipality of Saint-Josse-ten-Noode would receive for the tower's construction.

In July 2013, AG Real Estate announced that it would continue with the Silver Tower project that year. The Flemish government was tipped off as a potential tenant or buyer. Construction of the tower was scheduled for completion in 2016, but asbestos first had to be removed from a vacant building on the site. After the demolition of this building, the project stalled due to a lack of customers. The Flemish government, a potential tenant or buyer, opted for the Herman Teirlinck building on the Tour & Taxis site.

=== Construction ===
In September 2018, the Brussels government announced that the Silver Tower, which still had to be fully built except for the foundations, would house the Brussels Regional Public Service and the Tax Department. The Brussels Region announced that it would occupy the Silver Tower for at least 18 years and pay 146.50 euros per m^{2} annually. In addition to the Silver Tower, the project developer Ghelamco also acquired 64.5% of the shares in the Communication Centre North (CCN), which houses the North Station, among other things, from the Brussels Region.

Soon after the Brussels government announced its choice for Ghelamco and the Silver Tower, two competitors to the project, Befimmo and Fedimmo, filed an appeal with the Council of State. At the end of October, the Council of State ruled in their favor, as the Brussels Region had not followed the correct procedure. The lease agreement was consequently suspended. In addition, questions arose regarding the allocation of the project to Ghelamco, which was previously involved in the dossier concerning the Eurostadium that was not built . The Brussels Region launched a new procedure, but the construction companies that applied in the first phase withdrew from this procedure. As a result, Ghelamco was again designated to develop the Silver Tower project.

In September 2014, the municipality of Saint-Josse-ten-Noode applied for a planning permit for the redevelopment of the Place Saint-Lazare. The square was to be redeveloped in 2018, but work did not actually start until October 2019.

Since autumn 2020, the tower has housed the 2,000 civil servants of the Brussels-Capital Region. Its name was changed to Iris Tower in November 2020. The yellow iris is the region's emblem (referring to the presence of these flowers on the city's original site) and a stylised version is featured on its official flag.

== Description ==
The Silver Tower is an office tower with an above-ground area of 45,000 m^{2} (484,000 sq ft), seven underground levels, a ground floor with two mezzanines, and thirty-two additional above-ground floors. The building is elliptical, 28 metres (92 ft) wide and 69 metres (226 ft) long. Its height is 137 metres (449 ft). It is a project of the Ghelamco Group.

== Gallery ==
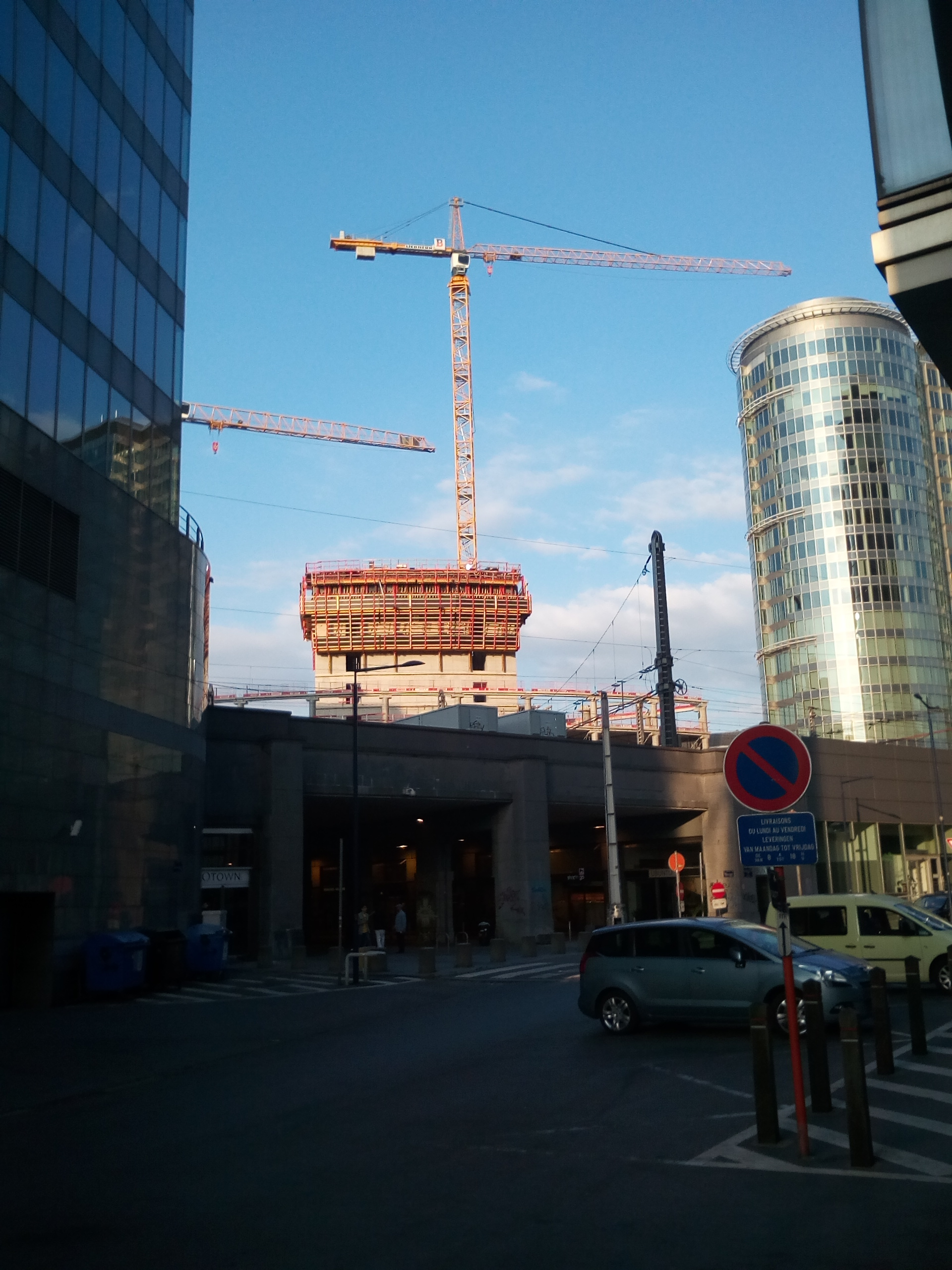
The Iris Tower under construction (July 2019)

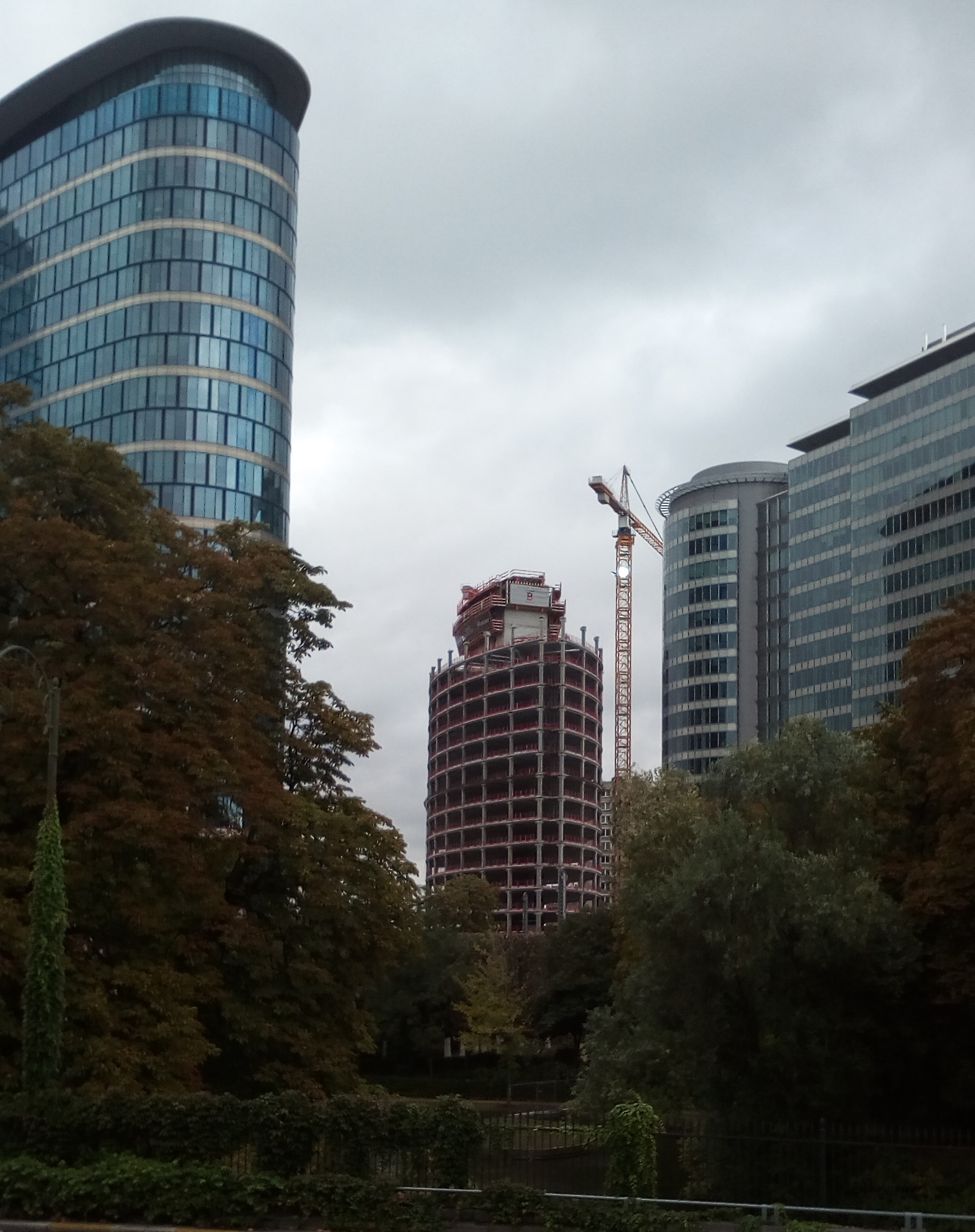
September 2019

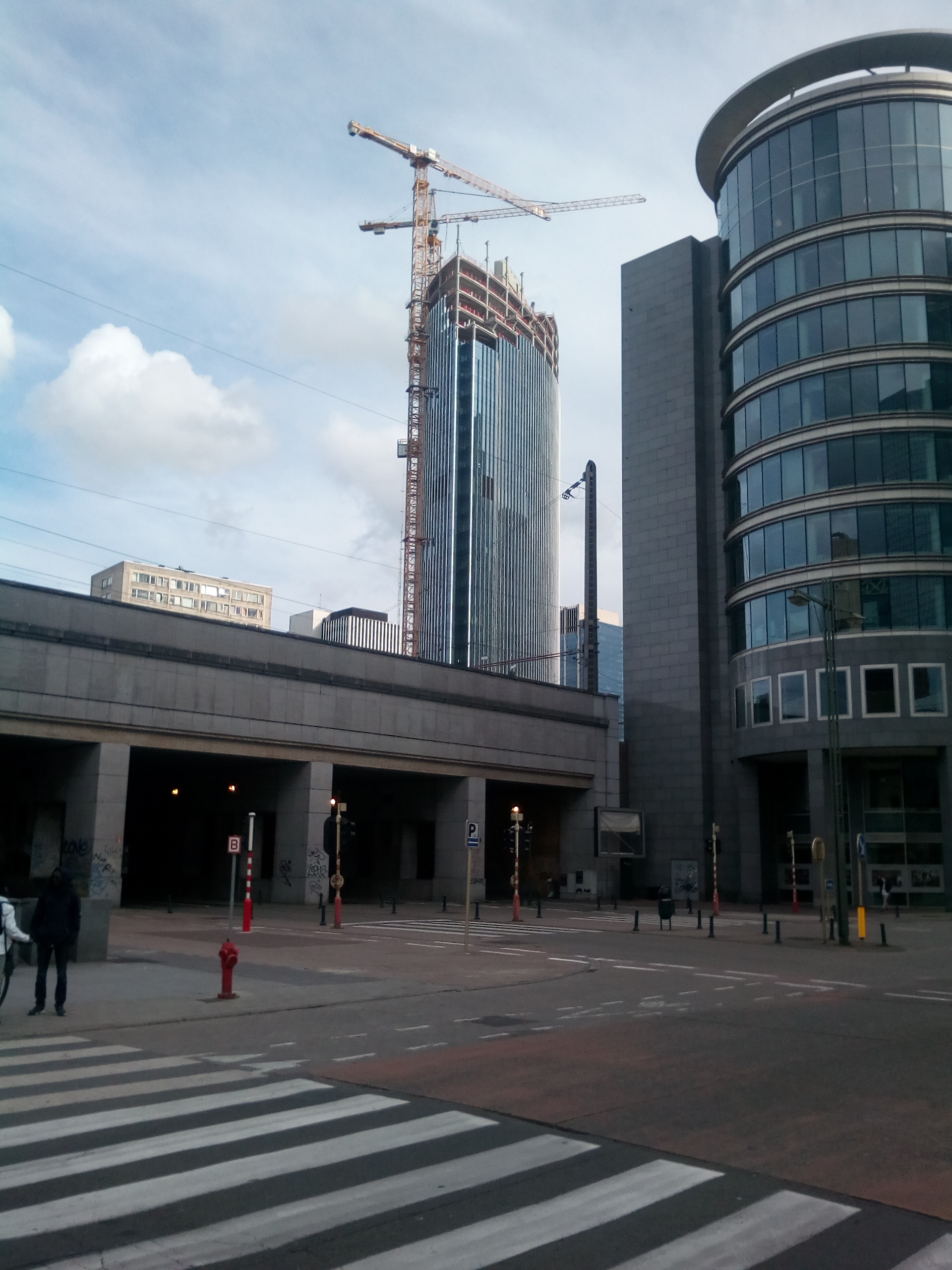
April 2020

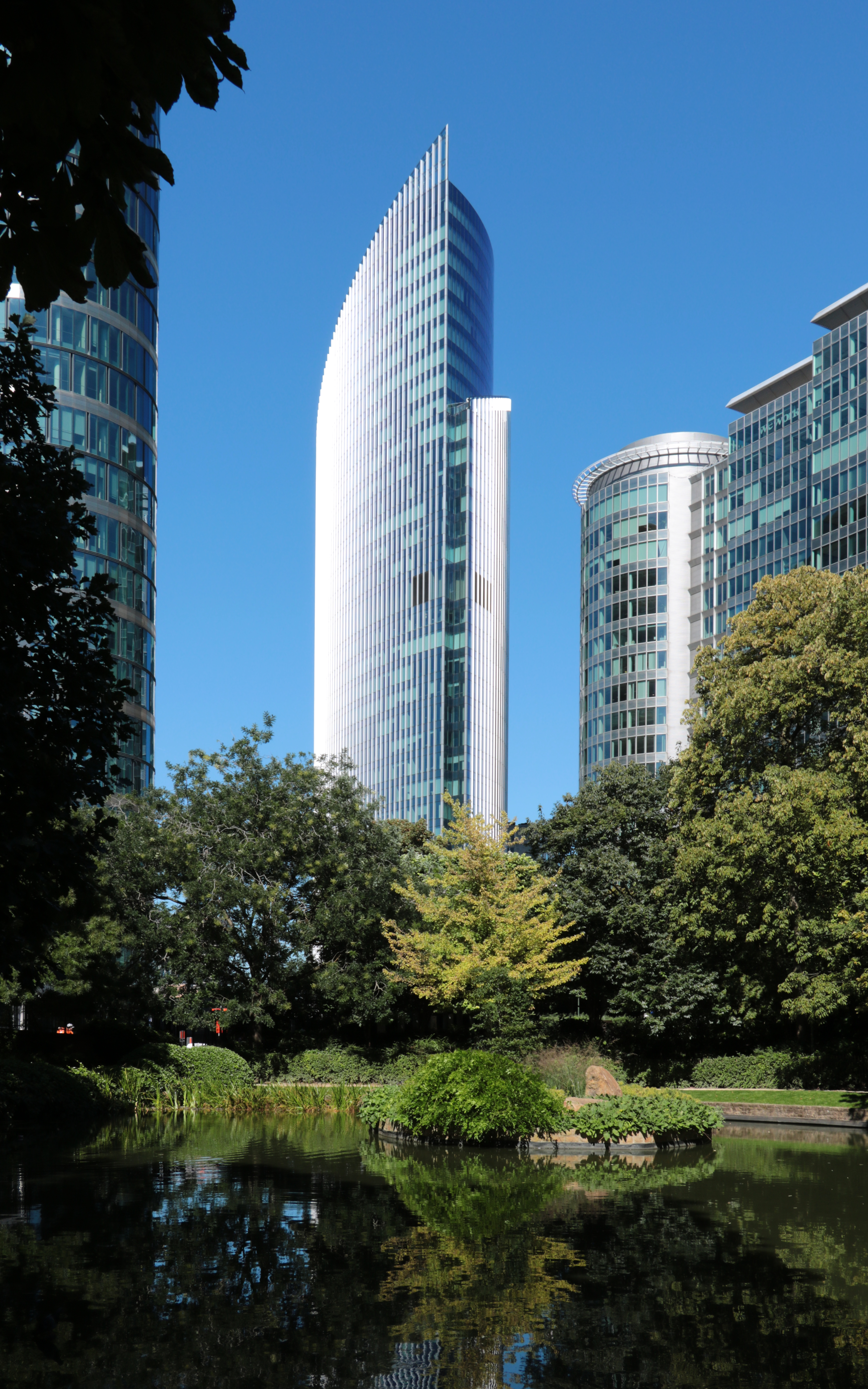
Seen from the Botanical Garden

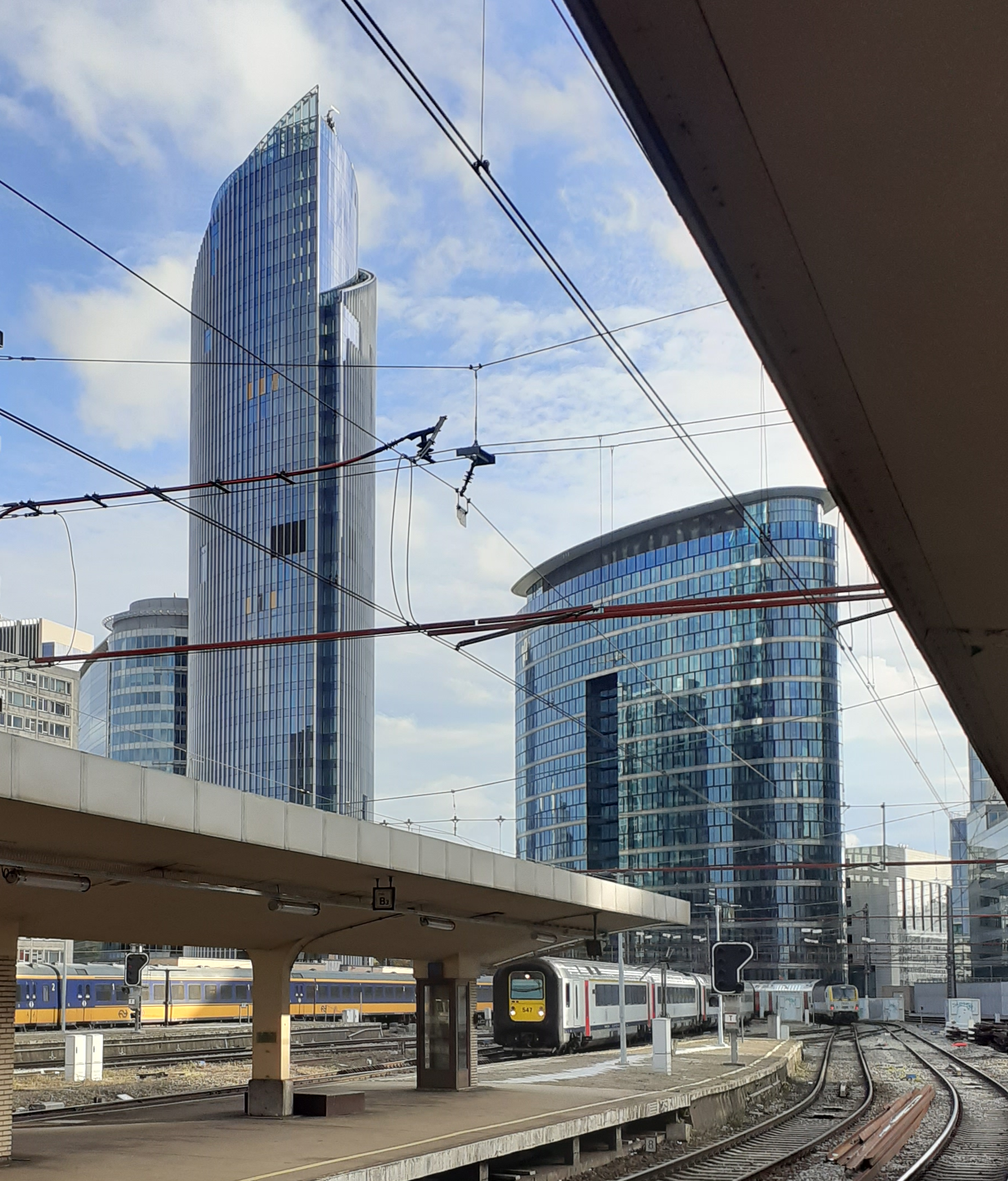
Seen from the North Station

== See also ==
- List of tallest structures in Belgium
- List of tallest buildings in the European Union
