= Brusilia =

Curved high-rise building in Brussels, Belgium

Coordinates: 50.86483°N 4.37937°E

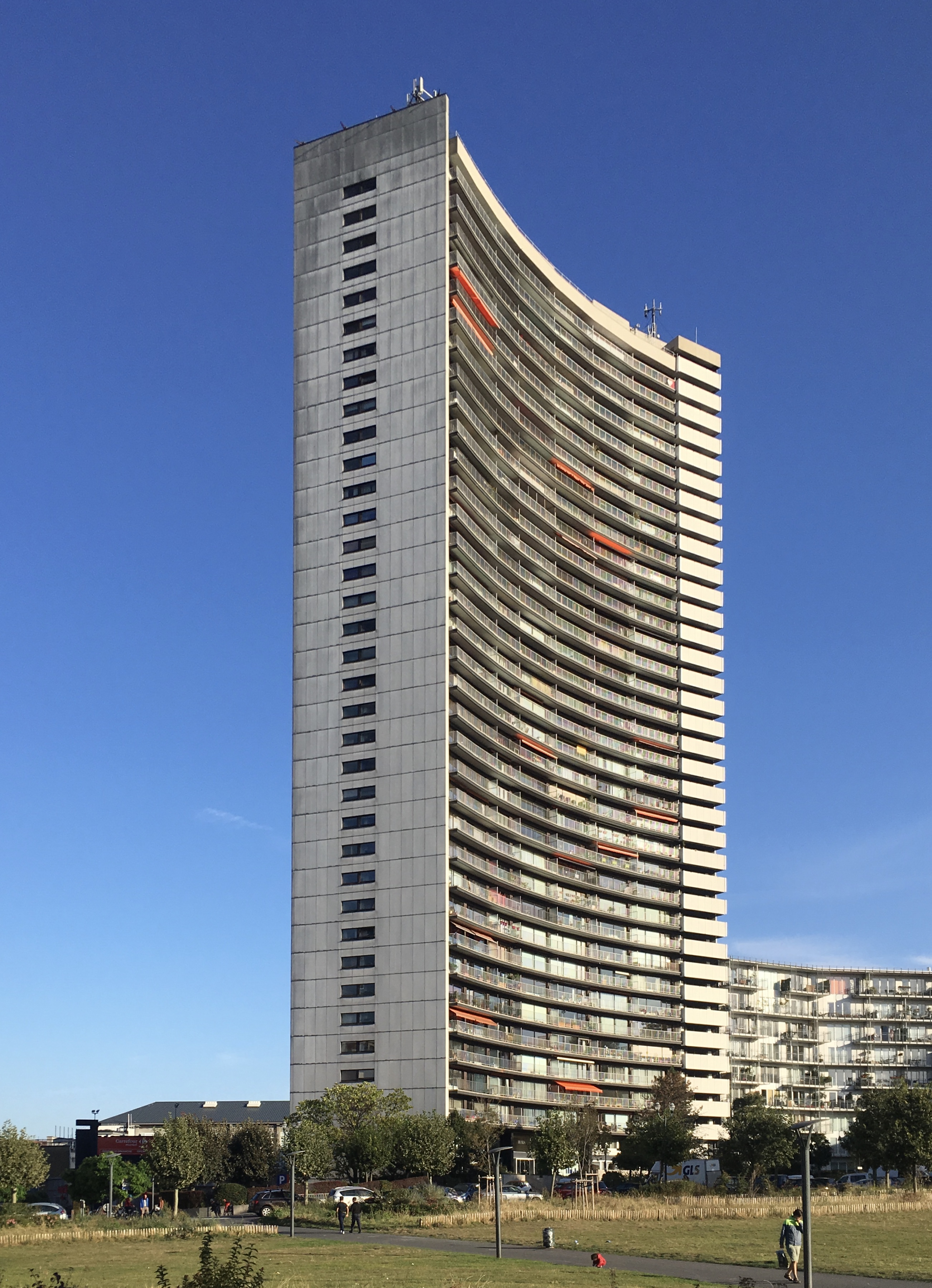
Résidence Brusilia

The Résidence Brusilia, or simply the Brusilia, is a curved high-rise in the Schaerbeek municipality of Brussels, Belgium, next to Josaphat Park. It was designed by the architect Jacques Cuisinier and built from 1970 to 1974. At 35 storeys and 100 metres (330 ft) tall, it remained the tallest all-residential building in Belgium until the completion of the 142-metre-tall (466 ft) UP-site tower in Brussels in 2014.

The upper floors offer a wide view over Brussels and beyond (as far north as Antwerp and Doel Nuclear Power Station on a clear day). Originally, the building was supposed to be double the width. The left half was built first, together with the foundations of the right half, but the right tower was postponed sine die because of the first oil crisis. In 2014, a lower building was completed in a different style on the right side foundations.
