= The One (Brussels) =

Skyscraper in Brussels, Belgium

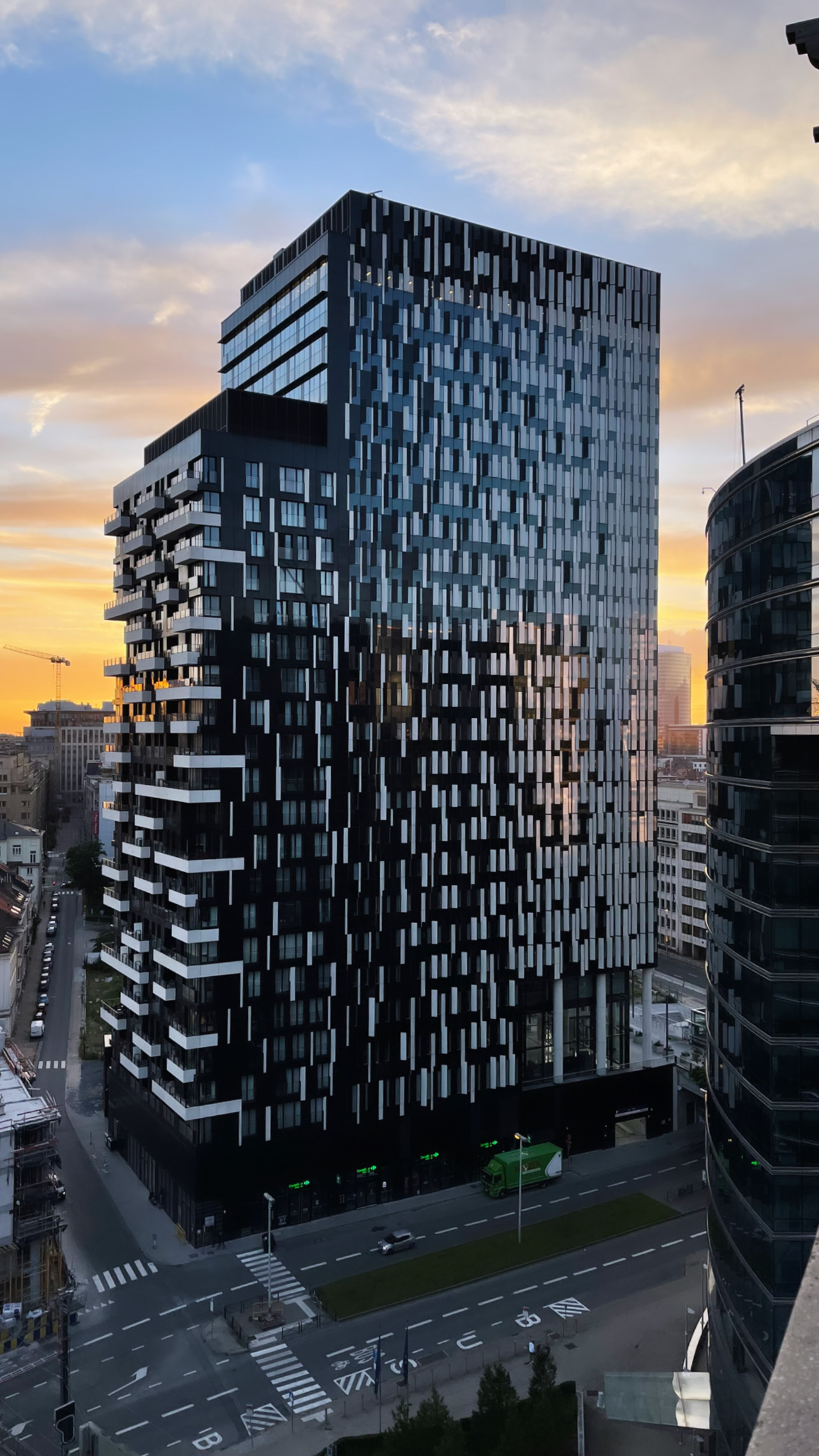
- The One seen from the Résidence Palace
- Interactive map of the The One area

General information
- Status: Completed
- Type: Mixed-use: Residential/Office
- Location: Rue de la Loi / Wetstraat 40–107, 1040 City of Brussels, Brussels-Capital Region, Belgium
- Coordinates: 50.84295°N 4.37761°E
- Construction started: 2015
- Completed: 2019
- Cost: €60,400,000
- Owner: Deka Immobilien

Height
- Roof: 105.2 m (345 ft)

Technical details
- Structural system: Reinforced concrete
- Floor count: 25 (+3 underground)
- Floor area: 47,218 m^{2} (508,000 sq ft)

Design and construction
- Architect: B2Ai
- Developer: Atenor
- Structural engineer: Boydens Engineering
- Main contractor: Valens SA (Eiffage) & Louis de Waele (Rabot Dutilleul)

The One is a mixed-use high-rise building in the Leopold Quarter of Brussels, Belgium. Built between 2015 and 2019, the tower stands at 105.2 metres (345 ft) tall with 25 floors and is the twelfth tallest building in Belgium.

== History ==
The building was managed by the developer Atenor. This project is the first concrete project of the new urban development plan aimed at transforming the area around the Rue de la Loi/Wetstraat. It replaces the former brutalist-style Europa Hotel (Crowne Plaza) opened in 1971 and demolished in 2015.

The building consists of offices, residences and retail spaces, each with its own independence. For example, access to the offices is via the Rue de la Loi, while the apartments have their entrance on the Rue Jacques de Lalaing/Jacques de Lalaingstraat and the shops on the Chaussée d'Etterbeek/Etterbeeksesteenweg. Circulation (corridors, elevators, etc.) and technical systems (ventilation, heating, etc.) within the tower are also independent for each section. Furthermore, the floor plans do not correspond between the different sections. The graphic style of the side facades is similar to that of One 57 in New York City.

These side facades, for the office section only, feature randomly distributed fixed shutters angled at 45° which allow daylight to enter while filtering sunlight. These elements contribute to the building's graphic animation, which, depending on the viewpoint, will change appearance and color.

The Crowne Plaza Europa hotel before the construction of The One

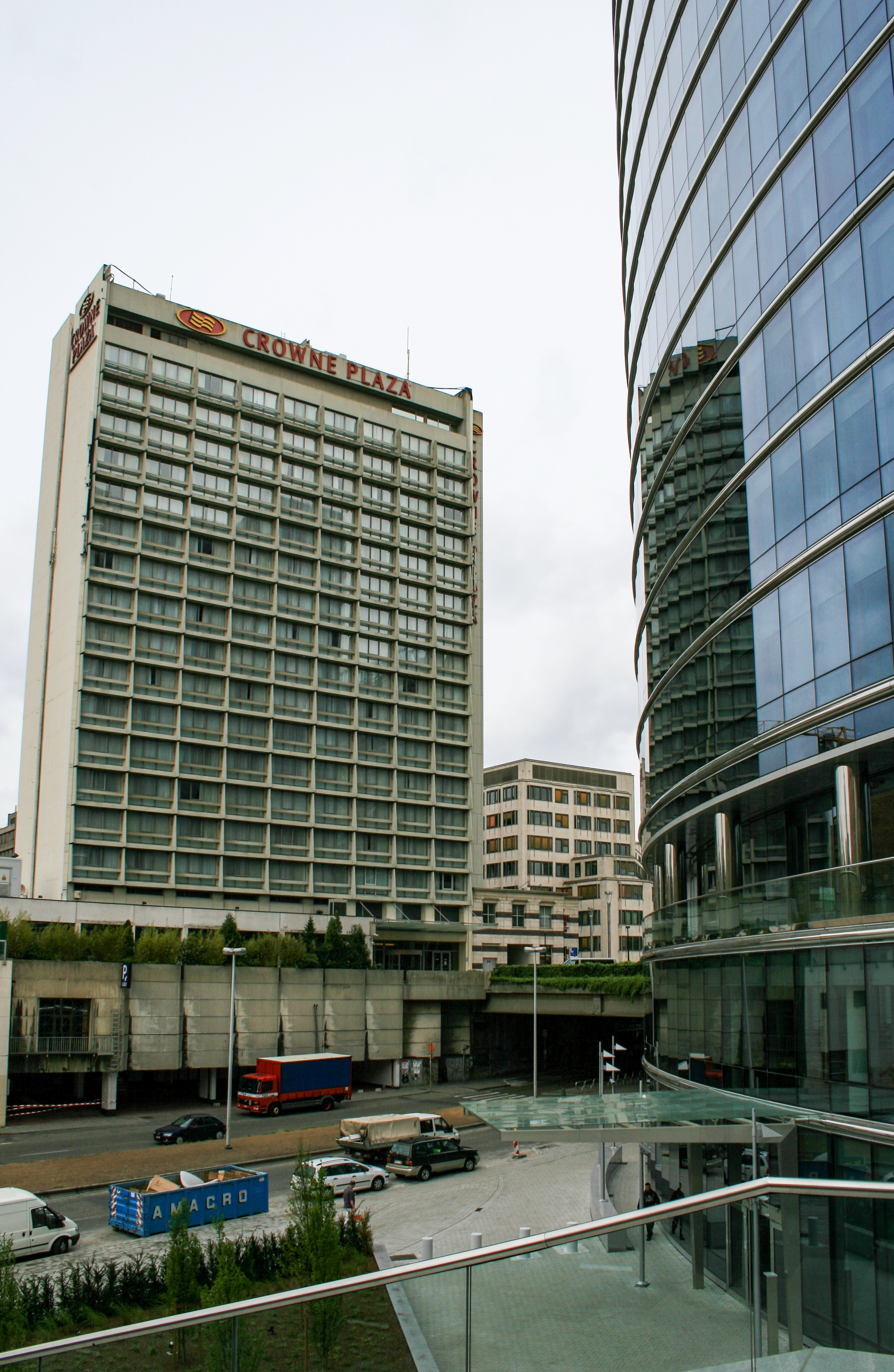

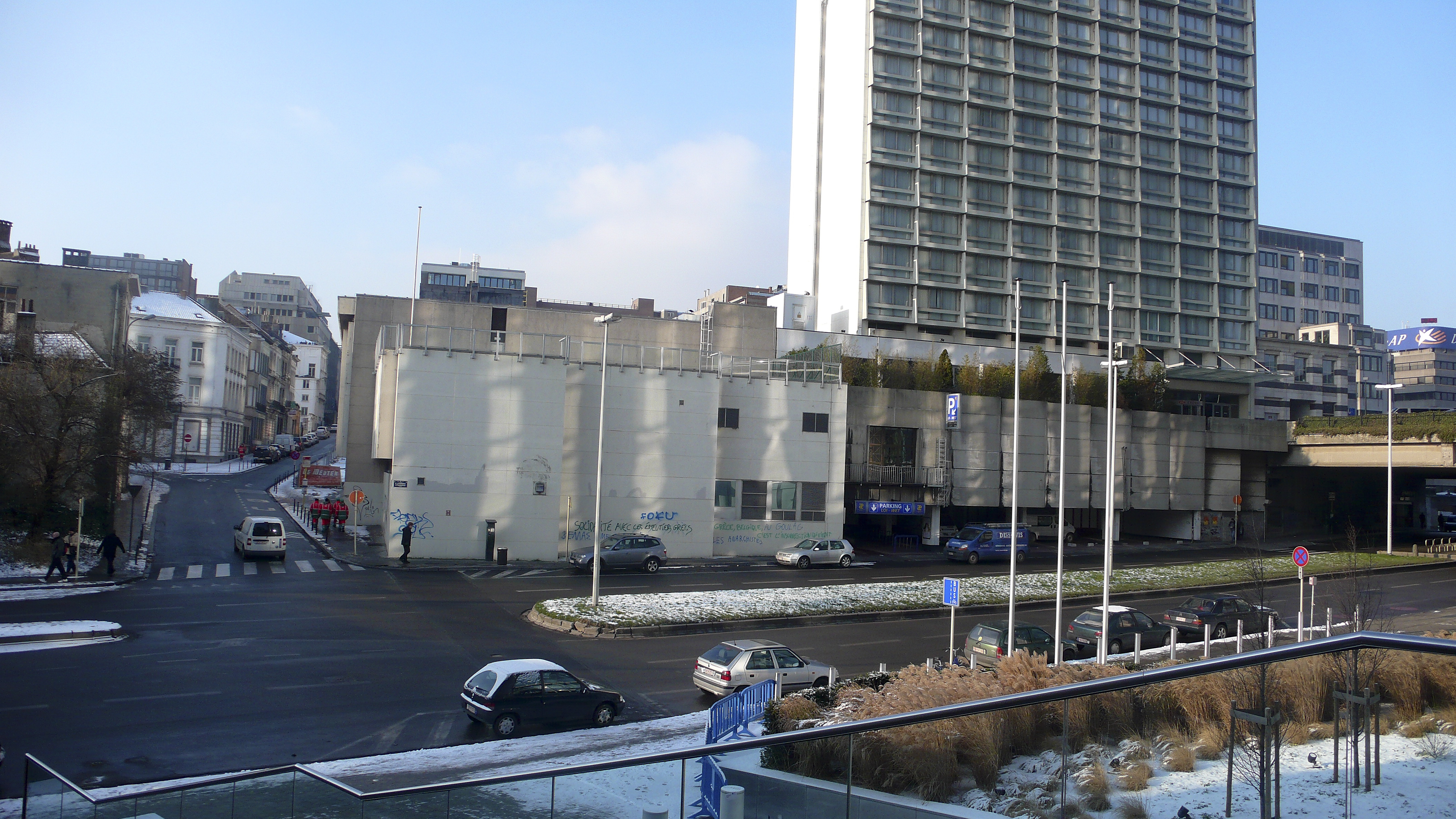

== See also ==
- List of tallest structures in Belgium
