= UP-site =

Skyscraper in Brussels, Belgium

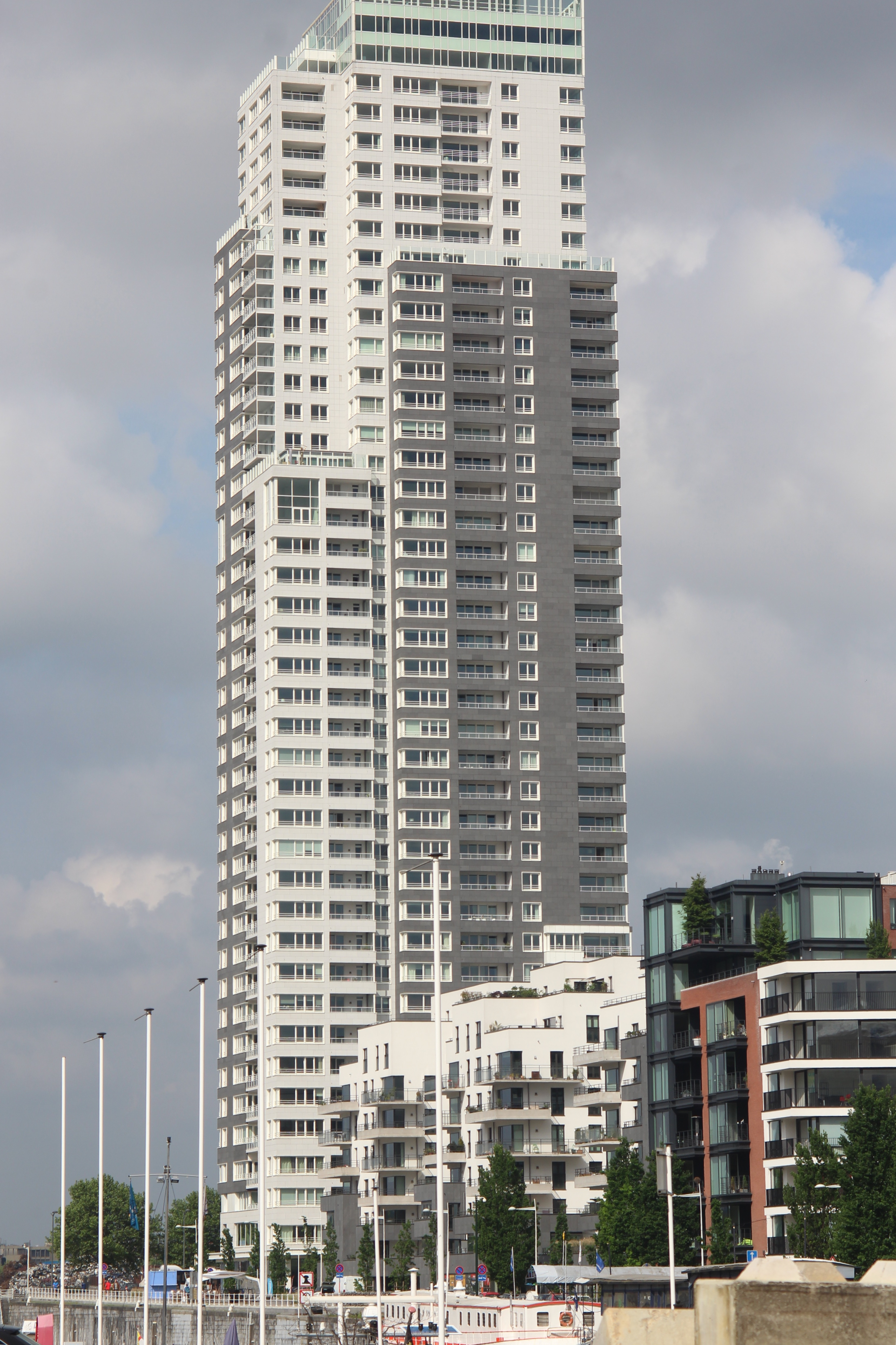
- Interactive map of the UP-site area

General information
- Status: Completed
- Type: Residential
- Location: Quai des Péniches / Akenkaai 69, 1000 City of Brussels, Brussels-Capital Region, Belgium
- Coordinates: 50.86418°N 4.35206°E
- Construction started: 2011
- Completed: 2014

Height
- Roof: 142 m (466 ft)

Technical details
- Structural system: Reinforced concrete
- Floor count: 42

Design and construction
- Architects: Lion Workshops Architects-Urban Planners; A2RC Architects
- Developer: Atenor Group

UP-site is a residential skyscraper in the Northern Quarter of Brussels, Belgium. Built between 2011 and 2014, the tower stands at 142 metres (466 ft) tall with 42 floors and is the third tallest building in Belgium.

== History ==
The building was developed by Atenor and opened in 2014. At 142 metres (466 ft) high, it is the tallest residential tower in the country and the third tallest tower in Brussels and Belgium. The tower is located in the northern part of the City of Brussels, along the Brussels Canal.

The building was designed as a reference point in the redeveloped area of the canal district. The building technologies provided the tower with materials that reduce energy consumption by up to 45%. The surfaces of each floor are flexible, offering sustainable mobility amidst the surrounding green areas, making the tower more attractive to the local market. Thick 8 cm (3.1 in) slabs were used for the roof floor to resist high winds.

The central structure was constructed using the ATR self-climbing system along with narrow platforms designated for internal shafts. This system incorporates vertical beam-based formwork, ensuring adaptability. The operational cycle facilitated by the self-climbing system was completed in seven days. Platforms with a maximum width of 12 metres (39 ft), in addition to narrow platforms and solutions for internal shafts, were implemented.

Aluminum panels served as the formwork for the slabs. The use of two sets of props enhanced efficiency by allowing for the recovery of the majority of the formwork prior to the completion of the concrete hardening process. The HWS Hydraulic Windshield System significantly improved worker safety at the slab edge by employing large hydraulically lifted screens that encompassed the entire perimeter of the building.

== Gallery ==
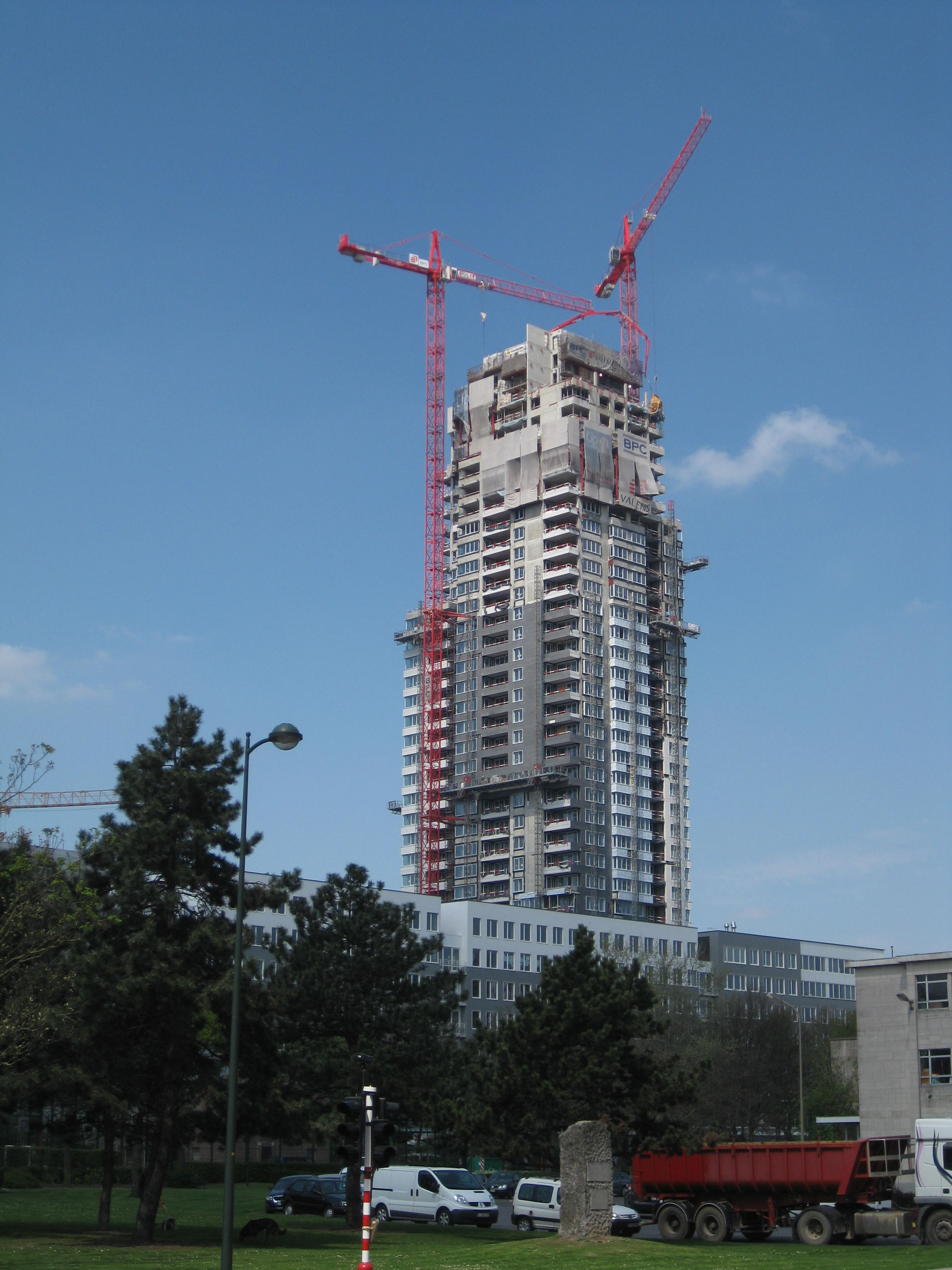
The tower under construction in April 2013

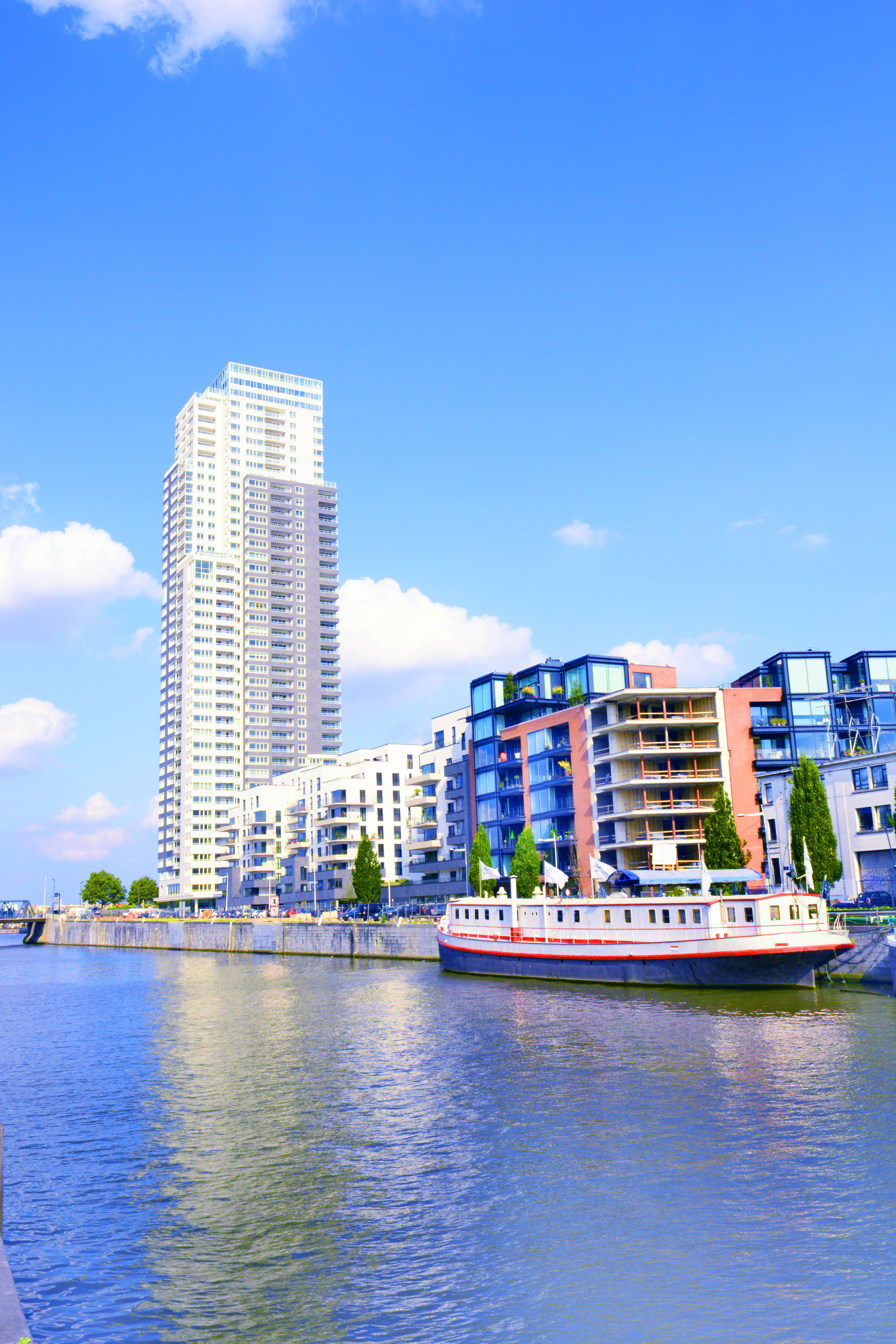
Seen from the canal

== See also ==
- List of tallest structures in Belgium
