= Federal Public Service Finance =

Belgian finance ministry

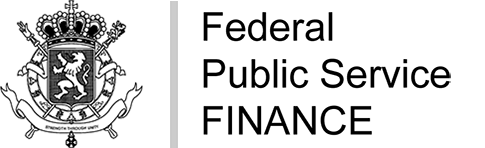
Logo

The FPS Finance (Dutch: FOD Financiën, French: SPF Finances, German: FÖD Finanzen), is a Federal Public Service of Belgium. It was created by Royal Order on 17 February 2002, as part of the plans of the Verhofstadt I Government to modernise the federal administration. It is responsible for the finances of the Federal Government and taxation.

== See also ==
- Minister of Finance (Belgium)
