= The Hotel Brussels =

Hotel in Brussels, Belgium

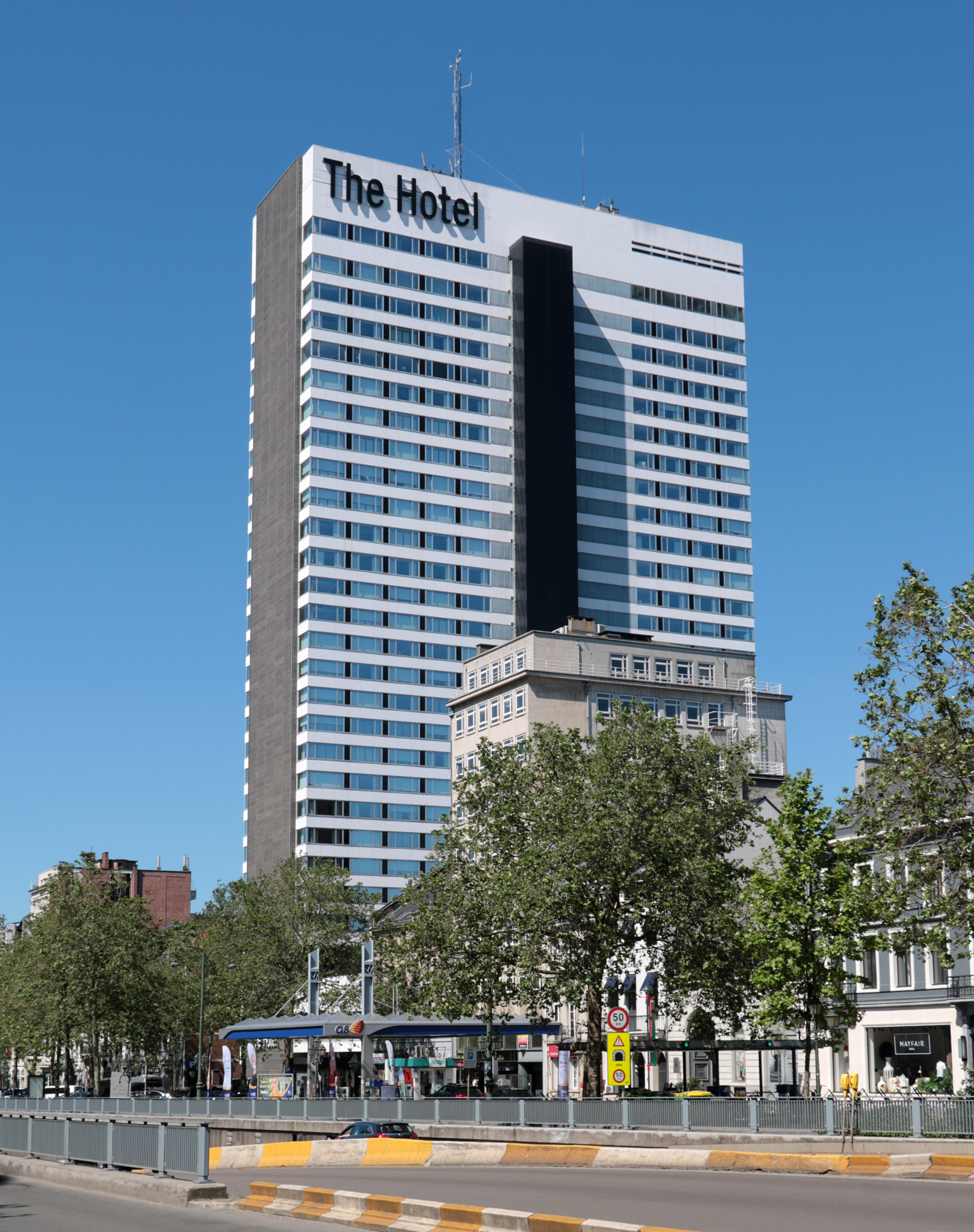
- The Hotel Brussels seen from the Boulevard de Waterloo/Waterloolaan
- Interactive map of the The Hotel Brussels area

General information
- Type: Hotel
- Architectural style: Modernism
- Location: Boulevard de Waterloo / Waterloolaan 38, 1000 City of Brussels, Brussels-Capital Region, Belgium
- Coordinates: 50°50′14″N 4°21′27″E
- Completed: 1969 (57 years ago)
- Opening: 2011 (15 years ago) as The Hotel Brussels
- Renovated: 2011
- Owner: Pandox AB
- Operator: Pandox AB

Technical details
- Floor count: 27

Design and construction
- Architect: Montois Partners Architects

Renovating team
- Architect: GCA Arquitectos Asociados

Other information
- Number of rooms: 423
- Number of suites: 18
- Number of restaurants: 1
- Parking: Yes
- Public transit: 2 6 Louise/Louiza and Porte de Namur/Naamsepoort

Website
- www.thehotel-brussels.be

The Hotel Brussels is a four-star hotel in the Louise/Louiza district of Brussels, Belgium, owned and managed by the Swedish investment group Pandox. A landmark building, it originally opened as the Brussels Hilton in 1969. Pandox purchased the building in September 2010, assumed management in February 2011 and commenced a complete renovation of the 27 floors. The renovations were completed after a two-year period.

The hotel is located at 38, boulevard de Waterloo/Waterloolaan, between the Place Louise/Louizaplein and the Namur Gate, and next to the Egmont Palace.

== History ==
The hotel was built in the 1960s on the Boulevard de Waterloo/Waterloolaan in Brussels, a shopping area running from the Place Louise/Louizaplein to the Namur Gate. It was one of the first international hotels to be built in the city. At that time, the buildings along the Boulevard de Waterloo were all in neo-Rococo, neoclassical or neo-Renaissance styles. The hotel building, however, caused a rupture with those styles being a massive tower containing 27 floors. The architect agency that designed the building was Montois Partners Architects, an agency located in Brussels.

The 94-metre-tall (308 ft) hotel is the highest public viewpoint in Brussels. The building is one of the most widely recognised high-rise buildings on Brussels' skyline. When city officials decided that for the long-term tall buildings should disappear in Brussels, they opted not to include the hotel on the list with buildings to be removed. This decision proves that the building has become a landmark, and a part of Brussels' city centre.

In March 2014, U.S. President Barack Obama and his entourage rented a total of 283 rooms of this and another hotel in Brussels (Crowne Plaza) during a single overnight visit to the city, with the president staying at The Hotel Brussels.

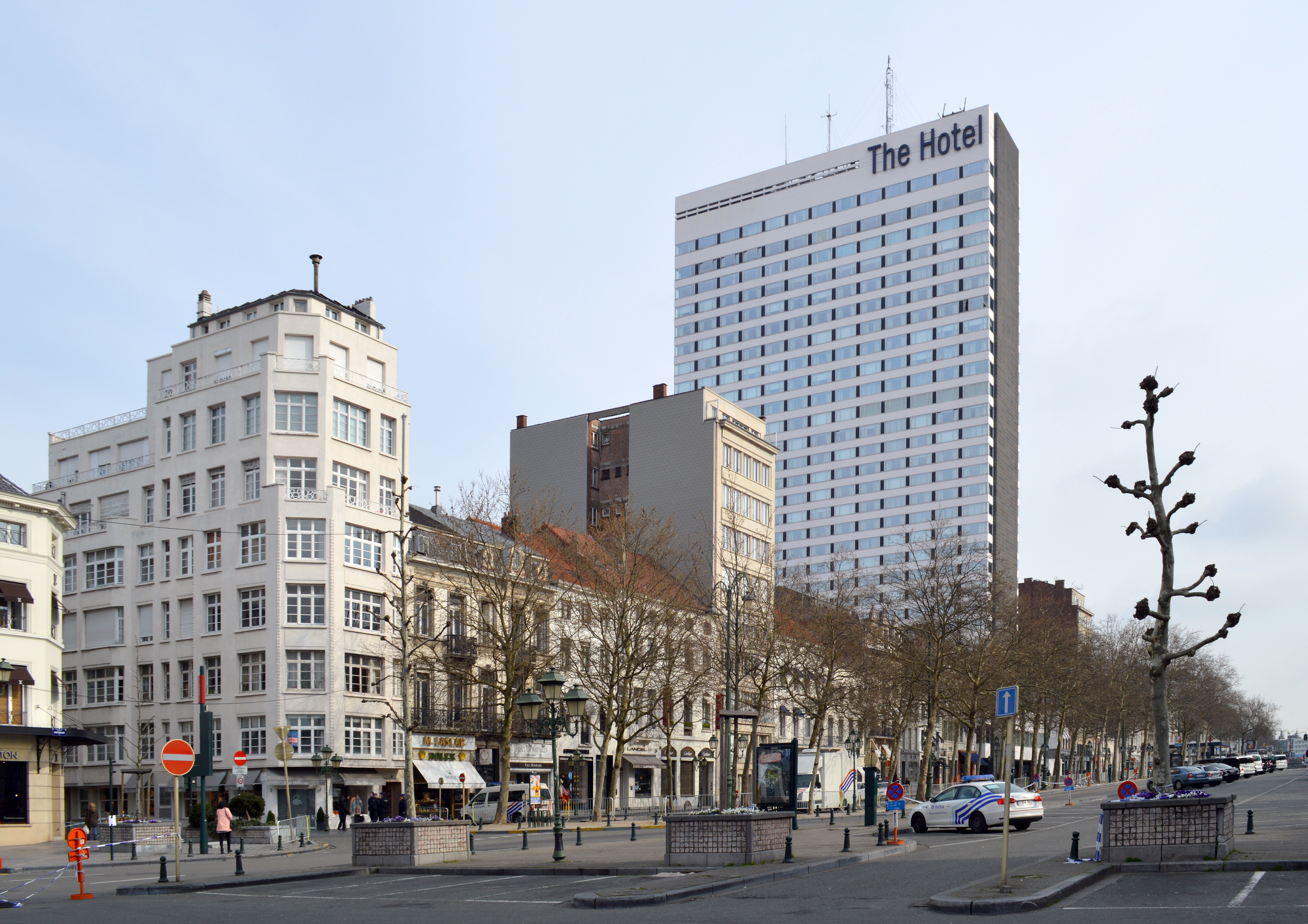
View of The Hotel Brussels from the Place Louise/Louizaplein

== See also ==
- Lists of hotels
- History of Brussels
- Architecture of Belgium
