= 1979 in Belgium =

- Decades: 1950s; 1960s; 1970s; 1980s; 1990s
- See also: Other events of 1979; List of years in Belgium

Events in the year 1979 in Belgium.

== Incumbents ==
- Monarch: Baudouin
- Prime Minister: Paul Vanden Boeynants (to 3 April); Wilfried Martens (from 3 April)

== Events ==
- 13 June – In Marckx v Belgium the European Court of Human Rights finds for the plaintiff, Paula Marckx, that Belgian inheritance law is unfair to unmarried mothers and their children.
- 25 June – Red Army Faction fail to assassinate Alexander Haig, Supreme Allied Commander of NATO, with a bomb in Casteau

== Art & architecture ==
Cinema

- Harpya, written and directed by Raoul Servais

== Publications ==
- Rita Lejeune and Jacques Stiennon (eds.), La Wallonie, le Pays et les Hommes: Lettres, Arts, Culture, vol. 2 (La Renaissance du Livre, Brussels)

== Births ==
- 5 January – Liesbet De Vocht, former road bicycle racer
- 3 February – Wouter Vrancken, footballer
- 24 February – Nabil Ben Yadir, film director,
- 19 March – Stan Van Samang, actor and singer
- 10 May – Marieke Vervoort, Paralympic athlete
- 31 May – Jean-François Gillet, footballer
- 21 July – Laurent Delorge, footballer
- 29 August – Stijn Devolder, road bicycle racer
- 8 September – Frederik Willems, cyclist
- 13 September – Geike Arnaert, singer
- 27 December – Ann Van Elsen, model

== Deaths ==
- 11 February – Marie Delcourt (born 1891), classicist
- 25 February – Marguerite Massart (born 1900), engineer
- 10 May – Louis Paul Boon (born 1912), novelist
