= 1964 in Belgium =

- Decades: 1940s; 1950s; 1960s; 1970s; 1980s
- See also: Other events of 1964; List of years in Belgium

Events in the year 1964 in Belgium.

== Incumbents ==
- Monarch: Baudouin
- Prime Minister: Théo Lefèvre

== Events ==
- 17 February – Government of Belgium and Government of Morocco sign a convention for the recruitment of guest workers.
- 11 May – Front Démocratique des Francophones political party founded.
- 11 October – Municipal elections
- 27 October – Hostage crisis begins in Stanleyville, Republic of the Congo.
- 24 November – Operation Dragon Rouge ends hostage crisis in Stanleyville.

== Art and architecture ==
- René Magritte, Le fils de l'homme

== Births ==
- 4 February – Steven Vanackere, politician
- 15 March – Marco Van Hees, politician
- 26 March – Godelieve Jansens, cyclist
- 17 April
  - Sonja Vermeylen, cyclist
  - Bart Van den Bossche, entertainer (died 2013)
- 4 May – Peter Roes, cyclist
- 12 May – Bart Somers, politician
- 18 May – Luc Suplis, judoka
- 9 June – Bart Moeyaert, writer
- 14 June – Pieter Timmermans, businessman
- 21 June – Claude Verspaille, footballer
- 3 July – Frederik Vansina, pilot
- 6 July – Thierry Warmoes, politician
- 26 July – Anne Provoost, writer
- 23 August - Johan Bruyneel, cyclist
- 2 October – Hilde Quintens, cyclist
- 31 October – Dimitri Mbuyu, footballer
- 8 November – Dominique Leroy, businesswoman

== Deaths ==
- 7 January – Jean Verbrugge (born 1896), orthopedic surgeon
- 26 February – Léon Vanderstuyft (born 1890), cyclist
- 29 February – Victor van Straelen (born 1889), conservationist
- 27 March – Roger Motz (born 1904), politician
- 21 June – Jan Mertens (born 1904), cyclist
- 27 June – Georges Brausch (born 1915), ethnographer
- 13 July – Achille Delattre (born 1879), trade unionist
- 30 July – Alfred Verdyck (born 1882), footballer
- 2 September – Henri Hanlet (born 1888), cyclist
- 17 September – Jean Ray (born 1887), writer
- 28 September – Henri Grégoire (born 1881), scholar
- 5 October – Jean-Baptiste Janssens (born 1889), Jesuit
- 16 November – Lucien Dehoux (born 1890), gymnast
- 7 December – Aloïs Simon (born 1897), historian
