= 1976 in Belgium =

- Decades: 1950s; 1960s; 1970s; 1980s; 1990s
- See also: Other events of 1976; List of years in Belgium

Events in the year 1976 in Belgium.

== Incumbents ==
- Monarch: Baudouin
- Prime Minister: Leo Tindemans

== Events ==
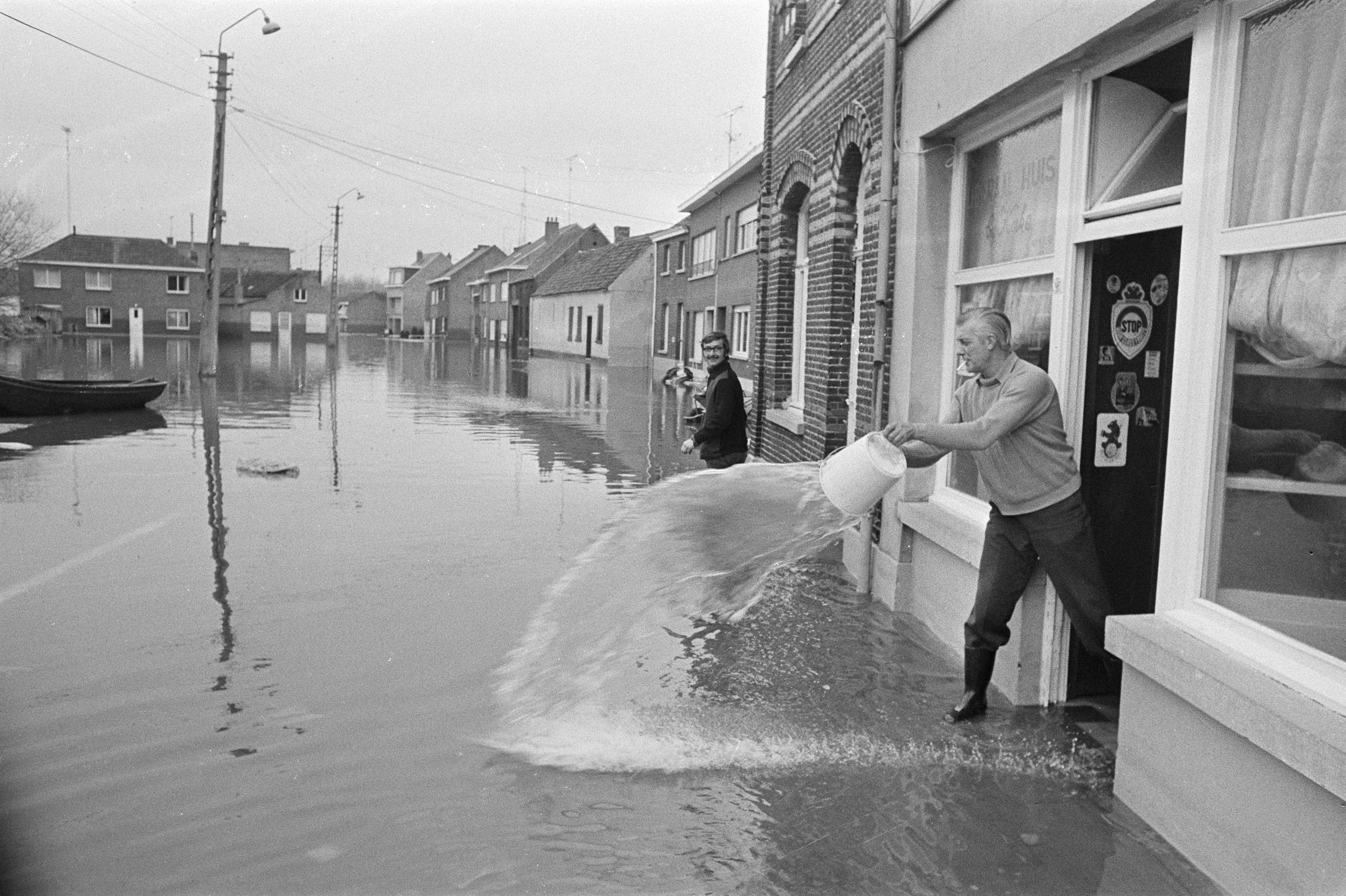
Flooding in Ruisbroek, January 1976

- 3 January – Flooding in Ruisbroek.
- April – World Environment and Resources Council conference in Brussels.
- 16 May – Niki Lauda wins the 1976 Belgian Grand Prix at Circuit Zolder
- 22 June to 8 July – Longest heatwave recorded in Belgium, with 16 days of temperatures over 30°C.
- 8 July – European People's Party founded in Brussels
- 20 September – Brussels Metro opens.
- 10 October – Municipal elections confirm the fusion of the Belgian municipalities, reducing the number of local governments from 2,359 to 589.

== Publications ==
- OECD, Economic Surveys: Belgium–Luxembourg.
- Jonathan E. Helmreich, Belgium and Europe: A Study in Small Power Diplomacy (The Hague, Mouton)

== Art and architecture ==
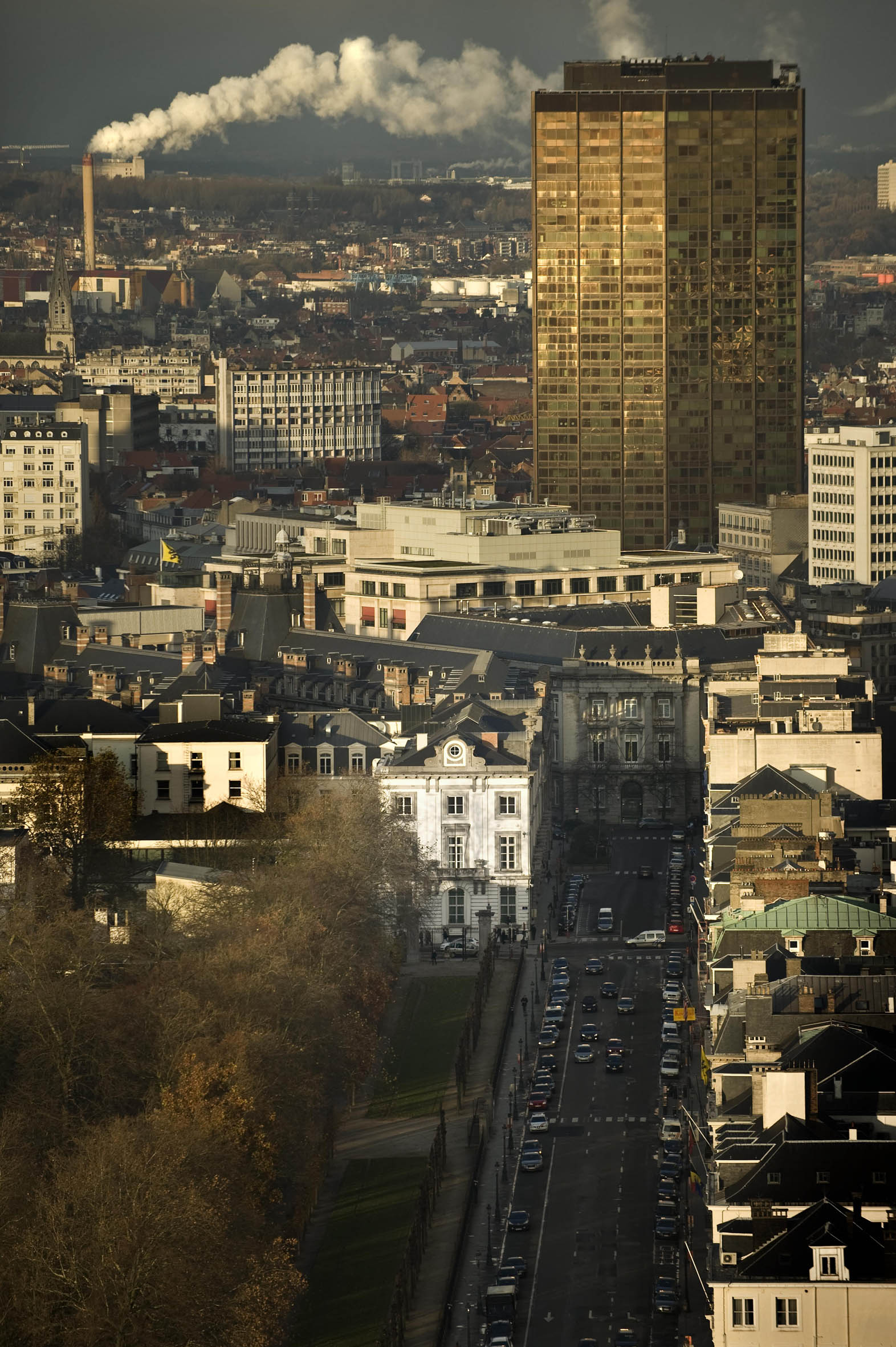
Astro Tower, Brussels

Buildings

- Astro Tower, Brussels, completed.

== Births ==
- 18 January – Laurence Courtois, tennis player
- 29 January – Belle Perez, singer
- 27 February – Ludovic Capelle, cyclist
- 3 March – Joos Valgaeren, footballer
- 4 March – Regi Penxten, DJ
- 11 June – Gaëtan Englebert, footballer
- 17 June – Sven Nys, cyclist
- 10 July – Wilfried Cretskens, cyclist
- 12 July – Dave Bruylandts, cyclist
- 26 August – Freya Piryns, politician
- 19 November – Benny Vansteelant, athlete (died 2007)
- 16 November – Mario Barravecchia, singer
- 4 December – Mbo Mpenza, footballer
- 7 December – Joris Vandenbroucke, politician
- 11 December – Timmy Simons, footballer

== Deaths ==
- 6 January – Henry George (born 1891), cyclist
- 28 January – Marcel Broodthaers (born 1924), artist
- 17 February – Jean Servais (born 1910), actor
- 16 March – Albert Lilar (born 1900), politician
- 13 April – Gustave Danneels (born 1913), cyclist
- 10 August – Fernand Dehousse (born 1906), politician
- 29 December – Ivo Van Damme (born 1954), athlete
