= 1981 in Belgium =

- Decades: 1960s; 1970s; 1980s; 1990s; 2000s
- See also: Other events of 1981; List of years in Belgium

Events in the year 1981 in Belgium.

== Incumbents ==
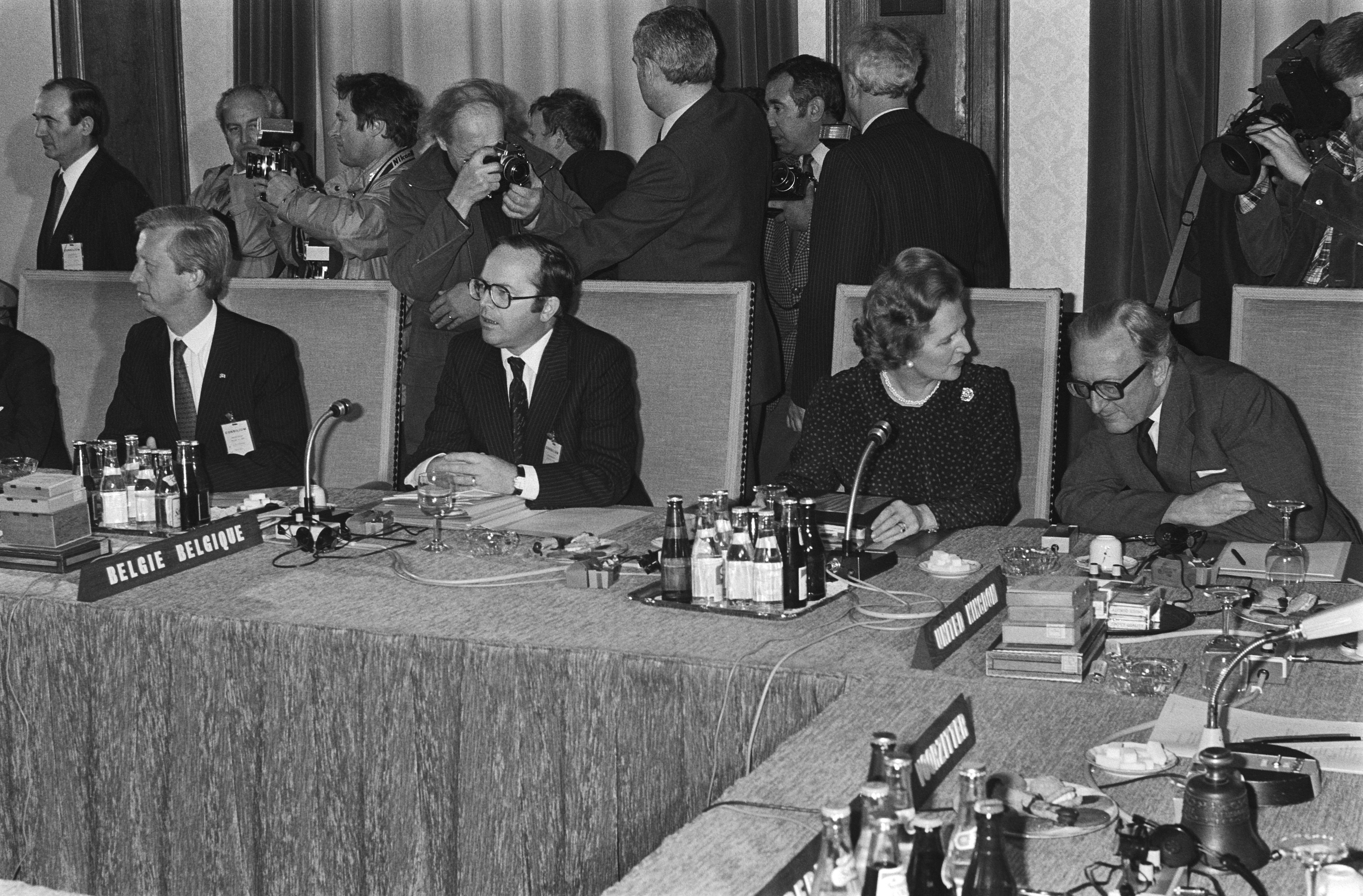
Wilfried Martens at a meeting of the European Council in Maastricht, 23 March 1981

- Monarch: Baudouin
- Prime Minister:
  - until 31 March: Wilfried Martens
  - 31 March-17 December: Mark Eyskens
  - starting 17 December: Wilfried Martens

== Events ==
- July 30 - Belgian Anti-Racism Law
- October 20 - 1981 Antwerp bombing
- November 8 - General election

== Publications ==
- Cowboy Henk strip first published
- OECD, Economic Surveys: Belgium, Luxembourg
- Rita Lejeune and Jacques Stiennon (eds.), La Wallonie, le Pays et les Hommes: Lettres, Arts, Culture, vol. 4 (La Renaissance du Livre, Brussels)

== Births ==
January

- 4 January – Silvy De Bie, singer
- 6 January – Jérémie Renier, actor

February

- 4 February – Johan Vansummeren, cyclist
- 27 February
  - Evi Goffin, singer
  - Élodie Ouédraogo, sprinter

April

- 10 April – Yves V, DJ and producer

May

- 3 May – Lieven Scheire, comedian

June

- 2 June – Kurt Hovelijnck, cyclist

July

- 15 July – Sébastien Rosseler, cyclist

October

- 3 October – Lydia Klinkenberg, politician

== Deaths ==
- January 27 - Leo Collard (born 1902), politician
- February 7 - Marius Mondelé, footballer
- February 9 - Albert Dejonghe (born 1894), cyclist
- April 5 - Émile Hanse (born 1892), footballer
- May 19 - Marcel Vercammen, footballer
- August 29 - Joseph Givard, footballer
- October 21 - Wilfried Puis (born 1943), footballer
- November 29 - Dieudonné Smets, cyclist
