= 1978 in Belgium =

- Decades: 1950s; 1960s; 1970s; 1980s; 1990s
- See also: Other events of 1978; List of years in Belgium

Events in the year 1978 in Belgium.

== Incumbents ==
- Monarch: Baudouin
- Prime Minister: Leo Tindemans (to 20 October); Paul Vanden Boeynants (from 20 October)

== Events ==
- 11 October – Leo Tindemans proffers his resignation as Prime Minister after the failure of the Egmont pact

== Publications ==
- Rita Lejeune and Jacques Stiennon (eds.), La Wallonie, le Pays et les Hommes: Lettres, Arts, Culture, vol. 1 (La Renaissance du Livre, Brussels

== Births ==
- 16 February – Tia Hellebaut, track and field athlete
- 4 July – Émile Mpenza, footballer
- 5 August – Kim Gevaert, sprinter
- 9 August – Wesley Sonck, footballer
- 15 December – Christophe Rochus, tennis player
- 18 December – Xandee, Flemish singer

== Deaths ==
- 9 August – Johan Daisne (born 1912), Flemish author
- 9 October – Jacques Brel (born 1929), singer
- 24 December – Raymond Braine (born 1907), footballer
