= 1980 in Belgium =

- Decades: 1960s; 1970s; 1980s; 1990s; 2000s
- See also: Other events of 1980; List of years in Belgium

Events from the year 1980 in Belgium

== Incumbents ==
- Monarch: Baudouin
- Prime Minister: Wilfried Martens

== Events ==
- 23 January – Christian Democrat, Socialist, VU and FDF governing coalition replaced by Christian Democrat–Socialist coalition
- 18 May – Christian Democrat–Socialist governing coalition replaced by Christian Democrat–Socialist–Liberal coalition
- 7 August – Regional devolution passes the Senate
- 22 October – Christian Democrat–Socialist–Liberal governing coalition replaced by Christian Democrat–Socialist coalition

== Publications ==
- Hadewijch, The Complete Works, translated by Columba Hart (New York, Paulist Press)
- Ronald Eckford Mill Irving, The Flemings and Walloons of Belgium (London, Minority Rights Group)
- Rita Lejeune and Jacques Stiennon (eds.), La Wallonie, le Pays et les Hommes: Lettres, Arts, Culture, vol. 3 (La Renaissance du Livre, Brussels)

== Births ==
- 6 January – Steed Malbranque, footballer
- 11 September – Greet Daems, politician

== Deaths ==
- 14 August – Edgard Darimont (born 1909), poster artist
- 3 October – Albéric O'Kelly de Galway (born 1911), chess grandmaster
