= 1970 in Belgium =

- Decades: 1950s; 1960s; 1970s; 1980s; 1990s
- See also: Other events of 1970; List of years in Belgium

Events in the year 1970 in Belgium.

== Incumbents ==
- Monarch: Baudouin
- Prime Minister: Gaston Eyskens

== Events ==
- 16 August – Jacky Ickx wins 1970 Austrian Grand Prix at the Österreichring
- 17 September – Ons Erfdeel established as a non-profit organisation to promote cultural understanding of and between Dutch-speaking peoples
- 20 September – Jacky Ickx wins 1970 Canadian Grand Prix at Circuit Mont-Tremblant
- 11 October – Municipal elections
- 24 December – Constitutional amendment to reflect the legal status of communities, regions and language areas of Belgium.

== Publications ==
- Luc André and Paul van Morckhoven, Contemporary Belgian Theatre (Brussels, Belgian Information and Documentation Institute)
- Jan Dhondt, The Industrial Revolution in Belgium and Holland, 1700–1914 (London, Collins)
- OECD, OECD Economic Surveys: B.L.E.U. 1970.

== Art and architecture ==
Buildings

- Work beings on Jacques Cuisinier's Brusilia building (completed 1974)

== Births ==
- 17 January – Tom Hautekiet, graphic designer (died 2020)
- 10 March – Benoît Lutgen, politician
