= 1968 in Belgium =

- Decades: 1940s; 1950s; 1960s; 1970s; 1980s
- See also: Other events of 1968; List of years in Belgium

Events in the year 1968 in Belgium.

== Incumbents ==
- Monarch: Baudouin
- Prime Minister: Paul Vanden Boeynants (to 17 July); Gaston Eyskens (from 17 July)

== Events ==
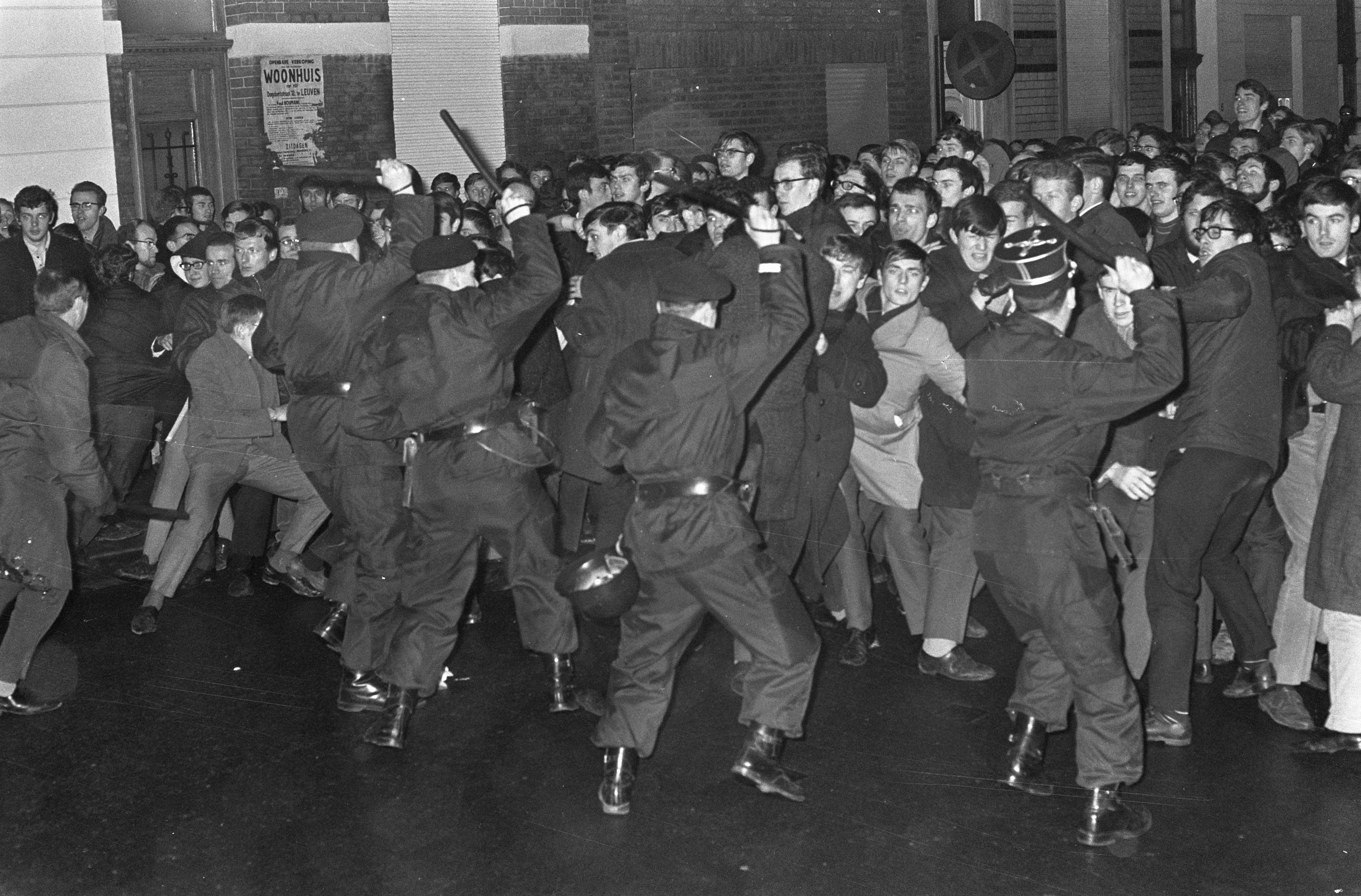
Police forcing student demonstrators in Leuven to disperse (18 January 1968)

- 18 January – Flemish students demonstrate against the French-speaking presence in Leuven
- 7 March – Rassemblement wallon founded
- 31 March – 1968 Belgian general election
- April – Ronquières inclined plane taken into use
- 24 June – Split of the Catholic University of Leuven announced
- 7 July – Jacky Ickx wins the 1968 French Grand Prix at Rouen-Les-Essarts

== Publications ==
- Georges Simenon, Maigret hésite

== Art and architecture ==
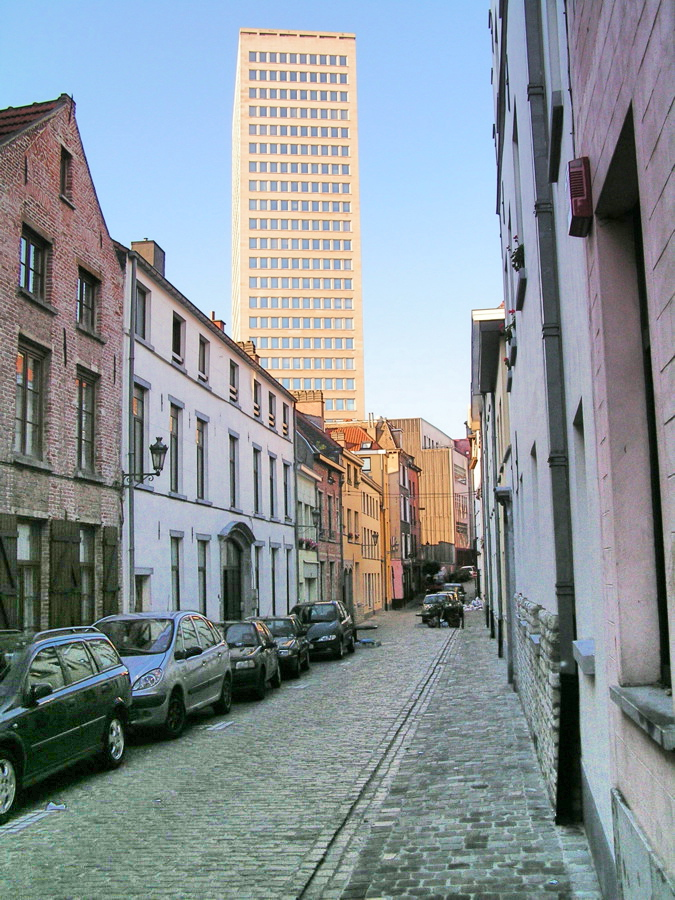
Sablon Tower, Brussels

Buildings

- Sablon Tower completed on the former site of the Maison du Peuple, Brussels

Cinema

- Sirene, written and directed by Raoul Servais

== Births ==
- 17 August – Bruno van Pottelsberghe, economist
- – Peter Goes, children's author and illustrator
- 21 November – Jan Bertels, politician

== Deaths ==
- 4 January – Joseph Pholien (born 1884), prime minister
- 25 February – Camille Huysmans (born 1871), prime minister
- 18 July – Corneille Heymans (born 1892), physiologist, Nobel laureate
- 4 December – Louise van den Plas (born 1877), feminist
