= 1971 in Belgium =

- Decades: 1950s; 1960s; 1970s; 1980s; 1990s
- See also: Other events of 1971; List of years in Belgium

Events in the year 1971 in Belgium.

== Incumbents ==
- Monarch: Baudouin
- Prime Minister: Gaston Eyskens

== Events ==
- 29 September to 1 October – Emperor Hirohito's state visit to Belgium.
- 7 November – 1971 Belgian general election
- 21 November – Brussels Agglomeration Council election

== Publications ==
- Paul-Henri Spaak, The Continuing Battle: Memoirs of a European, 1936–1966, translated by Henry Fox (Boston, Little, Brown)

== Births ==
- 5 March – Wim Decleir, athlete
- 20 June – Annik Van den Bosch, politician
- 25 October – Annemie Bogaerts, chemist
- 15 December – Arne Quinze, conceptual artist

== Deaths ==
- 24 February – Albert De Vleeschauwer (born 1897), politician
- 28 June – Camille Clifford (born 1885), actress
