= 1966 in Belgium =

- Decades: 1940s; 1950s; 1960s; 1970s; 1980s
- See also: Other events of 1966; List of years in Belgium

Events in the year 1966 in Belgium.

== Incumbents ==
- Monarch: Baudouin
- Prime Minister: Pierre Harmel (until 19 March), Paul Vanden Boeynants (from 19 March)

== Events ==
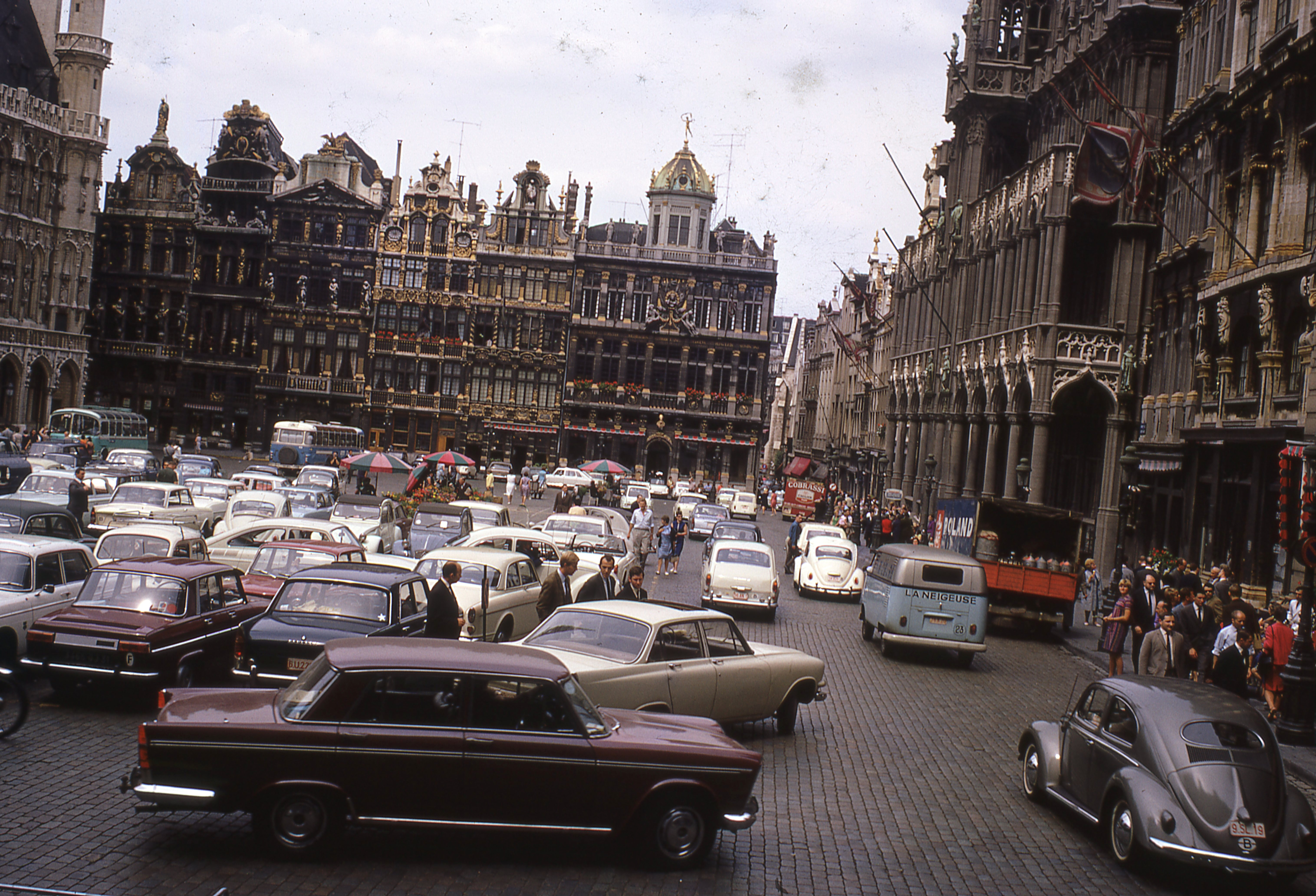
Cars parked on the Grand-Place in Brussels

- 31 January – Clashes between gendarmes and demonstrators from the closing Zwartberg mine leave two colliers dead.
- 10 February – Belgium ratifies London Fisheries Convention.
- 11 February – Pierre Harmel proffers his resignation as prime minister due to internal policy divisions in his Christian Democrat–Socialist coalition.
- 15 February to 9 May – Women at FN Herstal strike for equal pay.
- 15 March – London Fisheries Convention regulating fisheries in the North Sea comes into force.
- 19 March – Paul Vanden Boeynants takes office at the head of a Christian Democrat–Liberal coalition.
- 11 May – Real Madrid defeat FK Partizan in the 1966 European Cup Final at the Heysel Stadium.
- 13 May
  - Belgian bishops issue a declaration rejecting calls to remove the French-language section of the Catholic University of Leuven from the city of Leuven.
  - Elizabeth II visits Langemark to pay her respects at the Saint Julien Memorial to Canadian soldiers of the First World War.
- 2 June – Demonstration in Brussels in support of equal pay for equal work.

== Publications ==
- OECD, Economic Surveys: Belgium–Luxembourg Economic Union.

== Art ==
- René Magritte La Décalcomanie

== Births ==
- 26 January – Conny Aerts, astrophysicist
- 25 April – Eliane Tillieux, politician
- 3 July – Isabelle Emmery, politician
- 9 July – Amélie Nothomb, novelist
- 15 July – Elisa Brune, writer and journalist (died 2018)
- 6 September – Joachim Coens, politician and businessman
- 27 October – Nathalie Loriers, jazz musician
- 5 December – Patrick Ouchène, singer
- 16 December – Fatima Lamarti, politician

== Deaths ==
- 4 January – Georges Theunis (born 1873), former Prime Minister
- 8 January – Marthe Cnockaert (born 1892), spy
- 10 March – Émile Coulonvaux (born 1892), politician
- 29 March – Albert-Édouard Janssen (born 1883), politician and banker
- 19 April – Albert Servaes (born 1883), painter
- 20 June – Georges Lemaître (born 1894), priest and astrophysicist
- 19 August – François Demol (born 1895), footballer
- 5 December – Sylvère Maes (born 1909), racing cyclist
- 29 December – Pierre Nothomb (born 1887), writer and politician
