= Brausch =

Brausch is a given name and surname. Notable people with the name include:

- Brausch Niemann (born 1939), South African racing driver
- Georges Brausch (1915–1964), British born Belgian colonial administrator
