= 1975 in Belgium =

- Decades: 1950s; 1960s; 1970s; 1980s; 1990s
- See also: Other events of 1975; List of years in Belgium

The following events occurred in Belgium in the year 1975.

== Incumbents ==
- Monarch: Baudouin
- Prime Minister: Leo Tindemans

== Events ==
- 15 February – Doel Nuclear Power Station commissioned
- 30 June — Banque de Bruxelles and Banque Lambert merge to form Bank Brussels Lambert
- 30 December – Law ratifying the intended merger of municipalities passed.

== Births ==
- 15 January – Sophie Wilmès, politician
- 7 April – Darya Safai, politician
- 26 June – Gwendolyn Rutten, politician
- 16 July – Bas Leinders, racing driver
- 6 October — Dave Sinardet, political scientist
- 21 December – Charles Michel, politician

== Deaths ==
- 9 March – Marie Gevers (born 1883), novelist
- 6 May – Fernand Verhaegen (born 1883), artist
- 10 July – Achille Van Acker (born 1898), politician
- 3 August – Karel Bossart (born 1904), engineer
- 15 December – Charles Lambert Manneback (born 1894), engineer
