= 1972 in Belgium =

- Decades: 1950s; 1960s; 1970s; 1980s; 1990s
- See also: Other events of 1972; List of years in Belgium

Events from the year 1972 in Belgium.

== Incumbents ==
- Monarch: Baudouin
- Prime Minister: Gaston Eyskens

== Events ==
- 8 May – Sabena Flight 571 hijacking
- 18 June – UEFA Euro 1972 final tournament at Heysel Stadium
- 12 to 14 November – Cyclone Quimburga

== Publications ==
- Biographie Nationale de Belgique, vol. 37 (supplement 9).
- OECD, Economic Surveys: Belgium–Luxembourg Economic Union
- David Owen Kieft, Belgium's Return to Neutrality: An Essay in the Frustration of Small Power Diplomacy (Oxford, Clarendon Press)
- Robert Senelle, La révision de la Constitution, 1967-1971 (Brussels, Ministère des affaires étrangères)
- P. de Stexhe, La révision de la Constitution belge, 1968-1971 (Brussels and Namur, Larcier and Société d’études morales, sociales et juridiques)
- P. Wigny, La troisième révision de la Constitution (Brussels, Bruylant)

== Births ==
- 1 February – Johan Walem, footballer
- 28 March – Anja Lenaers, cyclist
- 29 March – Jef Desmedt, equestrian
- 6 May – Alain Maron, politician
- 13 May – Stefaan Maene, swimmer
- 24 May – Mimount Bousakla, politician
- 26 May – Jef Aerts, author
- 30 May – Swen Vincke, video game designer
- 23 September – Sam Bettens, musician
- 15 October – Sandra Kim, singer
- 27 October – Anke Van dermeersch, beauty queen
- 6 December – Alex Callier, musician
- 26 December – Gaby Colebunders, politician

== Deaths ==
- 5 January – Gérard Devos, footballer
- 21 January – André Fierens, footballer
- 17 February – François Devries, footballer
- 30 March – Raymond Decorte, cyclist
- 17 April – Jan Engels, cyclist
- 5 June – Louis Mottiat, cyclist
- 7 July – Camille Tihon, archivist
- 20 December – Karel Kaers, cyclist
