= 1967 in Belgium =

- Decades: 1940s; 1950s; 1960s; 1970s; 1980s
- See also: Other events of 1967; List of years in Belgium

Events in the year 1967 in Belgium.

== Incumbents ==
- Monarch: Baudouin
- Prime Minister: Paul Vanden Boeynants

== Events ==
- 13 February – Nocturnal explosion at the law courts on Burg Square damages the stained glass windows of the Basilica of the Holy Blood.
- 1 May – Walter Godefroot wins 1967 Liège–Bastogne–Liège cycling race.
- 22 May – L'Innovation Department Store fire in Brussels.
- 10 October – Belgian Judicial Code adopted.
- 16 October – New NATO headquarters in Brussels inaugurated.

== Publications ==
- Georges Simenon, Le Chat

== Art and architecture ==
Films

- Luc de Heusch (dir.), Jeudi on chantera comme dimanche

== Births ==
- 7 May – Roberto d'Amico, politician
- 10 May – Ilse Uyttersprot, politician (died 2020)
- 21 May – Alain Yzermans, politician

== Deaths ==
- 15 August – René Magritte (born 1898), artist
- 27 December — Marguerite Lefèvre (born 1894), geographer
