= Joris Note =

Belgian writer

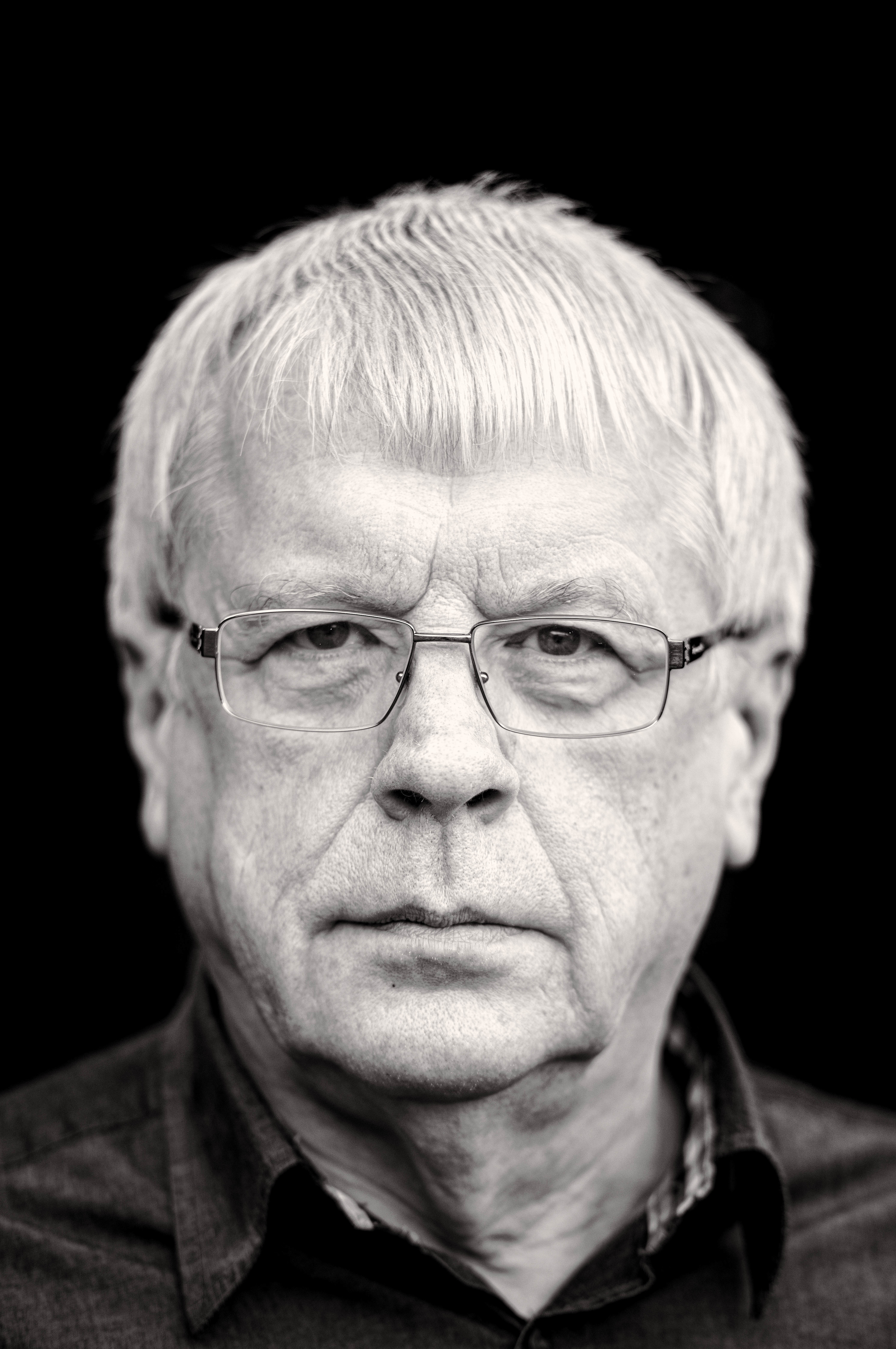
Joris Note photographed by Michiel Hendryckx

Joris Note (born 1949, in Borgerhout) is a Belgian writer.

He graduated in Germanic philology and started his career a scientific assistant Algemene Literatuurwetenschap and as a teacher. Together with Walter van den Broeck and Daniel Robberechts he was for several years an editor of the magazine Heibel. He wrote articles for several newspapers and magazines.

== Bibliography ==
- 1992 - De tinnen soldaat
- 1995 - Het uur van ongehoorzaamheid
- 1999 - Kindergezang
- 2002 - Timmerwerk
- 2006 - Hoe ik mijn horloge stuksloeg
- 2009 - Tegen het einde
- 2012 - Wonderlijke wapens
- 2015 - Van de wereld

== See also ==
- Flemish literature

== Sources ==
- Joris Note (in Dutch)
- Joris Note (in Dutch)
