= 1977 in Belgium =

- Decades: 1950s; 1960s; 1970s; 1980s; 1990s
- See also: Other events of 1977; List of years in Belgium

Events in the year 1977 in Belgium.

== Incumbents ==
- Monarch: Baudouin
- Prime Minister: Leo Tindemans

== Events ==
- 17 April – 1977 Belgian general election
- 5 September – Athus Steelworks closes.
- 11 October – Award of Nobel Prize in Chemistry to Ilya Prigogine announced.

== Publications ==
- J. A. van Houtte, An Economic History of the Low Countries, 800-1800 (London and New York)

== Births ==
- 9 February – Jurgen Van de Walle, road bicycle racer
- 21 March – Ilse Heylen, judoka
- 5 May – Virginie Efira, Belgian and French actress
- 6 May – Christophe Brandt, cyclist
- 1 July – Björn Leukemans, road bicycle racer
- 28 August – Christelle Cornil, actress
- 8 December – Matthias Schoenaerts, actor

== Deaths ==
- 30 January – Raoul Van Overstraeten (born 1885), general
- 29 March – Joseph Lefèvre (born 1893), archivist
