= 1974 in Belgium =

- Decades: 1950s; 1960s; 1970s; 1980s; 1990s
- See also: Other events of 1974; List of years in Belgium

Events in the year 1974 in Belgium.

== Incumbents ==
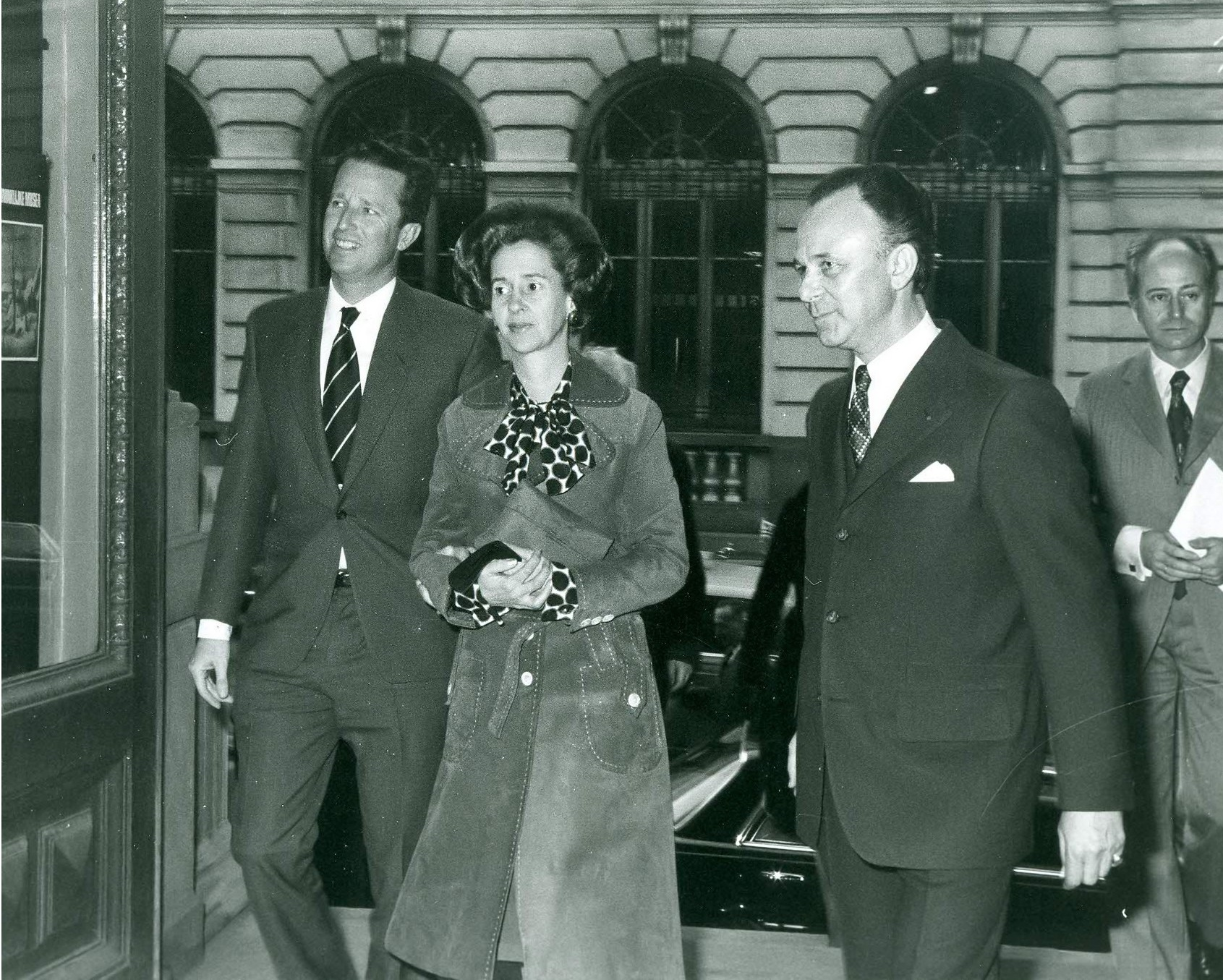
Baudouin (left) and Fabiola (centre) visit the renovated Royal Museums of Fine Arts of Belgium, 26 February 1974

- Monarch: Baudouin
- Prime Minister: Edmond Leburton (to 25 April); Leo Tindemans (from 25 April)

== Events ==
- 23 January – Fire at boarding school in Heusden kills 23 teenagers.
- 10 March – 1974 Belgian general election
- 24 June – Robert-Joseph Mathen becomes Bishop of Namur

== Art and architecture ==
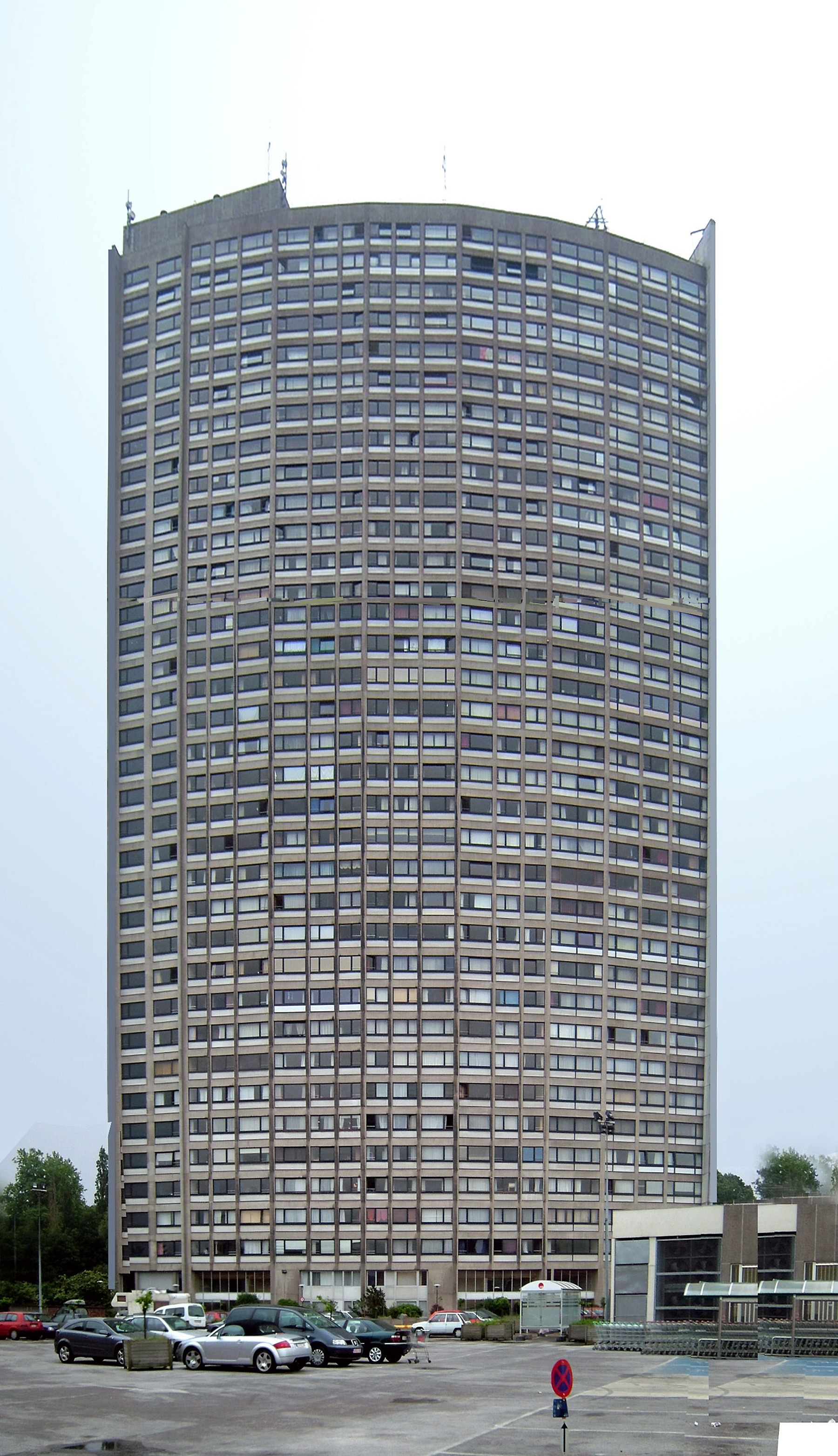
Brusilia building, Brussels

Buildings

- Jacques Cuisinier's Brusilia building in Schaerbeek completed (begun 1970)

== Births ==
- 19 October – Peter Evrard, singer, winner of Idool 2003
- 14 November - Sofie Merckx, politician

== Deaths ==
- 11 July – Karel Maes (born 1900), artist
