= Timeline (picture book) =

2015 picture book by Peter Goes

- Illustrated edition
- Author: Peter Goes
- Translator: Bill Nagelkerke
- Illustrator: Peter Goes
- Language: Dutch
- Genre: Picture book
- Publisher: Gecko Press (United States)
- Publication date: 2015
- Publication place: Belgium
- Media type: Print (hardback)
- Pages: 80
- ISBN: 978-1-776570-69-0
- OCLC: 945785910
- Followed by: Timeline Activity Book

Timeline: A Visual History of Our World is a children's picture book by Belgian author Peter Goes that was published by Gecko Press in 2015. It illustrates the timeline of the world's events from the prehistoric eras to the present, spanning the Big Bang theory, Medieval Europe, civilizations, and the 2010s.

== Summary ==
Timeline looks at the chronological development of the world's culture and events starting from the Big Bang theory to the 21st century. It encompasses historical eras including the Stone Age, Roman and Byzantine empires, and the Islamic Golden Age, as well as "oft-neglected" civilizations such as the Norte Chico and the Indus Valley. The book also depicts the post–World War I period, and concludes with events such as the Fukushima nuclear disaster and the Charlie Hebdo shooting.

== Reception ==
The book met with positive reviews from critics. Imogen Rusell Williams of The Guardian praised the book's narration and illustration, writing, "Timeline: A Visual History of Our World, with its ribbons of pitch black winding through subtly-coloured, deeply involving pages, perfectly lives up to Gecko Press's avowed championing of work 'rich in language and illustration'. In The New York Times, Jennifer Krauss lauded the book as "gigantic, propulsive, lavishly drawn and smartly annotated". She further wrote, "Filled with hidden details and subtle wit, Goes's sweeping graphic history is peopled with endearing Gumby-like worker beings and more richly textured, realistically rendered individual game changers." A positive review by The Wall Street Journal said "Timeline may be most compelling for children over the age of 12". Describing the book as "hugely informative, hugely entertaining", Financial Times's review praised Goes for "creat[ing] a treasure trove of facts and figures" by "combining text with infographics and cartooning".

Reviewing for Reading Time, Stella Lees praised the book, calling it "unusual, full of facts, and pictorially appealing" so therefore "likely to open new vistas for middle school readers". A five-starred review in San Francisco Book Review of Timeline described it as "an amazing pictorial assemblage of historical happenings from civilization's beginning up to the present time" and wrote that the "stunning colorful format with the intriguing figures [...] will capture the interest of young readers and enrapture mature viewers as they reminisce through these historical images." Kirkus Reviews called the book "highly selective with both the hordes of stylized but recognizable artifacts and historical figures and the buckets of specific facts and dates scattered throughout". Publishers Weekly's review concluded that "readers will be left with a powerful sense of how far we have come and how far we have to go.
