= 1969 in Belgium =

- Decades: 1940s; 1950s; 1960s; 1970s; 1980s
- See also: Other events of 1969; List of years in Belgium

Events from the year 1969 in Belgium

== Incumbents ==
- Monarch: Baudouin
- Prime Minister: Gaston Eyskens

== Events ==
- 13 to 20 March — Student protesters occupy the administrative buildings at Ghent University
- July and August – Peaceful resistance organised by local committees in the Marolles neighbourhood of Brussels forces the government to abandon plans to displace hundreds of residents to expand the Palace of Justice.

== Art and architecture ==
Westrand cultural centre in Dilbeek

- 13 September – Frans van Mechelen unboxes the first load of concrete for the Westrand cultural centre in Dilbeek, in lieu of laying a foundation stone.

== Publications ==
- Frank Edward Huggett, Modern Belgium (New York, Praeger)
- First appearance of the Isabelle comic series

== Births ==
- 9 December – Annick Lambrecht, politician

== Deaths ==
- 19 January – Henri Carton de Tournai (born 1878), politician
