= 1965 in Belgium =

- Decades: 1940s; 1950s; 1960s; 1970s; 1980s
- See also: Other events of 1965; List of years in Belgium

Events in the year 1965 in Belgium.

== Incumbents ==
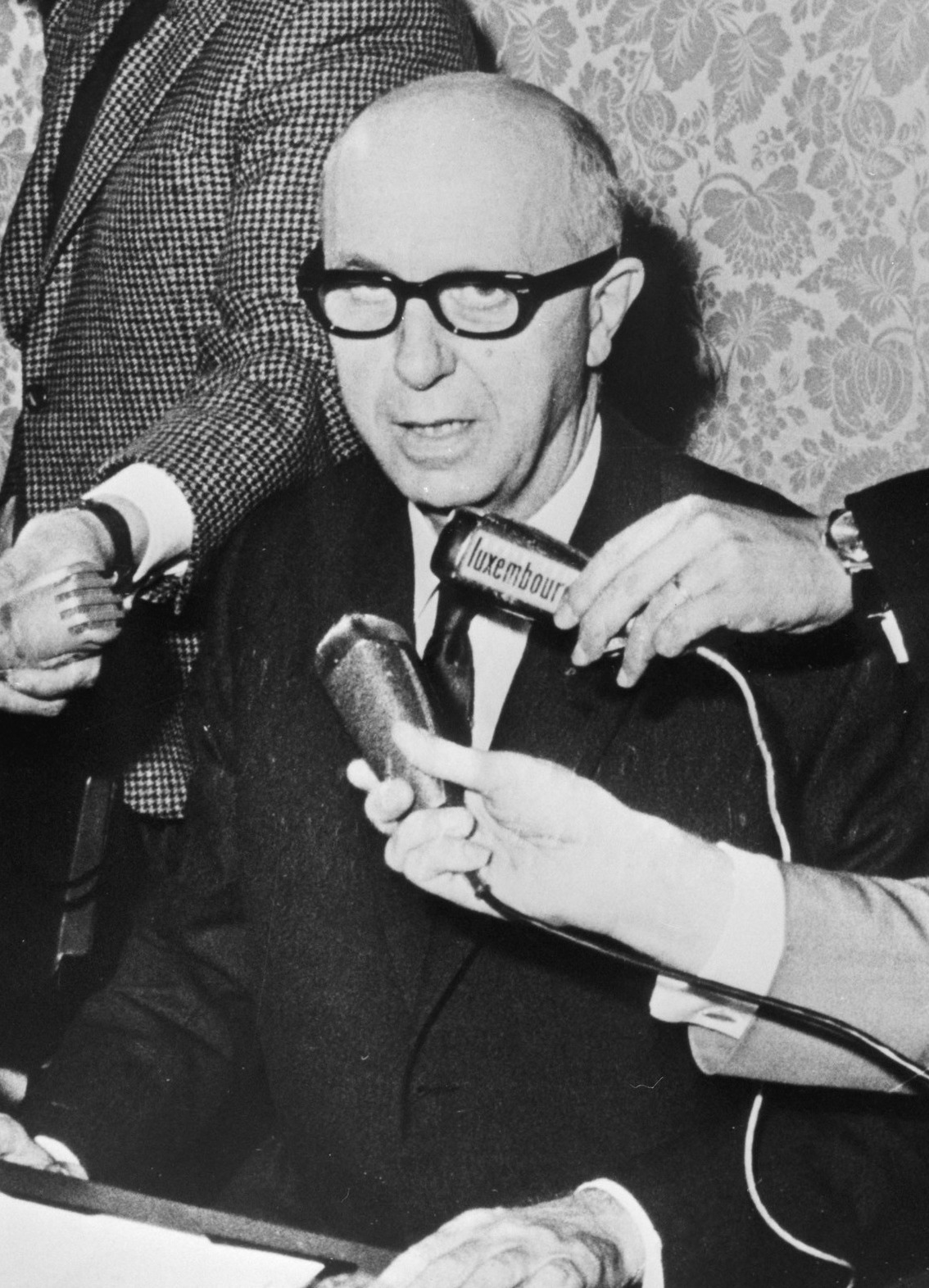
Prime Minister Pierre Harmel (1965)

- Monarch: Baudouin
- Prime Minister: Théo Lefèvre (to 28 July); Pierre Harmel (from 28 July)

== Events ==
- 31 March – Treaty to establish the Benelux Court of Justice signed.
- 23 May – 1965 Belgian general election

== Art and architecture ==
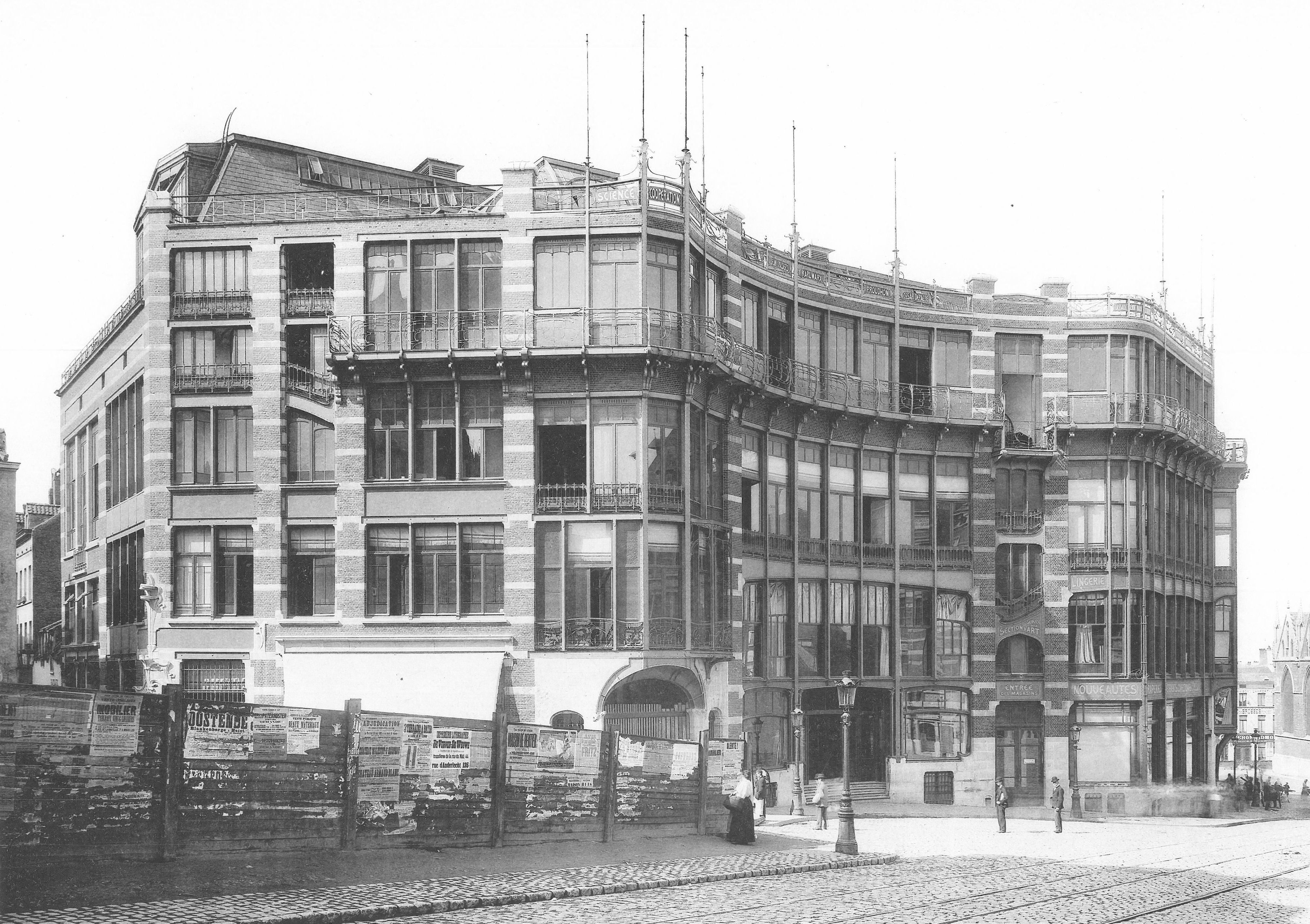
Maison du Peuple, Brussels (demolished 1965)

Buildings

- Victor Horta's Maison du Peuple in Brussels demolished.

== Births ==
- 10 July – Danny Boffin, footballer
