= Sister Leontine =

Belgian Catholic nun, nurse and doctor

Sister Leontine (10 March 1923 – 19 February 2012) was a Belgian Catholic nun, nurse and doctor who is considered the pioneer and promoter of palliative care in Belgium. She set up one of Belgium's first institutionalized care centers for terminally ill people in the Hospital of Saint John in Brussels in 1990.

== Life and work ==
Born Jozefa the Buysscher in Borgerhout, she was the youngest of eight children. She obtained a degree in economics and worked for several years as a bookkeeper. During a summer job at a hospital, she came in contact with the Sisters Hospitallers of Antwerp.

In 1949, she entered the monastery at the Augustinian Sisters Hospitallers of Brussels and worked as a nurse. Later she studied, at the suggestion of the chief doctor, medicine at the Catholic University of Leuven, where she obtained her doctorate in 1964. For 25 years she was the director of the General Hospital of St John in the center of Brussels. Sister Leontine also taught at the Higher Institute of Nursing and Physiotherapy and was a member of the board of the National Association of Catholic Flemish Nurses and Midwives (NVKVV) and the Association of care institutions (VVI).

After her retirement in 1987 and inspired by the work of British nurse Cicely Saunders, she went to study abroad the care of terminally ill patients. In 1990, Sister Leontine opened the first residential unit for palliative care in Belgium in the Hospital of St John. Her program was a "caring" alternative to euthanasia. In 1991 the department was approved and subsidized by the government.

In 1993 sister Leontine receive an honorary doctorate from the Catholic University of Brussels. In 1995 the readers of the newspaper La Libre Belgique elected her personality of the year. She received the Prize ANV-Visser-Neerlandia in 1999. In 2003 sister Leontine received the Grand Cross of the Order of the Crown.

Suffering from dementia, Sister Leontine spent her last days in the palliative care unit she founded. She died on 19 February 2012.

== Works ==
- Sister Léontine (1992). Menswaardig sterven : palliatieve zorgen ... als een mantel om je heen [Humane death: palliative care ... as a cloak around you]. Leuven: Davidsfonds. ISBN 90-6152-769-4.
- Sister Léontine (1995). Waarom nog euthanasie? [Why even euthanasia?]. Leuven: Davidsfonds. ISBN 90-6152-899-2.
