= Borgerhout =

- District of Antwerp
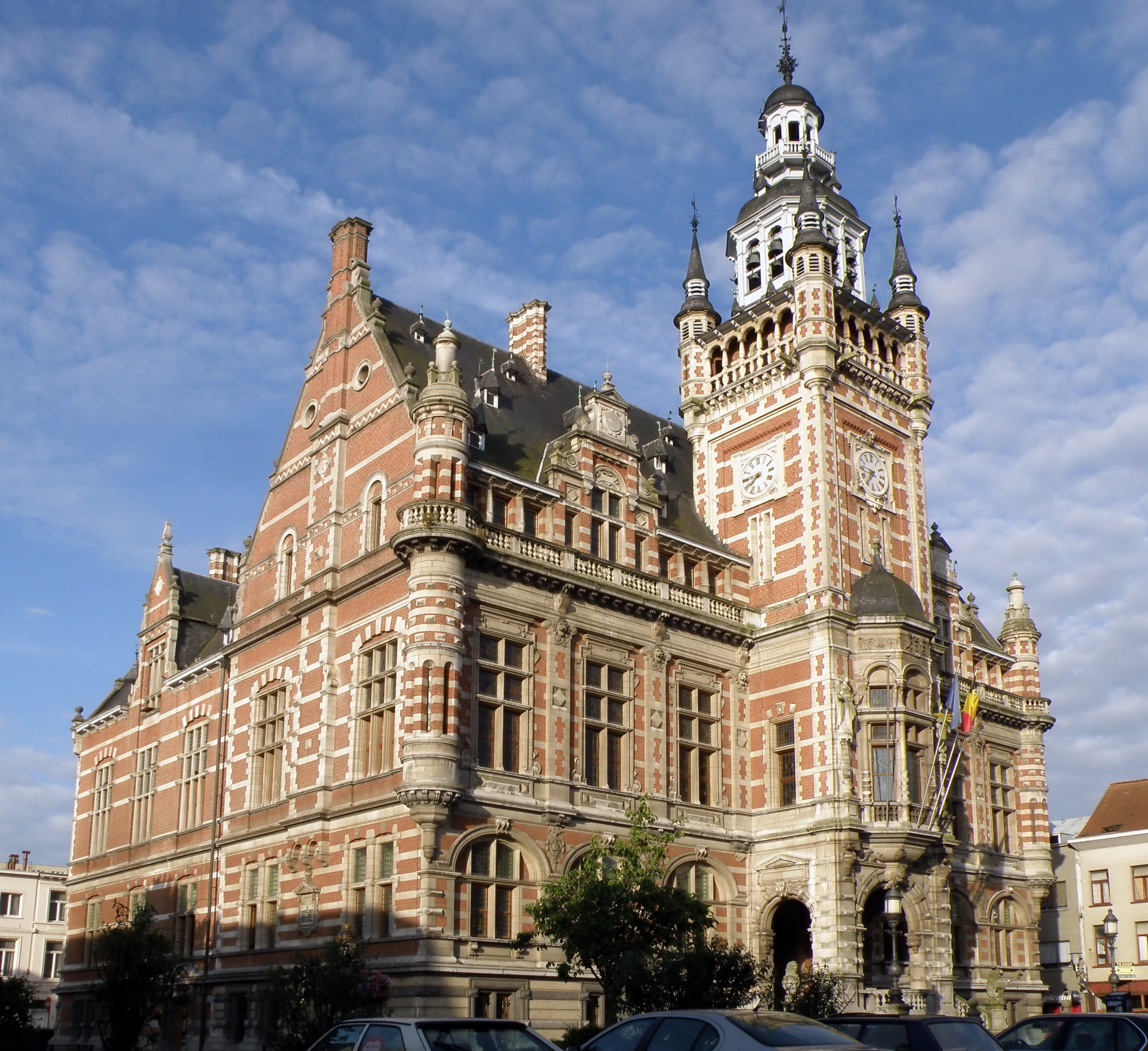
- District House of Borgerhout

- Flag Coat of arms
- Interactive map of Borgerhout
- Location within Belgium Location within Antwerp Province
- Coordinates: 51°13′00″N 4°26′00″E
- Country: Belgium
- Community: Flemish Community
- Region: Flemish Region
- Province: Antwerp
- Arrondissement: Antwerp
- Municipality: Antwerp

Area
  - Total: 3.93 km^{2} (1.52 sq mi)

Population (2025-01-01)
  - Total: 47,188
  - Density: 12,000/km^{2} (31,100/sq mi)
- Postal codes: 2140
- Area codes: 03
- Website: www.antwerpen.be/nl/overzicht/district-borgerhout/nieuws

Borgerhout (Dutch pronunciation: [ˌbɔrɣərˈɦʌut]) is the smallest district of Antwerp, Belgium. As of 2025, the district housed 47,188 inhabitants on 3.93 km².

It was a separate municipality until 1983. On 1 January 1983, it was absorbed into the municipality of Greater Antwerp whereby Borgerhout became one of the 9 districts.

In 2025 Time Out named it the "second coolest neighborhood in the world".

== Etymology ==
"Borger" likely comes from the old spelling for citizen or city dweller; currently, the Dutch word for this is "burger". It might also refer to the word "borgh", meaning a fortress or fortified building. Borghmeester (1254) or borgermeyster (1286) are mentioned in written sources as the word for "mayor", literally "master of the fortress" or "master of the citizens". "Hout" (or previously "holt") means "wood". It is similar to some naming conventions in English, for example "Hollywood". It refers to a time when Borgerhout was still much greener, and had not yet merged with greater Antwerp. It likely also explains the tree on the coat of arms.

== History ==
Borgerhout was first mentioned in the year 1214 in an act written by the Duke of Brabant. It was then named 'Borgerholt'.

== Geography ==
Borgerhout is divided into two parts by a highway and the historical walls. The part inside those walls is "intra muros," meaning (within the walls). It is built around a big boulevard, the Turnhoutsebaan.

== Demographics ==
Borgerhout has an extremely diverse population, with 63% of inhabitants having non-Belgian ancestry, mostly Moroccans and sub-Saharan Africans. Of the nine districts of Antwerp, it has the highest population density.

== Notable people ==
=== Born in Borgerhout ===
- Bachir Boumaaza (born 1980), known by his pseudonym Athene, gaming social activist and internet personality
- Guillaume Geefs (1805–1883), sculptor
- Floris Jespers (1889–1965), painter
- Nahima Lanjri (born 1968), politician
- Sister Leontine (1923–2012), pioneer of palliative care
- Milow (Jonathan Vandenbroeck) (born 1981), singer-songwriter
- André Nelis (1935–2012), sailor
- Joris Note (born 1949), writer
- Stan Ockers (1920–1956), cyclist
- Hugues C. Pernath (1931–1975), poet
- Maria Rosseels (1916–2005), journalist and actor
- Michel Seuphor (1901–1999), artist
- Paul van Morckhoven (1910–1990), dramatist and theatre critic
- Robert Van Straelen (born 1934), economist
- Thomas Vinçotte (1850–1925), sculptor
- Eddy Wauters (born 1933), football player

=== Lived in Borgerhout ===
- Tom De Cock (born 1983), writer and radio DJ
- Saskia De Coster (born 1976), writer
- Bart Martens (born 1969), politician and a member of the SP.A
- Alfred Ost, (1884–1945), artist
- Anne Provoost (born 1964), writer
- Wouter Van Besien (born 1972), politician, chairman of the ecologist party Groen!
- Tom Van Laere (born 1974), musician
- Erik Van Looy (born 1962), film director
- Rik Van Steenbergen (1924–2003), racing cyclist
- Carl Verbraeken (born 1950), president of the Union of Belgian Composers
- Reuskens van Borgerhout
- Anne-Mie Van Kerckhoven (born 1951), artist
- Danny Devos (born 1959), artist

== Gallery ==
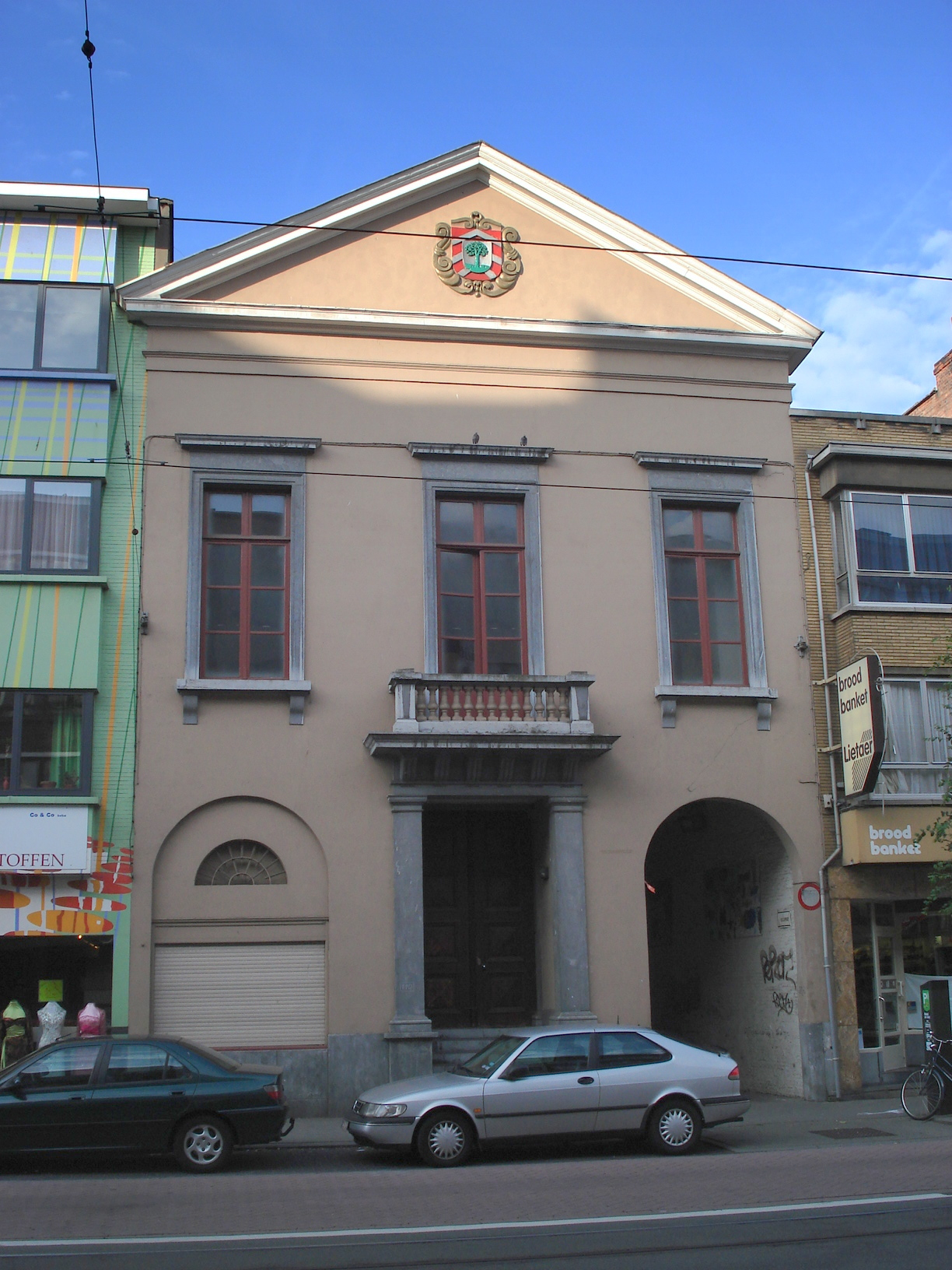
Town hall until 1890

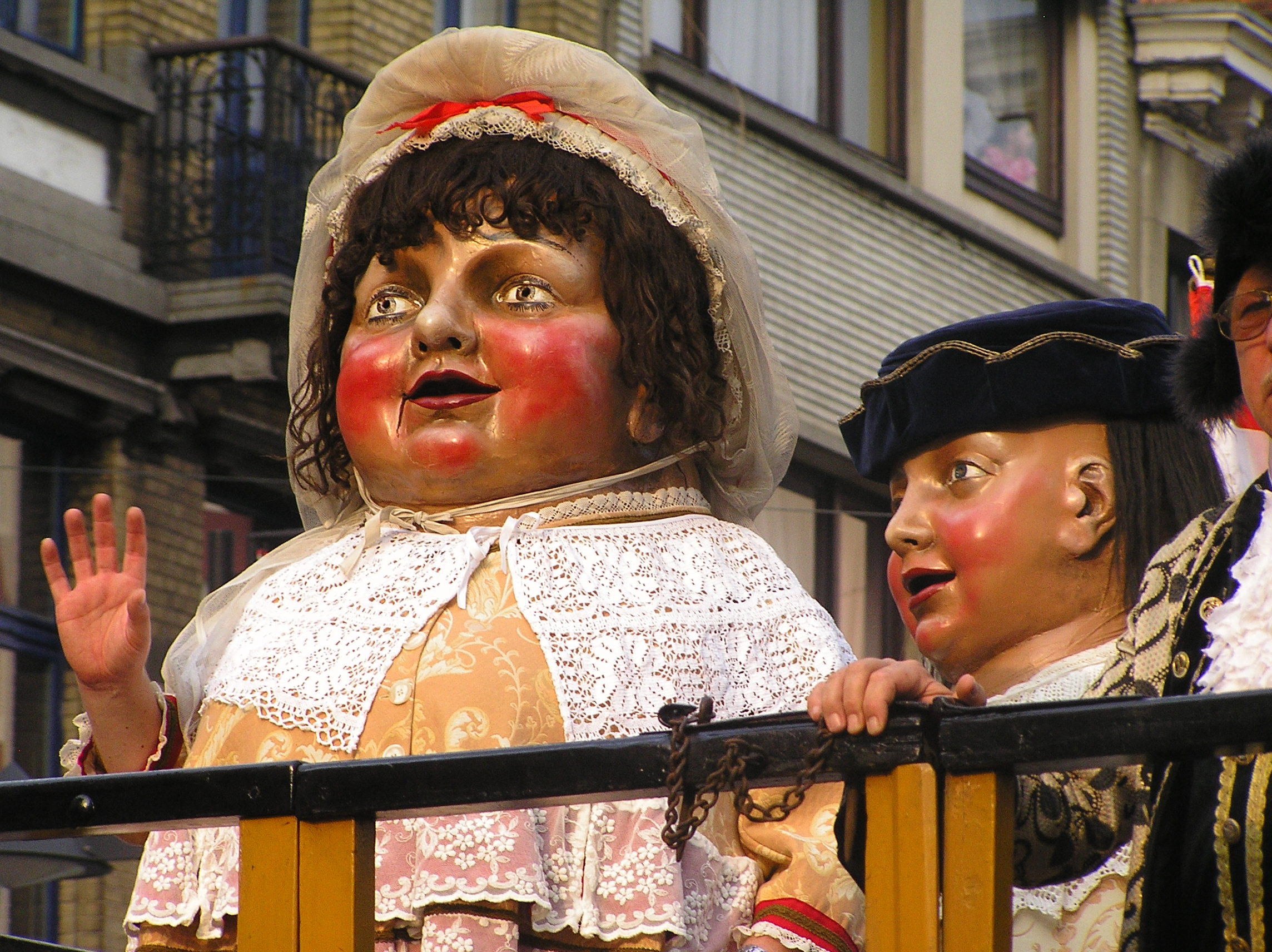
Reuskens of Borgerhout
