= Eddy Wauters =

Belgian footballer and chairman (1933–2025)

- Wauters in 2012

Personal information
- Full name: Eduard Maria Jozef Wauters
- Date of birth: 12 July 1933
- Place of birth: Borgerhout, Belgium
- Date of death: January 24, 2025 (aged 91)
- Position: Defender

Senior career*
| Years | Team | Apps | (Gls) |
| 1951–1965 | Antwerp | 233 | (8) |
| 1956–1957 | New York Hakoah (loan) | | |

International career
| 1959–1960 | Belgium | 4 | (0) |

Managerial career
- 1972: Antwerp
- 1980: Antwerp
- * Club domestic league appearances and goals

Eduard Maria Jozef Wauters (12 July 1933 – 24 January 2025) was a Belgian footballer and chairman of Royal Antwerp Football Club. He was a player at the club and was capped four times by the Belgium national team.

Wouters was chairman of Antwerp for 43 years, from 1969 to 2012. Under his leadership, Antwerp achieved several sporting highlights, including winning the Belgian Cup in 1992 and reaching the European Cup Winners' Cup final in 1993.

In addition to his activities in the football world, Wauters also built a career in the banking sector.

Wauters died on 24 January 2025, at the age of 91.
