= 1973 in Belgium =

- Decades: 1950s; 1960s; 1970s; 1980s; 1990s
- See also: Other events of 1973; List of years in Belgium

Events in the year 1973 in Belgium.

== Incumbents ==
- Monarch: Baudouin
- Prime Minister: Gaston Eyskens (to 26 January); Edmond Leburton (from 26 January)

== Births ==
- 20 January – Queen Mathilde of Belgium
- 12 August – Vanessa Matz, politician

== Deaths ==
- 25 October – Émile Masson (born 1888), cyclist

== Publications ==
- 11 November – Les Cahiers du GRIF is established by Françoise Collin
