= Astro Tower =

Skyscraper in Brussels, Belgium

- Tour Astro (French); Astrotoren (Dutch)
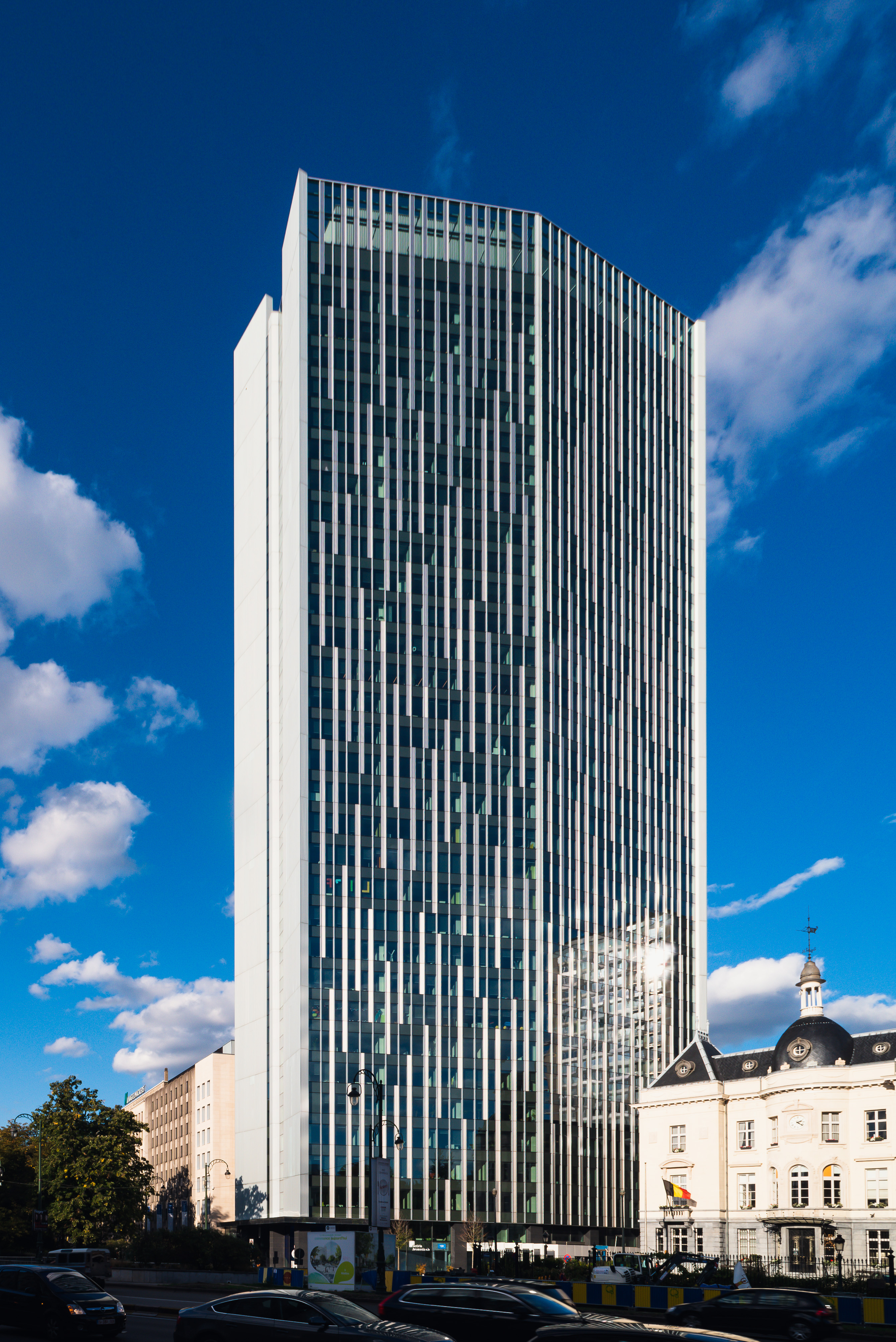
- The Astro Tower seen from the Boulevard Bischoffsheim/Bischoffsheimlaan
- Interactive map of the Astro Tower area

General information
- Status: Completed
- Type: Office building
- Location: Avenue de l'Astronomie / Sterrenkundelaan 14, 1210 Saint-Josse-ten-Noode, Brussels-Capital Region, Belgium
- Coordinates: 50°51′4″N 4°22′11″E
- Construction started: 1972
- Completed: 1976

Height
- Roof: 107 m (351 ft)

Technical details
- Floor count: 31
- Floor area: 36,800 m^{2} (396,000 sq ft)

The Astro Tower (French: Tour Astro; Dutch: Astrotoren) is a skyscraper in Brussels, Belgium. It is located on the north-eastern corner of the Small Ring (Brussels' inner ring road) in the municipality of Saint-Josse-ten-Noode, just north of the Madou Plaza Tower. The Astro Tower is 107 metres (351 ft) tall, making it one of the tallest buildings in Belgium.

The financial firm Fortis Group leased the entirety of the building from 2005 to 2011. From 2011 to 2013, the building underwent extensive renovations. The owner, HPG Belgium NV, sold the Astro Tower to the Spanish investor Luresa in February 2008.

== Gallery ==
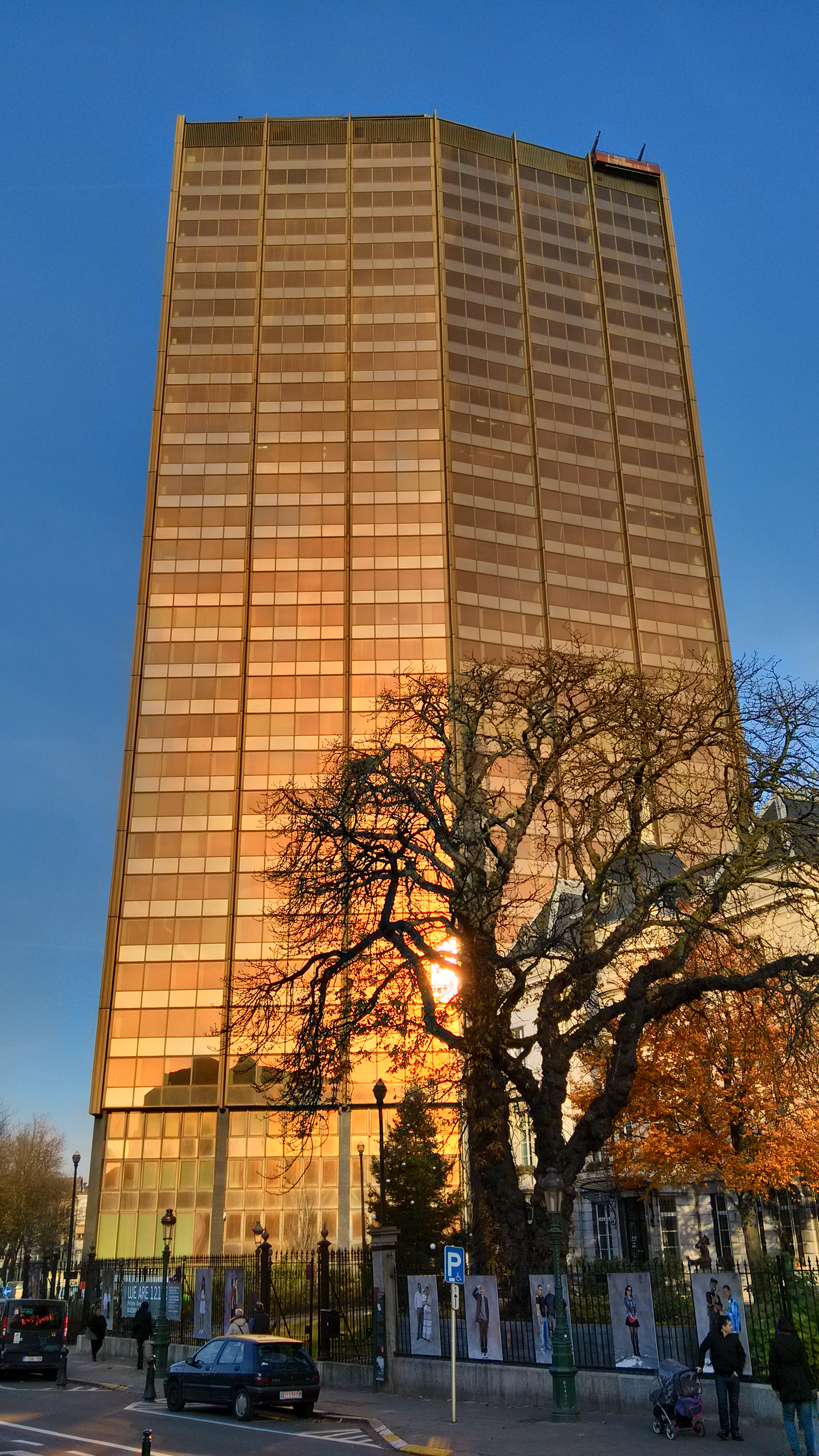
The Astro Tower before renovation, with its original copper-coloured cladding

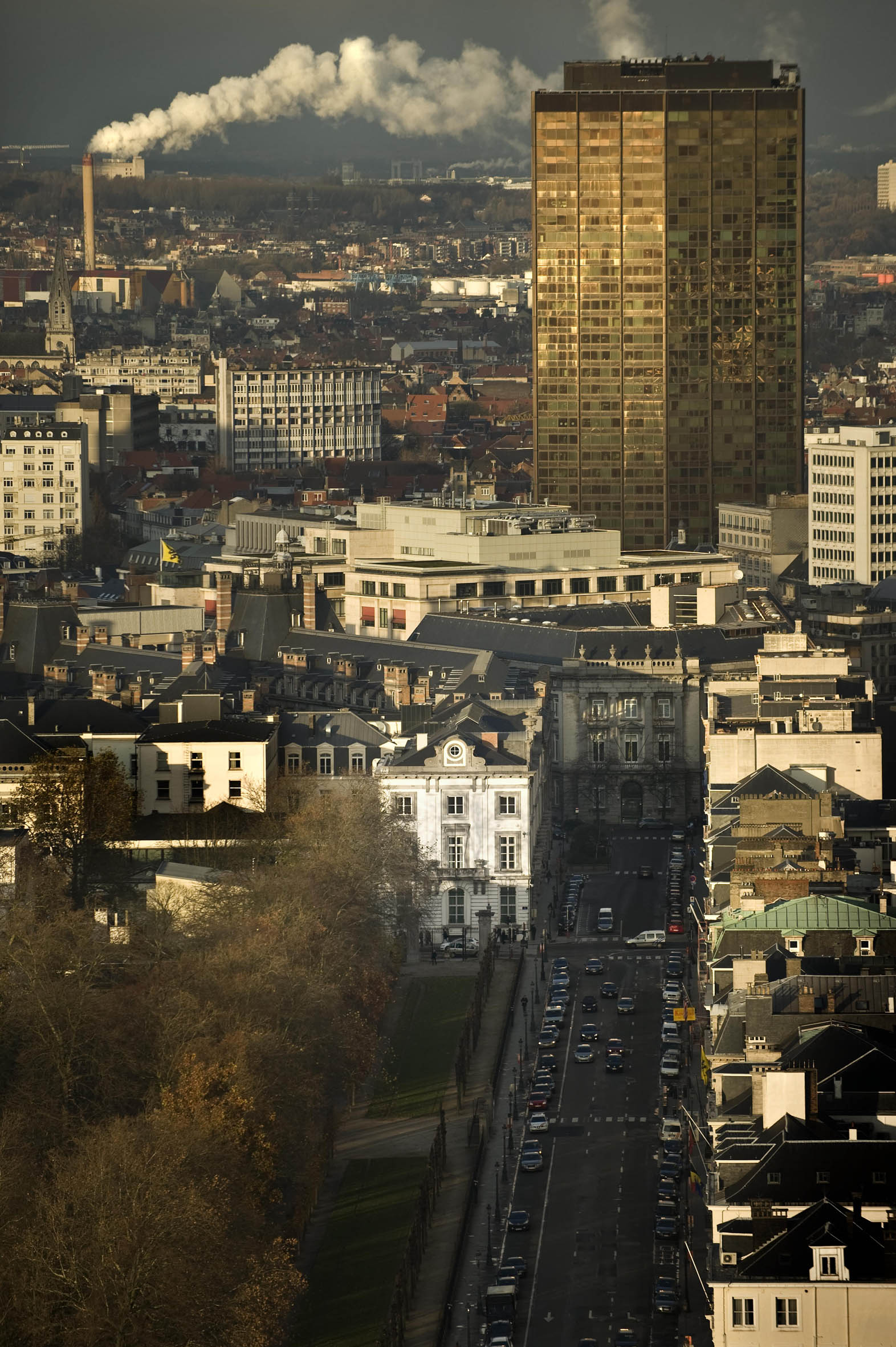
Aerial view before renovation (Rue Ducale/Hertogsstraat in the foreground)

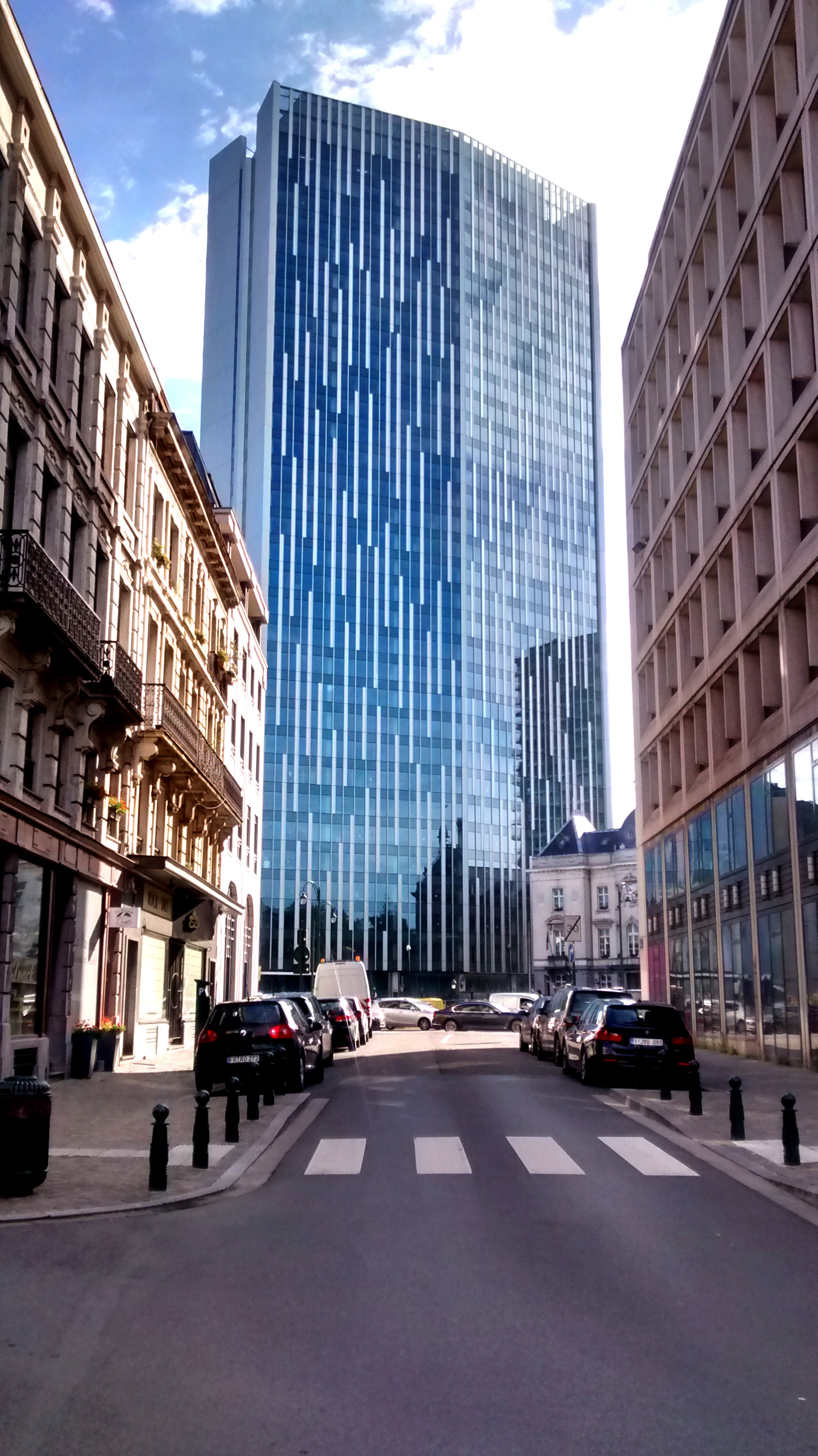
The tower after renovation, seen from the Rue des Cultes/Eredienststraat

== See also ==
- Finance Tower
- North Galaxy Towers
- Madou Plaza Tower
- Proximus Towers
- Rogier Tower
- World Trade Center (Brussels)
