= Paula Marckx =

Belgian model, journalist, and pilot (1925–2020)

Paula Marckx (3 December 1925 – 29 June 2020) was a Belgian life model, journalist and pilot. She was also the plaintiff in Marckx v Belgium. In that landmark case, Belgium was convicted in 1979 of unequal treatment of extra-marital children in the law of ancestry and inheritance by the European Court of Human Rights.

== Biography ==
Marckx was born in the Seefhoek, Antwerp in 1925. During World War II she worked as a painter's life model, and as a photographic model for the fashion house Natan in Brussels. After the war she was active as an entrepreneur and later as journalist. She became one of the first Belgian women pilots. Through these various activities, she met Francisco Franco, Willy Brandt, The Beatles, Paul Anka and Rita Hayworth.

In 1973, Marckx gave birth to a daughter, Alexandra Marckx, while she was not married. It turned out that she had no rights as a mother, and had to start a procedure of recognition. Even with recognition, her daughter would still be considered a stranger to the family. Extra-marital children did not have the same rights at that time as children born in a marriage. To obtain equal rights for her daughter, Marckx initiated proceedings against Belgium at the European Court of Human Rights for violation of Article 8 of the European Convention on Human Rights (right to respect for private and family life) and Article 14 of the European Convention on Human Rights (prohibition of discrimination). As a result of this judgment, both Belgium and other European countries were obliged to implement reforms in their legal systems.

In an interview, Marckx stated that she had had many lovers but never lived with a man for a single day of her life, and had never regretted that decision. Marckx died in Antwerp on 29 June 2020.

== Bibliography ==
Authored by Paula Marckx:

- Economic leaders for and from Antwerp Antwerp: MIM, 1988. ISBN 9789034103246
- Antwerp and its leading companies Antwerp: MIM, 1990. ISBN 9789034104588
- Interviews from the "Gazette van Detroit": profiles of 50 high achievers from Belgium Sevilla: Unibook, 2010.
- The perfect mistress, for small men with large ambitions Central Milton Keynes: AuthorHouse, 2010. ISBN 9781456771676
- Jonger ouder worden Antwerp: Houtekiet, 2017. ISBN 9789089245588

About Paula Marckx:

- Affaire Marckx: décision du 13 mars 1978, arrêt du 13 juin 1979 = Marckx case: decision of 13 March 1978, judgment of 13 June 1979 Strasbourg: Greffe de la Cour, Conseil de l'Europe, 1979 ISBN 9783452187185
- Affaire Marckx = Marckx case Strasbourg: Greffe de la Cour, Conseil de l'Europe, 1982. ISBN 9783452193353
- Paula Marckx: helemaal bloot Antwerp: Houtekiet, 2006. ISBN 9789052409139

Source: Paula Marckx at World Cat
