= Peter Goes =

Belgian author and illustrator (born 1968)

- Born: 1968 (age 57–58); Ghent, East Flanders, Belgium
- Education: Royal Academy of Fine Arts of Ghent
- Occupations: Author; illustrator
- Writing career
- Genre: Children's literature

Peter Goes (born 1968) is a Belgian author and illustrator of children's stories. His best known book is Timeline, described by Financial Times as "hugely informative, hugely entertaining."

Goes was born in Ghent. He has worked as a stage manager. He studied animation at the Royal Academy of Fine Arts of Ghent.

== Books in English ==
- 2015 – Timeline
- 2016 – Timeline Activity Book
- 2017 – Follow Finn
- 2018 – Rivers
