= Fernand Dehousse =

Belgian politician

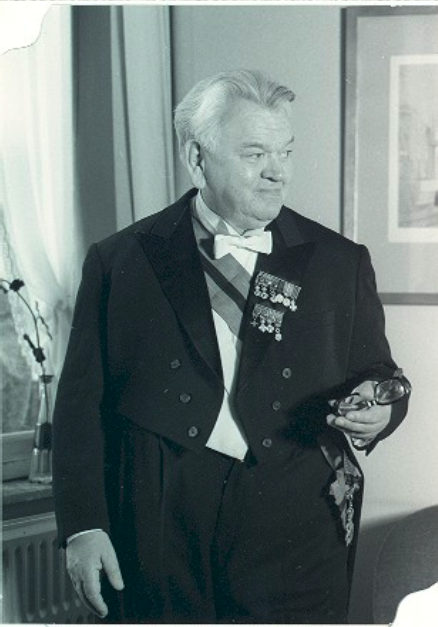
- Born: 3 July 1906; Liège
- Died: 10 August 1976 (aged 70); Liège
- Occupation: politician

Fernand Dehousse OMRI (French: [də.us]; 3 July 1906 – 10 August 1976) was a Belgian politician.

== Biography ==
Originally a Liberal, he went on to join the Socialist Party while he remained a Walloon activist. He was the father of the politician Jean-Maurice Dehousse, grandfather of the lawyer and political scientist Renaud Dehousse, and husband of the philologist Rita Lejeune.

After obtaining degrees in Law and Social Sciences at the University of Liège (1929), Dehousse continued his training in Paris, Grenoble and Geneva from 1929 to 1931. He taught at the Institute of International Law at the University of Liège from 1947. Belgian representative to the United Nations General Assembly from 1946 to 1948 and then from 1951 to 1952, Dehousse was a member of the Economic and Social Council in 1946-1947 and 1950, co-opted as Socialist Senator in 1950, and President of the Parliamentary Assembly of the Council of Europe from 1956 to 1959. He was a member of the European Assembly (now European Parliament) from 17 July 1952 to 2 August 1965 and again from 29 March 1966 to 11 March 1971. As a member of the European Parliament's legal committee, Dehousse wrote the parliamentary report on the "Paramountcy (primauté) of European Law over the Law of the Member States" in May 1965 (doc 43/1965-66), in the wake of the 1964 Costa vs ENEL judgement of the European Court of Justice. When the Western European Union established a Commission for the Referendum in Saarland, Dehousse was appointed President (1955–1956).

== Belgian politics ==
As a Walloon activist, he supported the federalist approach to the future of Belgium. On 20 October 1945, he supported a federalist proposal before the National Walloon Congress, which only received 40% of the votes as against 46% for unity, but which was finally adopted unanimously.

He was Minister of Labour in 1945, Minister of Education in 1965, and Minister of Community Relations from 1971 to 1972.
