= Annemie Bogaerts =

Belgian chemist

Annemie Bogaerts (born 25 October 1971) is a Belgian chemist known for her work in plasma chemistry, plasma-based green chemistry, which include amongst others CO_{2} conversion, CH_{4} conversion for H_{2} synthesis or the synthesis of hydrocarbons and N_{2} fixation as basis for fertilizer production, as well as for her work in plasma medicine for cancer treatment, and the use of laser ablation to sample chemicals and form plasmas. She is a full professor of chemistry at the University of Antwerp.

== Education and career ==
Bogaerts is originally from Wilrijk, a district of Antwerp. She studied chemistry at the University of Antwerp, earning a master's degree there in 1993 and completing her Ph.D. in 1996. She remained at the University of Antwerp as a postdoctoral researcher, including some research stays abroad, until 2004, when she obtained a faculty position there. She has been a full professor since 2014.

She is head of the research group PLASMANT, and co-founder of D-CRBN.

== Recognition ==
Bogaerts is a member of the Royal Flemish Academy of Belgium for Science and the Arts, and the Academia Europaea. She has received major European research funding and distinctions in plasma physics and chemistry
