= Bart Van den Bossche =

Flemish singer and presenter

Bart Erna Paul Van den Bossche
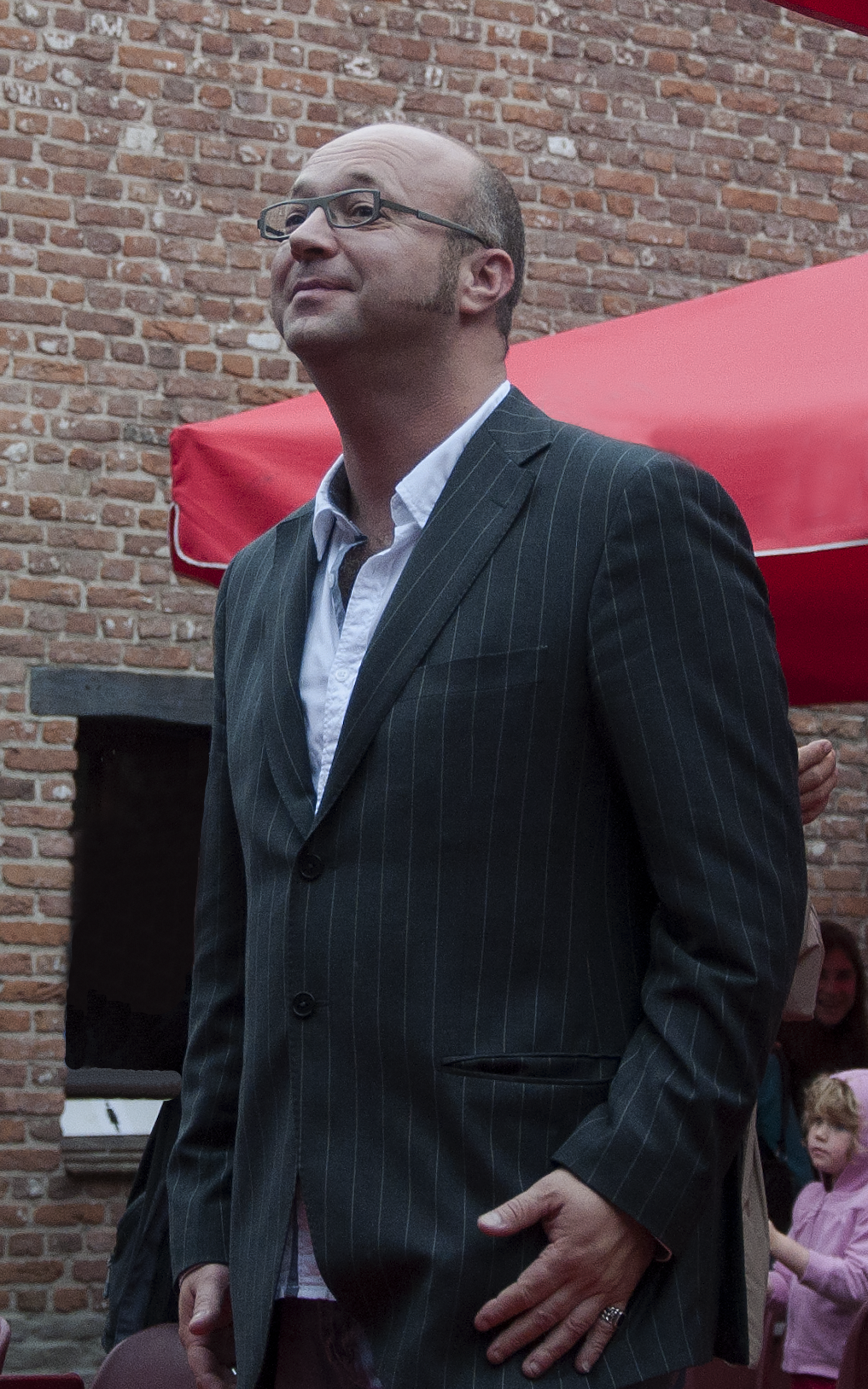
- Born: 17 April 1964; Ostend, Belgium
- Died: 6 January 2013 (aged 48); Lint, Belgium
- Occupations: actor, television presenter, singer

Bart Van den Bossche (17 April 1964 – 6 January 2013) was a Flemish singer, actor and radio and television presenter.

== Life ==
He was born in Ostend, Belgium but grew up in Kortrijk, to which he dedicated his song "De stad van mijn jeugd" (The town of my youth). During his humanities studies he started to play the guitar and sing. After graduation, he went to the Brussels conservatorium. His musical style was heavily influenced by Johan Verminnen and Raymond van het Groenewoud, mentioned in his song "'k Heb bijna alles" (I have nearly everything).

His first hit Overstuur came out in 1986.

As an actor, he took part in the play Maria Viers lokaal in 1989/1990. He also presented the VTM programs Videodinges, Kok en Cº, De dag van 100,000 and Haha Reclame, and the radio programs Het leven is mooi (Radio 2) and VDB.

Bart Van den Bossche died on 6 January 2013 from the effects of a traumatic aortic rupture.

== Discography ==
- 1992: Bouillon de charme
- 1992: De heuveltjes van Erika (single)
- 1993: Wakker!
- 1996: Kermis in de Hel
- 1998: Het houdt nooit op
- 1999: Bijna Alles, a "best of" double CD.
- 2002: De Zotte Avond
