= Aloïs Simon =

Belgian historian and professor

Aloïs Jacques Victor Marie Simon (1897–1964) was a Belgian historian and professor at the University Faculty of Saint-Louis in Brussels, with a particular interest in 19th-century Belgian Church history from the perspectives of Church–State relations and international diplomacy.

== Life ==
Simon was born in Antwerp on 25 November 1897. He received his education at the Institut Sainte-Marie, Schaerbeek, and the Major Seminary, Mechelen. He was ordained to the priesthood on 1 January 1922, and was sent to the Catholic University of Leuven for further study in history. He graduated from the university in 1924. Until the Second World War, he was involved in secondary education, first as a teacher and later as the head of the Institut Saint-Boniface, Ixelles. In 1942, he was asked to take over the teaching of undergraduate history at the Institut Saint-Louis. This was an emergency appointment, but he remained in the position for the next 20 years. On 2 May 1960, he was elected as a corresponding member of the Royal Academy of Science, Letters and Fine Arts of Belgium.

He died in Brussels on 7 December 1964. A memorial volume was published in 1975, L'Église et l'État à l'époque contemporaine: Mélanges dédiés à la mémoire de Mgr Aloïs Simon, edited by Gaston Braive and Jacques Lory.

== Publications ==
Simon was a member of the editorial committee of the Biographie Nationale de Belgique, and contributed a number of articles to the series.

His other works include:

- L'archiduchesse Isabelle: son temps et son âme (Brussels, Éditions universitaires, 1946)
- L'Eglise catholique et les débuts de la Belgique indépendante (Wetteren, Scaldis, 1949)
- Le Cardinal Sterckx et son temps, 1792–1867 (Wetteren, Scaldis, 1950)
- La Liberté d'enseignement en Belgique: essai historique (Liège, La pensée catholique, 1951)
- La politique religieuse de Léopold Ier (Brussels, Goemaere, 1953)
- Correspondance du Nonce Fornari, 1838-1843 (Brussels, Institut historique belge de Rome, 1956)
- Documents relatifs à la nonciature de Bruxelles, 1834-1838 (Brussels, Institut historique belge de Rome, 1958)
- Le Parti Catholique belge, 1830–1945 (Brussels, La renaissance du livre, 1958)
- Lettres de Pecci, 1843–1846 (Brussels, Institut historique belge de Rome, 1959)
- Le cardinal Mercier (Brussels, La renaissance du livre, 1960)
- Réunions des évêques de Belgique, 1830-1867: procès-verbaux (Leuven, Nauwelaerts, 1960)
- Réunions des évêques de Belgique, 1868-1883: procès-verbaux (Leuven, Nauwelaerts, 1961)
- Evêques de la Belgique indépendante, 1830–1940: sources d'archives (Leuven, Nauwelaerts, 1961)
- Instructions aux nonces de Bruxelles, 1835–1889 (Brussels, Institut historique belge de Rome, 1961)
- Léopold Ier (Brussels, La renaissance du livre, 1963)
- L'Église Catholique et les Droits de l'Homme (Brussels, La renaissance du livre, 1963)
