= Marckx v Belgium =

Marckx v. Belgium (application No. 6833/74) was a landmark case in family law decided by the European Court of Human Rights in 1979.

== Facts ==
Ms. Paula Marckx, being unmarried, gave birth to a daughter in 1973. Under Belgian law, no legal bond between an unmarried mother and her child resulted from the mere fact of birth. To create the bond, the mother had either to recognise maternity in specific proceedings or to adopt the child. In both cases, the child's inheritance rights remained less than those a child born in marriage received automatically.

== Judgment ==
The Court held that there had been breaches of:

- Article 8 of the European Convention on Human Rights (private and family life),
- Article 14 of the Convention (non-discrimination), taken in conjunction with Article 8,
- Article 14, taken in conjunction with Article 1 of Protocol No. 1 (property rights),

and no breach of Article 1 of Protocol No. 1, taken alone. The Court awarded no compensation to the applicants.

Judges Balladore Pallieri, Pedersen, Ganshof van der Meersch, Evrigenis, Pinheiro Farinha and Eduardo García de Enterría filed a joint dissent concerning refusal of compensation.

Judges O’Donoghue, Thór Vilhjálmsson, Fitzmaurice, Bindschedler-Robert, Matscher and Pinheiro Farinha filed separate dissents concerning various points of the judgment.

== Aftermath ==
In 1987, Belgium amended its Civil Code, and in 1988, the Committee of Ministers of the Council of Europe decided that Belgium has exercised its functions under Article 54 of the Convention in this case.

== Literature ==
Goldbacher M. D. A People's History of the European Court of Human Rights. 2007. ISBN 978-0-8135-3983-6. pp. 15–25

== Links ==
- Role of the European Court of Human Rights - Paula Marckx' case Federal Public Service Foreign Affairs
