= Paul van Morckhoven =

Paul van Morckhoven was the pen name of Jozef Lode Jozefina Pauwels (1910–1990), a Belgian dramatist and theatre reviewer writing in Dutch.

== Biography ==
Pauwels was born in Borgerhout on 25 March 1910 and worked as a school teacher until 1960. From 1956 to 1972 he was chair of the Society of Flemish Playwrights, and from 1952 to 1969 editor of the theatre periodical Het toneel. He died in Antwerp on 11 January 1990.

== Works ==
=== Plays ===
- Karel van Denemarken (1942)
- Het buitenkansje (1955)
- Bartolomeusnacht (1956)
- De gekroonde laars (1975), an adaptation of Michiel de Swaen's De gecroonde leersse (1687)
- De Datzja (1977)

=== Non-fiction ===
- Het Amerikaans toneel (1953)
- with Luc André, Het hedendaags toneel in België (1969)
  - in English translation as Contemporary Belgian Theatre (Brussels, Belgian Information and Documentation Institute, 1970)
