= Elisa Brune =

Belgian writer and journalist (1966–2018)

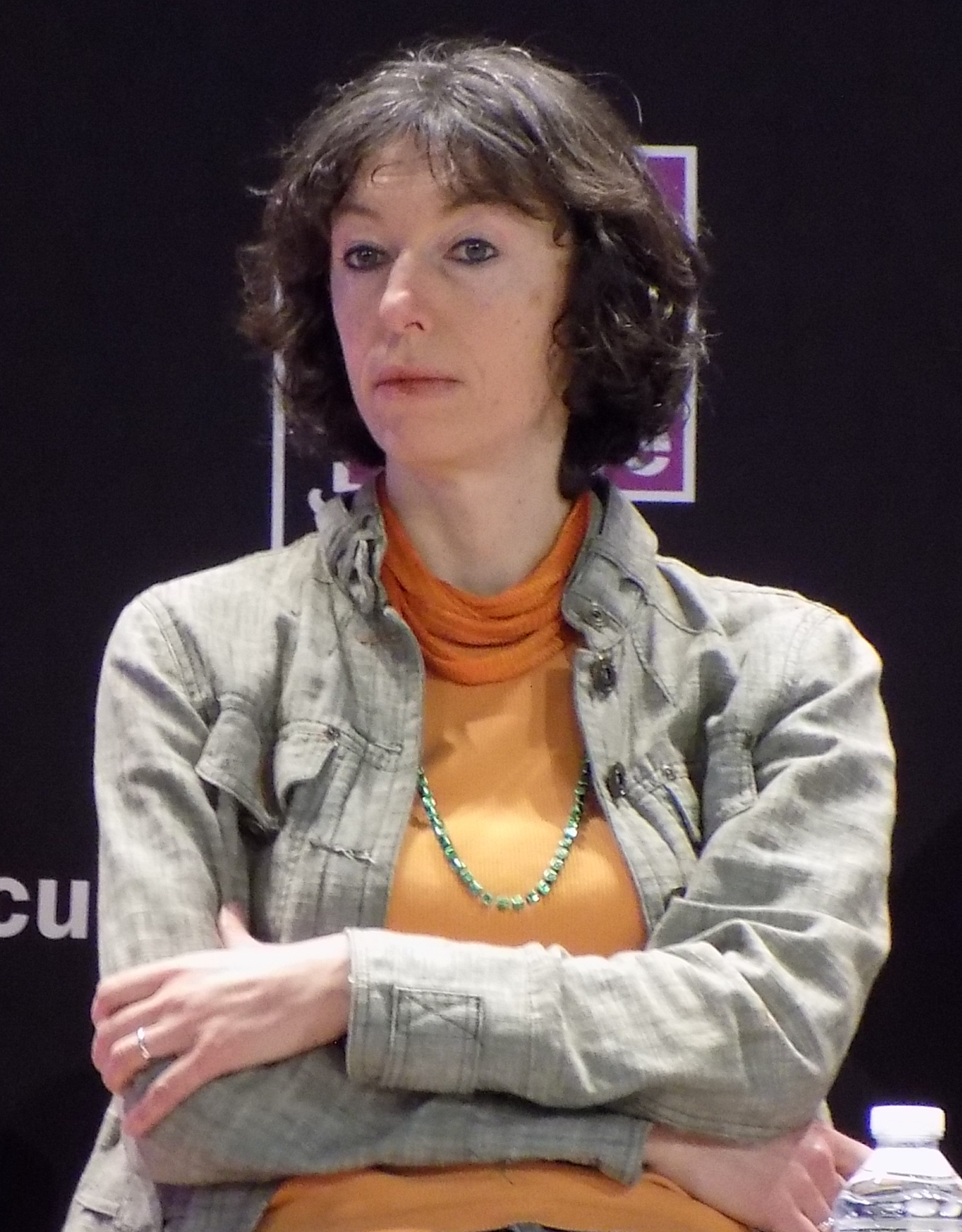
- Born: 15 July 1966; Brussels
- Died: 29 November 2018 (aged 52); Brussels
- Occupations: writer and journalist

Elisa Brune (15 July 1966 – 29 November 2018) was a Belgian writer and journalist. She held a doctorate in environmental science.

== Works ==
- Fissures. Paris : L’Harmattan, 1996 (lauréat du prix de la Première Œuvre et du prix Maeterlinck); Ancrage, 2000
- Petite révision du ciel. Paris : Ramsay, 1999 (récompensé par le prix Emma du Cayla-Martin et le Grand Prix France/Wallonie Bruxelles); J'ai lu 2000
- Blanche Cassé. Paris : Ramsay, 2000 (prix de la rédaction du magazine Gaël)
- La Tournante. Paris : Ramsay 2001; J'ai Lu, 2003
- Les Jupiter chauds. Paris: Belfond 2002; Labor, 2006
- La Tentation d'Edouard. Paris : Belfond, 2003
- Le goût piquant de l'univers : Récit de voyage en apesanteur. Paris : Le Pommier, 2004
- Relations d'incertitude (avec Edgard Gunzig). Paris : Ramsay, 2004 (Prix Victor-Rossel des jeunes); Labor 2006
- Un homme est une rose. Paris : Ramsay, 2005
- De la transe à l'hypnose: récit de voyage en terrain glissant. Éditions Bernard Gilson, 2006
- Le Quark, le neurone et le psychanalyste. Paris : Le Pommier, 2006
- Séismes et volcans - Qu'est-ce qui fait palpiter la Terre?, (avec Monica Rotaru). Paris, Le Pommier, 2007
- Alors heureuse... croient-ils! La vie sexuelle des femmes normales. Paris : Le Rocher, 2008
- Bonnes nouvelles des étoiles, avec Jean-Pierre Luminet, Paris, Odile Jacob, 2009

Prix Manlev-Bendall de l'Académie Nationale des sciences, belles-lettres et arts de Bordeaux

- Le secret des femmes, Voyage au coeur du plaisir et de la jouissance, avec Yves Ferroul, Paris, Odile Jacob, 2010
- La mort dans l'âme - Tango avec Cioran, Paris, Odile Jacob, 2011

Prix de la Société des Gens de Lettres

- La révolution du plaisir féminin - Sexualité et orgasme, Paris, Odile Jacob, 2012
