= Georges Brausch =

Belgian administrator and scholar

Georges Edouard Jean Baptiste Brausch (31 October 1915 – 27 June 1964) was a British born Belgian colonial administrator, ethnographer and academic scholar.

== Biography ==
He studied at the Colonial University of Belgium, after which he began a career in colonial administration. His first post was as territorial administrator of Kasaï in the Belgian Congo. His research led him to be appointed Artium Magistri in social ethnology in the Department of Bantu Studies in the University of Witwatersrand in Johannesburg. Between 1954 and 1957 he was also a professor of the Institut d'Etudes sociales d'Outre-mer of Antwerp. In 1960 he became the director of the Institut d'études sociales d'Elisabethville in Katanga. He died in London on 27 June 1964.

== Major works ==
While living abroad, he observed African social and cultural practices as an ethnographer and wrote prolifically on the subject matter, publishing his works in French, Dutch and English. The first article to be published in 1957 was Le paternalisme: une doctrine belge de politique indigène (19808-1933) which discussed Belgium's paternalism in foreign policy towards its colony in the Congo. His most famous work was the monograph 'Belgian Colonial Administration' published in 1961. In between 1957 and 1961 he published a number of smaller articles dealing with a number of topics, including the article Le Problème des élites au Congo belge and Pluralisme ethnique et culturel au Congo Belge.
