= Jacques Stiennon =

Jacques Stiennon (1 May 1920 – 5 May 2012) was a Belgian medievalist who worked as a librarian and a professor of history at the University of Liège. His main research interests were in the history of the principality of Liège and of Wallonia, especially with regard to monastic history, art and archaeology.

== Life ==
Stiennon was born in Liège on 1 May 1920. He obtained a doctorate in history from Liège University in 1948, while working as a university librarian (1945–1965). He was one of the organisers of the Congrès culturel wallon (Walloon cultural congress) of October 1955. In 1965 he was appointed to a professorship in the university. In 1972 he started the university's first course in codicology. He was particularly influential in the related fields of palaeography and diplomatics.

He died in Liège on 5 May 2012.

== Publications ==
- Étude sur le Chartrier et le domaine de l’abbaye de Saint-Jacques de Liège, 1015–1209 (1951)
- L’écriture diplomatique dans le diocèse de Liège du IXe au milieu du XIIIe siècle. Reflet d’une civilisation (1960)
- with Rita Lejeune, La Légende de Roland dans l'art du Moyen Âge (2 vols, 1966)
- Paléographie du Moyen Âge (1973, much reprinted)
- L’écriture (1995) – in the Brepols series "Typologie des sources du Moyen Âge occidental"
- with Rita Lejeune, eds., La Wallonie. Le Pays et les Hommes: Arts, Lettres, Cultures (4 vols, 1978–1981)
- Histoire de Liège (1991)
- Un Moyen Âge pluriel (1999) – selected essays
