= Rita Lejeune =

Belgian philologist (1906–2009)

Professor Rita Lejeune
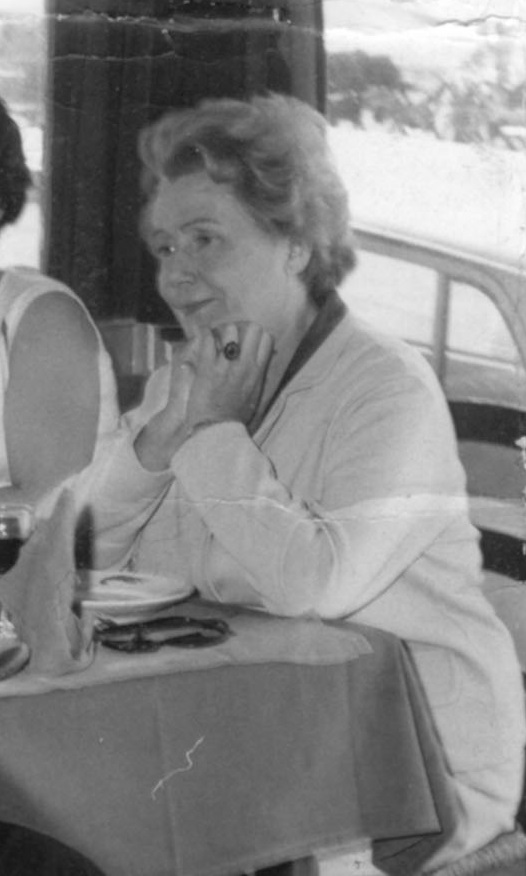
- Born: 22 November 1906; Herstal, Liège Province, Belgium
- Died: 18 March 2009 (aged 102); Liège, Liège Province, Belgium
- Spouse: Fernand Dehousse
- Children: Jean-Maurice, Françoise

Academic background
- Education: University of Liège
- Thesis: Une figure originale du début du XIIIe siècle: Jean Renart (1928)
- Influences: Ferdinand Lot

Academic work
- Discipline: Romance philology
- Sub-discipline: Medieval French literature
- Institutions: University of Liège
- Notable works: Recherches sur le thème: les chansons de geste et l’histoire (1948); with Jacques Stiennon, La Wallonie, le pays et les hommes: Lettres – arts – culture (4 vols, 1977-1981)

Rita Lejeune (1906–2009) was a Belgian philologist who became a leading expert in the study of medieval French literature.

== Life ==
Lejeune was born in Herstal on 22 November 1906. Her father, Jean Lejeune, was a local government clerk and also a poet under the pen name Jean Lamoureux. He died in the 1918 influenza pandemic shortly before her twelfth birthday. After secondary school she became a student and then a researcher at the University of Liège, obtaining her doctorate in 1928 with a thesis on Jean Renart. She married Fernand Dehousse in 1929 and together they had two children. In the meantime she also studied at the École pratique des hautes études in Paris. In 1937 she began teaching at Liège University, and in 1954 she was appointed full professor in the department of Romance philology there. Her primary research interests were chansons de geste and chivalric romances, but she also developed an interest in Walloon literature. She died in Liège on 18 March 2009, and was buried in the churchyard of Notre-Dame de la Licourt in Herstal.

== Honours ==
Lejeune became a corresponding member of the Royal Academy of Science, Letters and Fine Arts of Belgium on 5 December 1977 and a full member on 2 May 1988.
