= Gustave Magnel =

Belgian civil and structural engineer (1889–1955)

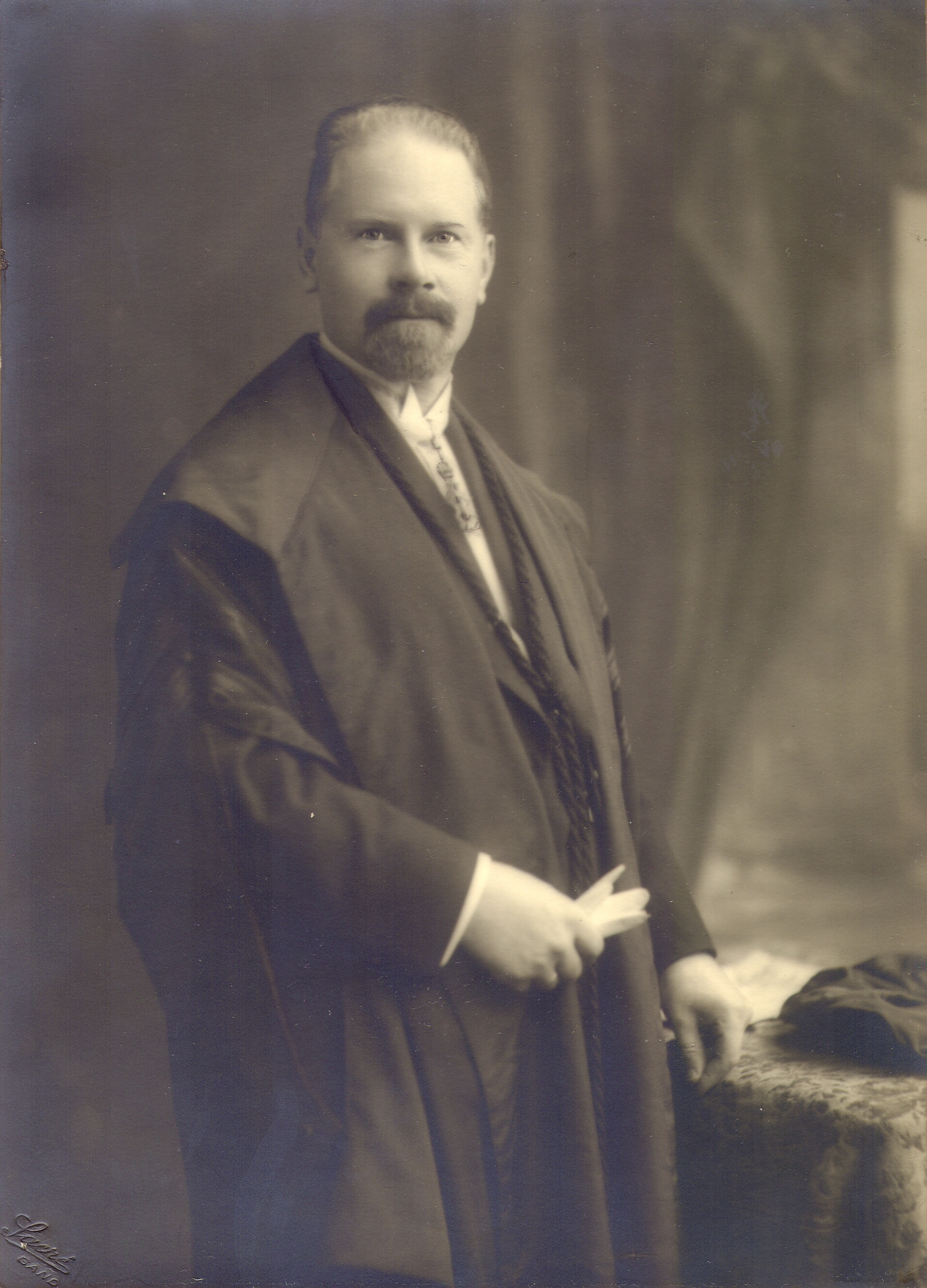
- Magnel, professor at Ghent University
- Born: Gustaaf Paul Robert Magnel; 15 September 1889; Essen, Belgium
- Died: 5 July 1955 (aged 65); Ghent, Belgium
- Education: Ghent University
- Engineering career
- Discipline: Civil engineering, structural engineering
- Institutions: Ghent University
- Projects: Walnut Lane Memorial Bridge; Sclayn Bridge; Blaton–Magnel post-tensioning system

Gustave Magnel (15 September 1889 – 5 July 1955) was a Belgian structural engineer and professor at Ghent University, known for his contributions to reinforced concrete and prestressed concrete. He was one of the main figures in the international development and dissemination of prestressed concrete in the mid-twentieth century across Europe and North America.

Magnel founded the Laboratory for Reinforced Concrete at Ghent University in 1926, which became an internationally recognised centre for full-scale testing of concrete structures. During and after the Second World War, he worked with the Brussels contractor Blaton-Aubert on the post-tensioning method known as Blaton–Magnel system. Through his teaching, experimental research, publications, and engineering projects, he played a key role in transforming prestressed concrete from an experimental technique into a practical method for structural design.

His most notable works include the Sclayn Bridge in Belgium, one of the earliest continuous prestressed concrete bridges, and the Walnut Lane Memorial Bridge in Philadelphia, the first major prestressed concrete bridge in the United States. Together engineers such as Eugène Freyssinet and Ulrich Finsterwalder, he is regarded as a central figure in the early history of prestressed concrete and its international development.

== Early life and education ==
Gustave (Note: Dutch-language sources often use the form Gustaaf Magnel, while French- and English-language engineering literature generally uses Gustave Magnel.) Paul Robert Magnel was born in Essen, near the Belgian-Dutch border, on 15 September 1889. His father, Louis Magnel, worked in the customs service. Magnel studied civil engineering at Ghent University, where engineering instruction was then still largely in French. He graduated in 1912 with the diploma of civil construction engineer.

As a student and young engineer, Magnel published articles on descriptive geometry, structural calculation and related engineering problems in local engineering journals, anticipating a career that combined teaching, practical calculation, experimental testing, and structural design.

== First World War and early career ==
After a short period as an assistant at Ghent University, Magnel left Belgium for the United Kingdom following the outbreak of the First World War. From 1914 to 1919 he worked for the London contractor D. G. Somerville & Co. The firm employed engineers from the Continent to train British graduates in reinforced concrete, a subject then receiving limited attention in British university engineering curricula. After becoming chief engineer in 1917, he was subsequently appointed head of the Somerville office in Paris, responsible for the design of reinforced concrete structures. The British period influenced Magnel's later teaching. It gave him command of English and experience in explaining reinforced concrete design to engineers who had not received systematic instruction in the subject.

After returning to Ghent in 1919, he joined the university laboratory for strength of materials and also worked as a répétiteur in algebra and analytic geometry. In 1922, Magnel obtained permission to give an elective course on the practical calculation of reinforced concrete. The course was incorporated into the formal civil-engineering curriculum in 1927. He was appointed docent in 1927, extraordinary professor in 1932, and full professor by royal decree in 1937.

Magnel was also associated with several university building projects in Ghent. He contributed to the concrete engineering of the Boekentoren, the university library designed by Henry van de Velde, and to other university works including the Technicum and the academic hospital.

== Laboratory for Reinforced Concrete at Ghent University ==
Magnel's academic career developed alongside his effort to establish experimental concrete research at Ghent. In 1926 he founded the Laboratory for Reinforced Concrete at the request of the Belgian State railways, originally housed in the basement of the former Flandria Palace Hotel near Ghent-Sint-Pieters railway station, built in 1912–1913 for the 1913 Ghent International Exposition. The laboratory became a university laboratory in 1930 and moved in 1937 to larger premises in the engineering faculty's Technicum building that he helped design.

The laboratory was central to Magnel's engineering method. He preferred full-scale tests to small models and used testing work for contractors, companies, and public authorities to fund equipment and staff. By the eve of the Second World War, it had become one of Europe's best-known laboratories for reinforced-concrete testing. After the war, its facilities kept expanding with the introduction in 1950 of equipment for static and dynamic mechanical tests on structural elements up to 20 m long.

== Teaching and engineering approach ==
Magnel first became known as a teacher and writer on reinforced concrete. His work is frequently cited as instrumental in bridging theoretical developments and practical engineering applications. His four-volume La pratique du calcul du béton armé (lit. 'The Practice of Reinforced Concrete Design') presented rapid design methods for ordinary engineering problems and was repeatedly revised. His teaching emphasized practical calculation, physical understanding, and simple formulas rather than elaborate mathematical derivations.

Magnel's work belonged to a Belgian construction ecosystem in which concrete contractors, academic laboratories, specialist journals, and engineering associations played an unusually visible role in the international history of concrete. It also formed part of a wider Belgian tradition in which structural mechanics, architectural construction, and empirical practice were closely connected rather than treated as separate intellectual domains.

In 1923, when Belgium issued its first design guidelines for reinforced-concrete structures, Magnel was one of the principal contributors. His writings covered reinforced concrete, arches, Vierendeel beams, structural stability, material testing, concrete cracking, and later prestressed concrete. Riessauw's 1960 memorial bibliography lists books and a long sequence of papers from 1910 to 1955.

Magnel's engineering approach combined calculation, full-scale testing, and pedagogy. He distrusted unnecessarily complex formulae and argued for practical methods that engineers could use rapidly while still understanding the physical behaviour of a structure. His books used tables, graphs, and worked examples, and his laboratory sought to validate design assumptions through full-scale beams rather than small models.

His work on prestressed concrete included methods for statically determinate beams, continuous beams, end-block design, creep and shrinkage, fatigue, external tendons, and permissible stresses. Dinges's later history of prestressed concrete emphasizes Magnel's ability to communicate prestressing to practising designers, while Billington similarly identifies him as the great teacher among the early prestressing pioneers.

Magnel was especially influential because he could present his ideas in French, Dutch, and English. His English-language book Prestressed Concrete became one of the early channels by which European prestressing practice reached engineers in Britain, North America, and other English-speaking countries.

== SECO and professional control ==
Magnel was concerned not only with calculation and research but also with professional control and safety in construction. In 1934 he helped establish with Eugène François of the Université libre de Bruxelles the Belgian technical-control organization SECURITAS later known as SECO after two bridges had collapsed on the Albert Canal. The organization was intended to provide independent technical checking for the construction industry, particularly as new structural materials and methods increased the need for reliable control. Magnel's support for such a body reflected his view that innovation in reinforced and prestressed concrete required experimental confidence, design standards, and systematic checking.

== Prestressed concrete ==
=== Background ===
Prestressed concrete had been investigated before Magnel's work, but it became practical only after Freyssinet demonstrated the need for high-strength steel and the importance of losses caused by creep, shrinkage, and relaxation. Magnel followed these developments closely. By the late 1930s he had begun testing prestressed beams at Ghent and had started to consider both pretensioning and post-tensioning methods.

During the Second World War, the German occupation authorities banned Magnel from teaching, but he remained director of the laboratory. Magnel sought to protect his engineering students from forced labour in Germany by persuading the German occupation authorities to keep them in Belgium working on developments in prestressed concrete, given their interest in pretensioned concrete for military construction, notably for the construction of submarine pens. The isolation of the war years gave him the opportunity to carry out full-scale tests on prestressed concrete girders and to study creep in high-strength steel wires, shrinkage and creep in concrete, friction losses, fatigue, buckling, and the behaviour of statically indeterminate prestressed beams. Suspicion of Magnel grew and in 1944 the Gestapo ordered his arrest. He went into hiding in Brussels and remained a fugitive until the liberation of Belgium.

After Allied forces advanced, Magnel resumed his position at Ghent University. He assisted the Canadian Army by rapidly constructing a bridge over the Terneuzen Canal to support fuel pipelines, using prefabricated concrete elements that had originally been produced under German orders but deliberately withheld.

=== Blaton–Magnel system ===
Because use of the French Freyssinet system was impossible in wartime Belgium, Magnel and the Brussels contractor Blaton-Aubert developed a Belgian post-tensioning system. It became known as the Sandwich system, Belgian system or Blaton–Magnel system. The multi-parallel wedge anchorage system uses bundles of 5–7 mm high-strength steel wires, called tendons, enclosed in corrosion-resistant metal sleeves. The wires are arranged and maintained in position by spacers and anchored using grooved wedge-shaped sandwich plates, each accommodating eight wires. Cables are therefore formed in multiples of eight wires, with configurations ranging up to 64 wires. Tensioning is carried out using a specially designed jack that pulls two wires simultaneously, enabling efficient stressing with relatively small equipment. This procedure ensures a comparatively uniform stress distribution across the cable system while maintaining controlled spacing of the wires along their length.

Older accounts often presented the system chiefly as Magnel's invention. Later research in the Blaton archives has modified that view. The Blaton-Aubert company, founded in 1865 and by the 1940s a major Belgian concrete contractor, possessed an engineering office and industrial capacity that were essential to the early applications of the system. Blaton-Aubert played a substantial role in the industrial development, design detailing, and promotion of the system, and that the early Belgian prestressing story involved Magnel, the Blaton-Aubert company, the brothers Armand et Emile Blaton and Freyssinet's Belgian patent representative. The system is therefore better understood as a technical and institutional collaboration initiated in 1941 than as the product of a single inventor.

Magnel is generally regarded as one of the pioneers of prestressed concrete, not only in Belgium, but also in other countries, especially in Britain and North America. He became director of Stressed Concrete Design Ltd. in London and of Precompressed Concrete Engineering Co. Ltd. in Montreal (Canada).

=== Early applications in Belgium ===
The earliest Belgian applications of prestressed concrete were industrial structures built during the war. Warehouses for the building material trader Victor Trief in 1942 and cement silos at the Alexandre Dapsens cement plant in 1943 were the first Belgian prestressed concrete structures, preceding the better-known Magnel's bridges and footbridges. A railway bridge at Rue du Miroir in Brussels, built in 1944, was one of the first prestressed concrete railway applications in Europe and included a full-scale test on a 20 m beam.

After the war, the system was applied to larger works. The roof of the Union Cotonnière factory in Ghent, built in 1947–1948, covered about 35,000 m² and used large numbers of precast prestressed beams. Other projects included aircraft-hangar beams at Melsbroek, then the Brussels airport site, and several bridge structures built during Belgium's reconstruction after the First World War.

=== Sclayn Bridge ===
The Sclayn Bridge over the Meuse, constructed in 1949–1950 near Sclayn and Andenne, became one of the most important demonstrations of prestressed concrete in Europe. It is a two-span continuous prestressed concrete girder bridge with spans of 62.70 m. Until the 1950s arch bridges were predominant for spans exceeding 30 to 40 m. This bridge is often described as the first continuous prestressed concrete bridge.

Magnel was not the only designer involved. The bridge was submitted by Blaton-Aubert, and later accounts identify Alexandre Birguer as designer, with Magnel acting as consultant and providing the prestressing system and calculation methods. The bridge therefore illustrates both Magnel's technical influence and the collaborative nature of early prestressed concrete. It also functioned as a monitored structure: Magnel planned for the behaviour of the bridge to be observed in service so that engineers could compare measured prestress losses and stresses with calculated predictions.

=== Walnut Lane Memorial Bridge ===
Magnel first visited the United States in 1946 as a fellow of the Belgian American Educational Foundation and as a member of a Belgian scientific mission. During that visit he lectured on prestressed concrete, then little known among American structural engineers. Charles C. Zollman, a former student of Magnel and later an engineer at Preload Corporation, helped arrange the visit and translated Magnel's French manuscript on prestressed concrete into English.

The Walnut Lane Memorial Bridge in Philadelphia was built between 1949 and 1951 and became the first major prestressed concrete bridge in the United States. The project used precast, post-tensioned concrete girders. Magnel insisted on dry, high-quality concrete and careful vibration, a requirement that led to disagreement with American contractors accustomed to wetter mixes. The successful testing of a full-size girder helped persuade engineers of the safety and economy of prestressed concrete.

With its 50 m (160 ft) spans, the bridge had influence beyond its immediate structure. The test demonstration drew engineers from many American states and several countries, and the project became an important reference point for the American prestressed-concrete industry. Although the original superstructure was later replaced, the bridge played an instrumental role in introducing prestressed concrete to American bridge engineering, increasing Magnel's international influence.

== Public and professional life ==
Magnel was active in professional organizations in Belgium and abroad. He was elected corresponding member of the Royal Academy of Science, Letters and Fine Arts of Belgium in 1945 and full member in 1946. He was also associated with the American Concrete Institute, the American Society of Civil Engineers, the Institution of Structural Engineers, Belgian engineering organizations and international bodies concerned with concrete and construction. In the early 1950s he helped organize Belgian and international prestressing bodies. He became first vice-president of the Fédération Internationale de la Précontrainte (FIP), with Freyssinet as its first president. He represented his country at UNESCO from 1945 to 1946.

Magnel also participated in civic and public life in Ghent. He became president of the Ghent Rotary Club and was involved in the association formed to protect Saint Nicholas' Church, Ghent. His post-war political engagement includes an unsuccessful parliamentary candidacy in 1954.

== Later years and death ==
In his last years Magnel worked on a proposal for a telecommunications tower for Expo 58, the 1958 World's Fair in Brussels. The project envisaged a concrete tower about 500 m high with a steel mast of about 135 m above it. The proposal became controversial on technical, political, and aesthetic grounds. After Magnel's sudden death, the project was abandoned, and the Atomium became the principal symbol of Expo 58.

Magnel died suddenly in Ghent on 5 July 1955. A memorial academic session was held at Ghent University in October 1956.

== Legacy ==
Magnel's legacy rests on three related activities: laboratory research, teaching, and the international dissemination of prestressed concrete. The Ghent laboratory he founded became the Magnel Laboratory for Concrete Research and later part of the Magnel-Vandepitte laboratories for structural engineering and building materials. His students and visitors included engineers who later became important in the development of prestressed concrete, including T. Y. Lin and David P. Billington.

His 1948 textbook on prestressed concrete, published in French and English and later translated or adapted into other languages, was among the earliest comprehensive design texts on the subject. It helped transmit European prestressing practice to engineers in Britain, North America, and elsewhere.

Since 1959, the Association of Engineers of Ghent University has awarded the Gustave Magnel Gold Medal every five years to the designer or design office of a completed structure regarded as an important or remarkable application of reinforced or prestressed concrete. Recipients have included engineers and designers associated with major concrete structures, including Nicolas Esquillan, Fritz Leonhardt, Ulrich Finsterwalder, Michel Virlogeux, Jörg Schlaich, William F. Baker, Laurent Ney, and Liu Zhenyu.

== Selected engineering works ==
The following works are among the structures most often associated with Magnel and the Blaton–Magnel system in the literature. They include projects in which he acted as designer, consultant, structural calculator, laboratory investigator, or developer of the prestressing method, rather than necessarily as sole designer or contractor.

- Boekentoren, Ghent University Library, Ghent: Magnel contributed to structural calculations for the library tower designed by Henry van de Velde.
- Technicum and university hospital buildings, Ghent University (1937): Magnel contributed to reinforced-concrete calculations for major university works.
- 17-metre-high cement silos at the Alexandre Dapsens cement plant in Tournai, connected by a footbridge (1943).
- Early prestressed-concrete railway bridge (20 m span), crossing Rue du Miroir on the Brussels North–South railway connection (1944): applications.
- Early prestressed-concrete footbridge (21 m span) built across the canal in Brussels, at the level of the Rue de Gosselies, in Autumn 1944 and demolished in 2018
- The roof of the Union Cotonnière (UCO) textile mills in Ghent (1948), which covered nearly 30 000 m² of work space using a grid of precast prestressed-concrete beams built by Blaton-Aubert. It was demolished in the 2010s.
- Prestressed-concrete beams for Melsbroek airport hangar beams (c. 1948), today's Brussels airport site.
- Sclayn Bridge over the Meuse, near Namur (1949), the first continuous prestressed-concrete bridges.
- Walnut Lane Memorial Bridge, Philadelphia (1951), the first major prestressed-concrete bridge in the United States.
Selected engineering works associated with Magnel

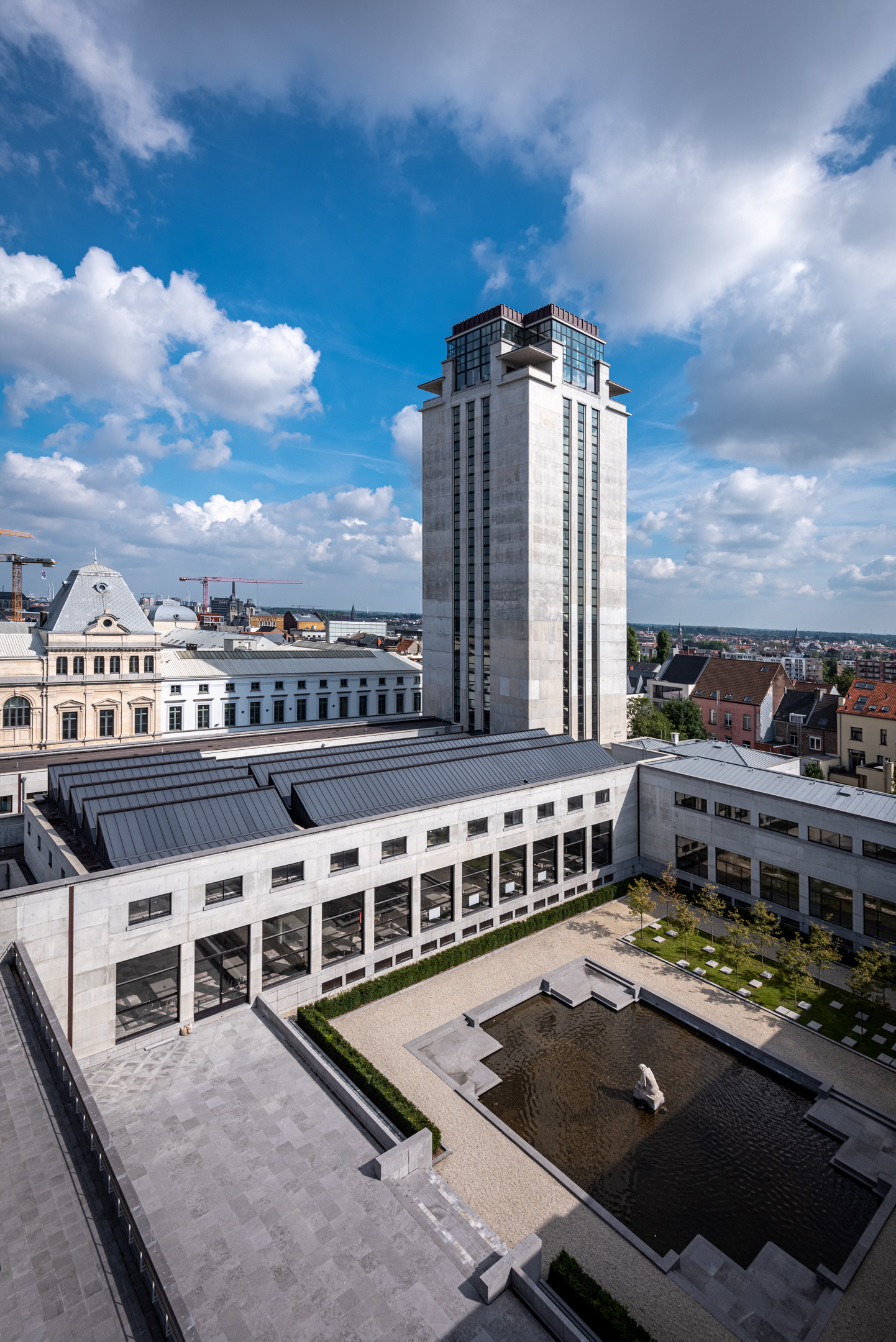
Boekentoren, the library tower of Ghent University

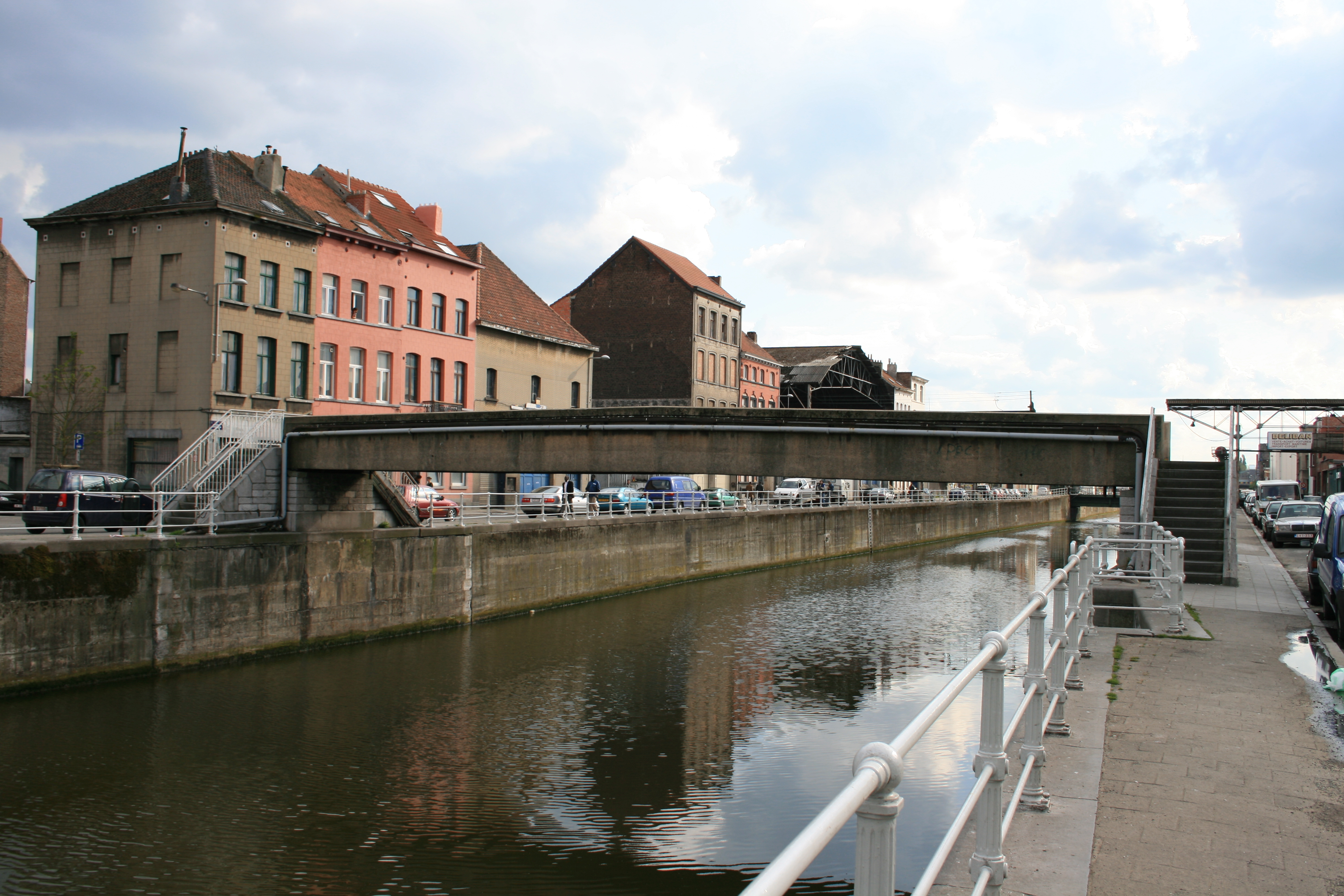
Footbridge built in Brussels in 1944 (demolished in 2019)

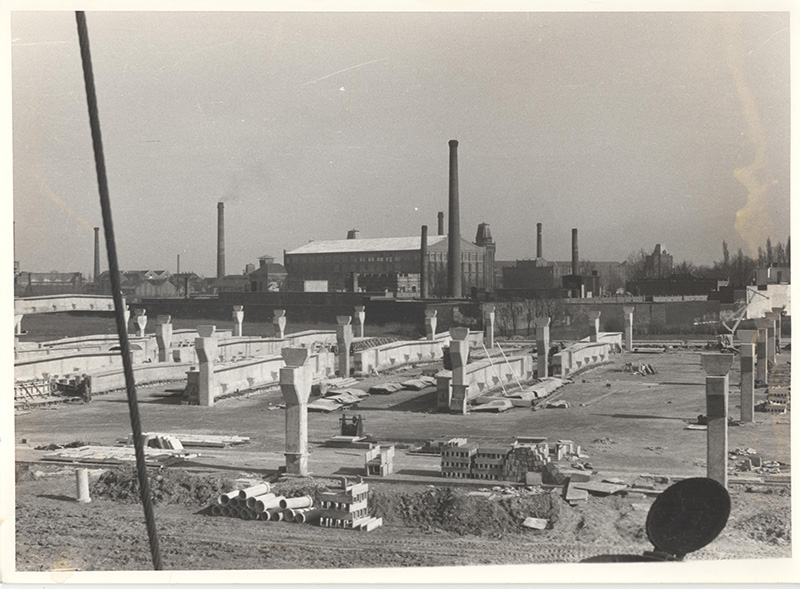
Prestressed beams visible during the construction of the UCO textile factory in 1948

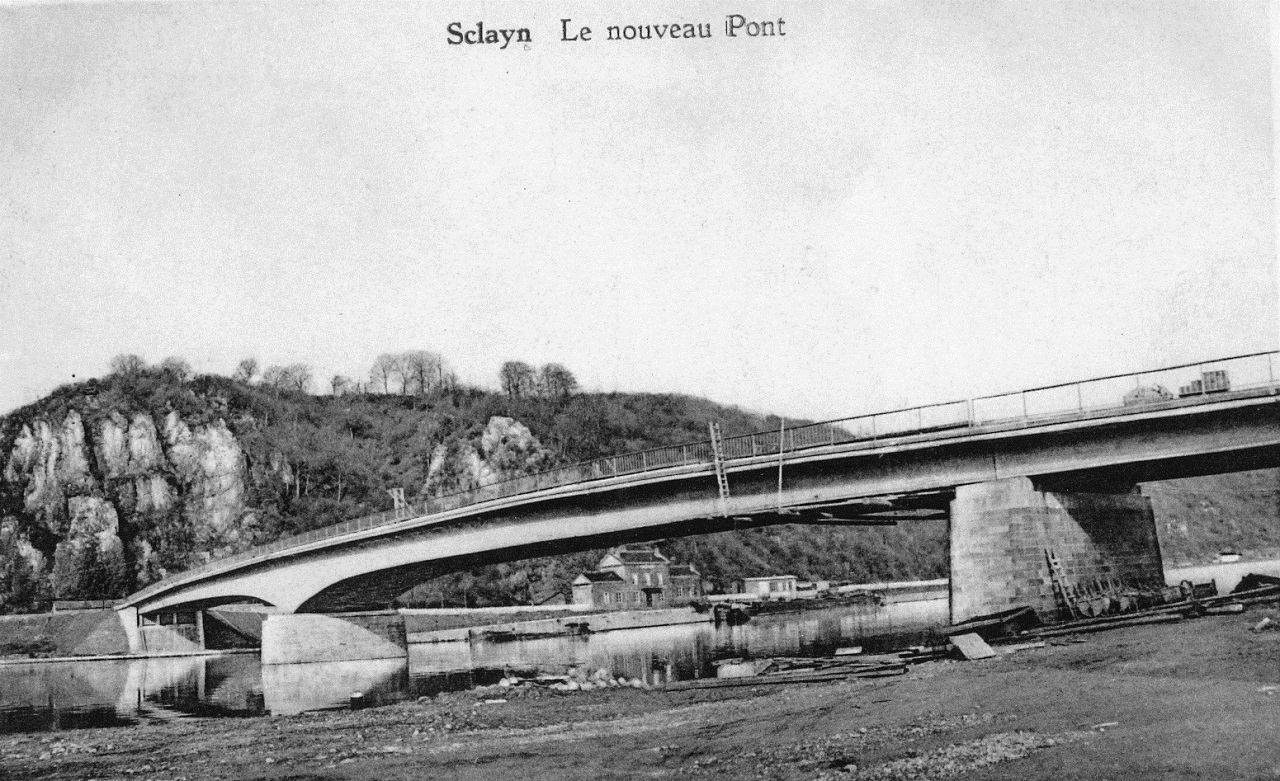
The bridge at Sclayn over the Meuse built in 1949

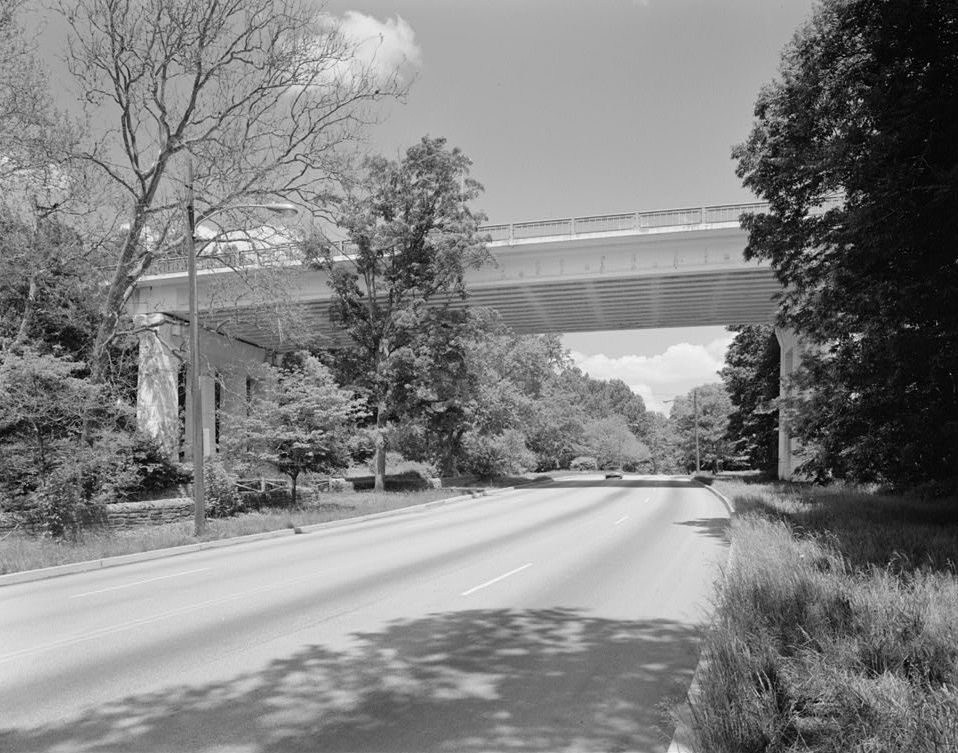
Walnut Lane Memorial Bridge built in 1951

== Selected publications ==
- Magnel, Gustave (1923–1953). La pratique du calcul du béton armé (in French). Vol. 1–4. Ghent: Van Rysselberghe & Rombaut / Fecheyr. OL 17084796M.
- Magnel, Gustave (1930). Calcul des arcs (in French). Ghent: Van Rysselberghe & Rombaut.
- Magnel, Gustave (1933). Calcul pratique de la poutre Vierendeel (in French). Ghent: Fecheyr.
- Magnel, Gustave (1947). "The principles of prestressed concrete". Journal of the Engineering Institute of Canada. 30: 110–112.
- Magnel, Gustave (1948). Cours de stabilité des constructions (in French). Vol. 1–4. Ghent: Fecheyr.
- Magnel, Gustave (1948). Le béton précontraint. La pratique du calcul du béton armé (in French). Vol. 4. Ghent: Fecheyr.
- Magnel, Gustave (1948). Prestressed Concrete (1st ed.). London: Concrete Publications.
- Magnel, Gustave (1950). Hormigón precomprimido (in Spanish). Buenos Aires.
- Magnel, Gustave (1948). "Creep of Steel and Concrete in Relation to Prestressed Concrete". Journal of the American Concrete Institute. 44 (6): 485–500. doi:10.14359/12188.
- Magnel, Gustave (1950). "Prototype Prestressed Beam Justifies Walnut Lane Bridge Design". Journal Proceedings. 47 (12). American Concrete Institute: 301–316. doi:10.14359/11993.
- Magnel, Gustave (1954). Prestressed Concrete (3rd ed.). London: Concrete Publications. p. 345. OL 16776550M.
- Magnel, Gustave (1956). Theorie und Praxis des Spannbetons: Berechnung, konstruktive Gestaltung und durchgerechnete Beispiele von Spannbetonbauten (in German). Translated by Schröder, H. Wiesbaden/Berlin: Bauverlag.

== Honours and awards ==
Magnel received the Frank P. Brown Medal of the Franklin Institute in 1950 for his contributions to prestressed concrete. He was also awarded honours including Grand Officer de l'Ordre de Leopold II, Commander of the Order of St. Sava, and Chevalier de la Légion d'honneur. He was a member of the Royal Academy of Belgium and of several Belgian and international engineering organizations.

== Bibliography ==
- Ager, J. W. A. (8–13 September 1951). "Some applications of the Magnel-Blaton system of prestressed concrete in the United Kingdom". Congrès international du béton précontraint (comptes-rendus) [International congress of prestressed concrete (proceedings)]. Ghent: Association des ingénieurs sortis des écoles spéciales de Gand (AIG). p. 277. OCLC 901881027.
- AIG (2023). "Gouden Medaille Gustave Magnel" (PDF) (in Dutch). Association des ingénieurs diplômés de l'Université de Gand.
- Archives régionales de Wallonie. "Construction du pont actuel de Sclayn". archives.wallonie.be (in French).
- Archives régionales de Wallonie. "Mesures sur le pont actuel de Sclayn". archives.wallonie.be (in French).
- Benvenuto, Edoardo (1995). "Entre mécanique et architecture". In Radelet-de Grave, Patricia; Benvenuto, Edoardo (eds.). Entre Mécanique et Architecture / Between Mechanics and Architecture. Basel: Birkhäuser. pp. 7–18. doi:10.1007/978-3-0348-9072-4. ISBN 978-3-0348-9894-2.
- Billington, David P. (2000). "Transferring Technology From Europe To America: Cases in Concrete – Thin Shells and Prestressing". Sartoniana. 13 95355: 47–72. doi:10.21825/sartoniana.95355.
- Billington, David P. (January–February 2004). "Historical Perspective on Prestressed Concrete" (PDF). PCI Journal: 48–71.
- Botte, Wouter; Vereecken, Eline; Taerwe, Luc; Caspeele, Robby (2021). "Assessment of posttensioned concrete beams from the 1940s: Large-scale load testing, numerical analysis and Bayesian assessment of prestressing losses". Structural Concrete. 22 (3): 1500–1522. doi:10.1002/suco.202000774. ISSN 1464-4177.
- Campbell, Betty (13 August 1955). "Prof. Gustave Magnel". Nature. 176 (4476): 284–285. Bibcode:1955Natur.176..284C. doi:10.1038/176284a0.
- Campus, Ferdinand (1970). "Notice sur Gustave Magnel" (PDF). Annuaire de l'Académie royale des sciences, des lettres et des beaux-arts de Belgique (in French). Brussels: Académie royale de Belgique. pp. 1–39.
- CIT Blaton. "Our history". citblaton.be.
- Dinges, Tyson (2009). The History of Prestressed Concrete: 1888 to 1963 (Master's report). Kansas State University. hdl:2097/1439.
- Espion, Bernard (2012). "Voorspannen van beton en voorbuigen van staal: twee manieren om het gebruik van deze materialen in het midden van de 20ste eeuw te optimaliseren". Engineering erfgoed : 150 jaar structuurinnovatie in Brussel (PDF). Ruimtelijke ordening aan de orde. Akten van colloquia (in Dutch). pp. 25–30.
- Espion, Bernard (2015). The Founding Events of Prestressed Concrete in Belgium Seen Through the Blaton Archives (PDF). Proceedings of the Fifth International Congress on Construction History. Chicago: Construction History Society of America. pp. 41–48.
- Espion, Bernard (2019). "België's internationale faam in de geschiedenis van het beton: Blaton, Christophe, Hennebique, Magnel en de anderen" [Belgium’s world-renowned contribution to the history of concrete Blaton, Christophe, Franki, Hennebique, Magnel and others…]. Erfgoed Brussel (in Dutch). Vol. 30. Urban.Brussels. pp. 14–27. ISBN 978-2-87584-180-3.
- Espion, Bernard; Provost, Michel (2019). "Onderzoek ter gelegenheid van de sloop van een voetgangersbrug in voorgespannen beton" [Construction engineering heritage 1944–2018 An investigation of a prestressed concrete footbridge prior to demolition]. Erfgoed Brussel (in Dutch). Vol. 30. Urban.Brussels. pp. 14–27. ISBN 978-2-87584-180-3.
- Espion, Bernard (2023). "Belgium's International Reputation in the History of Concrete: Blaton, Christophe, Franki, Hennebique, Magnel and Others". Changing Cultures: European Perspectives on the History of Concrete. CRC Press. pp. 161–179. doi:10.1201/9781003368656-8.
- Espion, Bernard; Devos, Rika; Provost, Michel (2023). "The Belgian Company Blaton: From the Trade of Cement to the International Promotion of Prestressed Concrete, 1865–1954". Changing Cultures: European Perspectives on the History of Concrete. CRC Press. pp. 237–260. doi:10.1201/9781003368656-12.
- ETWIE (31 March 2021). "Academisch erfgoed in beeld: Laboratorium Magnel". etwie.be (in Dutch). Archived from the original on 26 September 2023.
- Flanders Heritage Agency (20 June 2023). "Technische laboratoria en thermische centrale van de Universiteit Gent". Inventaris Onroerend Erfgoed (in Dutch).
- Flanders Heritage Agency (20 June 2023). "Flandria Palace Hotel". Inventaris Onroerend Erfgoed (in Dutch).
- GBB-BBG (2024). "Gustave Magnel 14th Gold Medal" (PDF). www.gbb-bbg.be.
- Ghent University. "History: Department of Structural Engineering and Building Materials". Ghent University.
- Grace's Guide. "D. G. Somerville and Co". Grace's Guide.
- IABSE Belgium. "Belgian Group of IABSE". International Association for Bridge and Structural Engineering.
- IndustrieMuseum. "Buitenzicht van textielfabriek Cotonnière Braun in Gent (1960)". IndustrieMuseum (in Dutch).
- Magnel, Gustave (1950). "Longest Continuous Prestressed Girders Carry Sclayn Bridge Traffic over Meuse". Civil Engineering. 20 (7).
- Magnel, Gustave (1950). "Prototype Prestressed Beam Justifies Walnut Lane Bridge Design". ACI Journal Proceedings. 47 (12): 301–316. doi:10.14359/11993. ISSN 0002-8061.
- Palindroom. "Experimentele destructie van de eerste Belgische voetgangersbrug in voorgespannen beton". www.architectura.be (in Dutch).
- Radelet-de Grave, Patricia (2025). "Gustave Magnel (1889–1955): A Life in Structural Engineering". Between Mechanics and Architecture: Mathematics and the Built Environment. Vol. 8. Cham: Birkhäuser. pp. 531–563. doi:10.1007/978-3-031-73530-1_21. ISBN 978-3-031-73529-5.
- Rammer, Yves; Espion, Bernard (2014). "A case study of replacement of external post-tensioning cables". Proceedings of the Institution of Civil Engineers – Bridge Engineering. 167 (3): 183–192. doi:10.1680/bren.13.00019. ISSN 1478-4637.
- Riessauw, Felix G. (1960). "Gustaaf Magnel (1889–1955)". In Luykx, Theo (ed.). Liber Memorialis 1913–1960. Deel IV: Faculteit der Wetenschappen en Faculteit der Toegepaste Wetenschappen (PDF) (in Dutch). Ghent: Rectoraat Rijksuniversiteit Gent. pp. 364–371.
- SECO Belgium. "About SECO". Group SECO.
- SECO Group. "About us". SECO Group.
- Structurae. "Sclayn Bridge (Sclayn/Vezin, 1950)". Structurae.
- Structurae. "Rue de Gosselies Footbridge (Sint-Jans-Molenbeek, 1944)". Structurae.
- Taerwe, Luc R. (2005). Contributions of Gustave Magnel to the Development of Prestressed Concrete (PDF). Ned H. Burns Symposium on Historic Innovations in Prestressed Concrete. ACI SP-231. American Concrete Institute. pp. 1–14.
- Taerwe, Luc R. (2025). "Gustave Magnel: A Global Pioneer and Innovator in Prestressed Concrete". Prestress Technology. 3 (2): 69–79. doi:10.59238/j.pt.2025.02.006.
- UGentMemorialis. "Magnel, Gustaaf 1889–1955". Ghent University.
- Vandenbroucke, M. (2015). "De Hoogste toren van de wereld: Technologische ambitie of grootheidswaanzin? Uit het archief van Edward Anseele jr". Brood & Rozen (in Dutch). 19 (4). doi:10.21825/br.v19i4.8520.
- Vanacker, Bart (22 December 2022). "Cimenteries Alexandre Dapsens – Oudste getuige van voorgespannen beton". www.industriecultuur.be (in Dutch).
- Van de Voorde, Stephanie (2016). "Magnel, Gustave (1889–1955)". UGentMemorie.
- Van de Voorde, Stephanie; De Meyer, Ronald; Taerwe, Luc (2008). "Gustave Magnel: Pionier van het voorgespannen beton". Cement (in Dutch) (5): 12–17.
- Van de Vijver, Dirk (2003). From Nieuport to Magnel: an istitutional history of building science in Belgium (1780–1930) (PDF). Proceedings of the First International Congress on Construction History. Madrid.
- Vignolet, Henry (27 February 1955). "Exposition de l'Ere atomique, installée sur un plateau de vingt hectares, recevra 30 millions de visiteurs". France-soir (in French): 4.
- Zollman, Charles C. (May–June 1978). "Magnel's Impact on the Advent of Prestressed Concrete" (PDF). PCI Journal. 23 (3): 22–48. doi:10.15554/pcij.05011978.21.48.
- Zollman, Charles C. (1981). "Magnel's Impact on the Advent of Prestressed Concrete". Reflections on the Beginnings of Prestressed Concrete in America (PDF). Chicago: Prestressed Concrete Institute. pp. 5–32. ISBN 978-0-937040-18-8. Archived from the original (PDF) on 20 May 2025.
