= Zolman =

Zolman is a surname, an Americanized form of Zollmann. Notable people with the surname include:

- Greg Zolman (born 1978), American football player
- Shanna Zolman (born 1983), American basketball player
