= Maison du Peuple, Brussels =

Demolished public building in Brussels, Belgium

Maison du Peuple (French); Volkshuis (Dutch)
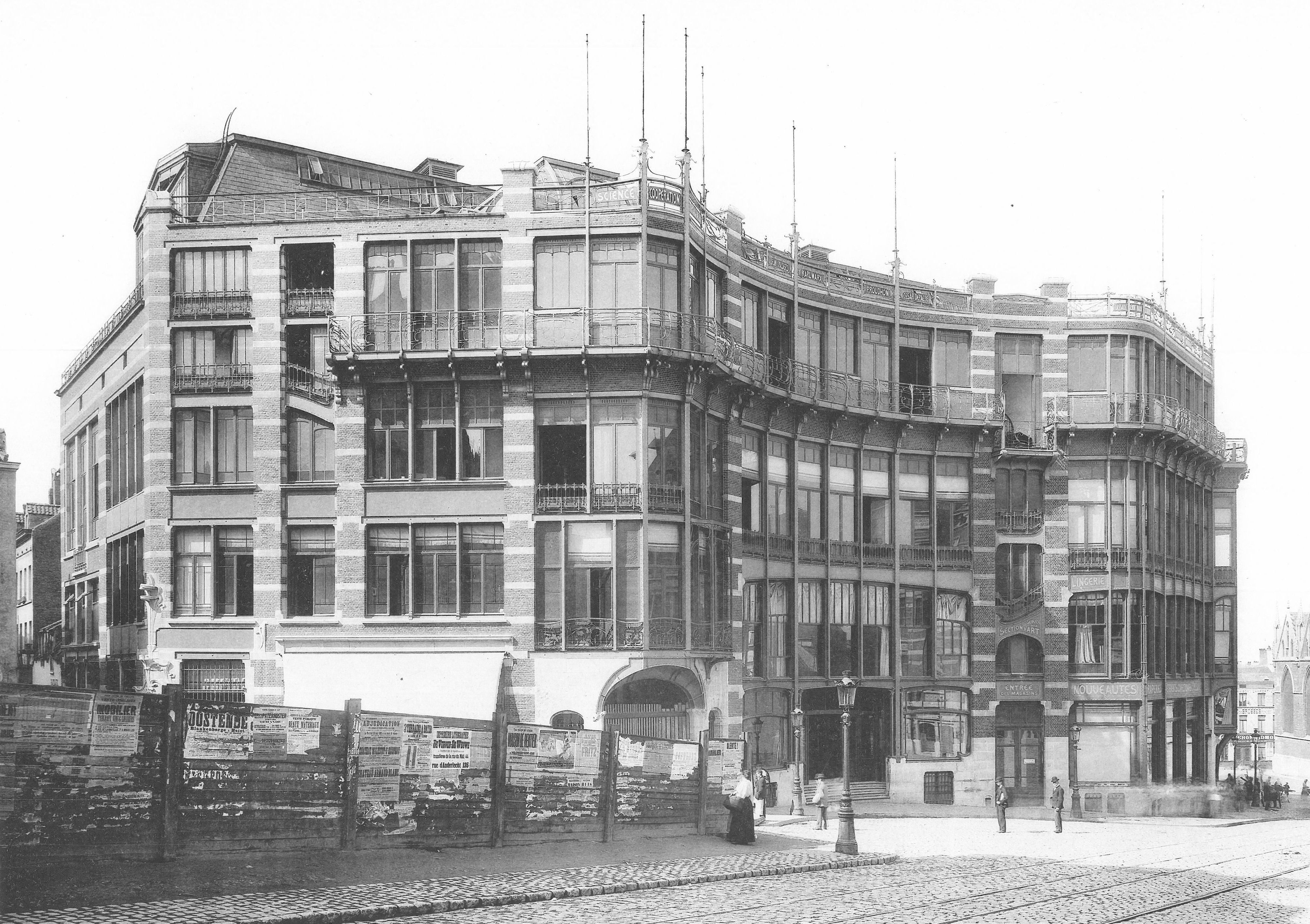
- View of the Maison du Peuple/Volkshuis in the late 19th century or early 20th century
- Interactive map of the: Maison du Peuple (French); Volkshuis (Dutch); area

General information
- Status: Demolished
- Type: Political headquarters premises
- Architectural style: Art Nouveau
- Location: Place Emile Vandervelde / Emile Vanderveldeplein, 1000 City of Brussels, Brussels-Capital Region, Belgium
- Coordinates: 50°50′28″N 4°21′9″E
- Named for: Workers (Belgian Workers' Party)
- Construction started: 1896
- Completed: 1899
- Demolished: 1965

Technical details
- Material: White cast iron

Design and construction
- Architect: Victor Horta

The Maison du Peuple (French, pronounced [mɛzɔ̃ dy pœpl]) or Volkshuis (Dutch, pronounced [ˈvɔlksˌɦœys]), both literally the "House of the People", was a public building located on the Place Emile Vandervelde/Emile Vanderveldeplein, in the Sablon/Zavel district of Brussels, Belgium. It was one of the most influential Art Nouveau buildings in Belgium and one of the most notable designs by the architect Victor Horta. Commissioned by the Belgian Workers' Party (POB/BWP), it was constructed between 1896 and 1899, and opened on 2 April 1899.

The Maison du Peuple was demolished in 1965, and a high-rise office building, the Blaton Tower, was built on its site. Its demolition has been regarded as an "architectural crime" and an example of Brusselisation.

== Building ==
Victor Horta was commissioned by the Belgian Workers' Party (POB/BWP) to build a grandiose people's house on the Place Emile Vandervelde/Emile Vanderveldeplein, in the Sablon/Zavel district of Brussels. He was assisted in this project by Richard Pringiers, who was to become the party's appointed architect.

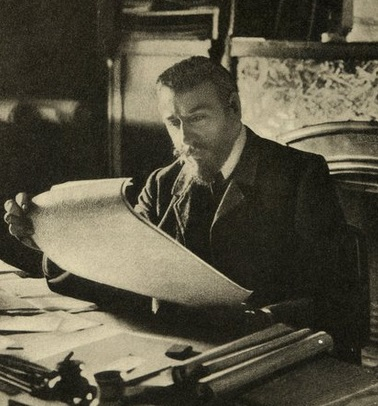
The Maison du Peuple's architect, Victor Horta

In spite of a rather restrictive and irregular plot, along a circular square and on a slope, Horta succeeded in constructing a four-storey building with maximum functionality. It provided space for all kinds of socio-economic facilities: the ground floor was made of shops and a café restaurant; the first floor included the party's offices and meeting rooms, as well as a library; the second and third floors welcomed various multi-purpose rooms; the fourth floor was home to a large auditorium and concert hall seating over 2,000 people.

Unlike Horta's houses, the decoration was kept to a minimum, as it was a purely functional building, mainly constructed in white cast iron (more than 600,000 kg [1,300,000 lb]) with curtain walls. Fifteen craftsmen worked for eighteen months on the ironwork. The only strikingly recognisable Art Nouveau features of the façade were the balustrades with curling lines, as well as a slight curving of the steel pillars supporting the roof. On the roof, the building was decorated with signs bearing the names of people who contributed to the socialist cause, such as Karl Marx and Leon Blum. As with Horta's houses, however, the building was designed to make maximum use of light, with large skylights over the main meeting room. To make this construction possible, Horta drew no less than 8,500 m^{2} (91,000 sq ft) of plans.

The building was completed in 1899 and was inaugurated in the presence of the French socialist leader Jean Jaurès. Because of the experimental combination of brick, glass and steel, it was considered as a masterwork of modern architecture.

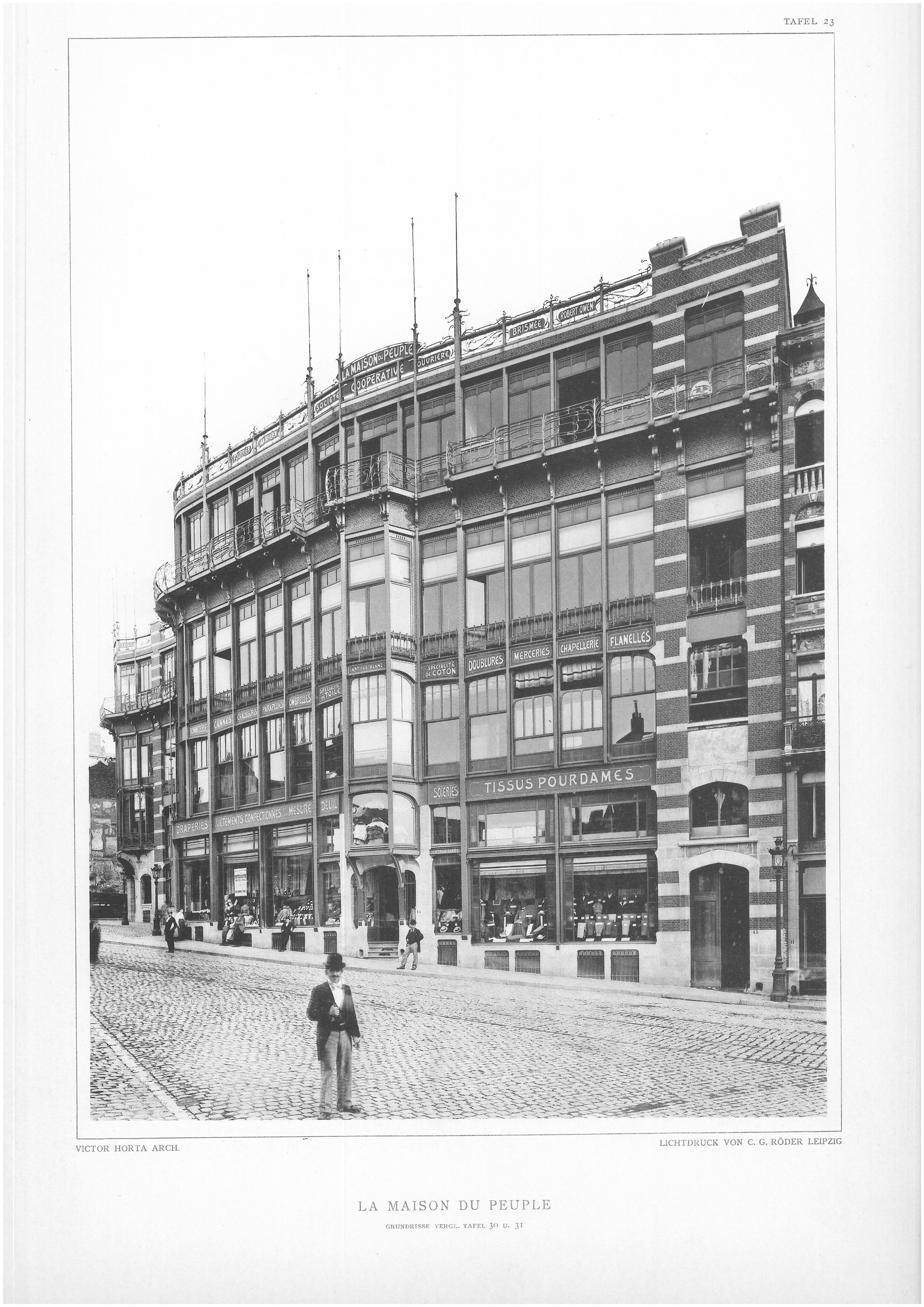
View from the exterior

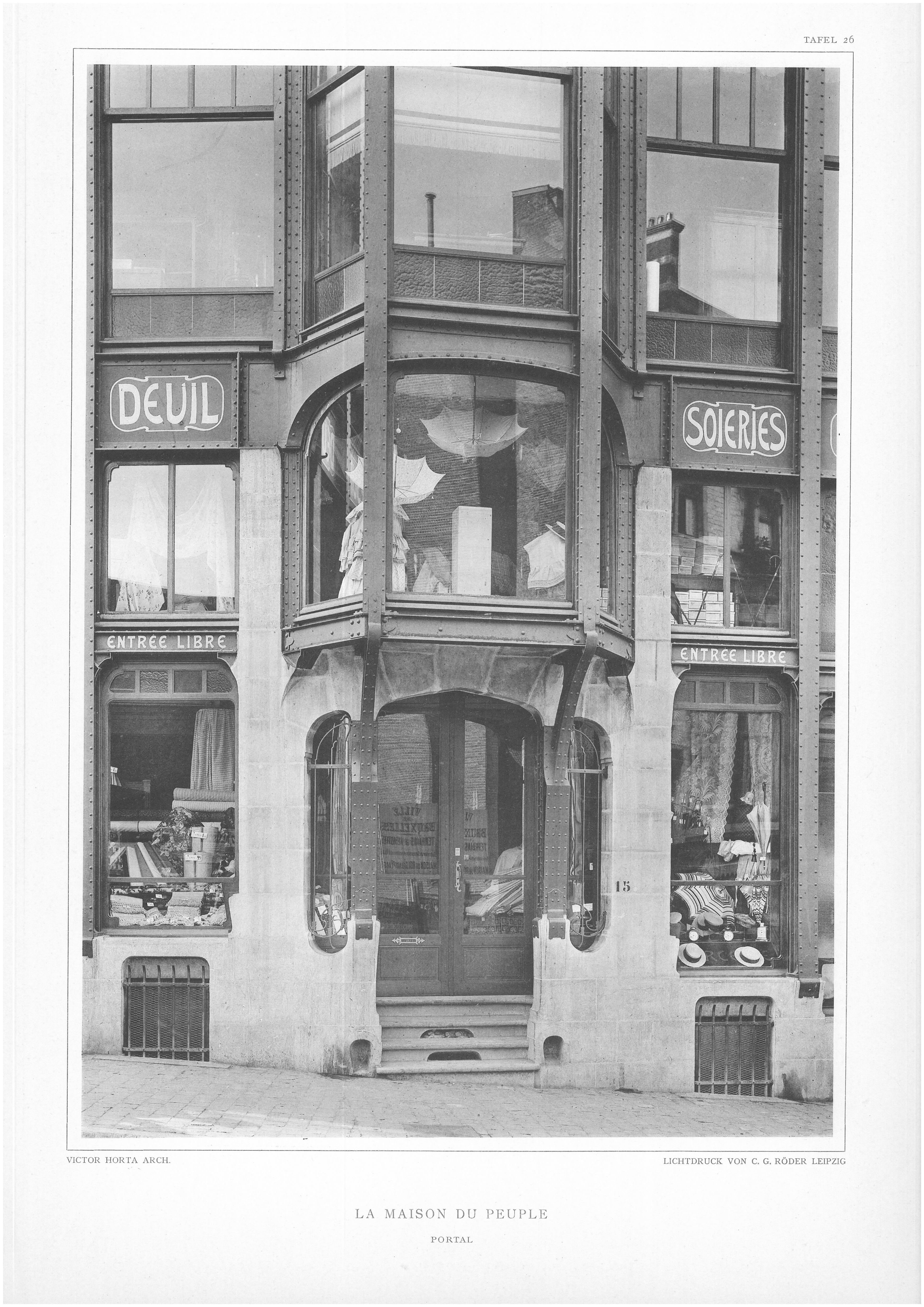
Entrance

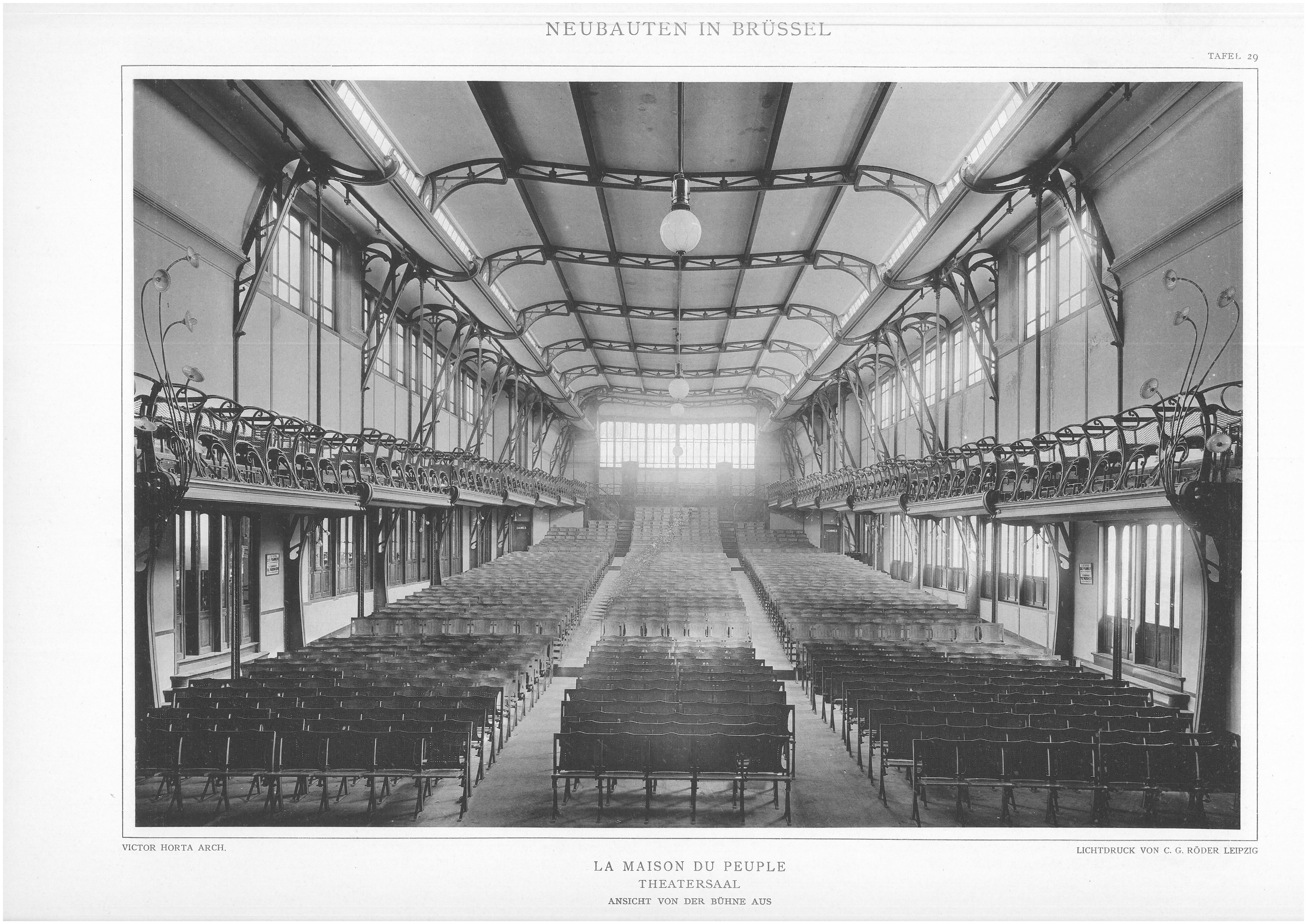
Theatre and Meeting Hall

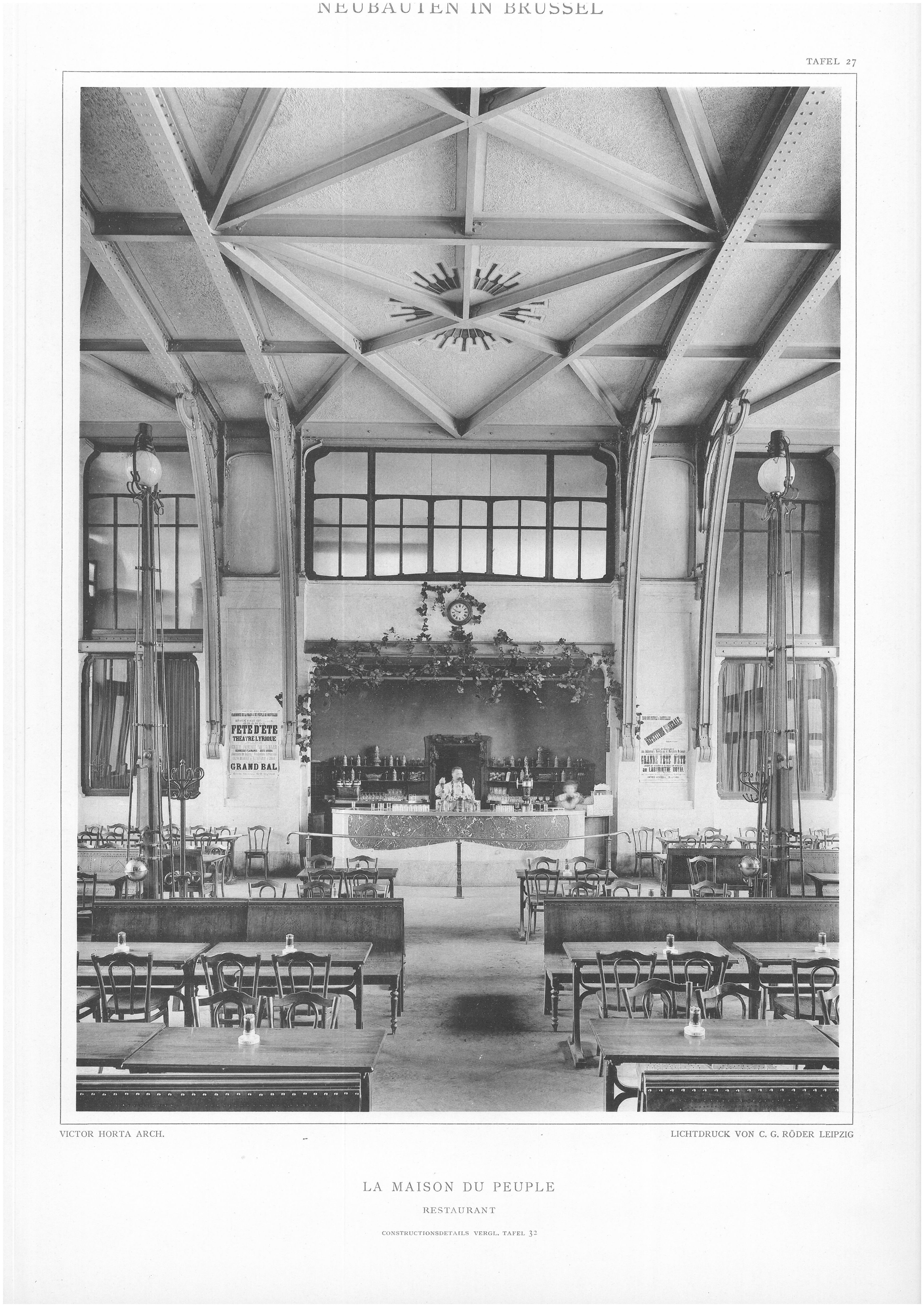
Restaurant

== Demolition ==
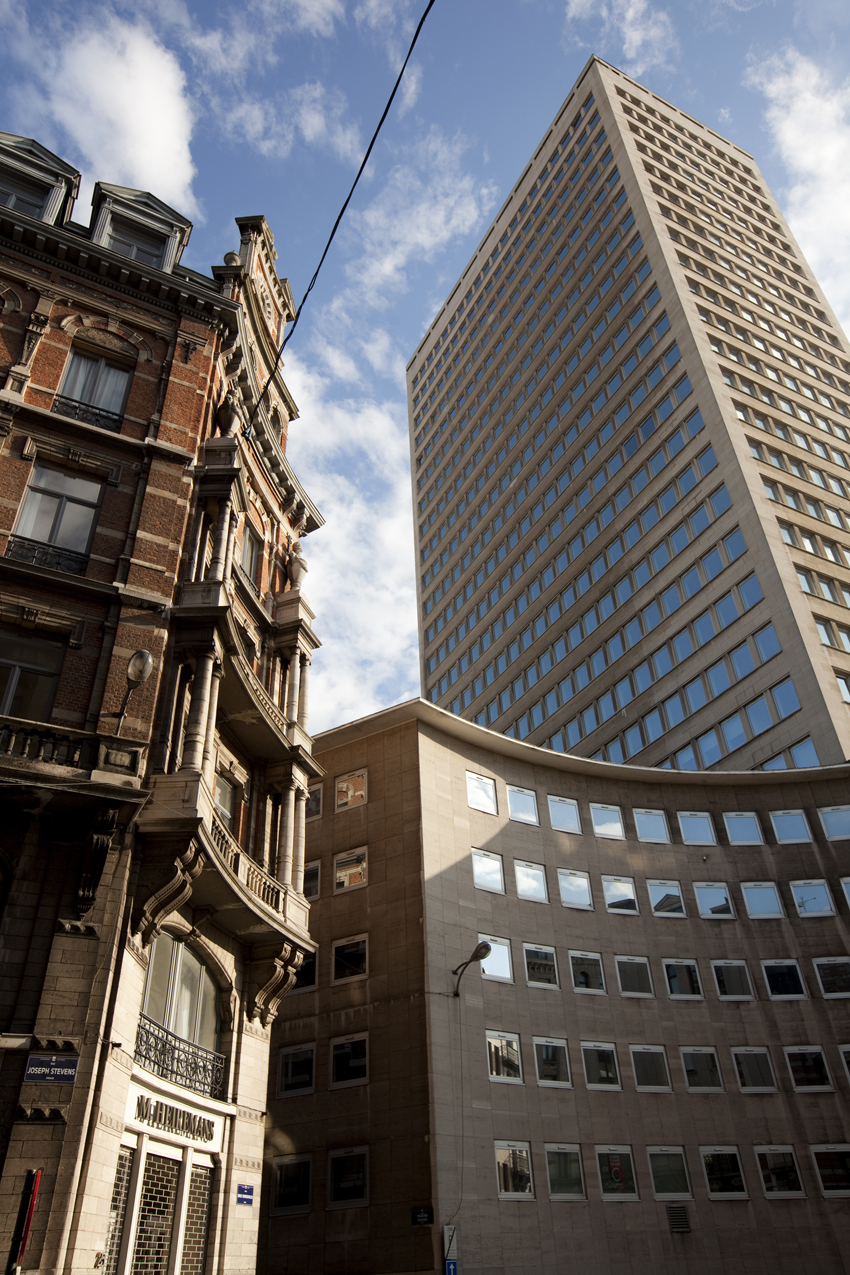
The Blaton Tower on the spot where the Maison du Peuple stood until its demolition in 1965

The Maison du Peuple was demolished in 1965, despite an international protest movement of over 700 architects, in what has been regarded as an "architectural crime". The building was dismantled entirely with the idea of rebuilding it elsewhere. However, its components were scattered in vacant lots around Brussels, and it was never reconstructed. Later, structural parts of the building were used in the Horta Grand Café in Antwerp and some of the original pieces can still be found in Horta premetro station in Saint-Gilles.

The loss of the Maison du Peuple was part of the trend of Brusselisation, where many historic buildings were torn down and replaced by skyscrapers. The Maison du Peuple itself was replaced by a 26-floor office building, the Blaton Tower, built in the year immediately after the Maison du Peuple's demolition by the Blaton family.

== Virtual reconstruction ==
Since 2014, a scientific team of the Université libre de Bruxelles (ULB) and the Horta Museum is virtually rebuilding parts of the Maison du Peuple: the entrance hall, the café, the staircase, the concert hall, the Matteoti Hall and the surroundings. The first results can be seen in the Horta Museum: a photorealistic eight-minute movie and a tablet app with navigable 360° renderings.

== See also ==
- Vooruit, a similar building in Ghent, built for the city's co-operative movement
- Art Nouveau in Brussels
- History of Brussels
- Culture of Belgium
- Belgium in the long nineteenth century
