= Brusselization =

Form of indiscriminate urban regeneration

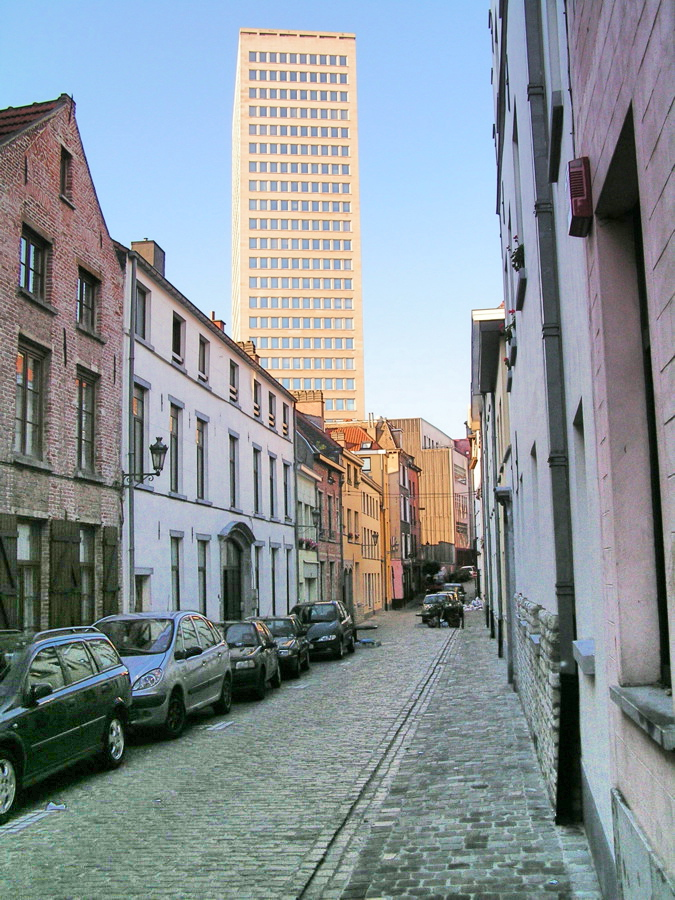
Blaton Tower, a modern high-rise in Brussels, built on the site of Victor Horta's Maison du Peuple/Volkshuis

In urban planning, Brusselization (US variant) or Brusselisation (UK variant) (French: bruxellisation; Dutch: verbrusseling) describes unregulated and often chaotic urban redevelopment with little regard for architectural and cultural heritage, resulting in a fragmented cityscape. It typically involves the destruction or replacement of existing properties, particularly in or near historical urban centers, with modern high-rise buildings.

The notion originates in its namesake city of Brussels, Belgium, which underwent uncontrolled development in the mid-20th century, particularly from the 1950s to the 1980s. This phenomenon was driven by a combination of factors, including unrestrained real estate speculation, a lack of zoning regulations, as well as the city authorities' laissez-faire approach to city planning. It was also linked to the city's post-war drive to accommodate vehicular traffic and international functions, such as those associated with the 1958 Brussels World's Fair (Expo 58) and the emerging institutions of the European Union.

== Definition and concept ==
Brusselization is "the indiscriminate and careless introduction of modern high-rise buildings into gentrified neighborhoods", and it has become a byword for "haphazard urban development and redevelopment." It requires the purchasing and demolition of existing structures in favor of newer buildings, often in the form of concrete or glass high-rises with more modern architecture relative to that of its neighborhood. New development may add to a historic city center's housing market—though this assumes the new development is housing; in reality, the majority of such development consists of offices or government structures. However, in the case of Brusselization, its rapid and haphazard architectural design processes often fail to account for changing the environment or vibe of an area, and as a result heavily gentrifies the surrounding area. Additionally, many of these developers may neglect the historical significance of buildings demolished for the newer structures.

== Brussels ==
=== Pre-1950s: historical precedents and genesis ===
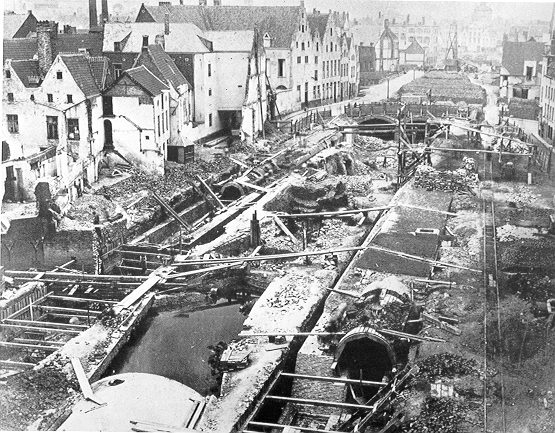
Covering of the Senne in Brussels, c. 1867–1871

The 1950s were not the first time that Brussels had been radically altered by major redevelopment. Two prior sweeping changes to the city's urban fabric were the straight-lined central boulevards modeled after Paris, which were created following the covering and diverting of the river Senne (1867–1871), as well as the North–South railway connection, which took around forty years to finish (1911–1952), and which had left swaths of the city center filled with debris and craters for decades. Another precedent was the construction of the Palace of Justice, the largest building erected in the 19th century (1866–1883), for which a section of the Marolles/Marollen neighborhood was demolished.

The writer André de Vries asserts that the penchant for heavy-handedness can be traced back to the reign of King Leopold II in the late 19th century, and possibly even all the way back to the bombardment of the city by Louis XIV's troops in 1695. "There is barely one building still standing", he says, "from before 1695, with the exception of some churches and the Town Hall". Leopold II sought to give Brussels the image of a grand capital city of an imperial/colonial power. By the middle 20th century, there was a tacit alliance between urban development entrepreneurs and local government, with a modernist agenda and with their sights set firmly on large-scale development projects. The citizens of Brussels were largely left out of the process.

=== From the 1950s to the 1980s: culmination and opposition ===
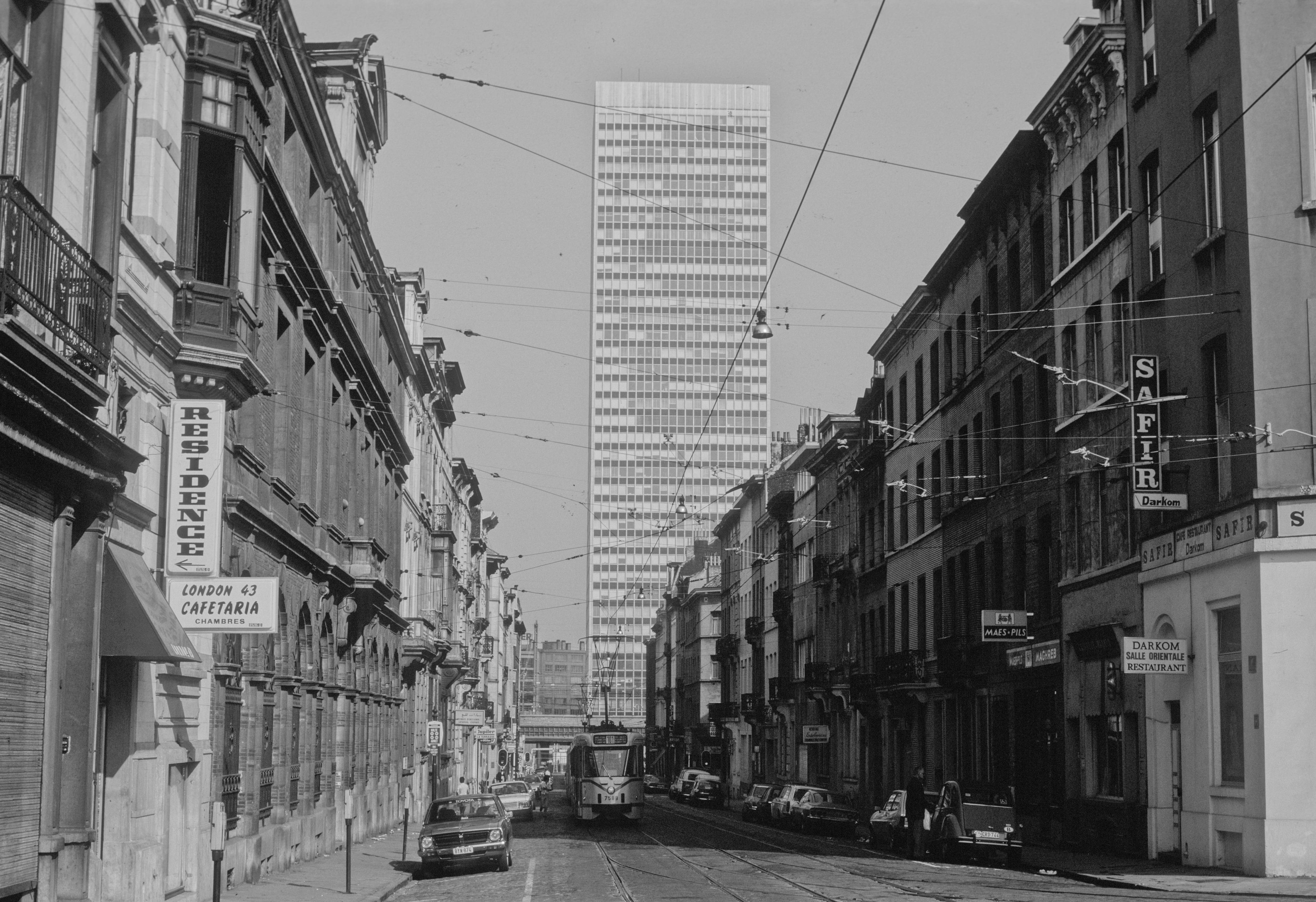
South Tower in Brussels, as seen from the Rue de Russie/Ruslandstraat, near Brussels-South railway station, in 1980

The original Brusselization was the type of urban regeneration performed by Brussels in connection with the 1958 Brussels World's Fair (Expo 58). In order to prepare the city for Expo 58, buildings were torn down without regard either to their architectural or historical importance, high-capacity square office or apartment buildings were built, boulevards were created and tunnels dug. Among the most controversial was the large-scale demolition of townhouses for development of the high-rise business district in the Northern Quarter. The car-centric approach also led to the construction of parking lots, as in the Rue de la Vierge Noire/Zwarte Lievevrouwstraat, where the Central Halls of 1874 were razed to make way for Parking 58. All of these changes were designed to quickly increase the number of people working and living in the city and improve transportation.

Further radical changes resulted from Brussels's role as the center of the European Union (EU) and NATO, beginning with the construction of the European Commission's headquarters in 1959. Entire blocks of residential buildings were acquired and left to decay until the last residents fled and building permits were finally granted out of sheer exhaustion. This method of neglect was then generalized to the entire city, where the amount of office space quintupled in about twenty years: from 615,000 m^{2} (6,620,000 sq ft) in 1949 to 3,300,000 m^{2} (36,000,000 sq ft) in the early 1970s. The introduction of a high-speed rail network in the 1990s was the latest excuse to speculate on multiple rows of properties for modern office or hotel redevelopment, which led to the razing of neighborhood blocks near Brussels-South railway station.

These changes caused outcry amongst the citizens of Brussels and by environmentalist and preservationist organizations. The demolition of Victor Horta's Maison du Peuple/Volkshuis in 1965 was one focus of such protests, as was the construction of the IBM Tower in 1978. Many architects also protested, and it was the architectural world that coined the name Brusselization for what was happening to Brussels. Architects such as Léon Krier and Maurice Culot formulated an anti-capitalist urban planning theory, as a rejection of the rampant modernism that they saw overtaking Brussels.

=== Since the 1990s: from Brusselization to façadism ===
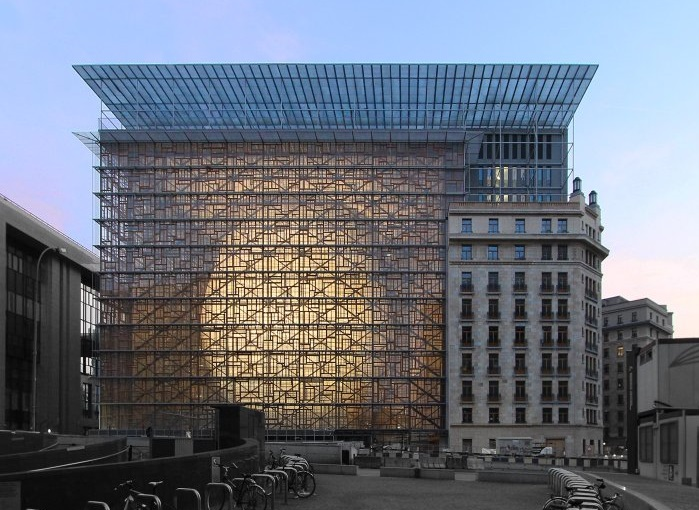
The Europa building, situated in the partially demolished and renovated Résidence Palace, is an example of contemporary Brusselization.

In the early 1990s, laws were introduced in Brussels restricting the demolition of buildings that were deemed to have architectural or historical significance, and in 1999, the city authorities' urban development plan explicitly declared high-rise buildings to be architecturally incompatible with the existing aesthetics of the city center. This led to the rise of what was termed façadisme, i.e. the destruction of the whole interior of a historic building while preserving its historic façade, with new buildings erected behind or around it.

These laws were the Town Planning Act 1991, which gave local authorities the powers to refuse demolition requests on the grounds of historical, aesthetic, or cultural significance, and to designate architectural heritage zones; and the Heritage Conservation Act of 1993, which gave the government of the Brussels-Capital Region the power to designate buildings to be protected for historic reasons. However, this system had its deficiencies. Whilst the Capital Region's government could designate historic buildings, it was the nineteen municipal authorities within it that were responsible for demolition permits. Not until the introduction of a permis unique system was this internecine conflict resolved.

== Global perspectives ==
While primarily localized in Brussels, the concept of Brusselization developed and occurred in other neighboring regions as well, notably Paris in the 1960s, where much of Brussels' early redevelopments took inspiration, and London with the Canary Wharf developments around the same time.

== See also ==
- Californication
- Manhattanization
- Vancouverism
- Historic preservation
- Disease of Turku
- Redevelopment of Norrmalm
- Venice Charter
- Maelbeek Valley Garden
