= Blaton family =

The Blaton Family is a Belgian family active in the construction industry since 1865.

== History ==
In 1865, Adolphe Blaton-Aubert (1835–1905) founded the company ‘Entreprises Blaton Aubert’. At that time the company sold building materials. Quickly they focused on concrete and by the end of the 19th century, it was a flourishing firm specializing in the application of concrete. Around this time Adolphe’s sun, Armand Joseph Blaton-Peyralbe (1863–1929), took over the business. He transformed the firm into a professional contractor company, with mostly public and industrial building sites in the order book.

In 1927, Armand’s two sons, Armand Eugène (1897–1988) and Emile (1901–1970), became head of the company. They focused on innovation. An example of this is their collaboration with the Belgian engineer and professor, Gustave Magnel. Together they created the system Blaton-Magnel for prestressed concrete. It is these kinds of innovation that brought them all over the world after World War II.

They built the Walnut Lane Memorial Bridge in 1949 in Philadelphia, the first prestressed concrete bridge in the United States of America. That same year, they started a company in Belgian Congo: Company Congolaise de Constructions.

In 1954, the family business was dramatically restructured. Emile Blaton founded the contractor company CIT-Blaton with his children, Thérèse, Paul and Pierre. Meanwhile, Armand Eugène Blaton founded Batiments et Ponts (Batiponts) with his two sons Ado and Jean Blaton. This company was active in Belgium, but also took over the companies the Blatons had been running in Congo.With his other two sons, Armand and Gérald Blaton, he founded S.A. Travaux.

== Present-day businesses ==
Up to today, the Group Blaton covers many branches in the Belgian construction industry. The book Main Basse sur Bruxelles by the investigation journalist Georges Timmerman, illustrates how the family is also active in the real estate sector.
