= Walnut Lane Memorial Bridge =

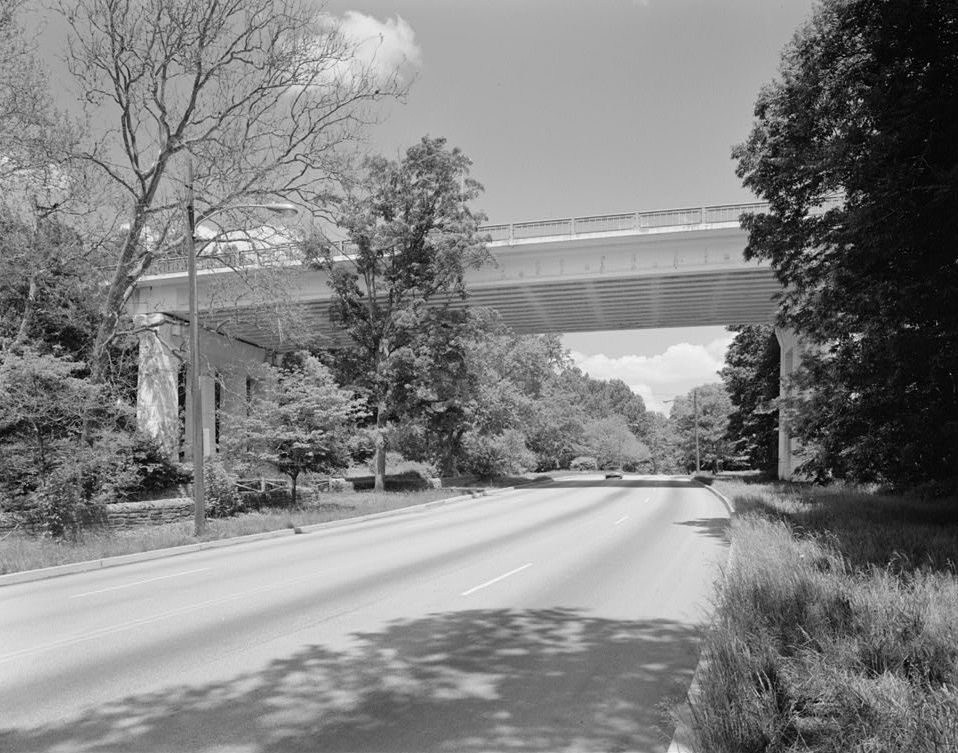
- Coordinates: 40°01′59″N 75°11′16″W
- Carries: Walnut Lane
- Crosses: Lincoln Drive and Monoshone Creek
- Locale: Philadelphia, Pennsylvania

Characteristics
- Design: Girder
- Material: Concrete

History
- Construction cost: $700,000
- Opened: 1951

Philadelphia Register of Historic Places

Location
- Interactive map of Walnut Lane Memorial Bridge

The original Walnut Lane Memorial Bridge was a prestressed concrete girder bridge in Philadelphia, Pennsylvania, designed by Belgian Engineer Gustave Magnel and built by the City of Philadelphia. Completed and fully opened to traffic in 1951, this three-span bridge carried Walnut Lane over Lincoln Drive and Monoshone Creek. It was the first major prestressed concrete beam bridge designed and built in the United States when completed.

The form of the bridge was simple, and it looked similar to many highway bridges carrying traffic on US highways today. The bridge deck was supported by thirteen concrete girders, each spanning 160 feet (49 m). These girders were prestressed by post-tensioning four wire cables embedded in the concrete. Although this type of construction had been used in Europe for quite some time, the Walnut Lane Memorial Bridge was innovative in the United States and led to the successful application of this technology in this country. The material-saving bridge cost about $700,000 to construct, about 30 percent cheaper than a regular concrete arch design.

The fascia (external) beams of the main span exhibited longitudinal cracks in about 1957. The other girders exhibited no cracks. Through the years, the cracks in the fascia beams were repaired and monitored. However, in 1989, the Pennsylvania Department of Transportation made the decision to replace the bridge superstructure. Because of the historical significance of the structure, the decision was controversial. However, the replacement structure (the new Walnut Lane Memorial Bridge) comprises prestressed concrete girders and is similar in appearance to the original. The new bridge was completed in 1990.

A bronze plaque on the bridge's abutment reads:

WALNUT LANE MEMORIAL BRIDGE

Dedicated November 11, 1950
Opened to Traffic February 1, 1951
The First Prestressed Concrete
Girder Bridge Built in the United States

This structure is symbolic of the integrity and ability of the
engineers and builders who during sixty six years – 1885-1951 –
of Public Works Administrations, constructed many worthy
projects for the City of Philadelphia. It is an outstanding
example of the vision and courage these men showed in their
planning and building.

Bernard Samuel
Mayor of Philadelphia

A second plaque reads: "Outstanding Civil Engineering Achievement / Designated May 1978"

== See also ==
- List of bridges documented by the Historic American Engineering Record in Pennsylvania
