= Patricia Radelet-de Grave =

Belgian historian of physics (born 1948)

Patricia Anne Marie Marguerite Radelet-de Grave (born 1948) is a Belgian historian of physics, and an extraordinary professor, emerita, at UCLouvain. She is the editor of the Bernoulli Edition, a project to publish the complete works of the Bernoulli family.

== Education and career ==
After completing a European Baccalaureate at the European School, Brussels I, in 1967, Radelet-de Grave studied theoretical physics at UCLouvain, where she received a licenciate in 1971. Continuing there in the history of physics, she received a second licenciate in 1972, and completed her Ph.D. (with the highest distinction) in 1981. Her dissertation, Les lignes magnétiques depuis le Moyen-Age jusqu'au milieu du 18e siècle, collection de textes et étude du développement de ce concept, was directed by David Speiser.

After offering courses in the history of science at UCLouvain on a temporary basis from 1987 to 1991, she joined the university staff as a chargé de cours in 1991, for the same course. During this time she also visited the University of Nantes and the EHESS in Paris, and co-founded a center for the history of science at UCLouvain. She was named as a part-time professor at UCLouvain in 1999, and as general editor of the Bernoulli Edition in 2001. After additional visiting positions, including four years as a chargé de conférences at the EHESS, she was named as an extraordinary professor at UCLouvain in 2006.

== Books ==
Beyond her work with the Bernoulli Edition, Radelet-de Grave's books include:

- Entre Méchanique et Architecture / Between Mechanics and Architecture (Birkhäuser, 1995, edited with Eduardo Benvenuto)
- Opera omnia Euleri. Series tertia, Opera physica, Miscellanea, vol. 10. Commentationes physicae ad theoriam caloris, electricitatis et magnetismi pertinentes (Birkhäuser, 2004, with David Speiser)
- Liber Amicorum Jean Dhombres (Brepols, 2008)
- Une mécanique donnée à voir: Les théses illustrées défendues à Louvain en julliet 1624 par Grégoire de Saint-Vincent S.J by Jean Dhombres (Brepols, 2008)
- Homage to Evangelista Torricelli’s Opera geometrica 1644–2024. Text, transcription, commentaries and selected essays as new historical insights (Springer, 2024, with Raffaele Pisano and Paolo Bussotti)

== Recognition ==
Radelet-de Grave was elected as a full member of the International Academy of the History of Science in 2005.
