= Zollman =

Zollman or Zollmann is a German surname. Notable people with the surname include:

- Johann Wilhelm Zollmann (1697–1749), German cartographer and geodesist
- Friedrich Zollmann (1690–1762), German archivist, historian and cartographer
- Péter Zollman (1931–2013), Hungarian-born scientist, research physicist, engineer, inventor, and translator
- Philipp Heinrich Zollmann (1690–1748), German cartographer and scientist
- Ronald Zollman (born 1950), Belgian conductor
